= Bouzareah Mountain =

Mountain in Algiers, Algeria

Bouzaréah Mountain
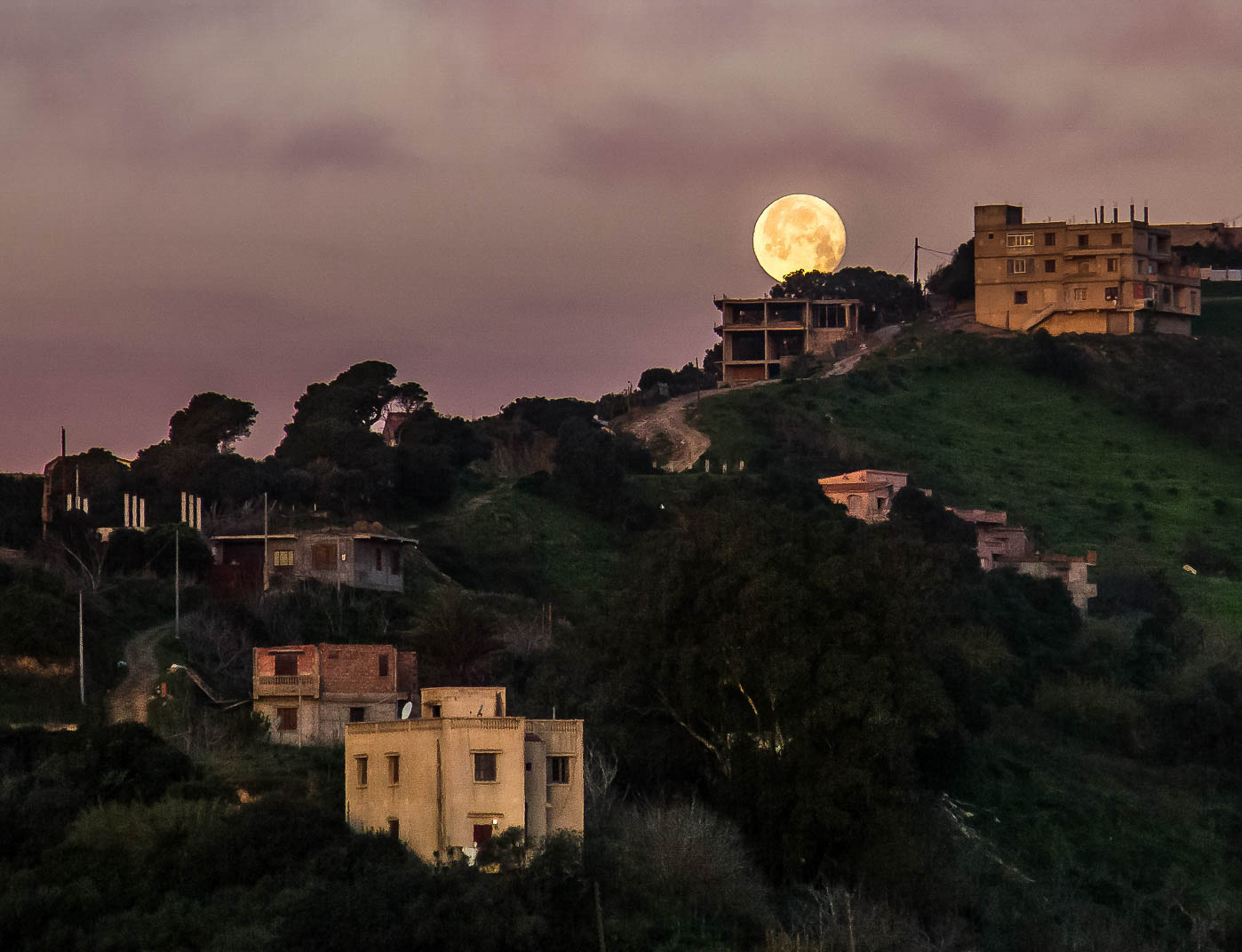

Highest point
- Elevation: 410 m (1,350 ft)
- Coordinates: 36.7871714°N 3.0172493°E

Geography
- Bouzaréah - Bouzaréah District - Algiers Province Algeria
- Parent range: Tell Atlas

Geology
- Rock age: Quaternary

Bouzareah Mountain is a peak in the Algerian Coast Mountain Range in the Tell Atlas of Algeria, located in Bouzareah, Bouzareah District, in Algiers Province.

== Description ==
Bouzareah Mountain is the highest peak in Algiers Province within the Algerian Coast Mountains, with an elevation of 410 m (1,345 ft), overlooking the western Gulf of Algiers and the Mitidja Plain, and facing the Khachna Mountains to the east and the Titteri Mountains to the south.

This is offset by the Bouzegza Mountain in the eastern Gulf of Algeria, where the Keddara Dam was constructed on the course of the Bouzegza and Boudouaou valleys.

The top of this mountain can be reached via six national roads: National Road 1 (Algiers), National Road 5, National Road 11, National Road 36, National Road 41, and National Road 63.

Water streams originate from the foothills of the mountain, including Sidi Majbar Valley and Beni Messous Valley.

== Location ==
Bouzareah Mountain is located in Algiers Province on the coastal strip stretching from the estuary of Oued El Harrach Valley to Mazafran Valley.

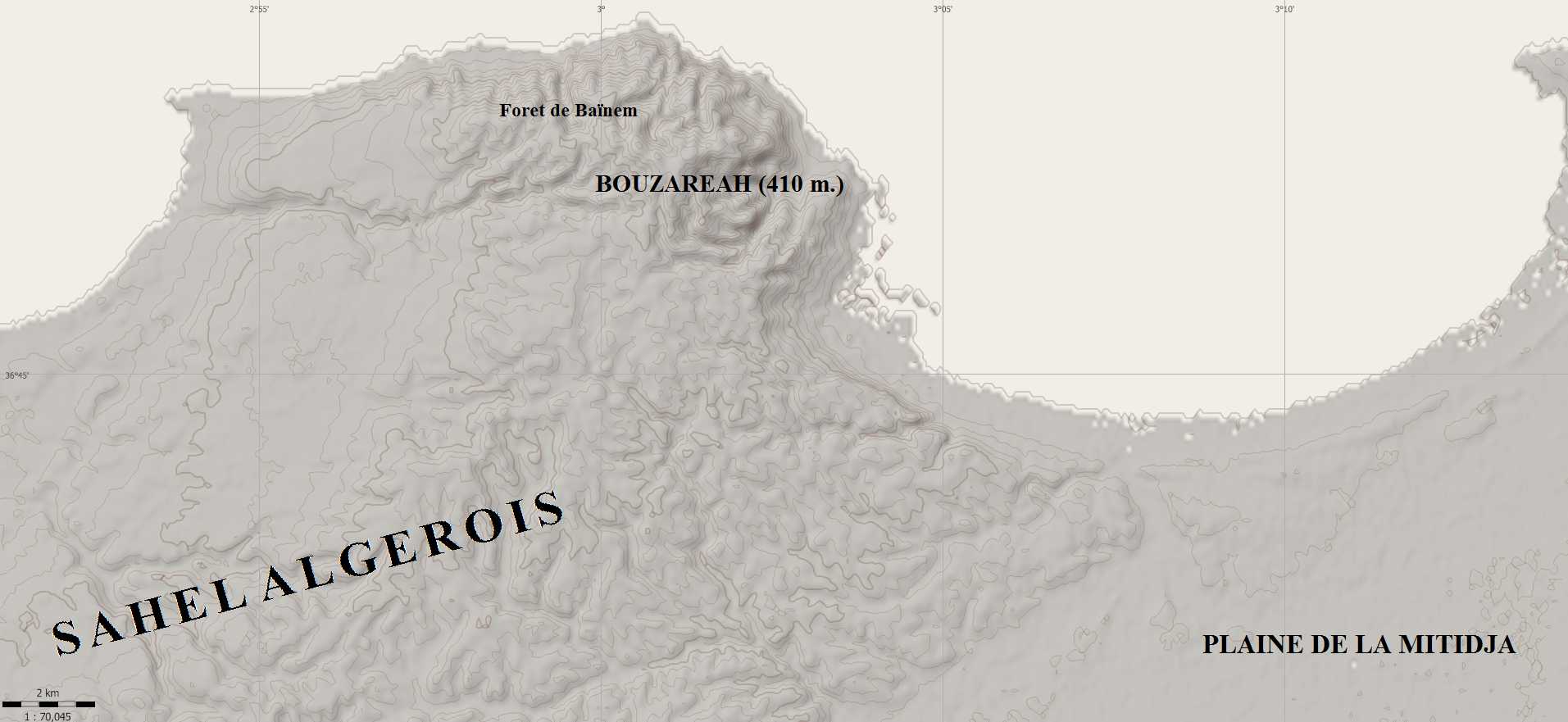
Algeria's coastal mountains

== Geology ==
The formation of Bouzareah Mountain dates back to the Quaternary period of the Cenozoic on the geologic timescale.

The surrounding terrain is characterized by gray marble that is connected by paths of reddish siderite and iron ore.

The composition of this terrain is characterized by the presence of crystalline schist and mica-schist.

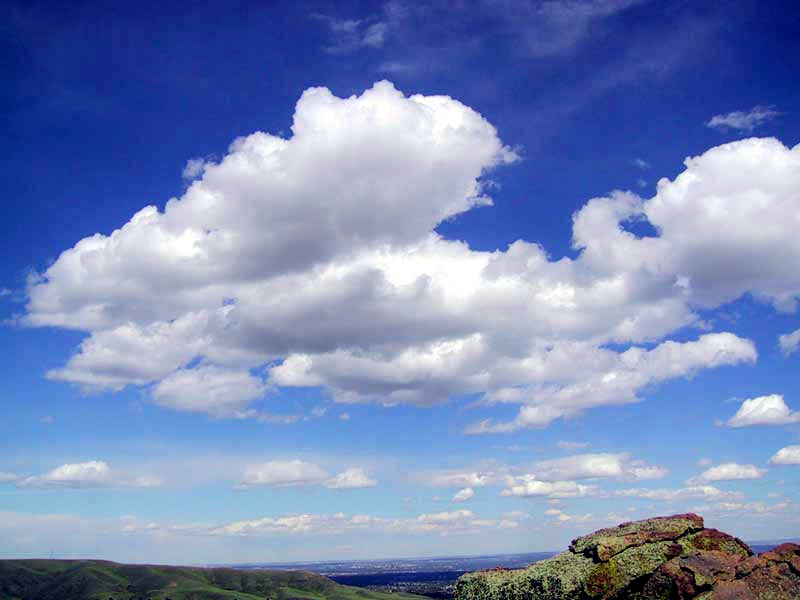
Climate of Algeria

== Climate ==
The predominant climate in Bouzareah Mountain is Mediterranean climate, cold and wet in winter and hot and dry in summer. The annual rainfall ranges from 500 to 1,300 mm from October to March, and the coastal areas are known for their pleasant weather, with an average annual temperature of 18° on the coastline and 25° in the interior of Algiers.

== Valleys ==
A lot of valleys originate and surround Bouzareah Mountain, including:

- Sidi Majbar Valley.
- Beni Masous Valley.

== Lakes ==
- Dali Ibrahim Lake

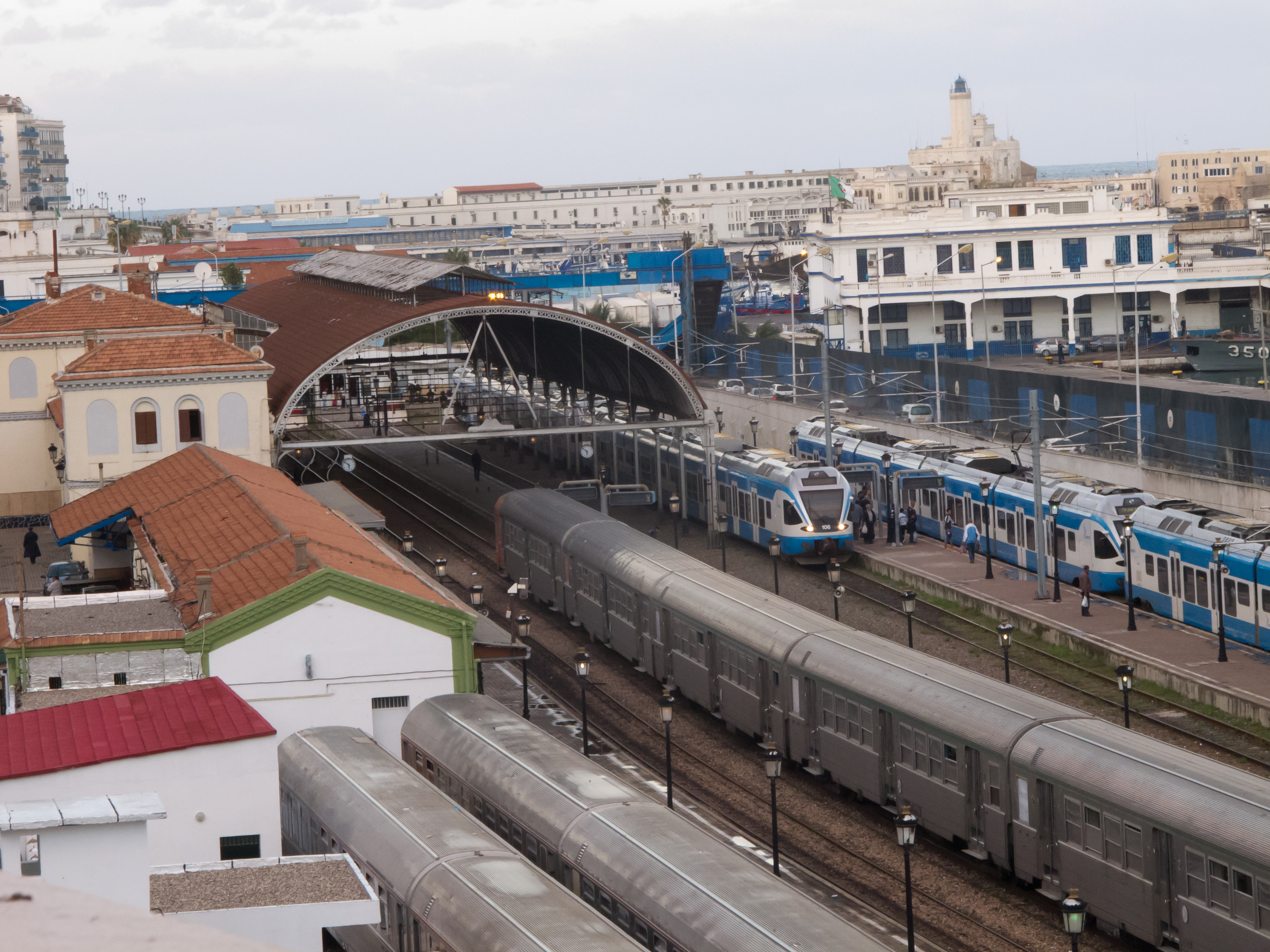
Algiers railway station

== Transportation ==
Bouzareah Mountain can be reached by means of transportation, including:

- Bouzareah Teleferic.
- Algiers railway station.
- Ain El Bunyan railway station.

== Ecological diversity ==
=== Trees ===
Many species of trees surround Bouzareah mountain and its forests.

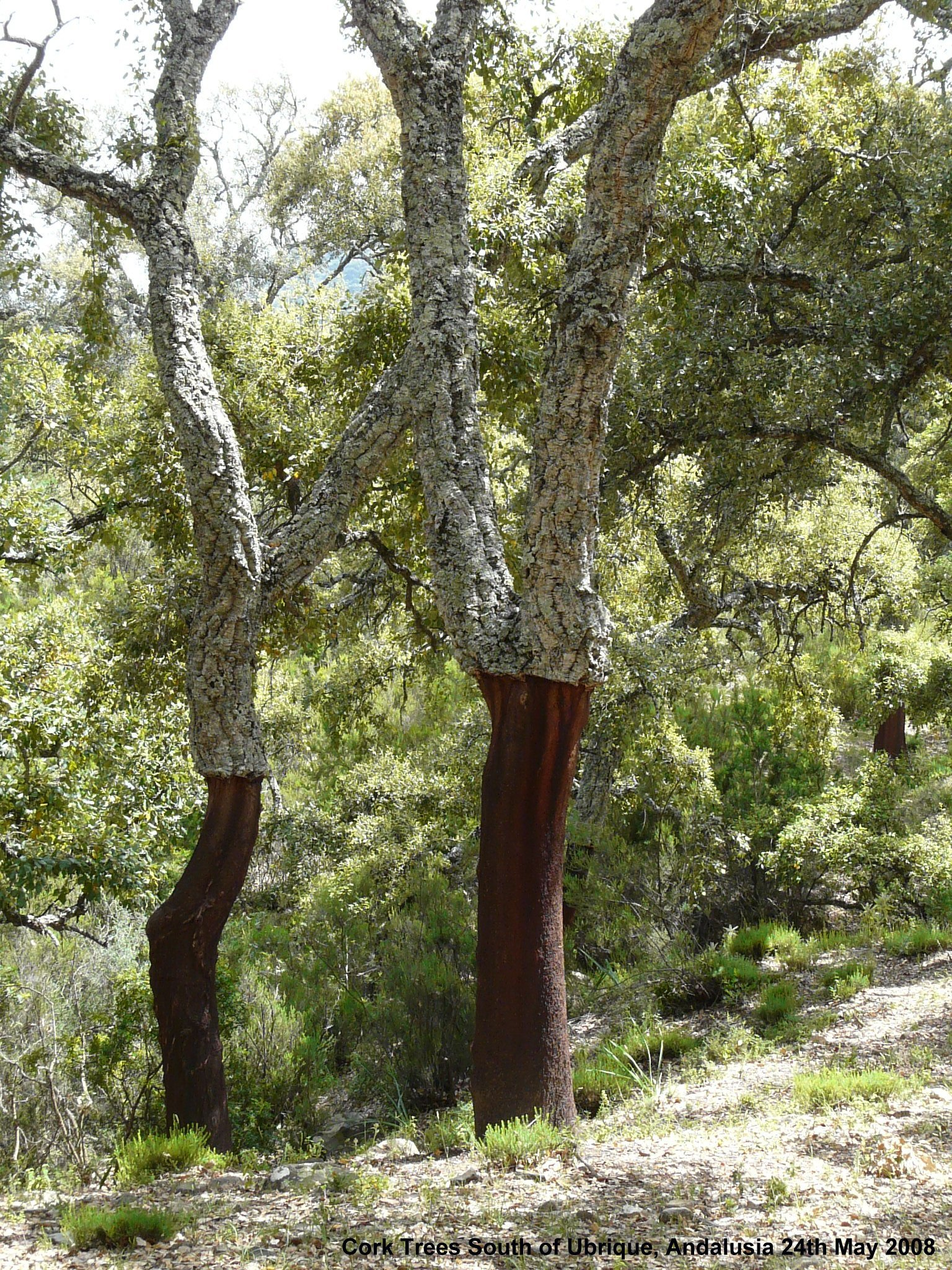
Quercus suber

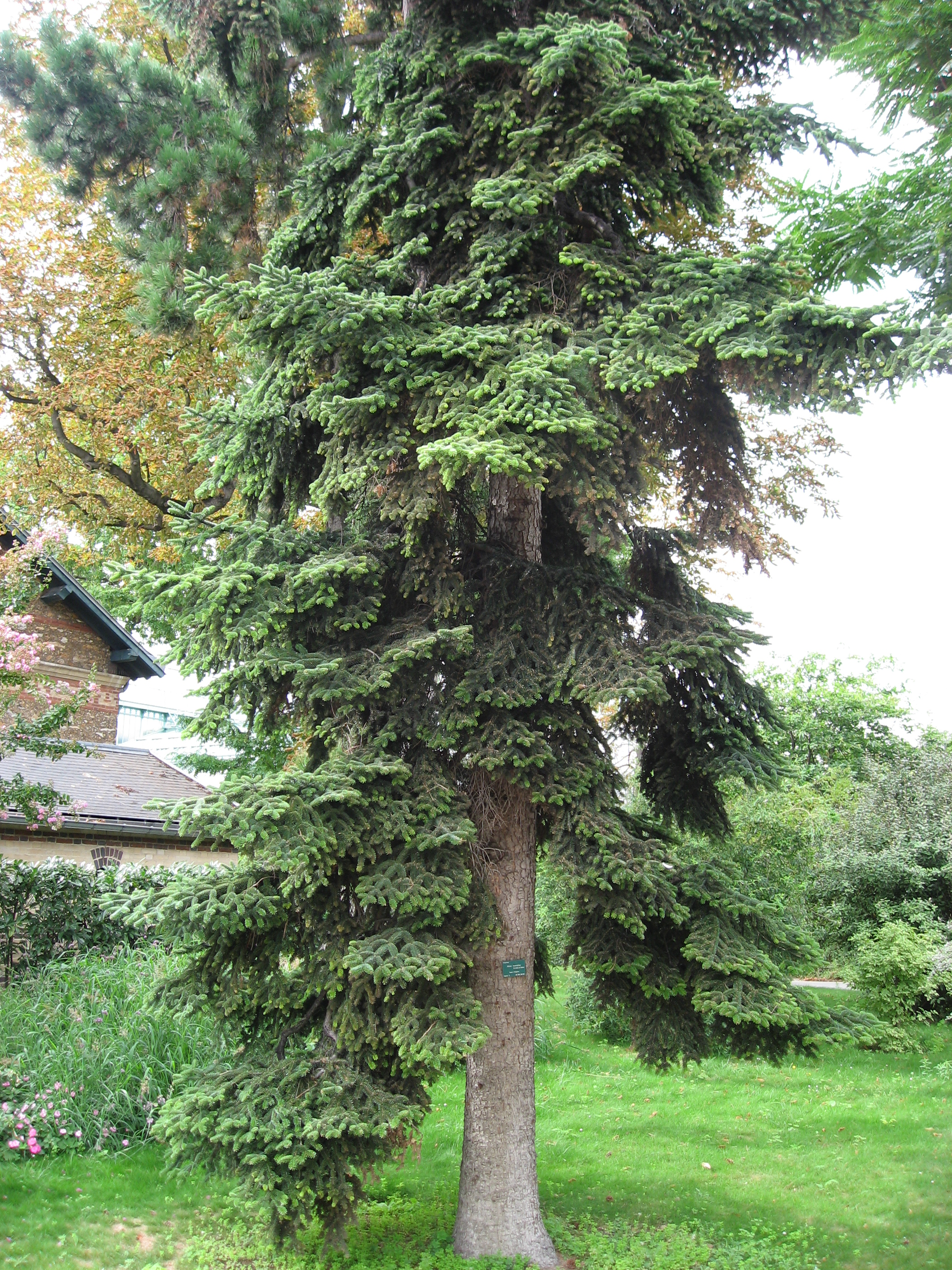
Abies numidica

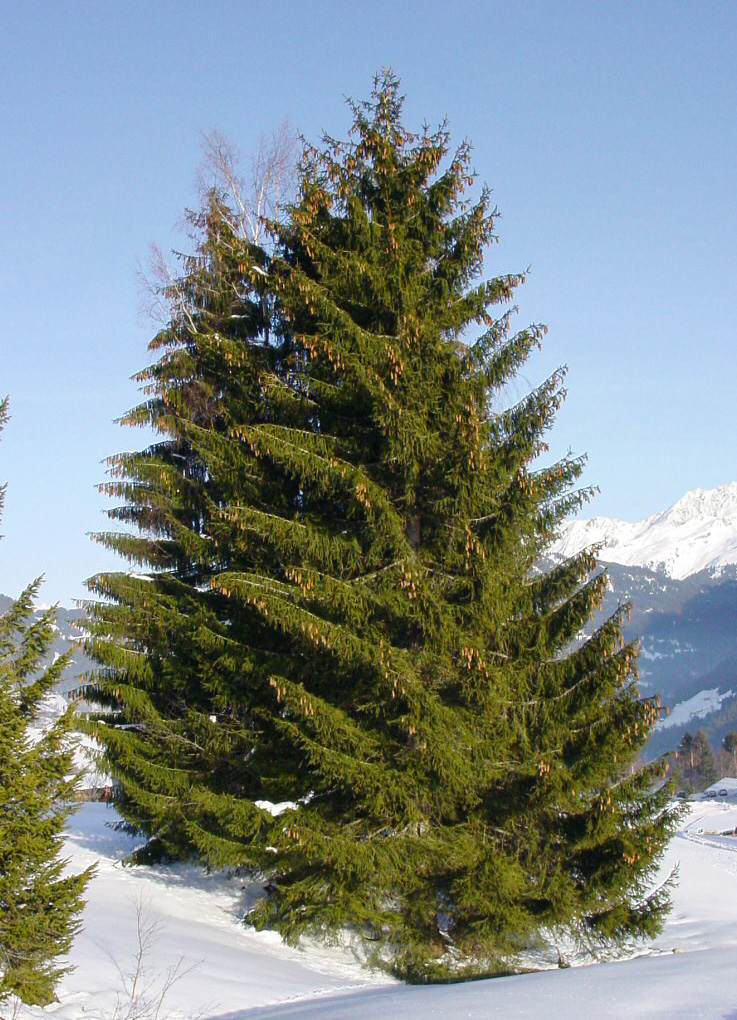
Picea abies

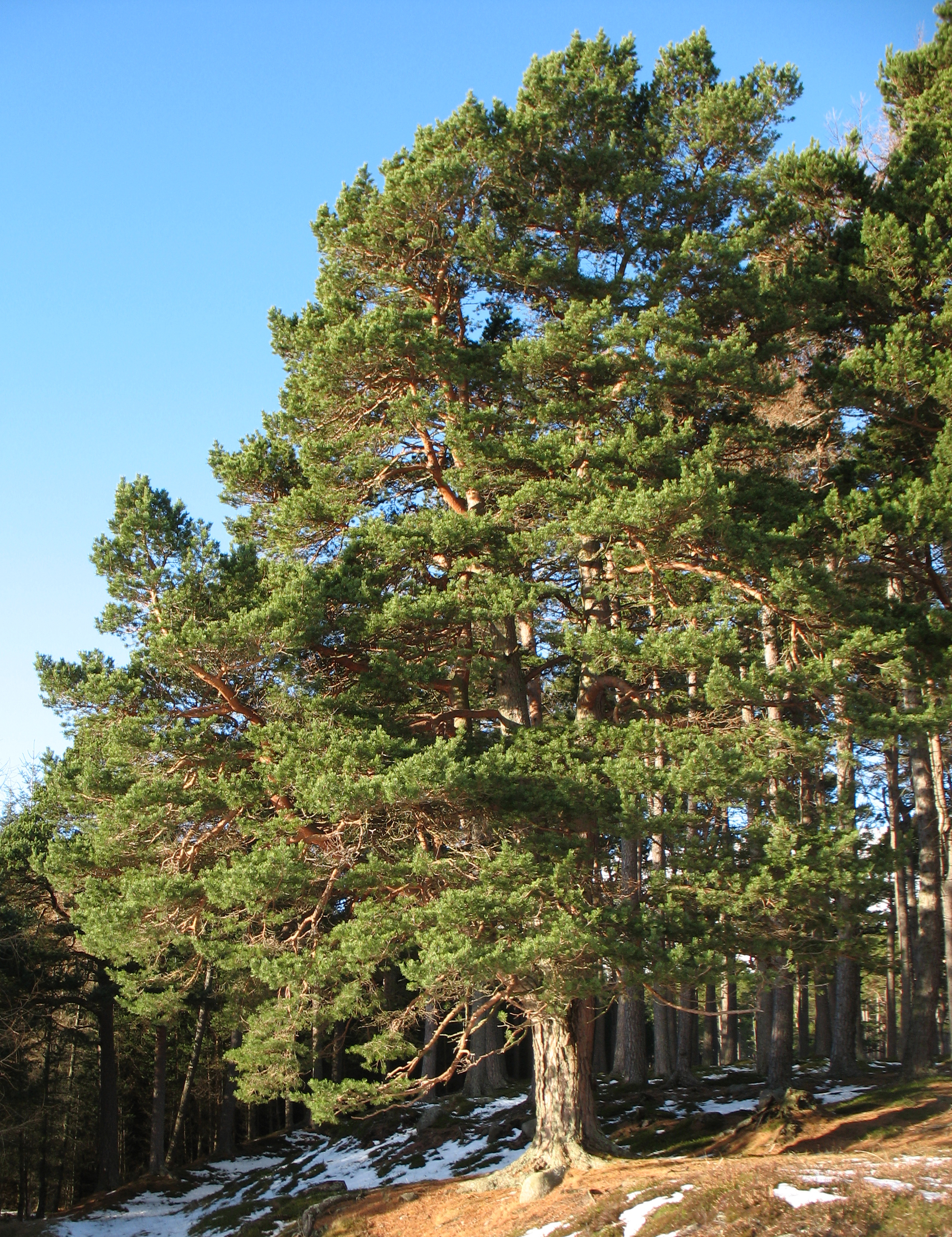
Pinus sylvestris

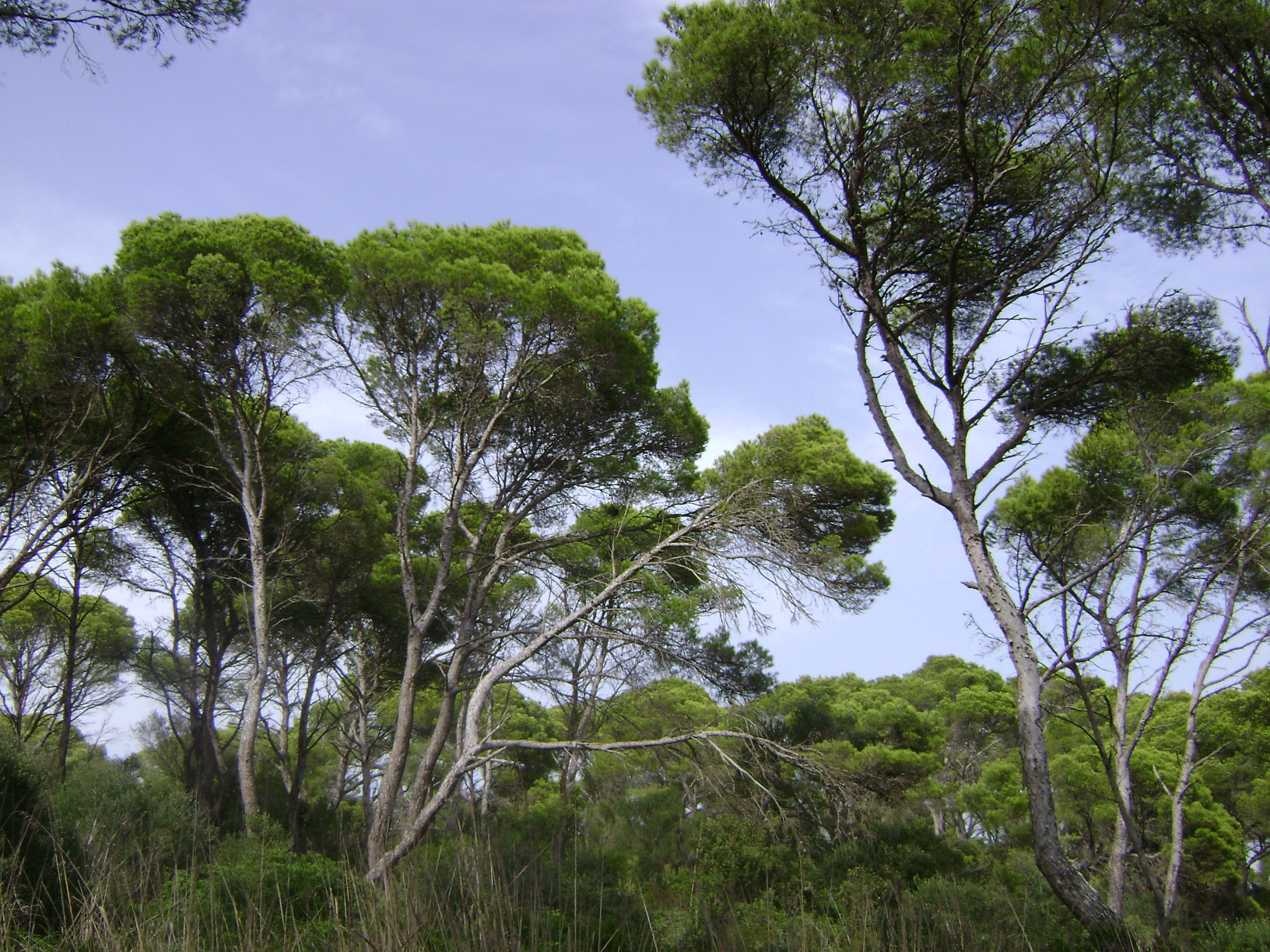
Pinus halepensis

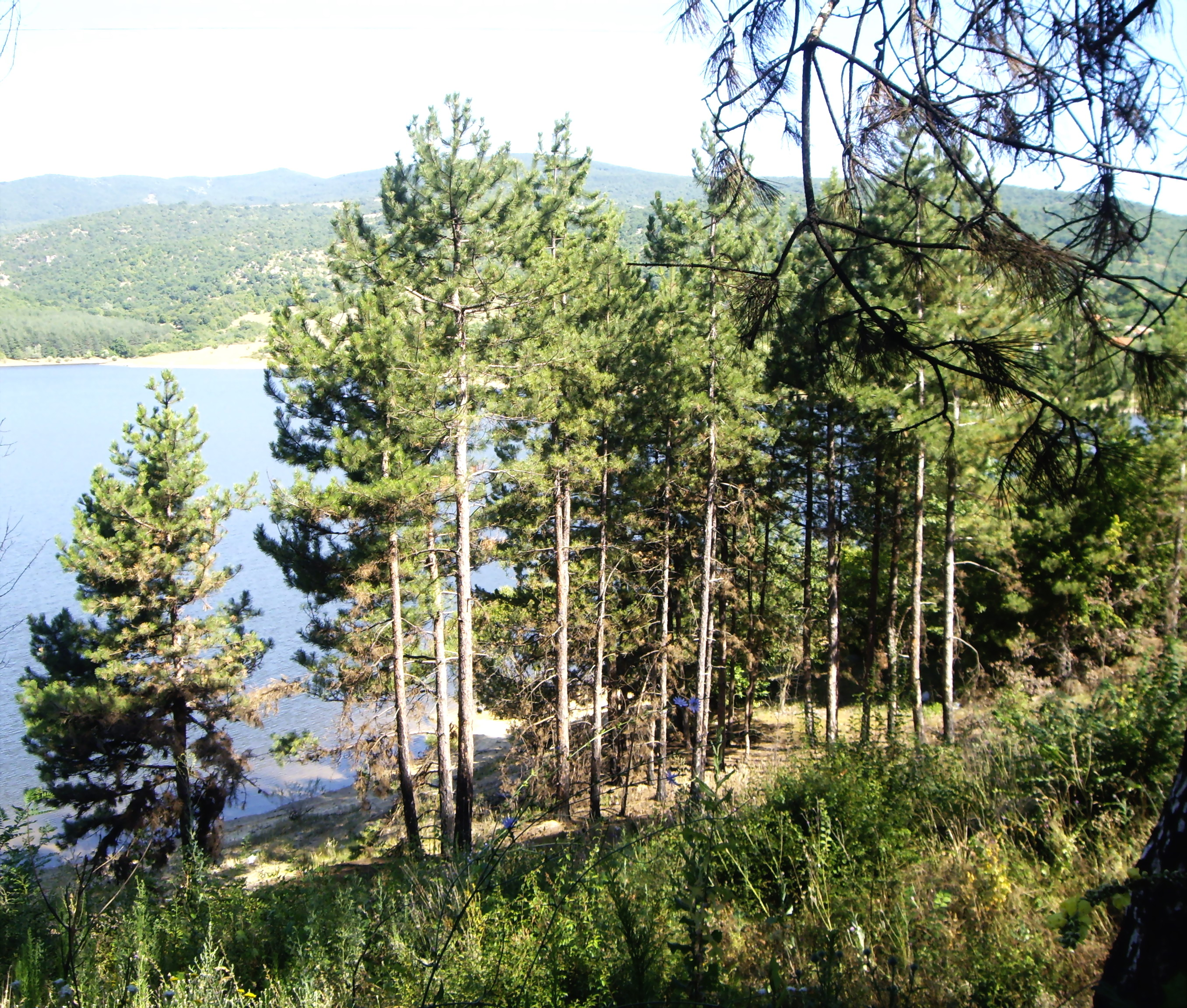
Pinus nigra

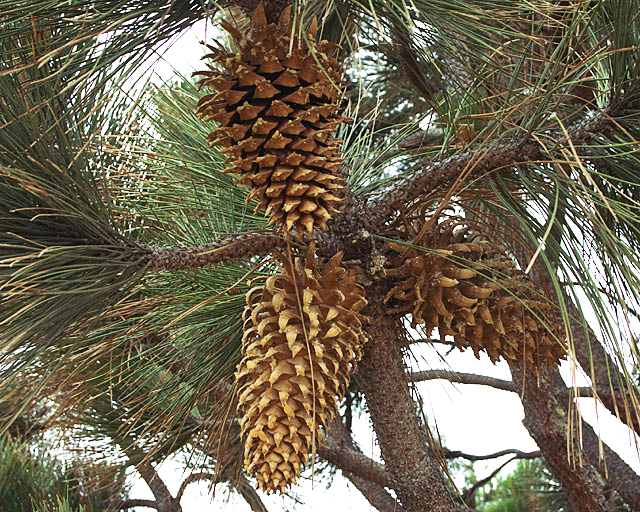
Coulter pine

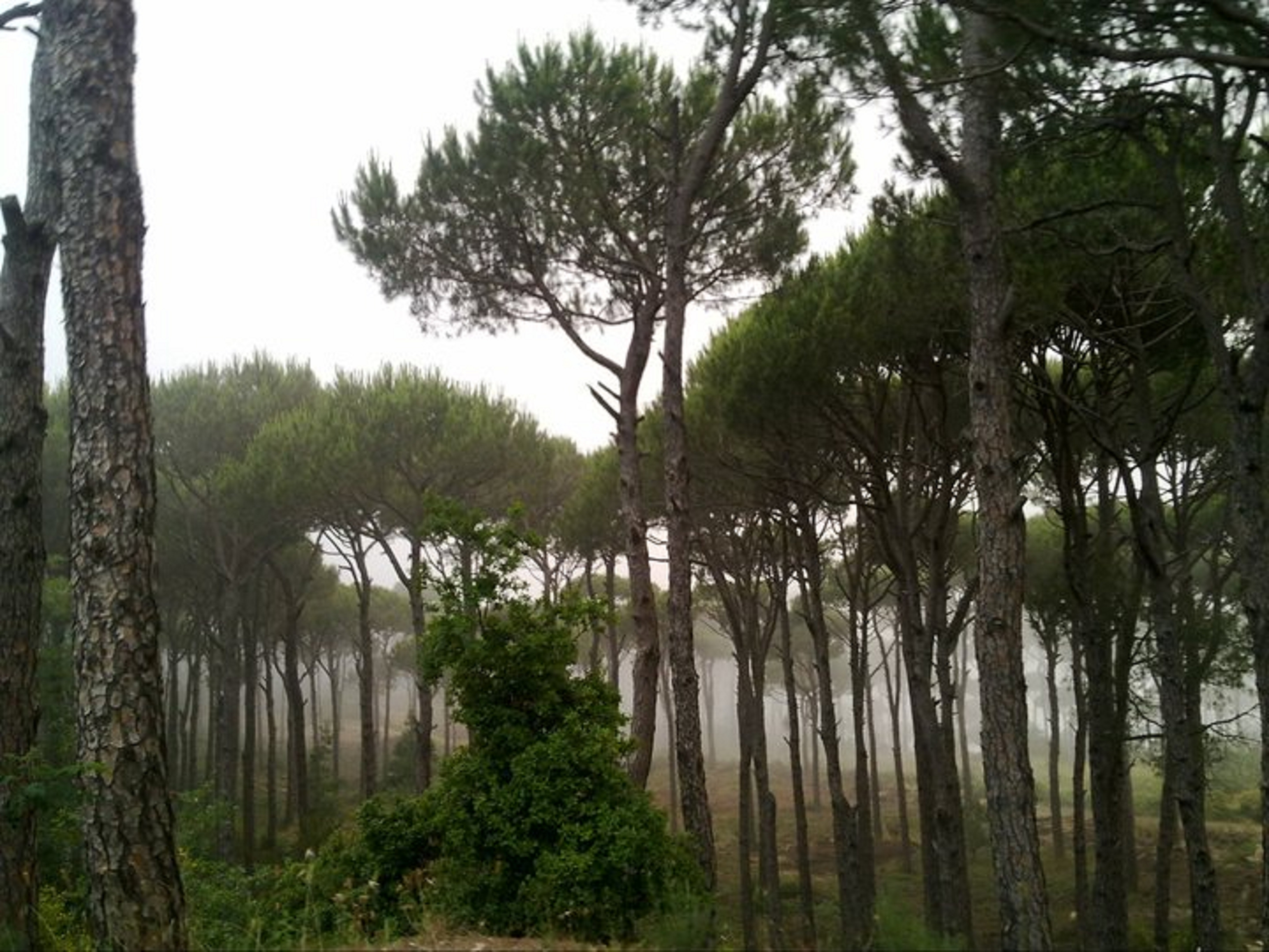
Stone pine

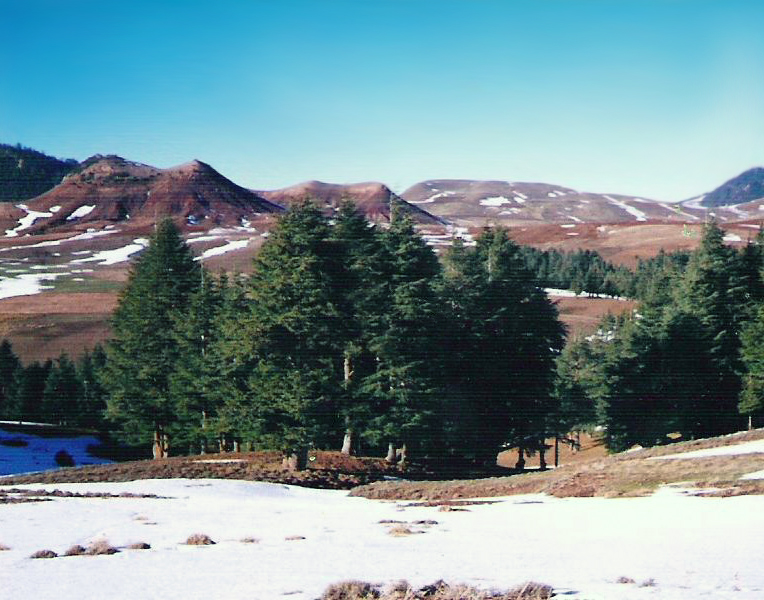
Cedrus atlantica

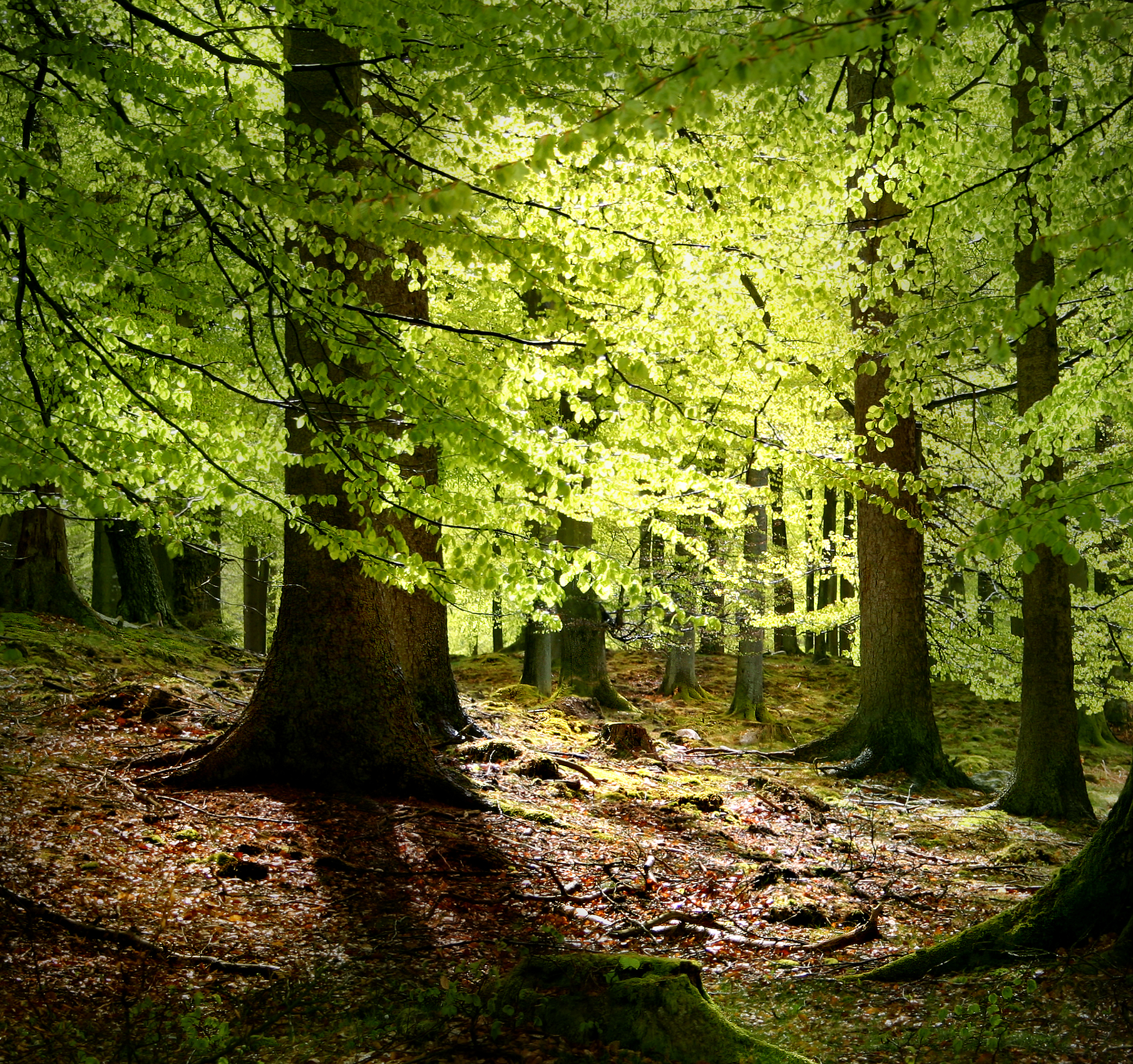
Fagus sylvatica

=== Animals ===
Many species of mammals live in the Algerian Coast Mountains within the forests of the Bouzareah forest and as well other forests.

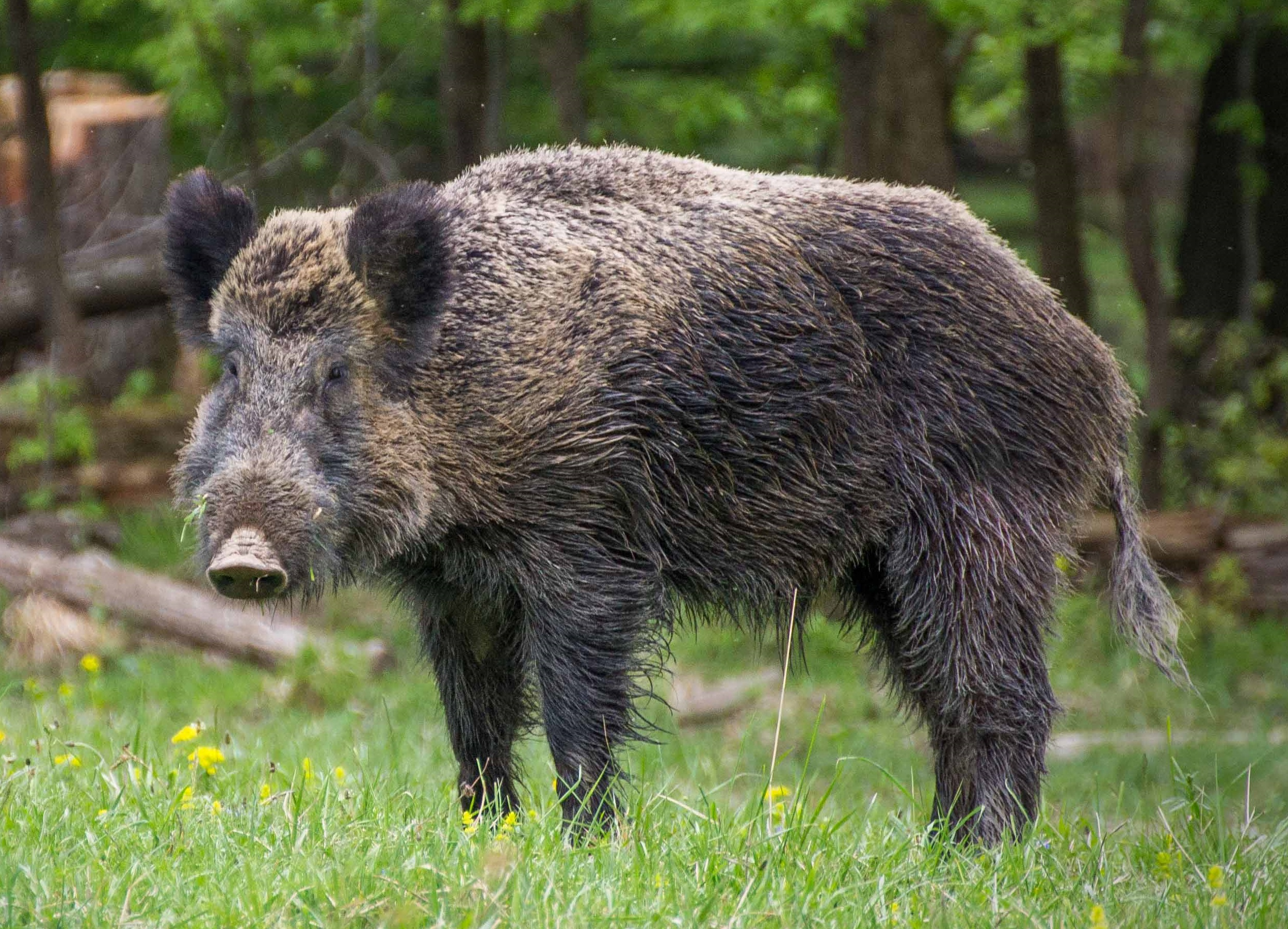
Wild boar

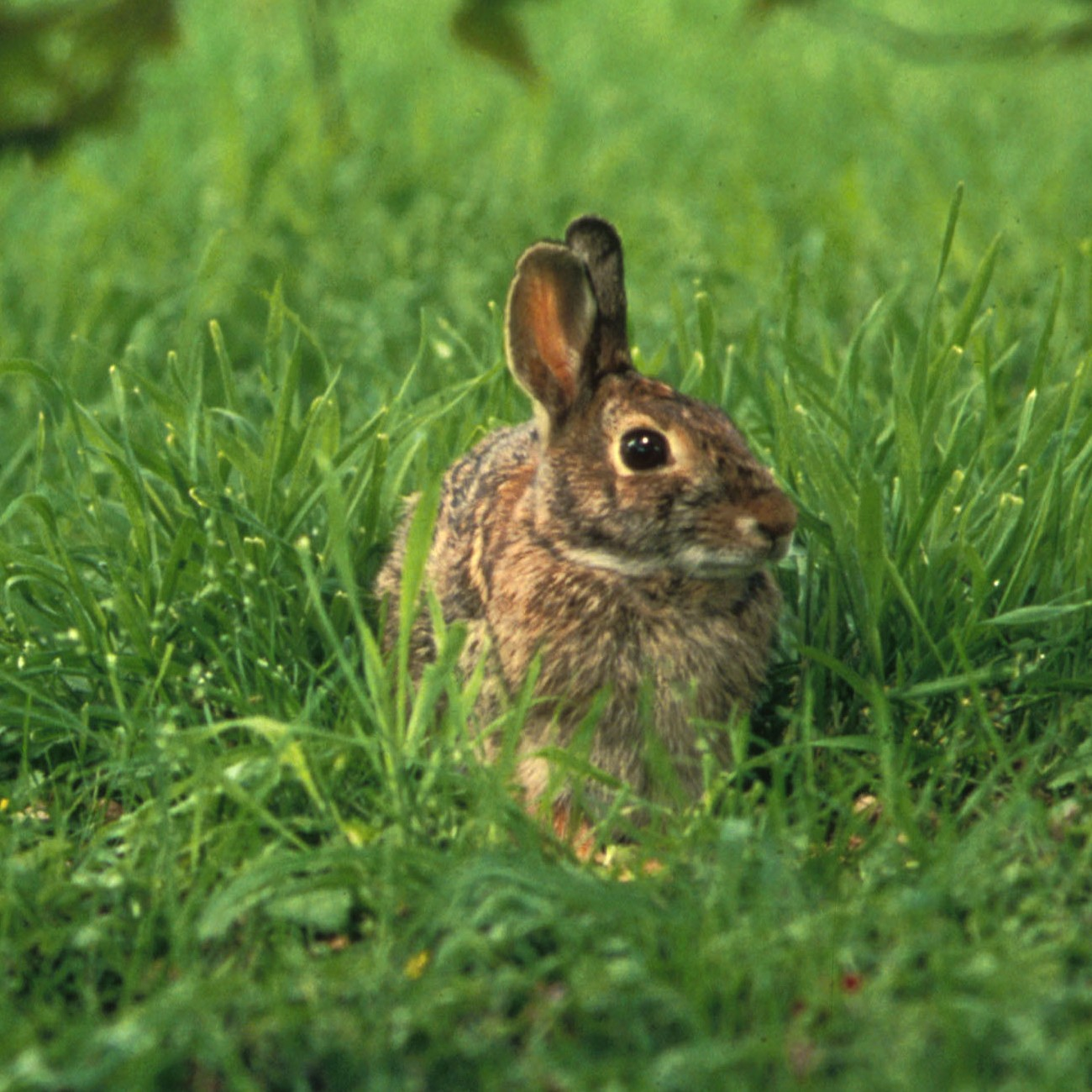
Rabbit

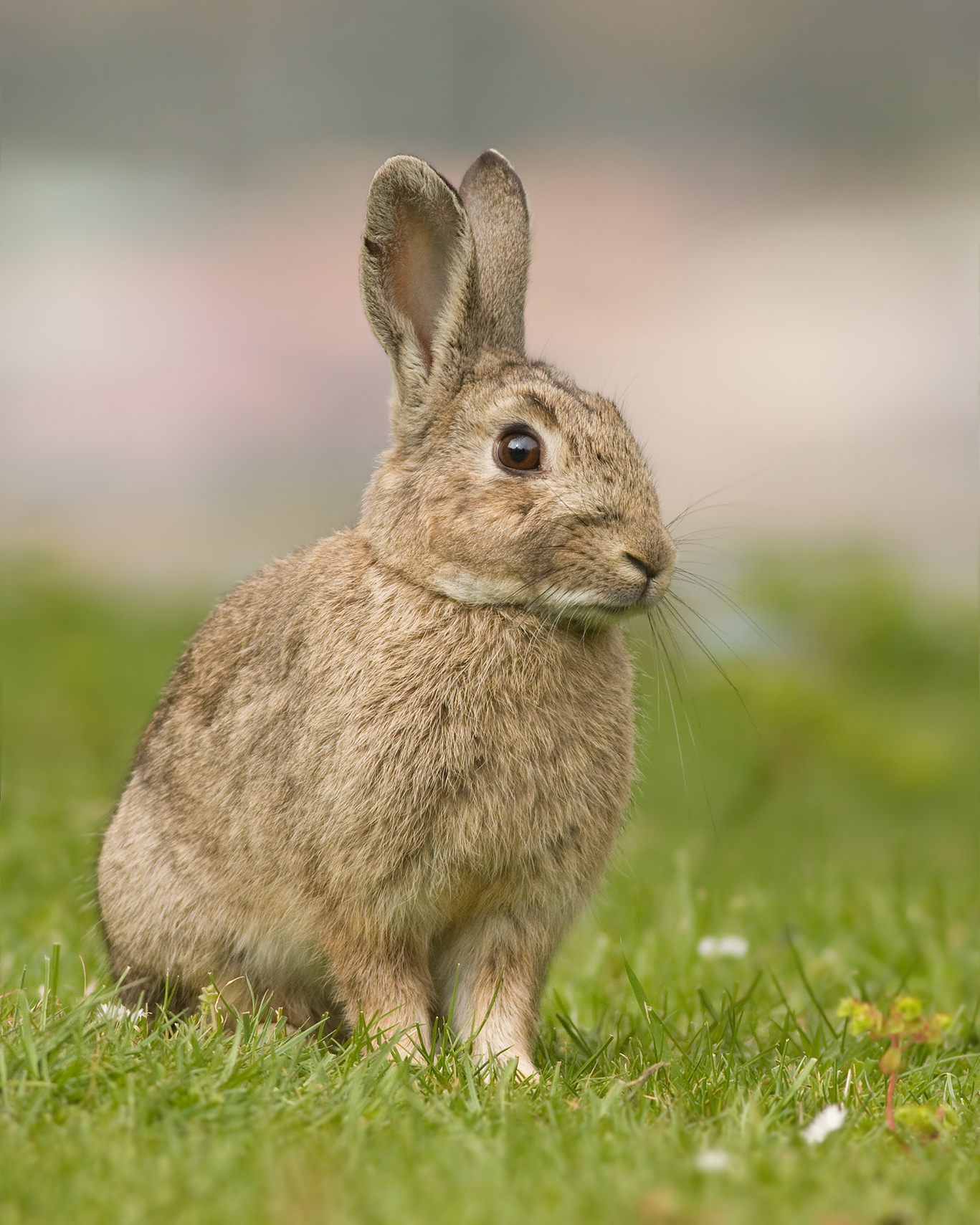
European rabbit

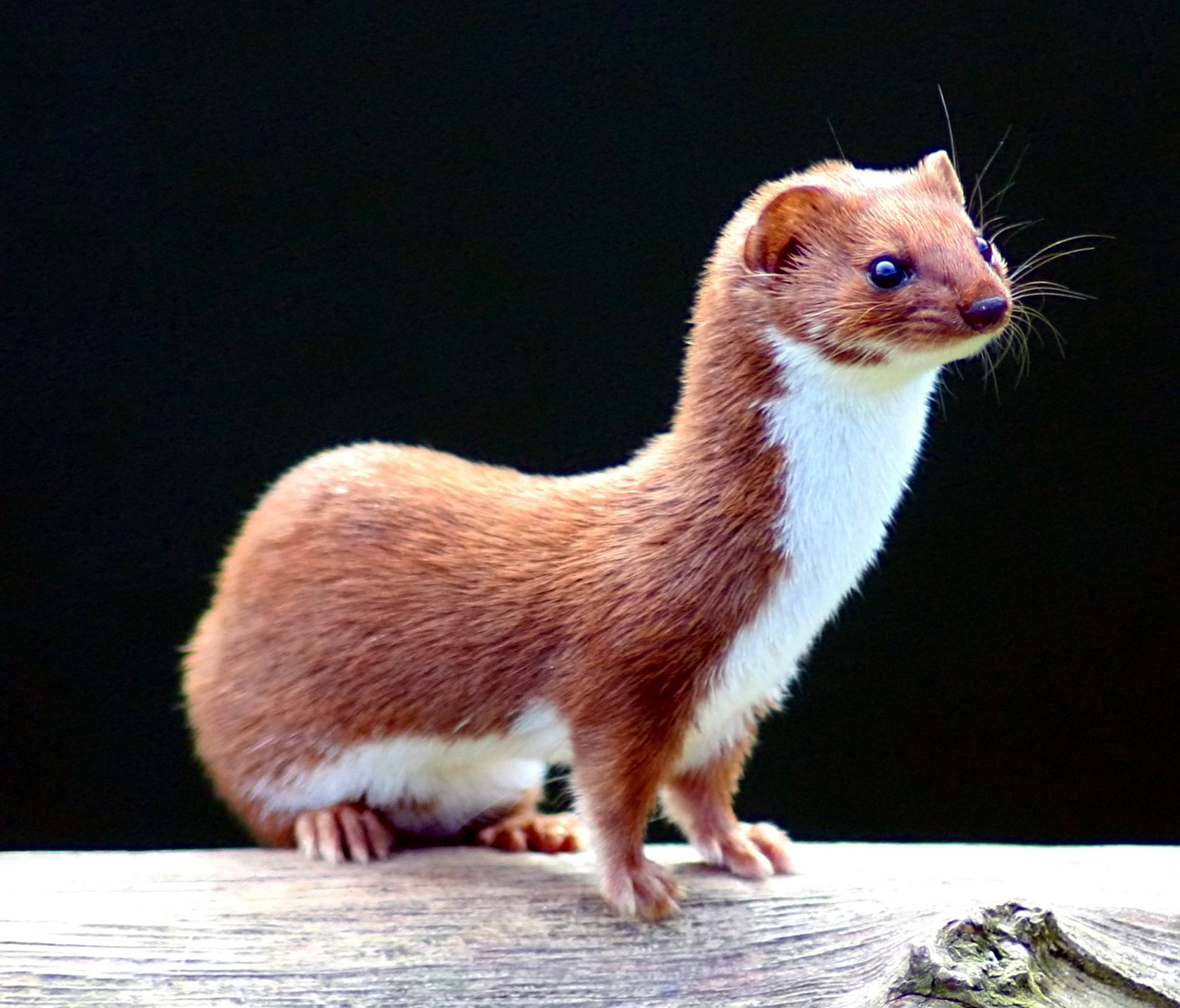
Least weasel

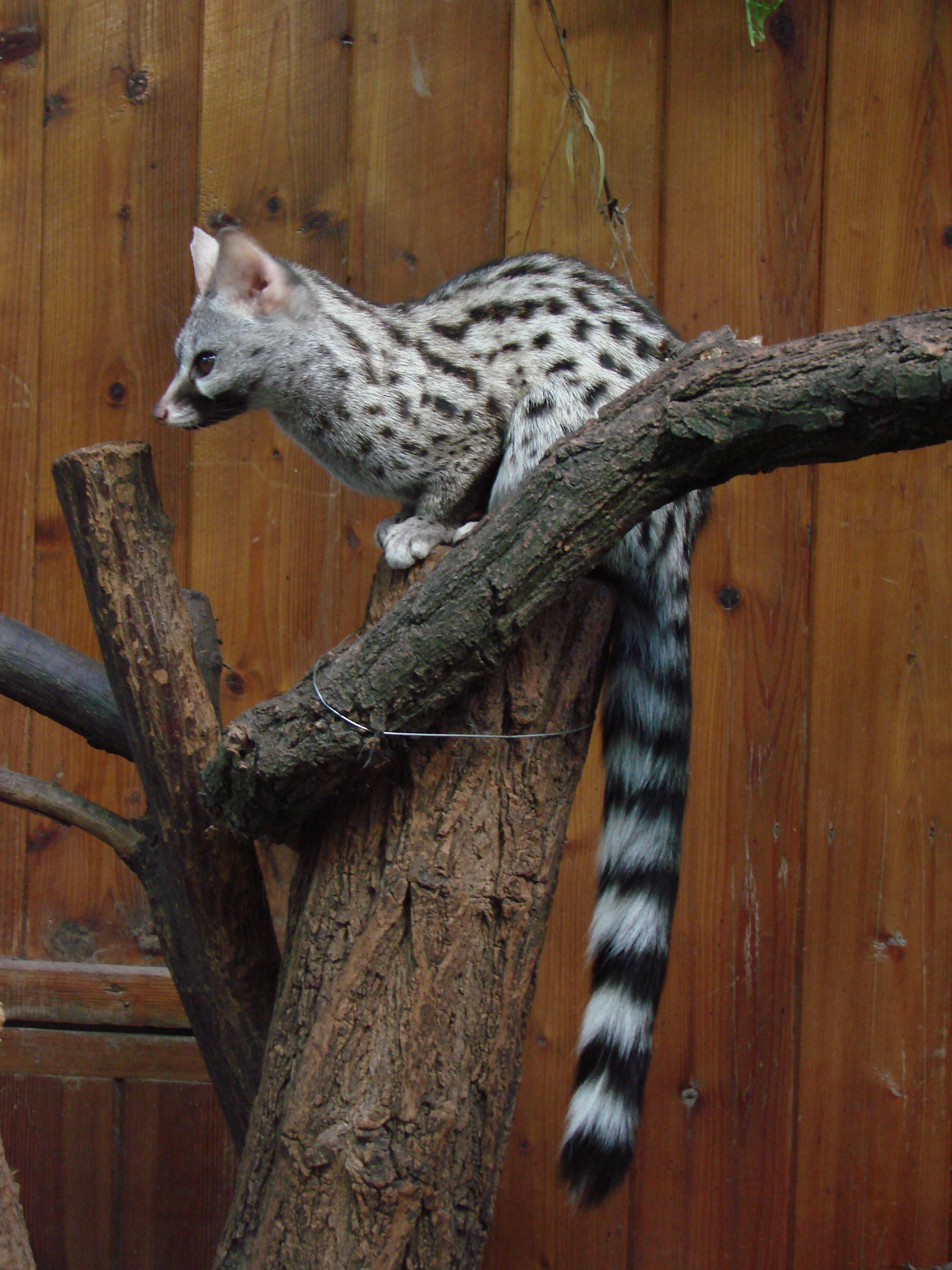
Common genet

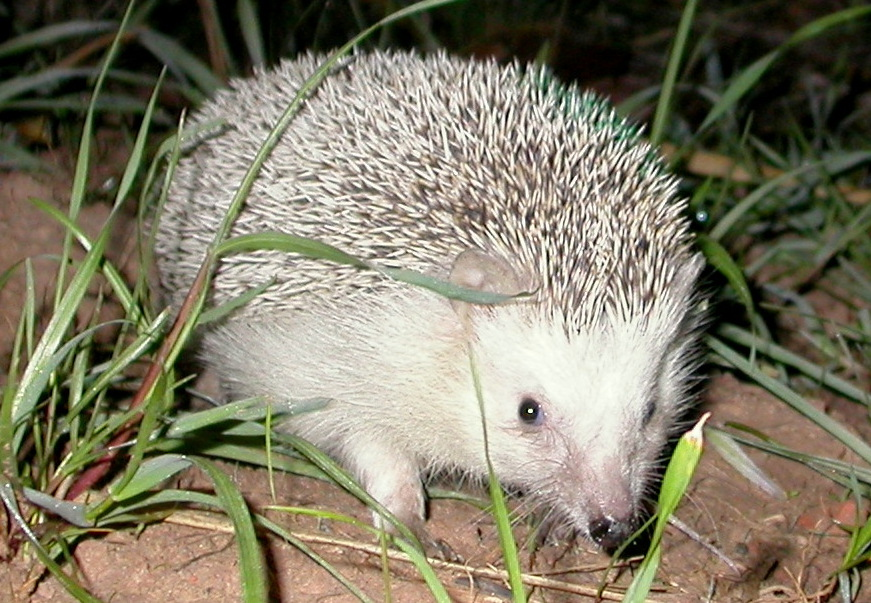
North African hedgehog

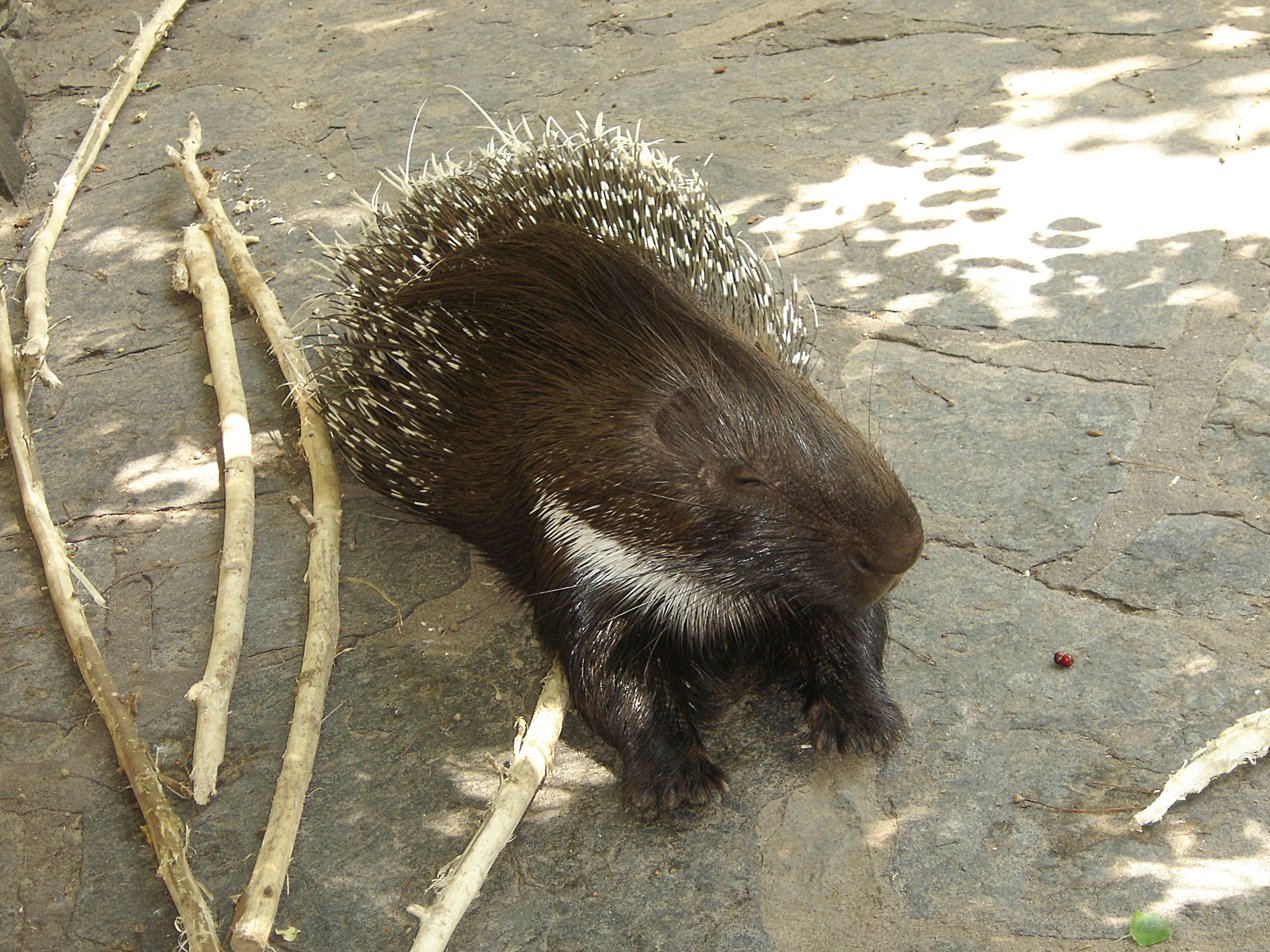
Porcupine

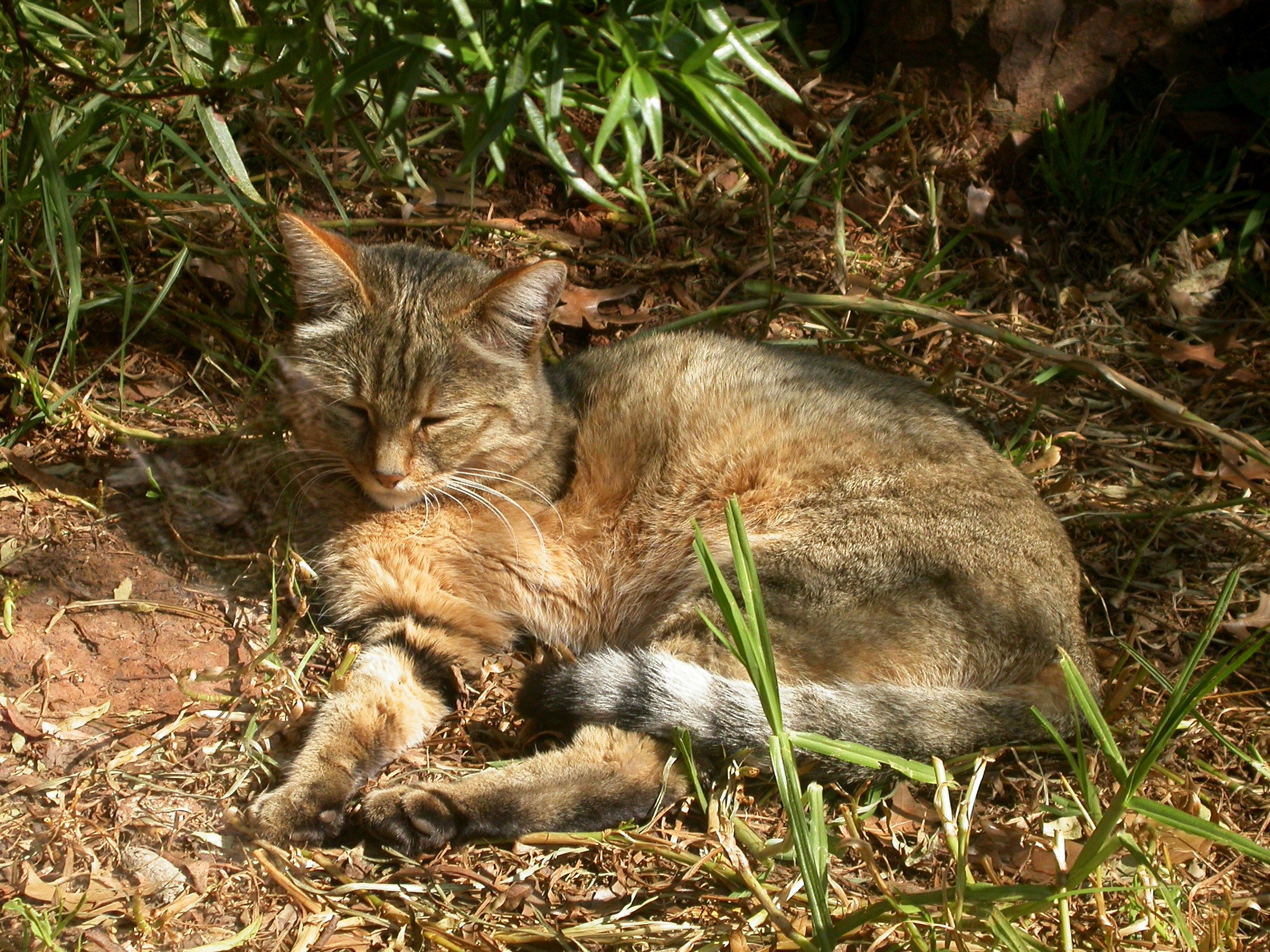
Wildcat

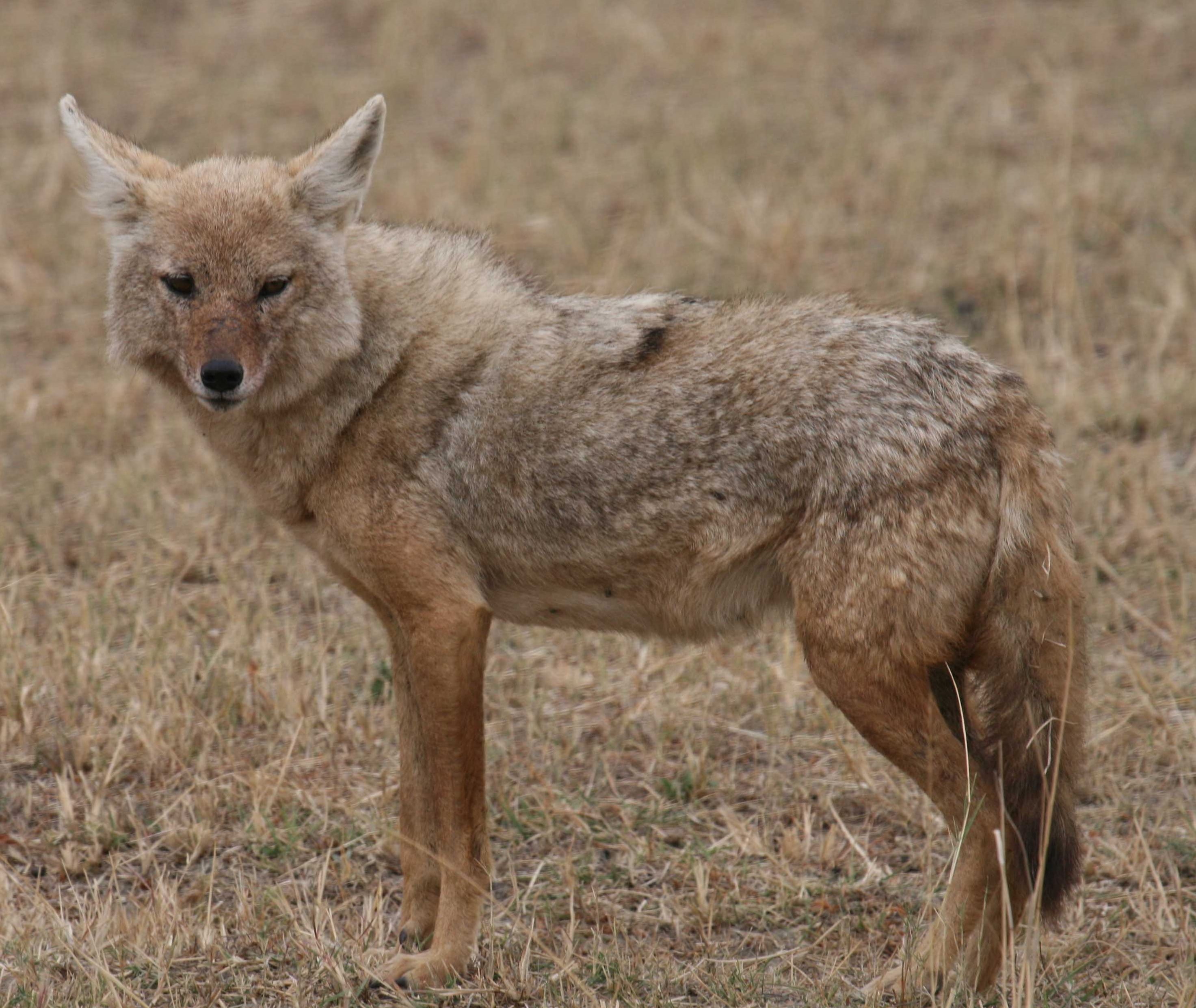
African wolf

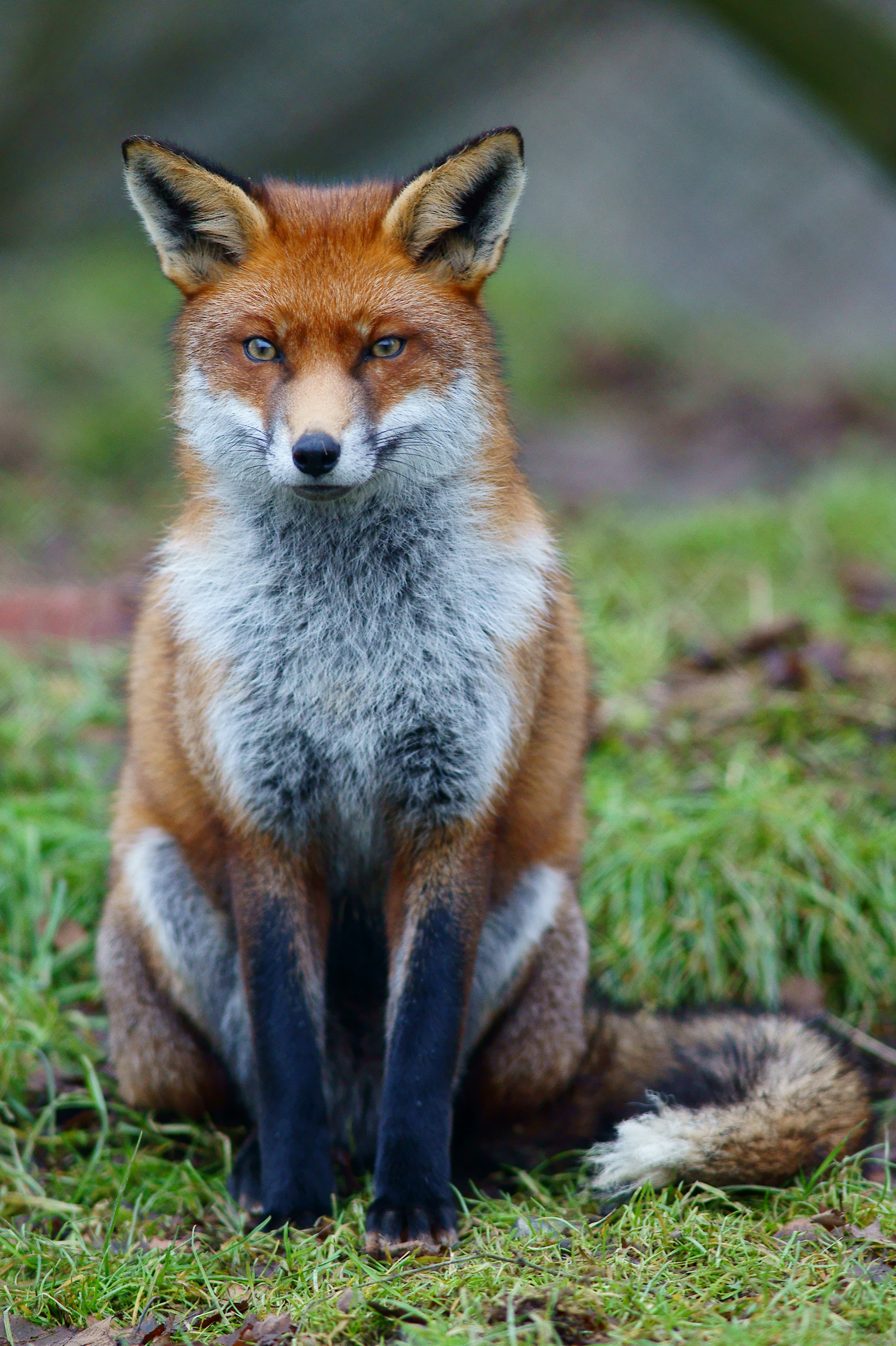
Red fox

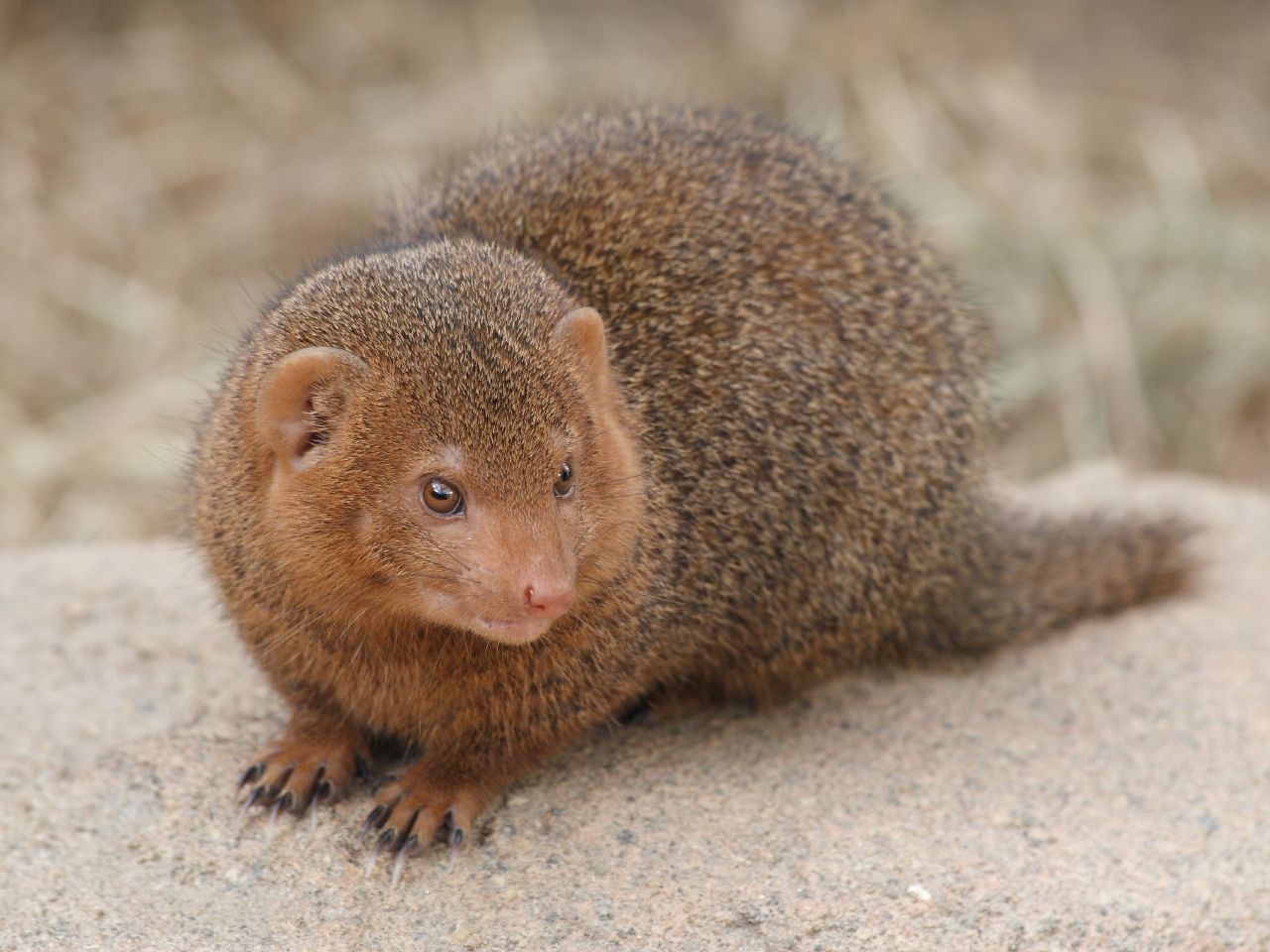
Mongoose

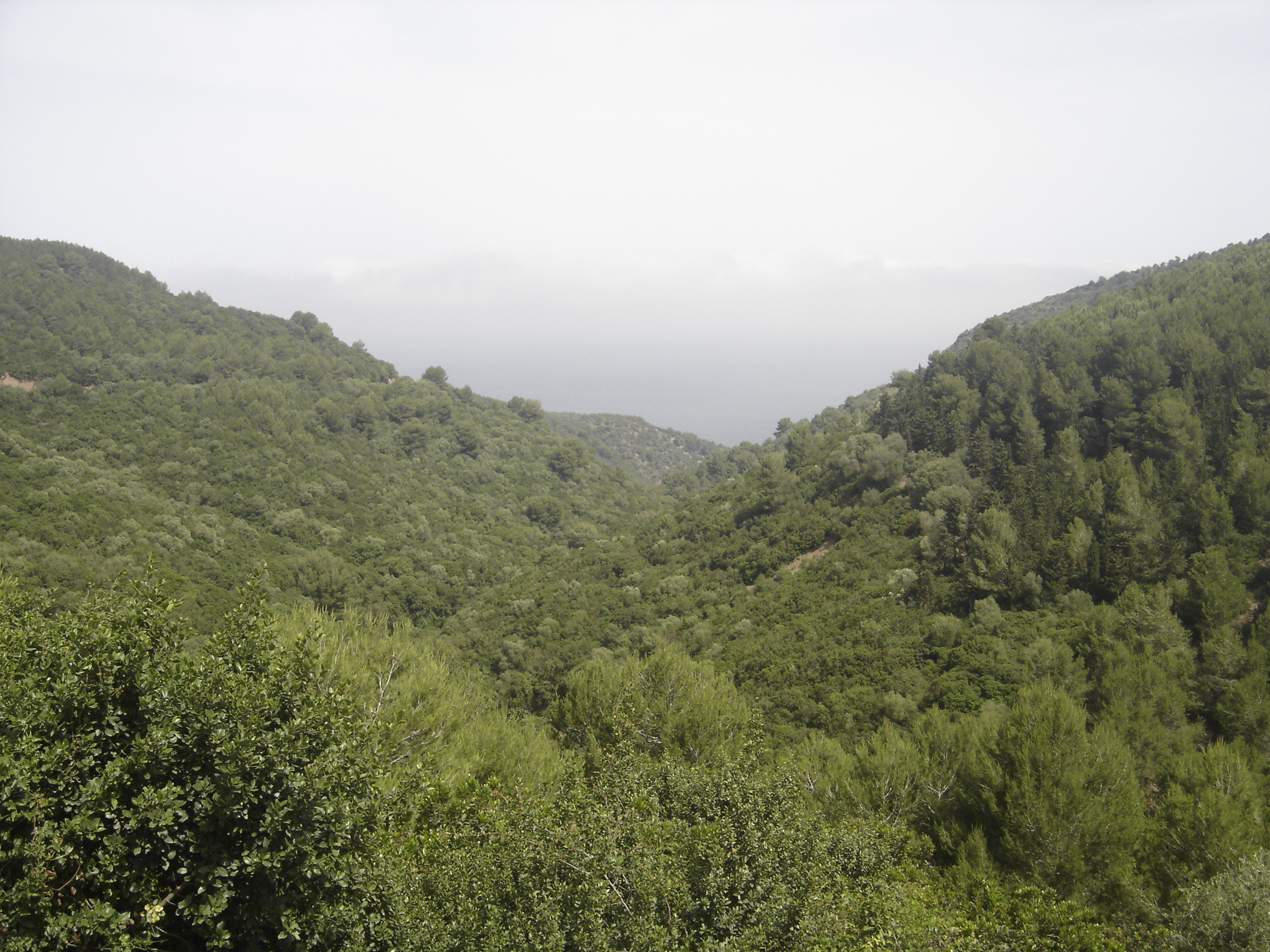
Bainam Forest

=== Nearby forests ===
- Bouzareah Forest
- Sidi Faraj Forest
- Zeralda Forest
- Bainam Forest
- Bouloghine Forest
- Muradia Forest
- Ben Aknoun Forest
- Haidara Forest
- Alqoba Forest
- Mahalma Forest
- Paradou Forest

== Astronomical observatory ==
The astronomical observatory was established at the top of Bouzareah Mountain in 1890 by the French and was named the Observatory of Algeria.

Those responsible for it at that time provided it with an astrograph, a Caudet telescope, and a tomographic radio telescope, in order to monitor selected areas and a map of the sky within a network of similar telescopes. The observatory's equipment and location are still fit for observation, and the observatory has a large library of books and magazines, both old and new.

This astronomical observatory was then transformed into the Institute of Geophysics of Algeria in 1931.

It then became the headquarters of the Center of Research in Astronomy, Astrophysics, and Geophysics in 1985.

It is currently dedicated to the study of earthquakes and other fields and relies on a large-type observatory and three satellites within the AlSAT project: AlSAT-1, AlSAT-2, and AlSAT-3.

The center contributes to the monitoring of the lunar crescent with the National Committee for the Lunar Observation and the Ministry of Religious Affairs and Endowments.

== Photo gallery ==
Location of Bouzareah Mountain

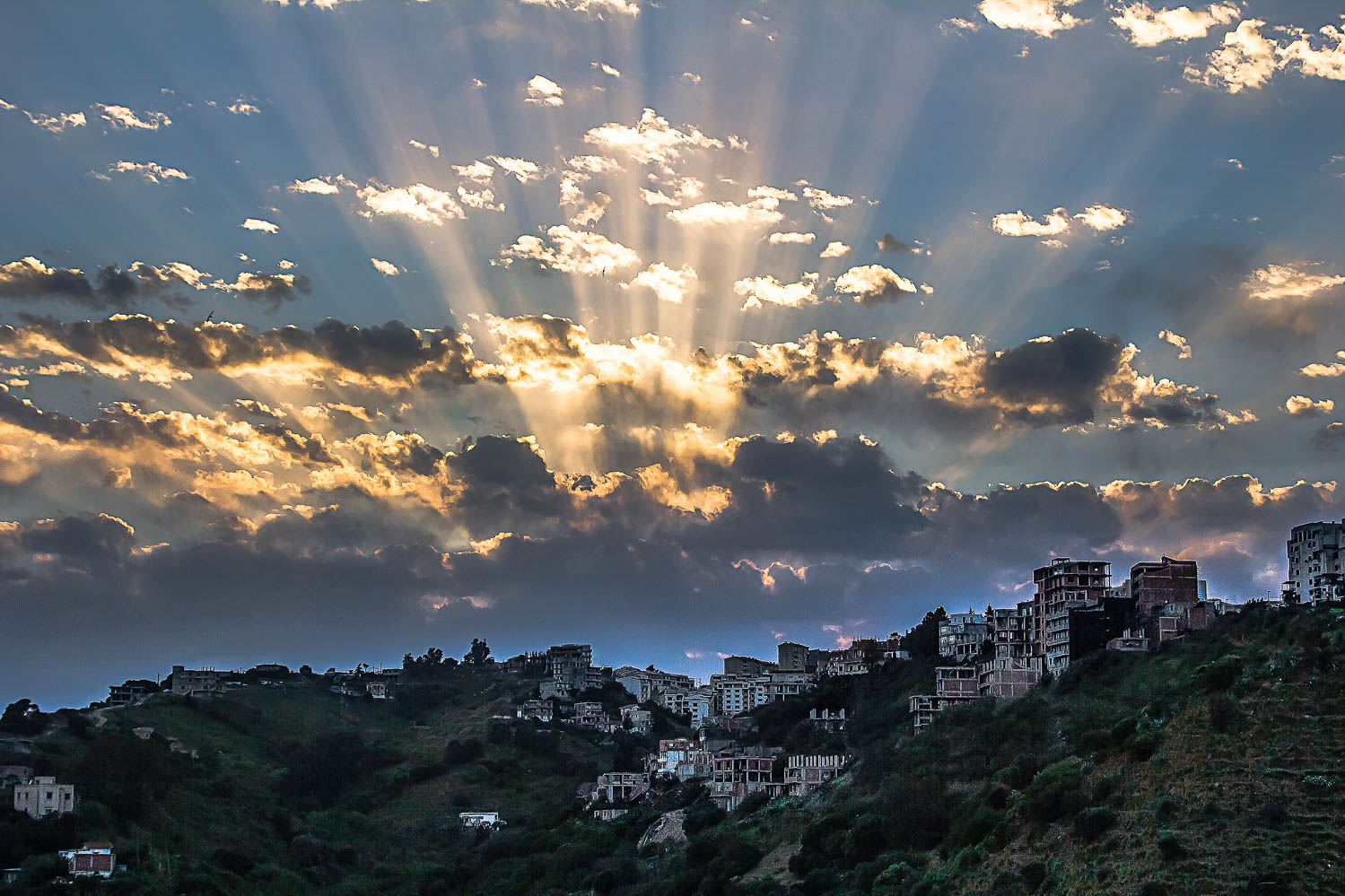
Bouzareah Mountain

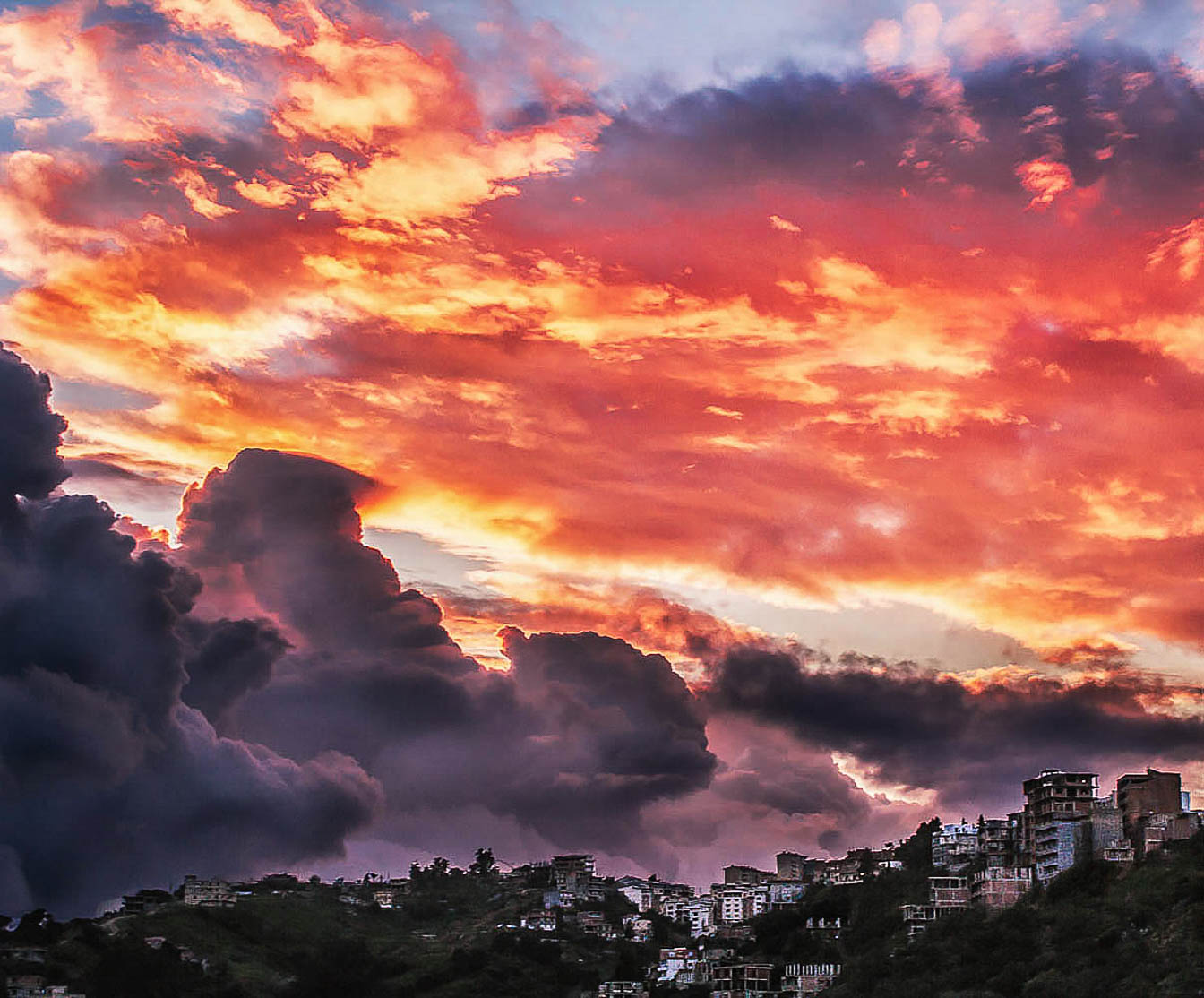
Bouzareah Mountain

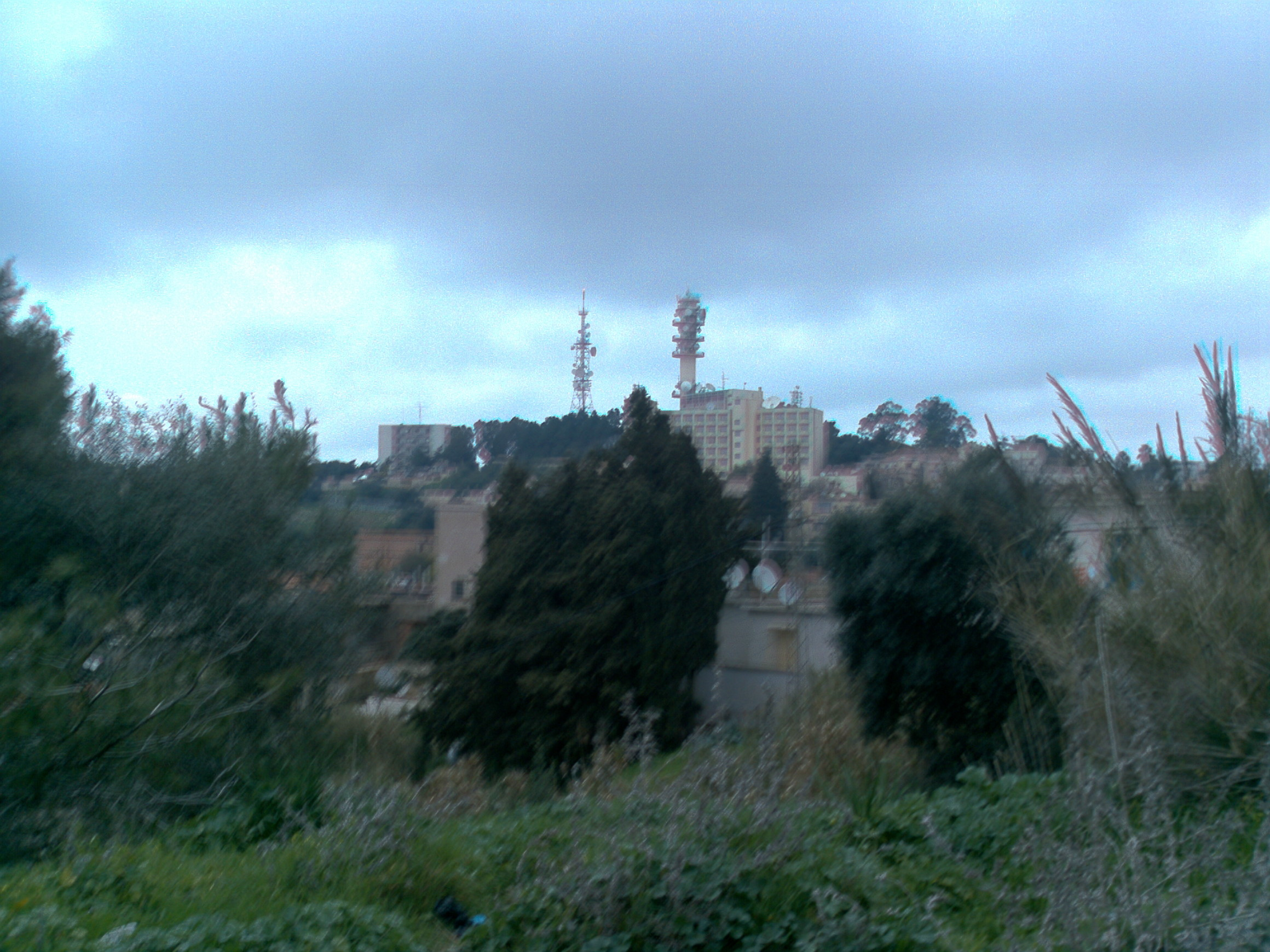
Bouzareah Mountain

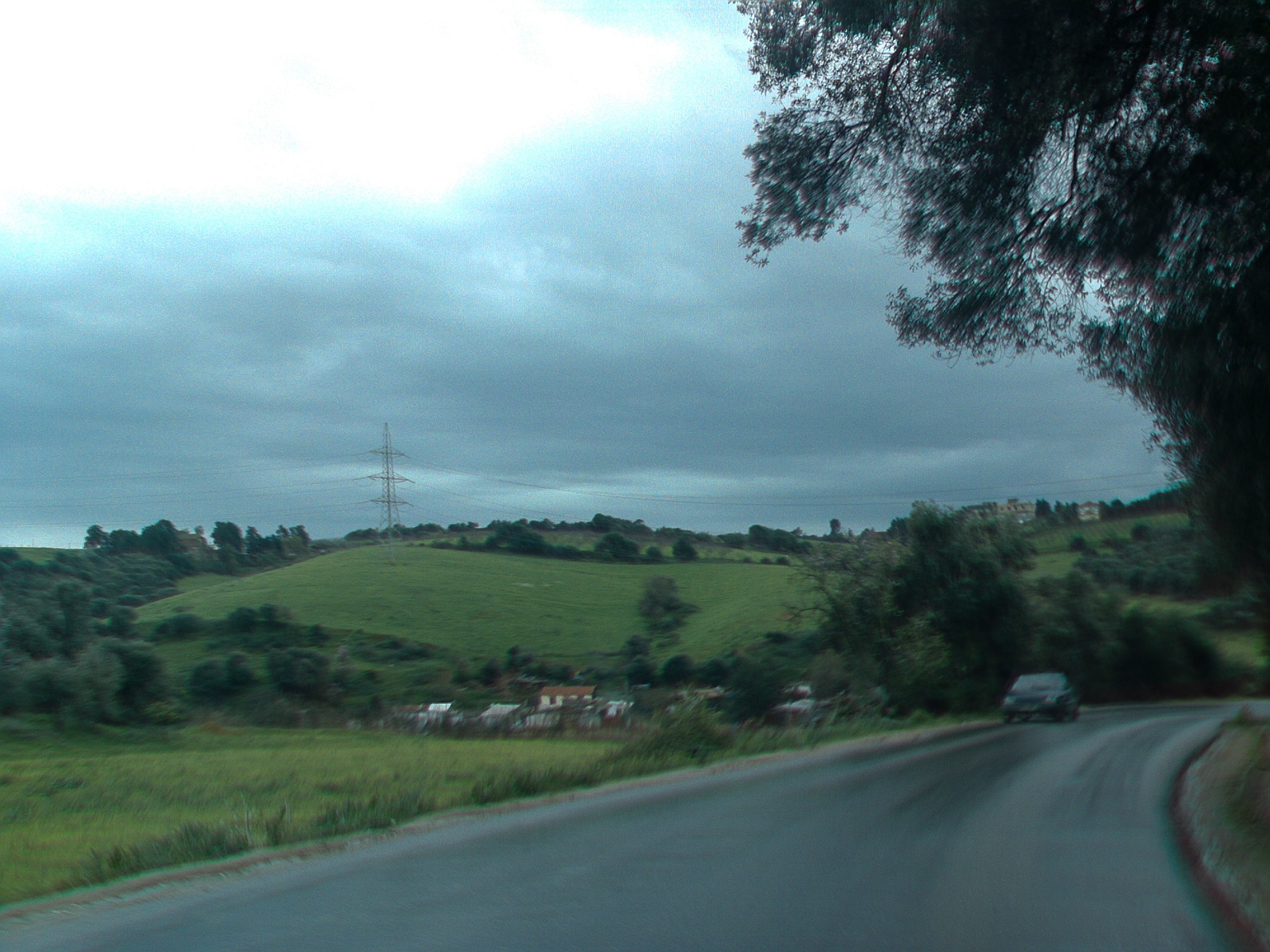
Road to Bouzareah Mountain

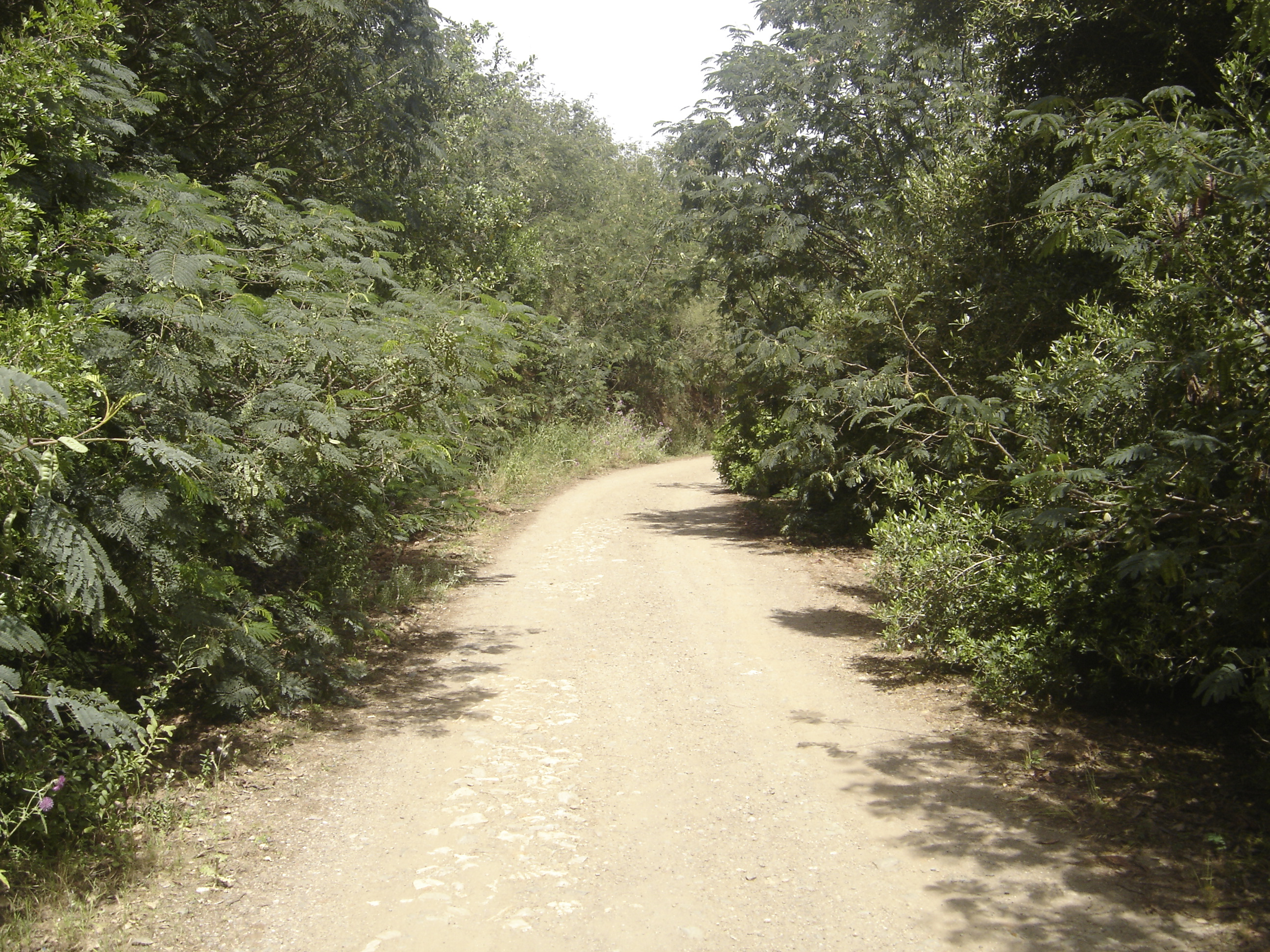
Bainam Forest

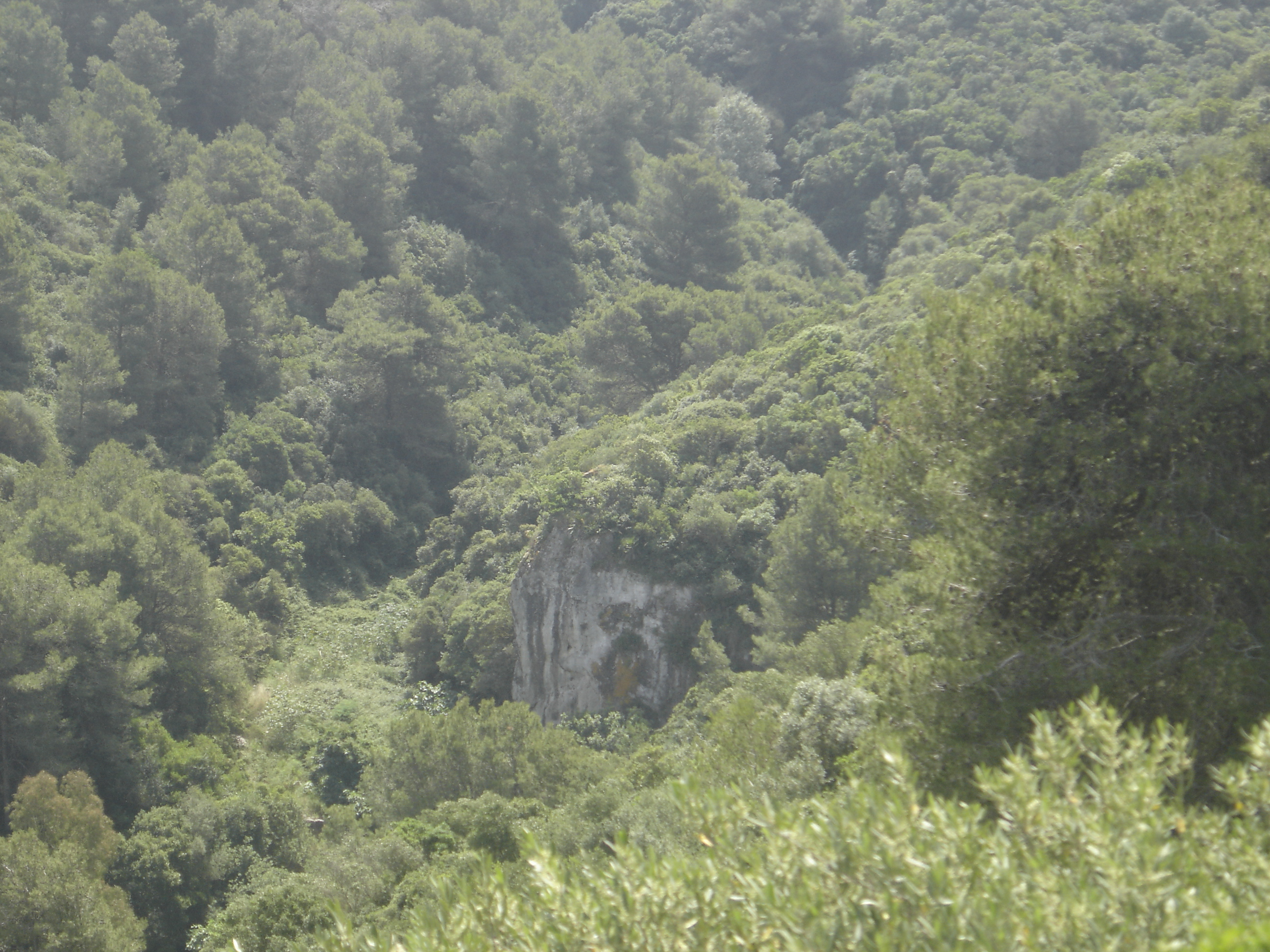
Bainam Forest

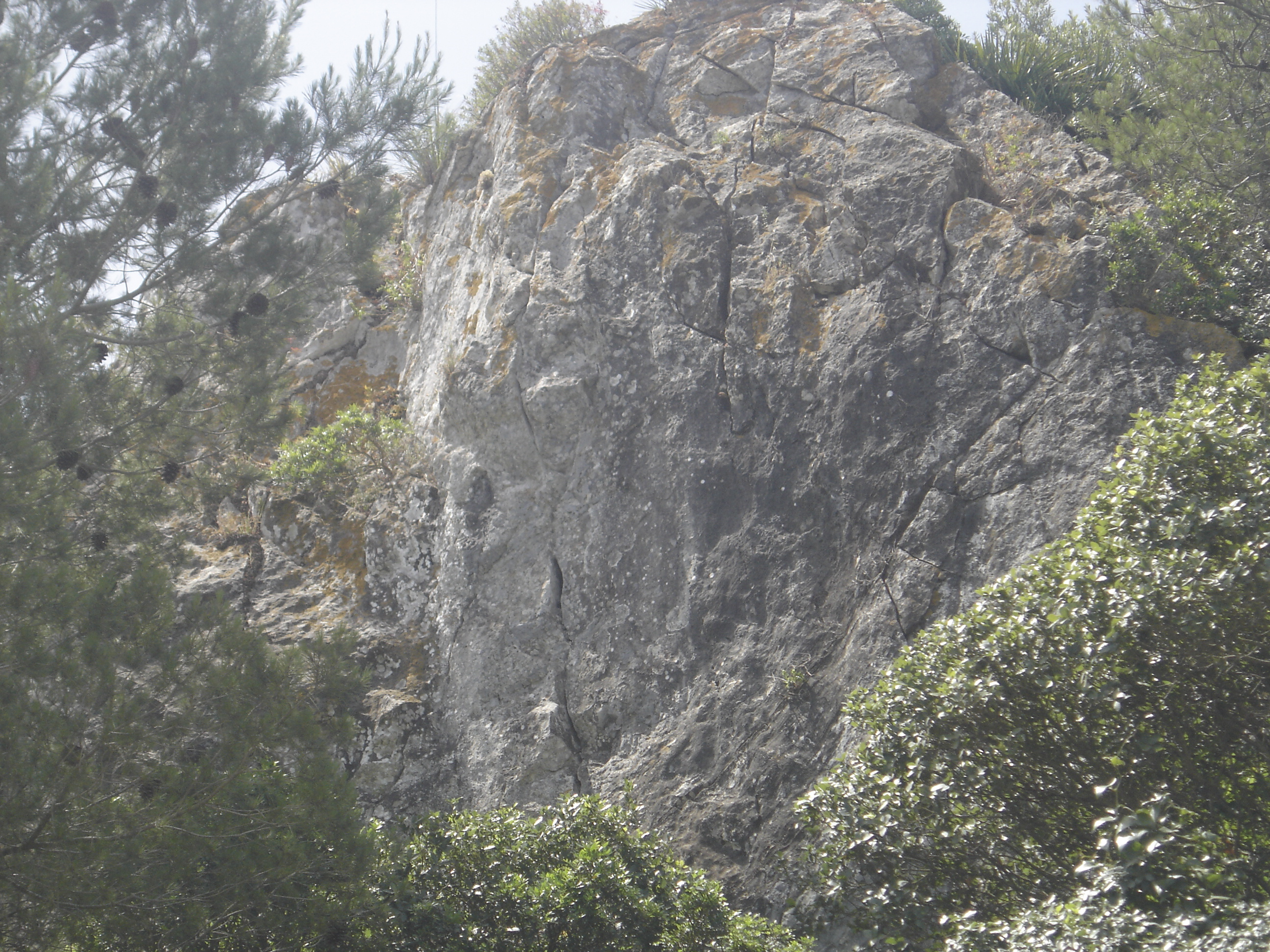
Bainam Forest

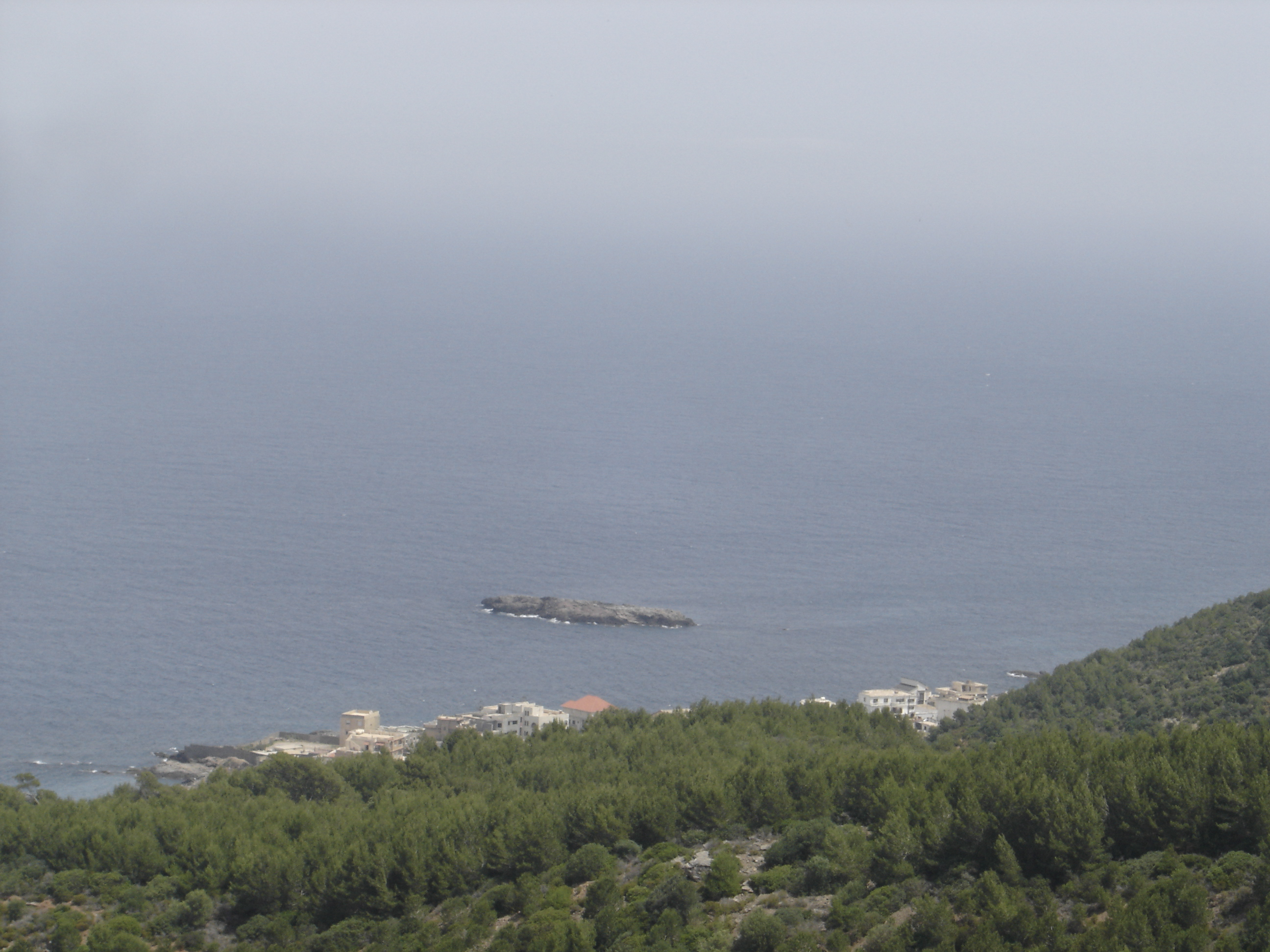
Bainam Forest

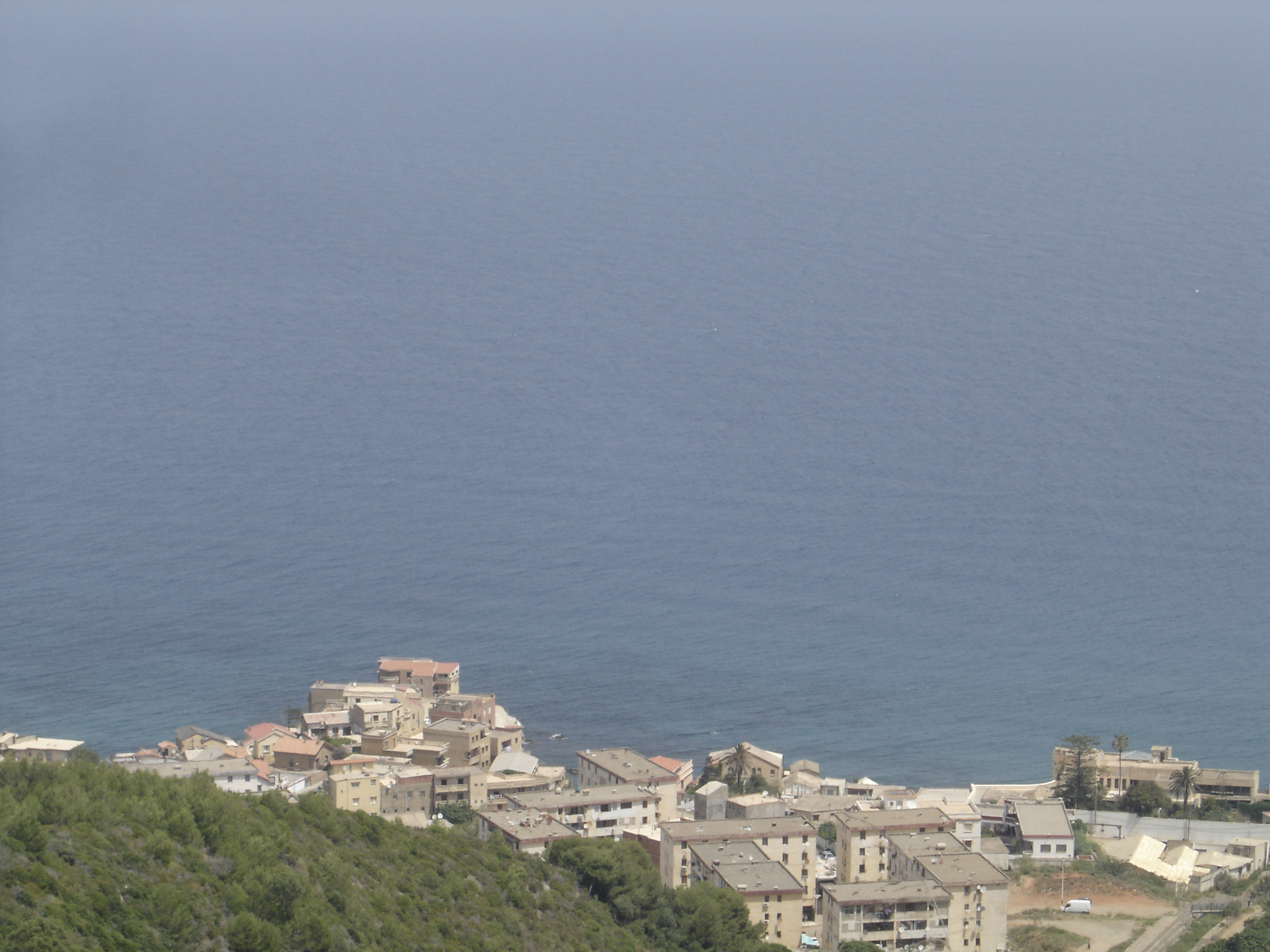
Bainam Forest

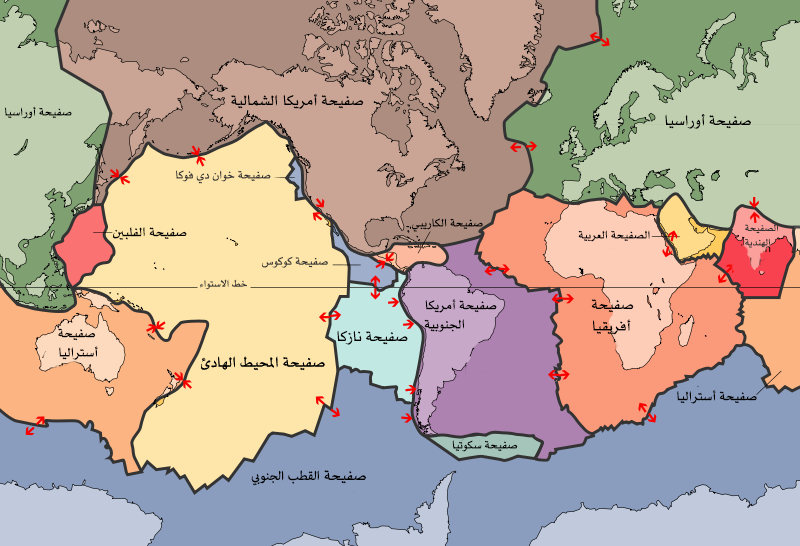
Plate tectonics

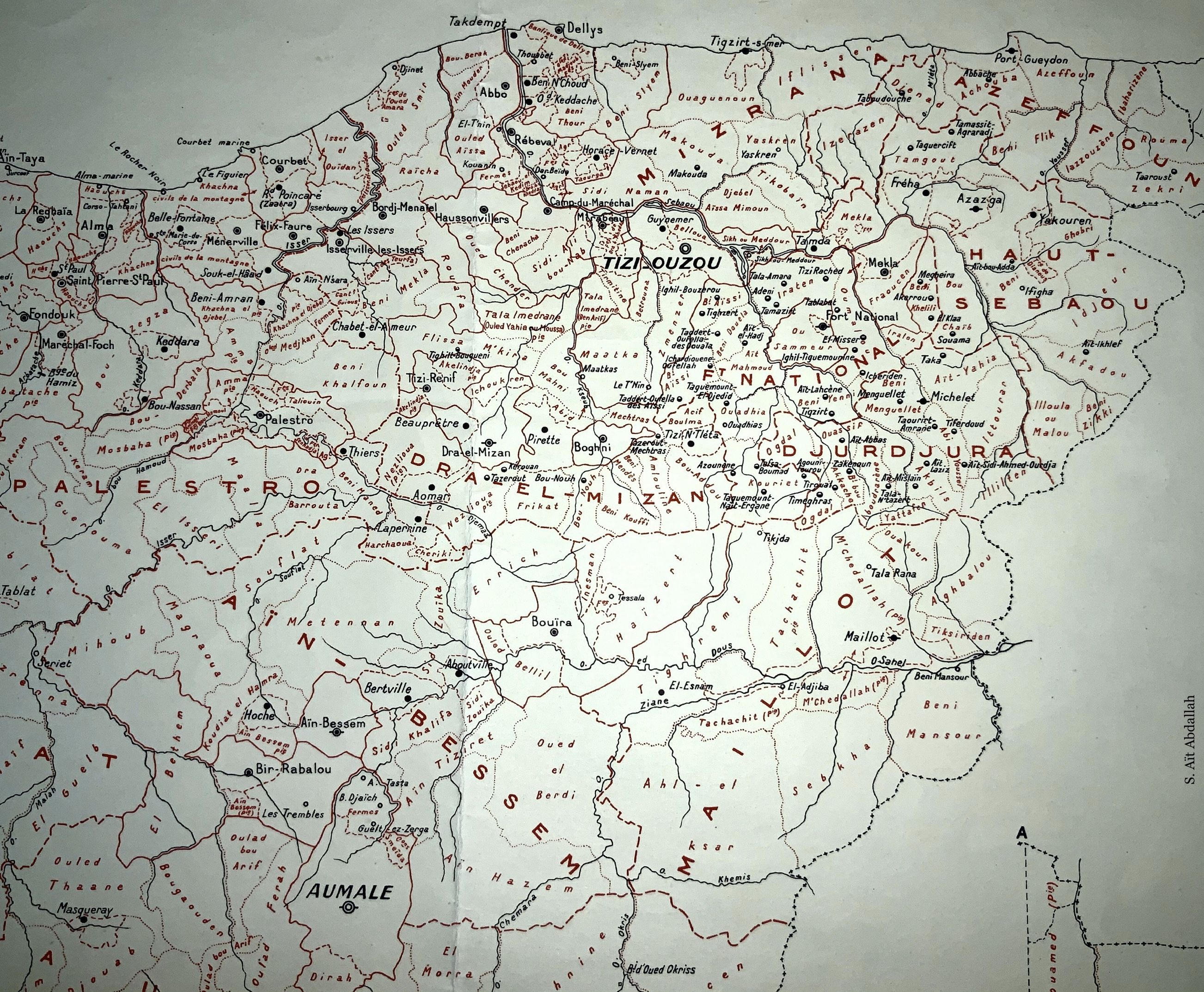
Kabylia

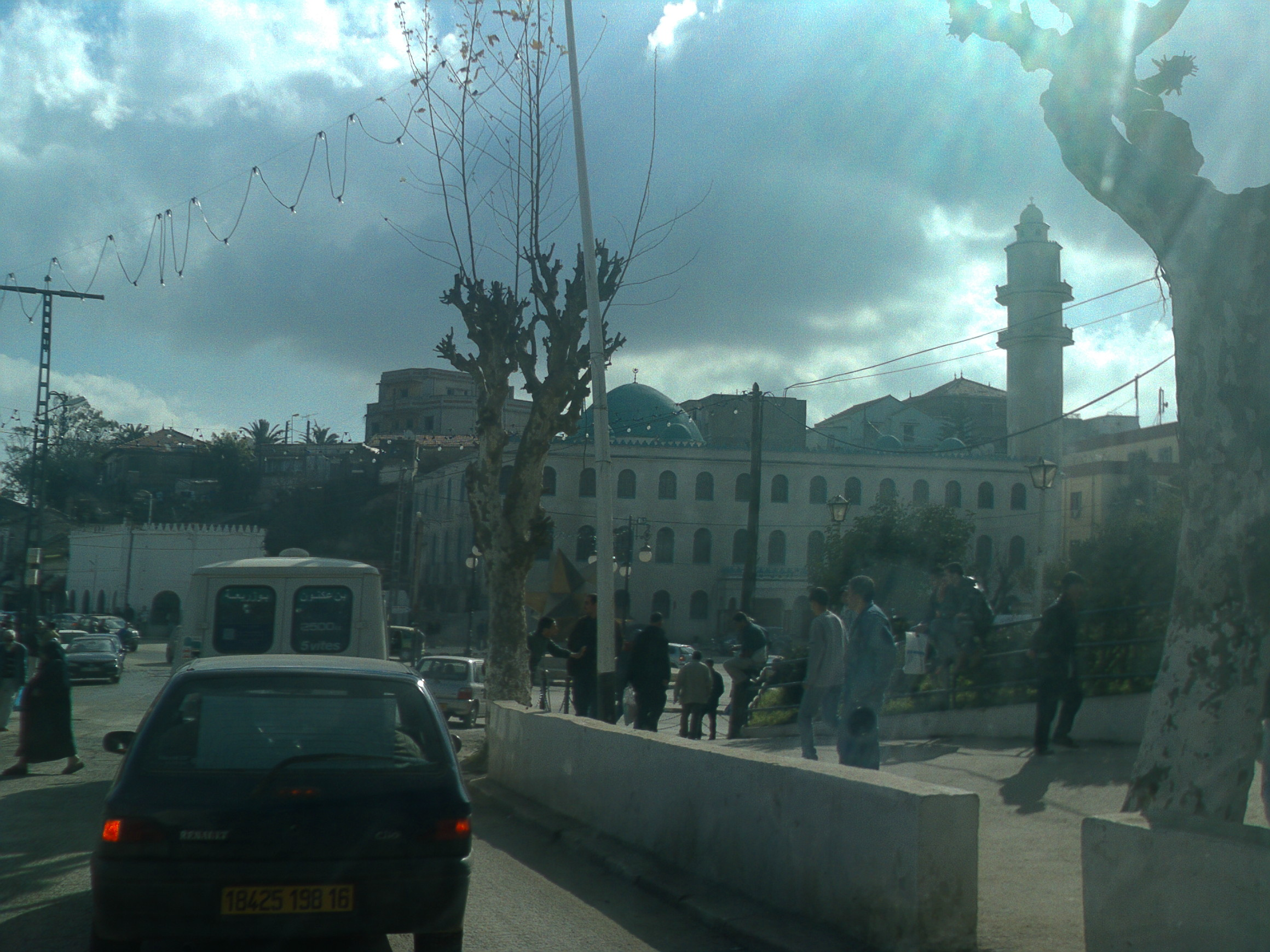
Bouzareah

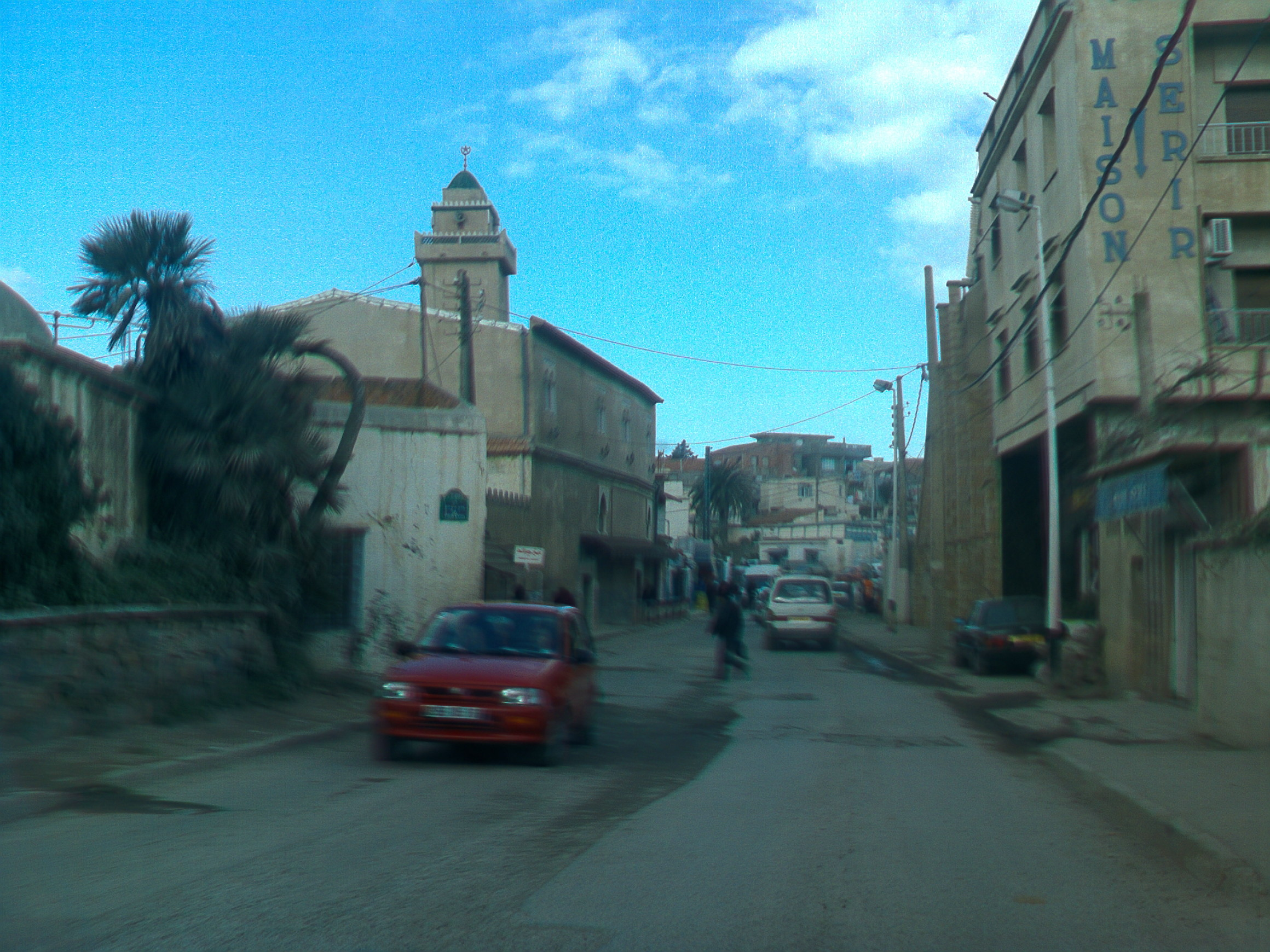
Bouzareah

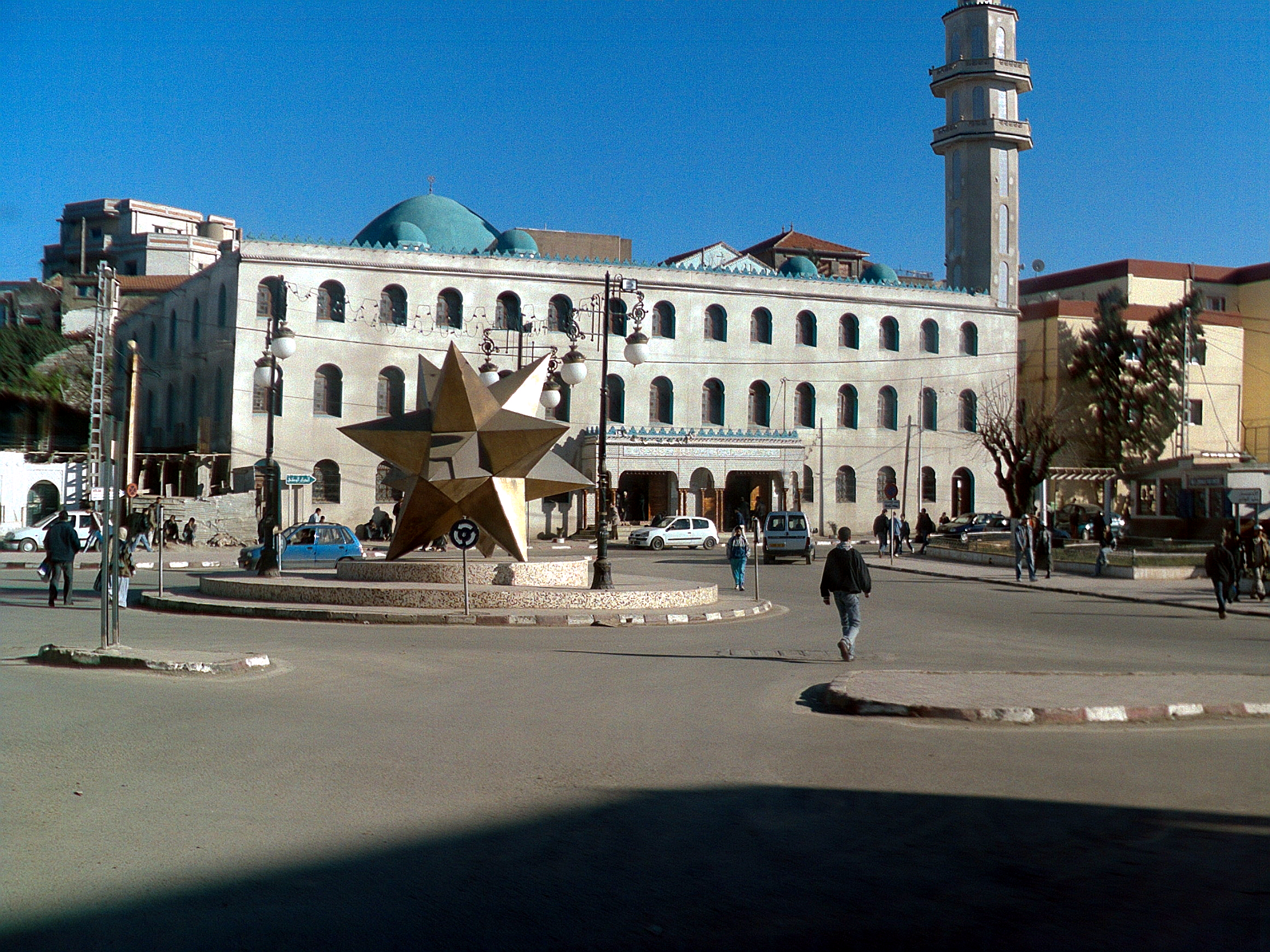
Bouzareah

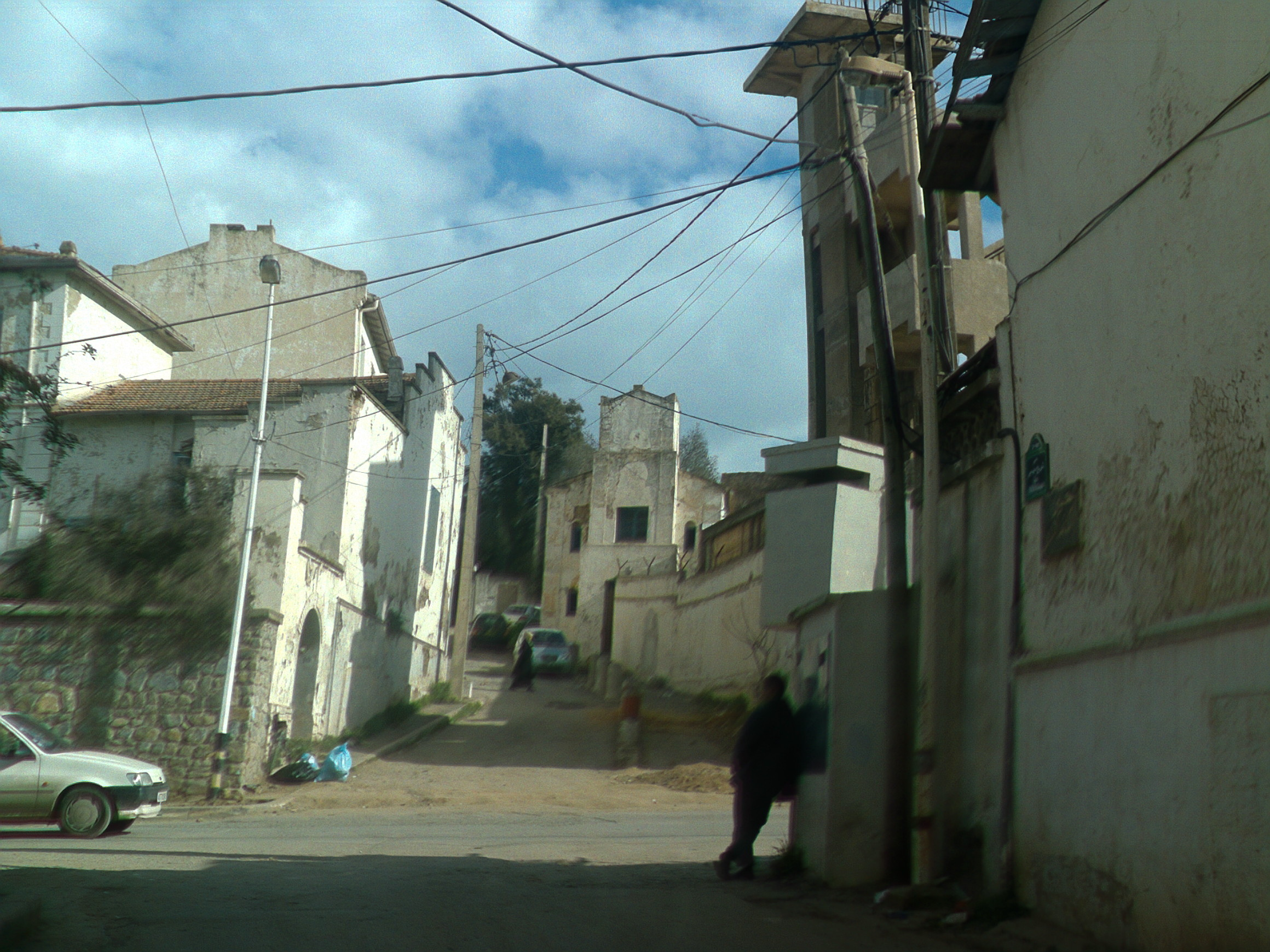
Bouzareah

== See also ==
=== Related articles ===
- Mount Chenoua
- Kabylia
- Tell Atlas
- Igawawen
- Mitidja
- Corso Valley

=== Videos ===
- Bouzareah Mountain.
- Bouzareah Mountain from the aerial elevator.
- The Teleferic to Bouzareah Mountain.
- The Teleferic to Bouzareah Mountain.
- The Teleferic to Bouzareah Mountain.
- The Teleferic to Bouzareah Mountain.
- Bainam Forest near Bouzareah Mountain.
- Bouzareah City.
- Bouzareah District.
- Old Bouzareah District.
- Entrance of Bainam Forest.
- Report about Bainam Forest.
- A tour to Bainam Forest.
- A view from Bainam Forest.
- A tour to Bainam Forest.
