= Mazafran River =

Watercourse in Algeria

Coordinates: 36°41′54″N 2°48′11″E

The Mazafran Oued is a river, with an estuary, in Algeria, North Africa.

== Characteristics ==
About 24 kilometres (15 mi) in length, the river passes through an area covered in woodlands, and some evidence of the Roman land ownership patterns are still discernable. The river, which flows into the Mediterranean, forms part of the border of the wilaya of Tipaza.

It is created by the confluence of the Chiffa River and the Djer River, and although not navigable, has been used traditionally for irrigation.

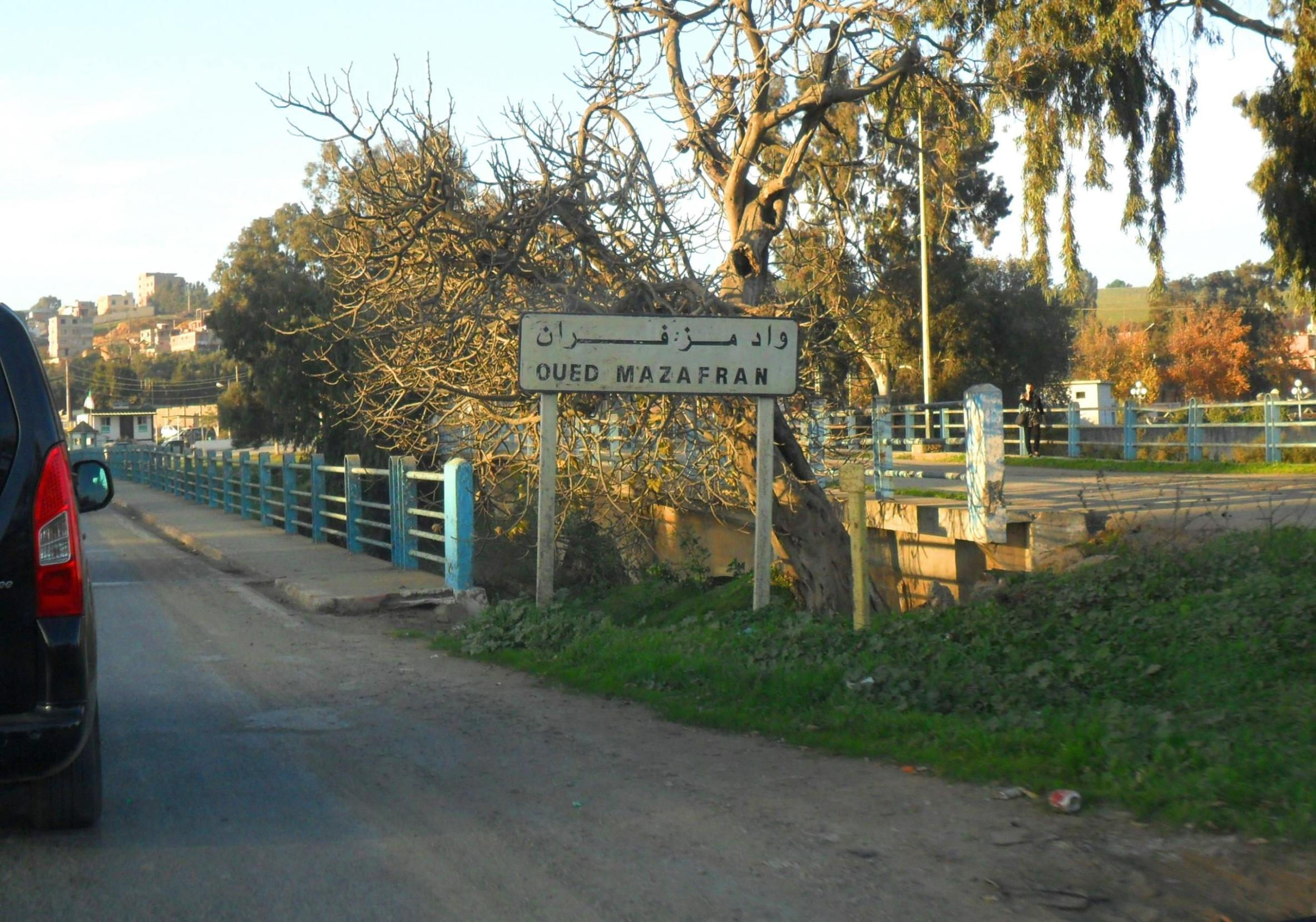
Mazafran River near Koléa

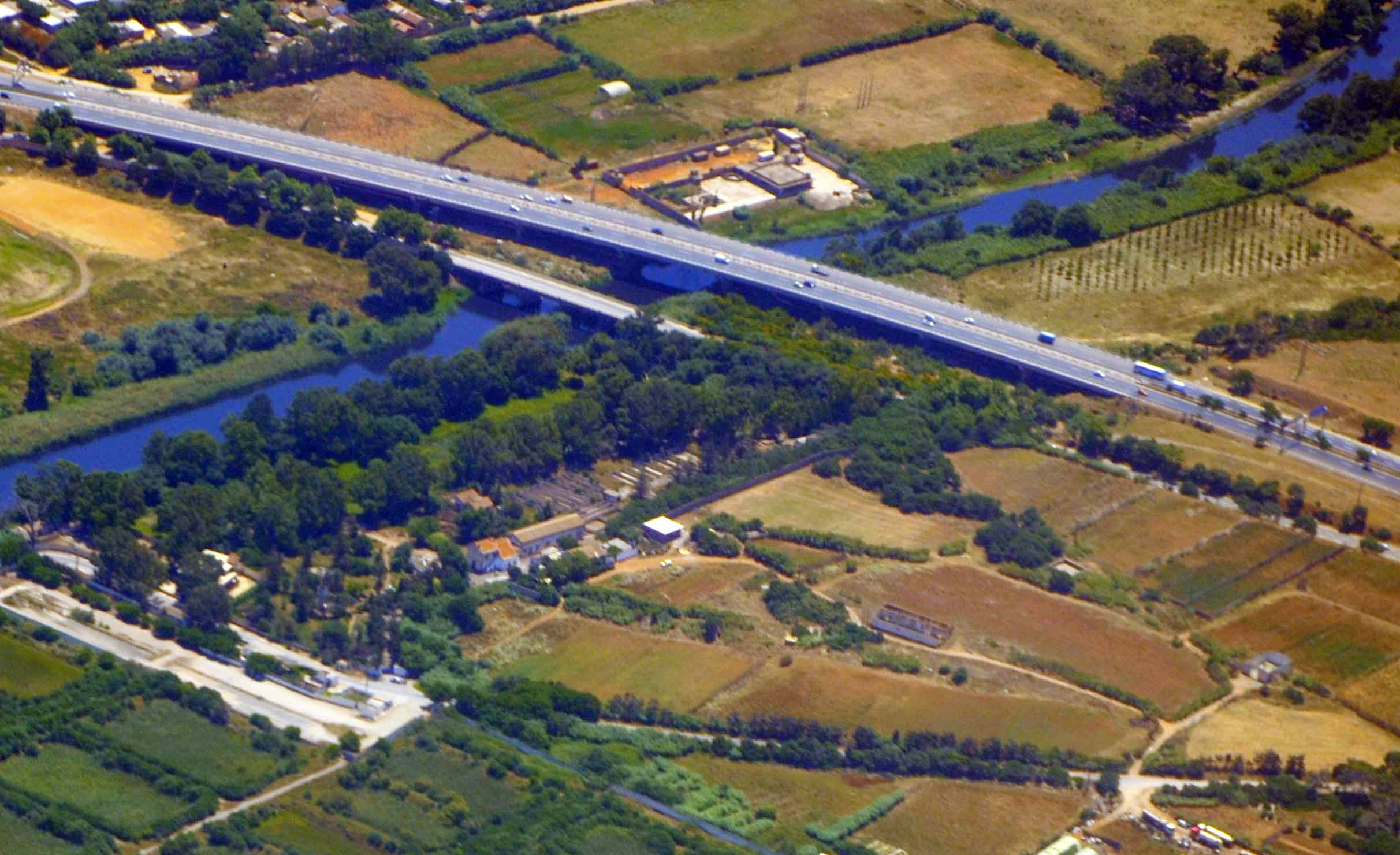
Oued Mazafran from the air.
