= On Wings of Eagles =

Book by Ken Follett

- First edition (UK)
- Author: Ken Follett
- Language: English
- Genre: Thriller/True story
- Publisher: HarperCollins (UK); William Morrow (US)
- Publication date: 1983
- Publication place: UK
- ISBN: 0-688-02371-1
- OCLC: 9466033
- Dewey Decimal: 955/.054 19
- LC Class: E183.8.I55 F64 1983
- Preceded by: The Man from St. Petersburg (1982)
- Followed by: Lie Down with Lions (1986)

On Wings of Eagles is a 1983 non-fiction thriller written by British author Ken Follett. Set against the background of the Iranian revolution, it tells a story based on the rescue of Paul Chiapparone and Bill Gaylord from prison in Tehran by a team of Electronic Data Systems executives led by retired Col. Arthur D. Simons.

The story, according to Follett, is not fictionalized or a 'non-fiction novel'.

== Production ==
Ross Perot contacted Ken Follett, who was paid by his publisher, to write On Wings of Eagles.

Follett based his account on 100 hours of taped interviews with the people directly involved, and had the drafts checked by them as well. Despite this, the book significantly embellishes the story, adding a firefight that never happened and invents the detail that Ross Perot was present to greet the detainees over the Turkish Border.

== Summary ==
In December 1978 two EDS executives working in pre-revolutionary Tehran are arrested on suspicion of bribery. Bail was set at US$13 million (90 million Iranian toman). When H. Ross Perot, head of the Dallas-based company hears about it, he decides to extract his employees regardless of cost. He orders the firm's lawyers to find a way to meet the bail. He recruits a team of volunteers from his executives, led by a retired United States Army officer, to break them out by force, if necessary. This team flies to Tehran.

Their well-rehearsed plan to break the two from jail fails because of a prison transfer. The team figures out another way to rescue their colleagues. This culminates in an overland escape to Turkey. Meanwhile, riots and violence dominate the streets of Tehran escalating daily. This culminates in the Iranian Revolution led by Khomeini against the Shah, endangering the other EDS employees as well.

The incident attracted attention from the press when it occurred in early 1979. Bill Gaylord and Paul Chiapparone, two U.S. citizens working in Iran for Electronic Data Systems (EDS), a Dallas-based computer services corporation, were jailed on 28 December 1978. They were victims of an anticorruption drive mounted during the Shah's last days in Iran, a drive based more on the politics of the moment than on legality or truth. Consequently, while the prosecutor who had them arrested did not file formal charges against the two, he set bail at $12,750,000.

Stunned by these arbitrary arrests, H. Ross Perot, founder and chairman of EDS, mobilized both his and the company's resources to get the two employees out of jail. He became personally engrossed in the effort to release Gaylord and Chiapparone. Perot began by trying traditional venues, such as lobbying the U.S. government for help, and seeking the counsel of lawyers.

He also organized a strike team. A retired army colonel, Arthur D. "Bull" Simons, was hired to train seven company volunteers to try to rescue the two jailed men. Working from their experiences in Tehran, the men trained at Perot's weekend house at the shore of Lake Grapevine near Dallas. Beginning 3 January 1979, they practiced assaults on a model of the Ministry of Justice prison in Tehran, where the EDS men were being held.

When all other means appeared to be failing, Perot asked Simons to proceed to Tehran with his team. While the team had trained on Walther PPK handguns, and had luggage with false bottoms to smuggle them in, Simons decided to leave the guns behind as more likely to cause problems than solve them. They flew to Iran in mid-January, closely followed by Perot himself, who insisted on overseeing the operation personally and who hoped that his presence would improve the spirits of his jailed employees.

Once in Tehran, Perot and Simons found that nothing worked as they had planned. The Ministry of Justice turned out to be far better protected than anyone had remembered. Additionally, Gaylord and Chiapparone had been transferred on 18 January to the Qasr Prison, one of Tehran's largest and best fortified jails. Though Simons knew his team could not attack Qasr on its own, he had studied history enough to realize that the revolution was soon going to peak. The Shah had fled Iran on 16 January. Khomeni was to return to the country from France on 1 February. Street mobs were likely to storm the prison and release the inmates. At the same time, EDS kept up its efforts to resolve the problem through legal means. U.S. banks refused to get involved in paying the bail, fearing involvement in matters of bribery and ransom. When one bank finally did cooperate with EDS, matters bogged down on the Iranian side. When all else failed, EDS lawyers tried to convince Iranian officers to accept the U.S. embassy in Tehran as bail—ironic in retrospect of the embassy's subsequent seizure by the Iranian government. All these efforts collapsed on 10 February.

Just one day later, Tehran street crowds erupted. Among them was Rashid, an ambitious young Iranian systems engineering trainee at EDS. Loyal to his U.S. employers and eager to help them win the release of their jailed colleagues, Follett describes him as the instigator of the mob's attack on Qasr prison.

Rashid's efforts were successful: Gaylord and Chiapparone fled the jail along with the other prisoners. A few hours later they met at Simons' room at the Hyatt Crown Tehran.

The escape from prison was easier than exiting the country. Gaylord and Chiapparone were wanted by the police. Neither had passports and so could not depart legally.

Simons divided the remaining EDS employees in Tehran into two groups. The less suspicious were to leave via airplane from Tehran. The more vulnerable, including the two fugitives, were to go to Turkey in two Range Rovers. Rashid accompanied the latter group on their 450-mile (720 km) trip across northwest Iran. In two days of driving they repeatedly came close to capture. On almost every occasion, Rashid's quick wit saved them. When he and the six Americans crossed the Turkish border, they were met by an EDS employee waiting with a bus and a charter plane. One day later, 17 February, they reached Istanbul, where an anxious Perot had been pacing up and down his hotel room. That the fugitive pair lacked passports and had entered Turkey illegally, rendered even the Turkish portion of the journey somewhat risky.

On the same day the overland team reached Istanbul, the other EDS employees left Tehran by plane—barely escaping the same prosecutor who earlier had jailed their colleagues. The two teams met in Frankfurt, Germany, and flew together (via an emergency landing in England) to the United States. All of them, including Rashid, arrived on 18 February.

== Reception ==
The book was a #1 international bestseller.

== Miniseries ==
In 1986 a five-hour miniseries of the same name was released, starring Burt Lancaster as Arthur D. "Bull" Simons and Richard Crenna as Ross Perot. It was watched by an estimated 25 million Americans.

== See also ==
- Argo – film by Ben Affleck
- Whirlwind – 1986 novel by James Clavell based on the struggle of Bristow Helicopters pilots to extract themselves and their equipment from Iran after the revolution.
