= Code to Zero =

2000 novel by Ken Follett

- First edition
- Author: Ken Follett
- Language: English
- Genre: Thriller
- Publisher: Pan Macmillan
- Publication date: 2000
- Publication place: United Kingdom
- Media type: Print (paperback and hardcover)
- Pages: 384
- ISBN: 0-333-78076-0
- OCLC: 46332093

Code to Zero is a novel by the British author Ken Follett, published by Pan Macmillan. The story follows Luke, an amnesic who spends the duration of the book learning of his life, and slowly uncovering secrets of a conspiracy to hold the United States back in the space race.

It is set out in both chapters and parts. There are six parts to the book, and an unspecified number of chapters which are titled by the time of day they are set, rather than the more common numbering system.

== Plot summary ==
In America 1958, a man wakes up in a railway station public toilet with no recollection of his past. His clothing, associates and surroundings suggest to him that he is an alcoholic derelict, however his behaviour, intelligence, morals and instinct lead him to investigate and research his past. He establishes (by the simple method of going into a library and pulling books off shelves until he finds one that he understands) that he is in fact Dr Lucas - a rocket scientist, and well known in his field. He further establishes that he is directly responsible for the design of a rocket due to be launched by America in an attempt to match the Soviet Sputnik, and bolster America's entry into what would become the Space Race.

Several people from his past both help and hinder his progress, and the implication is made that he himself was a Soviet spy, and had his memory erased instead of being killed - although this theory is made suspect when his old college friend reveals that he himself was once a Soviet spy and subsequently turned (but not entirely forgiven) by Lucas.

The actual spies (and saboteur) are revealed to be both his wife and another close friend, who plan on using the rocket's self-destruct mechanism to destroy the rocket as it is launched, either removing America from the Space Race, or putting their progress back so far that the Soviets will be hard to catch.

The plot is foiled with seconds to spare, and his wife apparently commits suicide rather than being caught by driving her car into the sea. The second saboteur is shot and killed in a gun battle prior to Lucas' wife's suicide.

== Adaptation ==
In July 2000, producer Douglas Wick bought the film rights for the novel.

In October 2015, Tandem Productions announced that a TV miniseries for Code to Zero is in the works. StudioCanal bought Tandem in 2020 and production on this miniseries is seemingly halted.

Tandem Productions had previously adapted two more of Follet’s novels: The Pillars of the Earth, and World Without End.
