= Omni International Jet Trading =

Omni International Jet Trading is a company offering private aircraft and jets for sale as an aircraft broker.

Omni International became a member of the National Business Aviation Association in 1966.

== Timeline ==
1963 - Wayne J. Hilmer Sr. founds Omni Aircraft Sales in Washington, DC near Watergate hotel.

1967 - Omni Aircraft Sales is featured in Washingtonian Magazine after purchasing the former Shah of Iran's jet.

1973 - Omni Aircraft Sales purchases Frank Sinatra's Gulfstream II.

1975 - Omni Aircraft Sales sells Elvis's Gulfstream G-I and Jet Commander.

1976 - Omni Aircraft Sales Aircraft purchases and resells the executive Playboy DC-9 aircraft belonging to Hugh Hefner.

1977 - Omni Aircraft Sales attends the 1976 Paris Air Show trading in aircraft belonging to Elvis Presley, Frank Sinatra and Prince Fahd of Saudi Arabia.

1978 - Omni Aircraft Sales leases a Boeing 707 to Ross Perot for rescue of EDS employees from Tehran. The story would later be chronicled in Ken Follett's bestselling book "On Wings of Eagles".

1983 - Omni Jet Trading Floor creates the first computer database of all jet owners and operators.

1984 - Omni International Corporation indicted. Case dismissed due to government misconduct.

1985 - Omni Jet Trading builds an executive FBO facility at Easton, Maryland.

1988 - Wayne J. Hilmer Jr. becomes president of Omni Jet Trading Floor.

1990 - Omni consolidates aircraft sales with its FBO operation in Easton, Maryland as the Omni Jet Trading Center

2000 - Omni trades as Omni International Jet Trading. The company is featured in many jet aircraft industry publications.

Omni operates remote offices in Moscow, Singapore, London, Kiev, Paris, Mexico City, Beirut, Mumbai, Brazil, Orlando, Jacksonville, Miami, Tucson, Indiana and Michigan.
