= Operation Plumbat =

Israeli covert operation in 1968 to steal processed uranium ore

Operation Plumbat was an Israeli covert operation in 1968 to steal yellowcake (processed uranium ore) to support the Israeli nuclear weapons program.

France stopped supplying Israel with uranium fuel for the Dimona nuclear reactor after the 1967 Arab-Israeli War. Numerous sources show that in 1968 Israel stole 200 tonnes of yellowcake from the Belgian mining company Union Minière, which shipped processed uranium mined in Shinkolobwe, in the present-day Haut-Katanga Province of Democratic Republic of the Congo, out of Antwerp to Genoa for a European front company by transferring the ore to another vessel at sea. This Mossad covert operation violated Euratom controls of nuclear materials. Israel used the yellowcake to develop its nuclear arsenal.

The name of Operation Plumbat is derived from the Latin "plumbum", meaning lead, and is a reference to the labeling of the drums used to transport the yellowcake.

== Mossad operation ==
Mossad agents arranged to set up a fictitious company called Biscayne Trader's Shipping Corporation in Liberia to purchase an ocean freighter; this became Scheersberg A (Scheersberg is a town in northern Germany, near the border with Denmark). With the assistance of a friendly official at a German petrochemical company, $3.7 million was paid to Union Minière for 200 tonnes of yellowcake uranium. The yellowcake was left over inventory from uranium mined from Shinkolobwe, in upper Katanga. This was loaded onto the newly renamed freighter and a contract was arranged with an Italian paint company for the yellowcake to be processed.

The cargo was loaded in November 1968 in barrels marked "PLUMBAT" (a harmless lead product). The Spanish crew were replaced by sailors recruited by Mossad and forged passports provided. The freighter sailed for Genoa on November 17. Approximately seven days into her voyage, she rendezvoused with an Israeli freighter under cover of darkness, somewhere east of Crete. The cargo was transferred in near silence whilst Israeli gunboats kept watch nearby. After loading the Israeli freighter set sail toward Haifa, and eventually the Tunnel, a six-level automated chemical plant for processing fuel rods into plutonium at Dimona.

Scheersberg A docked in Turkey eight days later; without any cargo to deliver, the contract with the Italian paint company was cancelled. Several pages were missing from the ship's log and no explanation was offered; the Italian paint company assumed the cargo had been lost to hijack or piracy.

== Mossad operative confession ==
In 1973, suspected Mossad operative Dan Ert was arrested in Norway, alleged to have helped assassinate Ahmed Bouchikhi, a waiter, mistaken for one of the terrorists who had killed eleven Israeli athletes at the 1972 Olympic games in Munich. Ert recounted the story whilst imprisoned as a way of proving to Norwegians that he was a Mossad operative. The story seemed more credible once it was found that Ert had been listed as president of the Liberian shipping company used to purchase Scheersberg A.

In 1977 the Plumbat Affair was leaked by Paul Leventhal, a former U.S. Senate staffer, at a disarmament conference, he said the stolen yellowcake shipment was enough to run a reactor such as Dimona for up to ten years.

Israeli officials at first were silent when enquiries were made, then issued a denial of all aspects of the story that related to Israel.

== Books based on the operation ==
A non-fiction book, The Plumbat Affair by Elaine Davenport, Paul Eddy and Peter Gillman, was published in 1978 by Futura Publications Ltd.

Operation Uranium Ship by Menachem Portugali, Dennis Eisenberg and Eli Landau was published in 1978 by Signet Books, and it provides details of the operation.

The 1979 book Triple by Ken Follett, also published by Signet, is a fictional recreation of the events.

== Sources ==
- Davenport, E., Eddy, P., & Gillman, P. (1978). The Plumbat Affair. Philadelphia: Lippincott. ISBN 978-0-397-01248-0
