= World Without End (Follett novel) =

Novel by Ken Follett

- Cover art of World Without End, UK edition (2007)
- Author: Ken Follett
- Language: English
- Genre: Historical fiction
- Published: 9 October 2007 (Penguin) (US edition)
- Publication place: United Kingdom
- Media type: Print (Hardback)
- Pages: 1024 (Paperback, US edition)
- ISBN: 0-525-95007-9 (Hardback, US edition)
- Preceded by: The Pillars of the Earth
- Followed by: A Column of Fire

World Without End is a best-selling 2007 historical fiction novel by Welsh author Ken Follett. It is the second book in the Kingsbridge Series, and is the sequel to 1989's The Pillars of the Earth.

World Without End takes place in the same fictional town as Pillars of the Earth – Kingsbridge – and features the descendants of some Pillars characters 157 years later. The plot incorporates two major historical events, the start of the Hundred Years' War and the Black Death. The author was inspired by real historical events relating to the Cathedral of Santa María in Vitoria-Gasteiz.

A television miniseries based on the novel aired worldwide in 2012. It premiered on Showcase in Canada on 4 September 2012; in the United States on Reelz Channel on 17 October 2012; on Channel 4 in the UK on 22 December, and on Star Movies in the Philippines in January 2013. The eight-part television event miniseries stars Cynthia Nixon, Miranda Richardson, Peter Firth, Ben Chaplin, Charlotte Riley, Sarah Gadon and Tom Weston-Jones. It was directed by Michael Caton-Jones who also directed the historical epic Rob Roy.

== Plot summary ==
The novel begins in the fictional city of Kingsbridge, England in the year 1327. Four children – Merthin, his brother Ralph, Caris, and Gwenda – head into the woods on All Hallows Day. Together the children witness two men-at-arms killed in self-defence by Sir Thomas Langley, aided by Ralph. The children then flee, with the exception of Merthin, who helps the wounded Sir Thomas bury a letter with instructions to dig up and deliver it if and when Sir Thomas should die. After this Sir Thomas flees to Kingsbridge and seeks refuge in the monastery, becoming a Benedictine monk, while the four children swear never to speak of what they saw.

During mass at All Hallows, Gwenda is forced by her father to steal the money that Sir Gerald was supposed to use to pay his debts to Kingsbridge Priory. Forced to default on these debts he is disgraced, his property confiscated and he and his wife are left as pensioners to the Priory. This disgrace drives their sons Merthin and Ralph to seek to regain the family's fortune and honour. Ralph is accepted as a squire under the Earl of Shiring, while Merthin is pushed to the far less prestigious role of apprenticing himself as a carpenter.

Ten years later, in 1337, Caris and Merthin are in love. When a section of the vault of the Kingsbridge Cathedral collapses Merthin, now an apprentice carpenter, shows his genius by developing a cheaper means of repair than his master.

Ralph, now a squire to Earl Roland of Shiring, provokes a fight and has his nose broken by a handsome peasant from Gwenda's village named Wulfric, for whom Gwenda has a hopeless infatuation. Gwenda is sold for a cow by her father to be prostituted at an outlaws' camp. She kills one of the outlaws while he is raping her, and escapes. She is followed by her buyer, but is able to drown him when the Kingsbridge bridge collapses, a tragedy that kills many, including all of Wulfric's immediate family and Prior Anthony of Kingsbridge. In the midst of the disaster Ralph saves Earl Roland's life and is rewarded with the lordship of Gwenda's village of Wigleigh.

Gwenda and Wulfric return to Wigleigh and attempt to gain Wulfric the inheritance of his father's land. The inheritance is eventually denied by Ralph because of the grudge he bears against Wulfric. Due to his poor prospects, Wulfric's beautiful wife-to-be, Annet, leaves him. By months of intensively showing Wulfric her love and devotion, Gwenda finally wins his love and they marry. Gwenda then tries to win Wulfric back his lands by having sex with Ralph, but Ralph does not uphold his end of the deal. Gwenda's first son, Sam, is conceived through this liaison.

Ralph, as lord, is merciless and brutal, and he winds up raping Annet as well. Wulfric does not permit this outrage to go unpunished, and lodges a complaint against Ralph with the Earl on her behalf; though English law of the time forbids rape regardless of the perpetrator's social status, it is very risky for peasants to sue their lord. Gwenda, despite her consternation at her husband's defence of his former sweetheart, helps by interceding with Lady Philippa about Ralph's case. Thanks to her intervention, Ralph is convicted of rape and is sentenced to hang, but with the Earl Roland's connivance, he manages to escape and becomes an outlaw. After robbing and murdering many people on the road to Kingsbridge, he is eventually captured with Merthin's help, and is once again set for execution, but since Edward III of England has declared war on France (launching the Hundred Years' War in May 1337) he is granted a royal pardon on condition that he fight in the war (in 1339, when Edward invades northeast France).

Meanwhile, the monastery's Sacrist, Godwyn, a nephew of Prior Anthony, outwits his opponents and wins the priory election in an overwhelming victory. Godwyn claims to be a reformer, but turns out to be even more conservative and quickly begins to clash with the townspeople on a number of issues, including the funding and building of a fabulous new bridge designed by Merthin and permitting the townspeople to full wool for a growing fabric industry. Caris, who becomes the de facto alderman, is a particular problem, leading the campaign to get for Kingsbridge the status of a Royal Borough and emancipate the townspeople from the Priory's control. Despite being her cousin, Godwyn charges Caris with witchcraft hoping to have her executed to get her out of the way. To escape execution, Caris agrees to join the Kingsbridge nunnery. With his planned marriage to Caris thus denied, Merthin leaves Kingsbridge for Florence, Italy to pursue his building career. He becomes a highly successful and rich architect, and after hearing that Caris had taken nun's vows he marries Silvia, the daughter of one of his Italian clients.

Eight years later (in 1346), Godwyn steals money from the substantially more profitable nuns in order to build for himself a luxurious palace. Meanwhile, a thief attempts to steal from the priory and Godwyn sentences him to death by flaying to set an example. In July 1346, Caris seeks to petition the bishop to redress Godwyn's theft. However, by this time the bishop has left for France with King Edward III. Caris travels to France with Mair, an attractive nun from the convent who has romantic feelings for Caris; during their travels they have an intimate encounter, although Caris feels guilty that she still cares more for Merthin. Along the way, Caris witnesses the ravages of the war and acts as a field nurse during the Battle of Crécy, during which Ralph, having fled charges of rape and murder in England, saves the life of the Prince of Wales and is rewarded with his lifelong dream of knighthood. Caris's errand is fruitless, however, as the bishop of Kingsbridge as well as Earl Roland have been killed in the battle.

In Florence, the city is ravaged by the Black Death, which had arrived in Messina in 1347. Merthin and his entire family are stricken, he recovers in the spring of 1348 but his wife dies. He remembers his love for Caris and decides to return to Kingsbridge with his daughter Laura (Lolla). There he finds Caris unwilling to renounce her vows but the two go through a sporadic liaison. At the same time, Merthin re-establishes himself in the community by solving flaws left in the new bridge during its completion after his departure.

Soon after Merthin's return, the plague reaches Kingsbridge and thousands die, and the city quickly descends into anarchy; among the dead is Sister Mair. Godwyn loses his nerve and flees with the monks to the remote priory of St John-in-the-Forest to escape the plague. There, he and all the monks die except for Gwenda's brother Philemon, who fled, and Thomas Langley.

After Mother Cecilia dies of the plague, Caris is elected Prioress. The new Bishop, Henri, arrives in Kingsbridge and promotes Caris as acting Prior in the absence of Godwyn. She institutes the use of masks and cleanliness which help to protect the nuns from the plague. With social morals loosened under the devastating effect of the plague, Caris regularly breaks her vows as a nun and for some time lives openly with Merthin. The townspeople, grateful for Caris' tireless efforts, tolerate this, as does the pragmatic Bishop who himself has a long-standing homosexual relationship with his archdeacon, which Caris is aware of but never disclosed.

Philemon returns to Kingsbridge and starts denouncing Caris, who must drop Merthin in order to continue her monastic and medical work. The disappointed Merthin angrily tells her he will not wait any more, but will find another love.

After William, the new Earl of Shiring, dies from the plague along with all his male heirs, Ralph sees a chance to become Earl. After murdering his young wife Matilda (Tilly), he arranges his marriage to William's widow Lady Phillipa, whom he has long desired, and makes himself Earl. However Philippa spurns him and leaves for the Kingsbridge nunnery, where she and Merthin fall in love in 1350 and she conceives his child. Afraid of Ralph's wrath, Philippa seduces Ralph to make him believe the child is his. As a result, Merthin and Philippa cannot continue their liaison.

After two years, the plague dissipates and Caris renounces her vows, after finally being able to run her own independent hospital, and marries Merthin. After ten years of hardship, the people of Kingsbridge are granted a borough charter, freeing them from the lordship of the priory, and Merthin becomes alderman. Merthin also solves the long troublesome problem of why the vault of the cathedral collapsed by dismantling and rebuilding one of the towers which he redesigns to be the tallest building in England. Although Ralph continues to harbour a grudge against Wulfric, he is forced by the labour shortages caused by the plague to allow Wulfric to regain his father's land. When Sam, the secret son of Ralph, kills the local bailiff's son and is sentenced to death, Gwenda reveals his true parentage to Ralph to gain Sam's release. Armed with this knowledge, Ralph blackmails Gwenda into having sex with him again. When Sam walks in on this, there is a struggle during which Sam and Gwenda kill Ralph. Davey, Gwenda's second son, negotiates a free tenancy and marries Amabel, the daughter of Wulfric's former wife-to-be Annet. Gwenda foresees a positive future for her grandchildren and feels that her struggles have been worth it.

Gwenda's conniving brother Philemon becomes Prior of Kingsbridge and even tries to become Bishop, but his ambition is thwarted after Sir Thomas Langley dies of old age. Merthin keeps his promise and digs up the letter which reveals that the deposed King Edward II had secretly survived and had taken the identity of one of his attackers and fled the country. Merthin trades the letter to a member of the king's court in exchange for Philemon's departure from Kingsbridge forever - promoting him as the English ambassador to the Avignon Papacy.

As the plague comes back, Caris's intelligence, practical sense and determination allow the townspeople to subdue this second outbreak, making her the most popular and revered figure in Kingsbridge. Merthin completes his spire and succeeds in making Kingsbridge cathedral the tallest building in England. He tops the spire with a statue of an angel modelled on Caris.

== Reception ==
World Without End soon after its release rapidly reached the top of The New York Times Best Seller list. and remained on the list for 30 weeks, and was a hit around the world.

Reviewer Bernard O'Keefe wrote: "The writings of Ken Follett and of Ayn Rand are different from each other in nearly every possible way. Follett is an outspoken champion of the Working Class and the British Labour Party, Rand idealized Capitalist "Robber Barons" and advocated the most extreme of Free market economics. Follett wrote spy thrillers and surprised readers and critics by turning to historical fiction and doing it well. Rand was a philosophical writer and her characters were meant to represent and embody abstract philosophical principles. Nevertheless, there are remarkable similarities of plot between Rand's The Fountainhead and Follet's World Without End. Rand's Howard Roark is a brilliant young architect who must wage a hard fight against hide-bound mediocre rivals before becoming established in 20th-century New York. Follet's Merthin is a brilliant young architect who must wage a hard fight with a hide-bound mediocre rival before becoming established in Medieval England. Roark's beloved Dominique spends many years married successively to two other men, and only on her second divorce can Roark marry her and live happily ever after. Merthin's beloved Caris spends many years as a cloistered nun, and only on her being released from her vows can Merthin marry her and live happily ever after. Rand's book ends with Roark and his bride standing on top of his greatest work – the highest skyscraper in all New York. Follet's book ends with Merthin and his bride standing on top of his greatest work – the tallest spire in all England."

== Historical references ==
- The reign of King Edward III provides the historical setting for the novel.
- The structural problems that force a rebuilding of the tower at Kingsbridge cathedral were modeled after an incident at the old cathedral of the Spanish town of Vitoria-Gasteiz (from the author's Acknowledgements).
- Merthin's target in his quest to build the tallest church spire in England was Salisbury Cathedral.
- The chapters taking place in France include accurate descriptions of the Battles of Blanchetaque and Crécy. Though the book has no French viewpoint characters, the plot device of Caris along with Sister Mair finding themselves inadvertently among the French soldiers, disguised as boys, makes it possible to describe the battles from both the English and the French points of view.
- Although all the action in England occurs in the fictional towns of Kingsbridge and Shiring, actual locales such as Melcombe (depicted as the main port used by the Kingsbridge merchants), Gloucester, Monmouth, Shaftesbury, Exeter, Winchester and Salisbury are in the same vicinity. This places the setting somewhere in south-central England.
- The Earls of Monmouth are often referenced as having many dealings (and at least two marriage alliances) with the Earls of Shiring. In historical fact, the title was only created in the 17th century and there were no such earls at the time in which World Without End is set.
- The mysterious buried letter, whose contents are revealed only near the end of the novel, is similar in many ways to the historical Fieschi Letter.

== The Kingsbridge Series ==
The Pillars of the Earth is the first novel of a series of five books by Follet. Two sequels were published: World Without End (2007) and A Column of Fire (2017). A prequel to Pillars, The Evening and the Morning was published in 2020. The final book in the series, The Armour of Light, was published in 2023.

== Television adaptation ==
A television adaptation, produced by Scott Free and Tandem Communications, adapted by John Pielmeier, and directed by Michael Caton-Jones was broadcast in the United Kingdom in 2013.
