= Code-Zero =

Code-Zero or variant, may refer to:

- Code-Zero, a Japanese-only Square-Enix videogame for the Sharp X68000, see List of Enix games#C
- Code 0 sail, a type of spinnaker
- Code 0 (Network Unreachable), a response code for IP in IP

== See also ==
- Code to Zero, novel
