= The Pillars of the Earth (miniseries) =

2010 television miniseries directed by Sergio Mimica-Gezzan

- Genre: Historical drama
- Based on: The Pillars of the Earth by Ken Follett
- Screenplay by: John Pielmeier
- Story by: Ken Follett
- Directed by: Sergio Mimica-Gezzan
- Starring: Ian McShane; Donald Sutherland; Matthew Macfadyen; Rufus Sewell; Eddie Redmayne; Hayley Atwell; David Oakes; Natalia Wörner; Robert Bathurst; Sarah Parish
- Theme music composer: Trevor Morris
- Countries of origin: Canada; Germany; Hungary
- Original language: English
- No. of episodes: 8

Production
- Executive producers: David A. Rosemont; Jonas Bauer; Tim Halkin; Michael Prupas; David W. Zucker; Rola Bauer; Tony Scott; Ridley Scott
- Producer: John Ryan
- Running time: 45 minutes
- Production companies: Tandem Communications; Muse Entertainment Enterprises; Scott Free
- Budget: $40 million

Original release
- Network: The Movie Network; Movie Central; Starz; Sat.1
- Release: 23 July – 27 August 2010

Related
- World Without End

The Pillars of the Earth is an eight-part 2010 television miniseries, adapted from Ken Follett's 1989 novel of the same name. It debuted in the U.S. on Starz and in Canada on The Movie Network/Movie Central on 23 July 2010. Its UK premiere was on Channel 4 in October 2010. The series was nominated for three awards at the 68th Golden Globe Awards, including Best Miniseries or Television Film, while Ian McShane and Hayley Atwell received acting nominations.

== Overview ==
Like the novel on which it is based, the miniseries centres on the construction of a cathedral in the fictional town of Kingsbridge during a tumultuous period of English history known as The Anarchy in the 12th century.

== Differences from the novel ==
A number of character changes were made for the series. For example, Waleran is older and Remigius is younger in the series than the novel. Similarly, the actors playing Alfred, Jack, Richard, and Aliena are initially older than those portrayed in the novel. Also, the characters of Henry of Blois, Andrew Sacrist, Milius the kitchener, and Thomas Becket are not introduced in the series. The incestuous fixation of Regan on her son William is not present in the novel. The story of young Philip and Francis's rescue by Abbot Peter after the death of their parents during a war in Wales is omitted and Prior James is said to be the one who brought the boy Philip to the priory. Further, the thief character who attacks Martha and steals their pig is merged to become the monk Johnny Eightpence. Jack and Aliena only have one child in the series.

Character events were also modified on occasion. Shareburg, Ellen's lover and the father of Jack, is not hanged but burnt at the stake, and does not sing the minstrel song seen in the novel. In the TV series, Ellen is not pregnant at that time (but holds a baby) and does not use a cockerel during her curse. The romantic tryst between Ellen and Tom in the woods after the death of Agnes as per the novel does not occur, rather they become closer after Ellen states that Jack needs a master builder to whom to apprentice. Similarly, Alfred is also not seen physically bullying Martha or Jack in the series. The execution scene of Bartholomew (and Aliena's appeal to Stephen for mercy, and Stephen's offer of a knighthood to Richard) in episode 3 does not occur in the novel, where he simply languishes and dies alone in prison. Also, Jack does not duel Walter for the rights to the quarry as shown in episode 3, nor have his hand broken. In the novel, Percy Hamleigh dies of unknown causes, whereas in episode 4, he is bled to death by his ambitious wife Regan. The poisoning of Jack in episode 6 was added by the series.

Several plot changes also happened. For example, the body of the saint in the burning church is not saved as per the novel, but the body-less skull is lost in the inferno. Also, in the series, Tom tells Jack to sculpt a stone statue of St. Adolphus. In the novel Henry of Blois (and not Stephen) visits the cathedral work-site, and in episode 4, it is Jack (and not Richard as per the novel) who accompanies Philip to Lincoln. Episode 5's lake scene where Aliena swims and later rescues Alfred from drowning is not seen in the novel. The tales of Jack and Aliena travelling in Spain are not shown in episode 7. Further, rather than being given a weeping statue in Toledo as detailed in the novel, Jack carves one himself from wood and a rejected stone from St. Denis. Philip's loss of the priorship to Remegius, Cuthbert's assassination attempt on Jack, and William murdering Regan are also creations seen in episode 7 of the series.

=== Episode 8 ===
The ending of the series is completely different from the novel.

In the novel, William becomes Sheriff when he is old. He then tries to arrest Richard for murdering Alfred. Richard then claims sanctuary in the cathedral and then decides to leave on a crusade, and Aliena takes over the Earldom. Waleran becomes disgraced for his part in the murder of Thomas Becket and tells Jack who his father was. William hangs for his part in the murder of Becket. Jonathan becomes Prior of Kingsbridge and Philip becomes Bishop.

In the series, William becomes Sheriff almost immediately after he loses the Earldom. Waleran makes Alfred cut himself with a knife and blame it on Jack to get him arrested. Unknown to Alfred, the knife was poisoned so that Jack could be charged for murder. William then successfully arrests Jack, and is put on a public trial. Waleran leads the trial, ultimately charging Jack guilty of murder and sentences him to hang. However, just in time, Jack's mother arrives at the trial, and talks about how Waleran was the man in charge of setting Jack's father up for murder. She then reveals that she has gotten hold of the letter that Jack's father was about to send to the King, and that it told how Jack's father saw Waleran and the Hamleighs being present on the White Ship and murdering the young prince and his wife before sailing away safely. Extremely frustrated, William tries to attack Aliena, but is held back by the crowd. Jack's mother unties the noose from Jack's neck and the crowd put William Hamleigh there instead, where he is then hanged. Meanwhile, Waleran escapes and tries to run away, but the crowd corners him into the cathedral. Trying in vain to escape via the roof, Waleran falls off the cathedral and dies. Philip remains Prior of Kingsbridge.

== Cast ==
- Ian McShane as Waleran Bigod, Bishop of Kingsbridge, later Cardinal and Bishop of Kingsbridge
- Rufus Sewell as Tom Builder, 1st Head Builder of the Kingsbridge Cathedral
- Matthew Macfadyen as Prior Philip, Prior of Kingsbridge Priory and Cathedral Church and later Philip, Bishop of Kingsbridge
- Eddie Redmayne as Jack Jackson, 3rd Head Builder of the Kingsbridge Cathedral
- Hayley Atwell as Lady Aliena, daughter to Earl Bartholomew, merchant of Kingsbridge
- Sarah Parish as Regan Hamleigh
- Natalia Wörner as Ellen, a former nun, dissident, and Jack Jackson's mother
- Anatole Taubman as Remigius, Sub-Prior of Kingsbridge
- John Pielmeier as Cuthbert, a Brother in the Kingsbridge Priory
- Robert Bathurst as Percy Hamleigh
- Clive Wood as King Henry I
- Sam Claflin as Richard, Earl of Shiring
- Liam Garrigan as Alfred, 2nd Head Builder of the Cathedral
- David Oakes as William Hamleigh, sometime Earl of Shiring
- Götz Otto as Walter, William's valet and henchman
- Tony Curran as King Stephen, King of England
- Donald Sutherland as Bartholomew, Earl of Shiring, supporter of Empress Maud
- Alison Pill as Empress Maude, Queen of England and Dowager Holy Roman Empress
- Gordon Pinsent as Archbishop of Canterbury

=== Additional cast ===
In alphabetical order

- Féodor Atkine as Abbot Suger
- David Bark-Jones as Francis
- Skye Bennett as Martha young
- Freddie Boath as Henry 15 years old
- Douglas Booth as Eustace 15 years old
- Matt Devere as Gloucester
- Kate Dickie as Agnes
- Ken Follett as Merchant
- Jody Halse as Johnny Eightpence
- Emily Holt as Martha older
- Sidney Johnston as Jonathan 4–5 years old
- Skye Lourie as Elizabeth
- Michael A. Mehlmann as Prior James
- Mark Phelan as Otto
- Tibor Pintér as Shareburg
- Kevin Rees as Jonathan 30 years old
- Brooke Dean as Maud - 6 years old

== Production ==
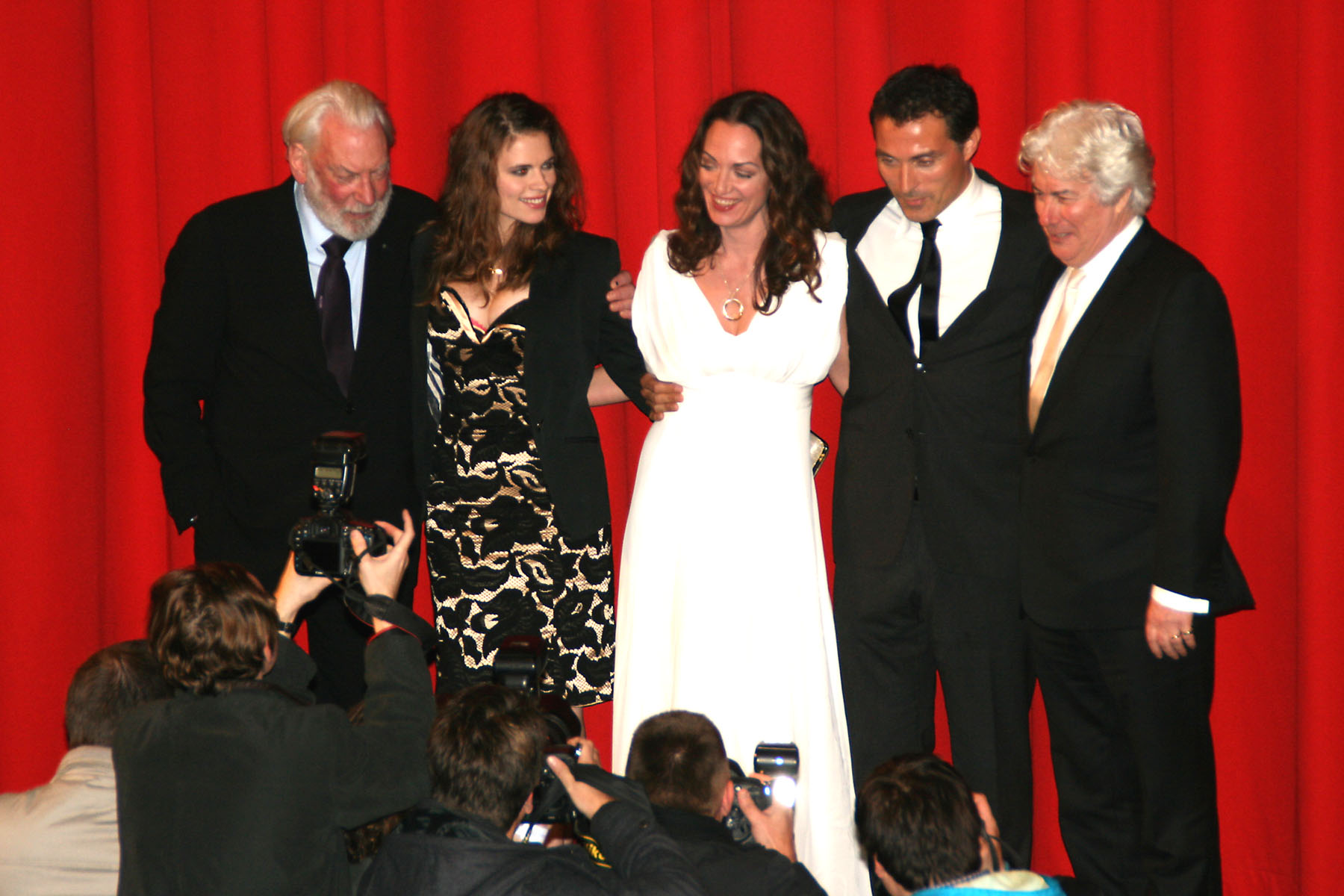
Donald Sutherland, Hayley Atwell, Natalia Wörner, Rufus Sewell and Ken Follett

The miniseries took about a year to produce, at a cost of US$40 million. The project was funded by the German production company Tandem Communications, the Canadian film company Muse Entertainment Enterprises, and the UK and U.S. based Scott Free Productions. It was filmed in Austria and Hungary in 2009. The final aerial shot is of modern-day Salisbury with a CGI cathedral combining elements of Salisbury Cathedral and Wells Cathedral, to represent the complete fictional Kingsbridge Cathedral, which were the two cathedrals which inspired Follett during the writing of the novel. The series was followed by an adaptation of the sequel World Without End in 2012.

=== Historical accuracy ===
Several historical timelines of The Anarchy were modified or invented for the series, and in the view of one reviewer "great liberties are taken with the actual history". For example, the birth of Henry II and the death of his grandfather Henry I timelines are shortened in episode 1, given that young Henry was born in March 1133, and the older Henry died in December 1135. Further, geographically, Henry II was living in Maine when Henry I fell ill in Normandy while hunting. Similarly in episode 4, both King Stephen and Robert of Gloucester are captured at the Battle of Lincoln. While it is accurate that Stephen was captured in Lincoln in early February 1141 (and later imprisoned in Bristol), Gloucester was not captured until more than seven months later in the Rout of Winchester in mid-September.

Similarly, other historical characters were given premature deaths. For example, the nameless Archbishop of Canterbury seen in episodes 1-6 (historically Theobald of Bec) was not murdered, but served throughout the period of The Anarchy from 1138 to 1161, and he died after a long illness. Similarly Maud's illegitimate half-brother, Robert of Gloucester, did not die nor was beheaded on the battlefield as shown in episode 7. Rather he died in 1147 at Bristol Castle, where he had previously imprisoned King Stephen. Finally, while Eustace does precede his father Stephen in death, it was not at the hands of his cousin Henry in battle as shown in episode 8, but probably due to a fit or seizure.

== Broadcast ==
The premiere was simulcast on both Starz and Encore. On Starz 423,000 people watched, and on Encore 267,000 people watched, for a total of 690,000 total viewers. In the Starz broadcast, episodes 1 and 2, as a series premiere, and episodes 7 and 8, as a series finale, were broadcast together as a single episode. In the 2011 broadcast by the Canadian Broadcasting Corporation, the series was re-cut into nine episodes. In December 2012, the series was shown in Australia by the Australian Broadcasting Corporation in four parts at weekly intervals, combining pairs of episodes each with a single introduction.

== Episodes ==
No.	Title	Directed by	Written by	Original release date	US viewers (millions)
1	"Anarchy"	Sergio Mimica-Gezzan	John Pielmeier	23 July 2010	0.690
The succession to the crown of England is left in doubt after the heir apparent to the throne dies in the White Ship disaster in 1120. Eighteen years later, in 1138, this lack of heir causes Henry I's daughter, Maud, and nephew, Stephen, to compete for the throne. Church politics see Philip, a monk, elected as the new prior of Kingsbridge, which leaves him indebted to Archdeacon, and soon to be Bishop, Waleran. Lady Aliena of Shiring rejects the marriage proposal of William Hamleigh, and Tom Builder and his family are left destitute when William Hamleigh dismisses them from building his house. While in the forest, they meet Ellen and Jack, a mother and son living free in the woods. After the death of Tom's wife, Agnes, in childbirth, and the abandoning of the newborn, the group end up at Shiring Castle just as it is attacked by the ever ambitious Hamleighs.
2	"Master Builder"	Sergio Mimica-Gezzan	John Pielmeier	23 July 2010	0.690
Tom, Ellen, and the children make their way to Kingsbridge Priory and encounter Tom's abandoned baby taken in by the monks. A fire started by Jack destroys Kingsbridge church and its holy relic, giving Tom, his son Alfred, and stepson Jack the chance to settle down and build a new cathedral. Prior Philip learns the power of politics when he gets caught between Bishop Waleran and the Hamleighs' machinations for Shiring Castle. Kingsbridge is rocked by Alfred's accusation of Ellen being a witch, and a trial that Waleran personally oversees. William and his underling, Walter, ambush Aliena and Richard in a brutal attack at Shiring that leaves both siblings scarred. William forces himself on Aliena and, as he rips off her dress, rapes her. Aliena makes a life-long promise to her father, Earl Bartholomew to regain the family honour, and Ellen makes a daring escape.
3	"Redemption"	Sergio Mimica-Gezzan	John Pielmeier	30 July 2010	0.298
In Winchester, Aliena fears that she is pregnant with William's child. They appeal to the king for clemency for her father, but Bartholomew is beheaded publicly anyway, and Richard is offered a knighthood. Aliena then starts a fleece middleman business to help earn money for Richard's expenses. Tom, Philip and William find themselves in a standoff over access to the Shiring quarry, and Jack is injured in a duel with Walter. Waleran and Regan plot to have the cathedral moved from Kingsbridge to Shiring, and invite the king to Kingsbridge to observe the feast day of St. Adolphus. Despite his injury, Jack's artistic talents take hold as he carves and paints a statue to honour the cathedral's patron saint. After Philip recruits peasants to assist with building, King Stephen visits the cathedral work site but collapses in a nightmare-induced fit before the statue. Aliena is not pregnant with William's child, causing her great relief.
4	"Battlefield"	Sergio Mimica-Gezzan	John Pielmeier	6 August 2010	0.361
In 1141, in Shiring, Regan hastens her husband's death for the sake of her son, and arranges to have Waleran absolve William of all past and future sins. Meanwhile, Maud is besieged at Lincoln Castle, and it is unclear when Robert of Gloucester can come to her aid. King Stephen holds court in Winchester, and William applies to have his father's title transferred to him, only to learn that Richard, now a battle-hardened knight, is also a claimant. Aliena, now a wealthy merchant, is in town to support her brother. Later, Philip travels to Lincoln to reclaim quarry rights - but Stephen is frightened by Jack's appearance and orders his death. The battle between Stephen and Gloucester sees each side's leader being taken hostage. The Hamleighs and Waleran switch allegiance, and Philip is tortured under Waleran's orders.
5	"Legacy"	Sergio Mimica-Gezzan	John Pielmeier	13 August 2010	0.364
Philip is rescued by his brother Francis, and finds Jack "risen from the dead". Waleran and Regan manipulate the prisoner exchange so that they remain on the winning side of the war, and Waleran helps Gloucester by suggesting a replacement for the king's son, Eustace. The Hamleighs and Philip are offered terms by Maud to Shiring's estate and resources, but at a steep price. Tom wants Jack and Alfred to be friends, but Alfred's jealousy over Jack and inheriting his father's tools is too intense, and he smashes all of Jack's gargoyles. To resolve the tension, Jack is offered an assistant and overseer position by Philip, on the condition that he takes the vows of a monk - he accepts the deal against Ellen's wishes. Meanwhile, William is encouraged by Waleran to attack Kingsbridge and stop the fleece fair. In the ensuing chaos and inferno, Aliena is burnt and Tom is murdered by William.
6	"Witchcraft"	Sergio Mimica-Gezzan	John Pielmeier	20 August 2010	0.432
The dead from William's raid are buried, and Richard returns from war to find his sister penniless and unable to support his knighthood. Alfred offers himself to Prior Philip as master builder, and also to Richard as sponsor, and Aliena has to choose between her feelings for Jack and her oath to her father. Both Alfred and William marry, although both brides are soon victims of cruelty. Ellen, having cursed the marriage, helps Jack escape the priory, and he leaves for France. Regan murders the Archbishop, and eight months later, forces Waleran to intercede about William's long-delayed earldom. The ceiling disaster at Kingsbridge becomes a way for Waleran to replace Philip. In the rubble, Aliena gives birth to Jack's son and is thrown out by Alfred, but Ellen encourages her to seek her lover. Meanwhile, Jack admires the revolutionary Gothic work being done at the Basilica of St Denis.
7	"New Beginnings"	Sergio Mimica-Gezzan	John Pielmeier	27 August 2010	0.607
It is 1146, and after his time in St. Denis, Jack learns how to fulfil Tom's dream of a high cathedral filled with light. Aliena successfully tracks Jack in France and the two reunite. As they return, they arrive in Cherbourg where he learns of his father (with author Ken Follett in a cameo role) and meets his family. Meanwhile, Waleran offers Philip the archdeacon position but he declines it due to Waleran's ambitions. In battle, Richard slays Gloucester, pleasing the king, who can only repay him by asking that he to go on crusade. With the arrival of Jack's weeping statue, Kingsbridge becomes prosperous again, infuriating Regan and William, who plan another attack. Tipped off by Elizabeth, however, Philip is able to rally resistance from the townsfolk who unite to build a town wall. Philip regains control after Cuthbert dies in a failed attempt on Jack's life, and William tires of his mother's insatiable control over him.
8	"The Work of Angels"	Sergio Mimica-Gezzan	John Pielmeier	27 August 2010	0.607
Ten years later, in 1156, Richard returns from crusade seeking again his title, which is finally granted to him by Eustace. With the support of Elizabeth and Aliena, he is able to reclaim Shiring Castle after a duel with Walter. Meanwhile, Jack's fixation with the cathedral and the appearance of cracks in its roof leads to tension with Aliena. Waleran's continued scheming leads to the death of Alfred and the arrest of Jack by the newly appointed Sheriff, William. Stephen's hopes are shattered with the death of his son in battle. At Jack's trial, Ellen produces Shareburg's letter, and Martha produces his ring, as evidence of Waleran's complicity in the murder of Prince William on the White Ship. In the chaos of the trial, both William and Waleran die, and Jack and Aliena finally marry. Fourteen years later, in 1170, the cathedral and its glass windows are finally finished.

== Reception ==
The review aggregation website Rotten Tomatoes gave the series a 77% approval rating based on 30 reviews, with an average rating of 5.92/10. The site's critical consensus reads: "With its talented cast and strong production values, Pillars of the Earth is the kind of satisfying, eventful miniseries that is rarely seen these days."

== Awards and nominations ==
Year	Association	Category	Recipient(s)	Result	Ref.
2011	Primetime Emmy Awards	Outstanding Sound Editing for a Miniseries, Movie, or Special for the episode "The Work of Angels"	Marcel Pothier; Christian Rivest; Dominik Pagacz; Guy Pelletier; Antoine Morin; Tom Trafalski; Guy Francoeur	Won	
2011	Gemini Awards	Outstanding Sound for a Miniseries, Movie or a Special for (one Hour) for the episode "The Work of Angels"	Marcel Pothier; Christian Rivest; Dominik Pagacz; Guy Pelletier; Antoine Morin; Tom Trafalski; Guy Francoeur	Won	

== See also ==
- Ken Follett's The Pillars of the Earth (video game)
- List of historical drama films
