= A Column of Fire =

2017 novel by Ken Follett

- Cover art of A Column of Fire, UK edition (2017)
- Author: Ken Follett
- Language: English
- Series: Kingsbridge
- Genre: Historical fiction
- Published: 2017 (Viking Press) (UK edition)
- Publication place: United Kingdom
- Media type: Print (Hardback)
- Pages: 768
- ISBN: 978-1-4472-7873-3 (UK Hardcover)
- Preceded by: World Without End
- Followed by: The Armour of Light

A Column of Fire is a 2017 novel by British author Ken Follett, first published on 12 September 2017. It is the third book in the Kingsbridge Series, and serves as a sequel to 1989's The Pillars of the Earth and 2007's World Without End.

== Plot ==
Beginning in 1558, and continuing through 1605, the story chronicles the romance between Ned Willard and Margery Fitzgerald, as well as the political intrigue of the royal courts of England, France, and Scotland, and the oft-times violent conflict between supporters of the nascent Protestant Reformation and those supporting the Catholic Church’s Counter-Reformation in the late 16th century.

As depicted in the early chapters, the city of Kingsbridge is ruled by an oligarchy of rich merchants who sit on the city's council; the most powerful family holds the position of the city's mayor. The plot focuses on three families; each represents a major ideological division present in English society at the time. The Fitzgeralds are a staunchly Catholic family, which under the Catholic Queen Mary gives them an advantage over the others and the position of Mayor. They seek to upgrade their social position by a marrying into the titled aristocracy. At the opposite pole are the intransigently Puritan Cobleys, who secretly hold Protestant worship - a highly dangerous act under Catholic rule. Their strong religious principles do not, however, stop the Cobleys from resorting to occasional underhand tricks to cheat their competitors and employees, and dabbling in the new lucrative field of the Transatlantic Slave Trade. In between are the more pragmatic Willards - nominal Catholics under Mary, but who would turn Protestant once Elizabeth came to power.

In the book's early part, the dominant Fitzgeralds make use of their alliance with the ruthless Catholic Bishop Julius to hit at their rivals. They get Philbert Cobley burned as a heretic for conducting a Protestant service and drive the Willards virtually bankrupt by strictly enforcing anti-usury laws which are usually regarded as a legal fiction (since in fact all merchants take interest on loans). This forces Ned Willard to take service with Princess (later Queen) Elizabeth, rather than pursuing his family's traditional commercial activities - eventually ending up as the Queen's spymaster. Later on, with the Protestants gaining ascendancy, they take revenge on the Fitzgeralds, making their commercial activity dependent on renouncing the Catholic faith - thereby driving Rollo Fitzgerald out of business and into becoming an exile Catholic Priest and a mastermind of Catholic plots against Queen Elizabeth with pseudonym Jean Langlais.

With these two major viewpoint characters thrown out of Kingsbridge and into the wider scene, the book's focus changes. Unlike the two previous novels in this series, a large portion of the plot takes place outside the town of Kingsbridge, utilizing such far-flung settings as London, Paris, Seville, Geneva, Antwerp, Scotland and the Caribbean, and involving many major characters who have no direct connection with the town. In the later part of the book, Ned Willard's nephew Alfonso restores the Willard family fortunes by conducting projects designed by his grand-mother and becomes the new Mayor like his grand-father. However, to the end of the book the local affairs of Kingsbridge remain secondary to the greater political and religious struggles.

The later parts of the book focus on the deadly battle of wits between Catholic conspirator Rollo Fitzgerald, hatching sophisticated dangerous conspiracies, and Ned Willard, the Royal spymaster tasked with uncovering and foiling these conspiracies. In many ways this echoes, under 16th Century conditions, the themes of Follet's WWII spy thriller Eye of the Needle - which featured a similar struggle between German spy Henry Faber ("Die Nadel") and MI5 spy catcher Percival Godliman.

== Historical events ==
The plot includes extensive depictions of several important historical events of the late 16th and early 17th centuries. Follett in general follows known historical facts, but altering them to the extent necessary for his fictional characters to play a significant role:

- The death of King Henry II of France in a jousting accident - a traumatic event setting the stage for the decades-long French Wars of Religion.
- The Massacre of Wassy on 1 March 1562, the first major event of those wars.
- The escape of Mary, Queen of Scots, from imprisonment at Lochleven Castle (1568), described in great detail from the point of view of the fictional Alison McKay, to whom Follett attributed the part of various actual ladies in waiting and servants of Queen Mary. Alison McKay is depicted as afterwards strongly but vainly urging Mary not to take the decision to go to England - a fatal mistake which led to a much longer imprisonment which the loyal Alison shared up to the moment of Mary's execution.
- St. Bartholomew's Day massacre (1572) in which Catholic mobs massacred thousands of Protestants in Paris. Conflicting interpretations of this catastrophic event were current at the time and are still debated among modern historians - some regarding the massacre as the unplanned culmination of escalating religious tensions, while others attributed it to a deliberate Machiavellian planning. In the latter case, the blame for planning the massacre is variously attributed to the Guise Family, leaders of the fanatic Catholic League, to King Charles IX and his mother Catherine de Medici, or to both. Follett's account attributes to the book's main villain, Pierre Aumande - an intelligent, capable, and utterly ruthless man - the main responsibility for planning and initiating the massacre. He is depicted as manipulating the Guise Family, the King and his mother and the Mayor of Paris, getting the Paris militia mobilized on false pretexts and then made to start killing Protestants and making deadly use of meticulous lists of the names and addresses of Paris Protestants, which Aumande had compiled through previous years of systematic espionage. In all that, Aumande is shown as being motivated mainly by opportunism, seeking to bolster his position as the Guise Family's main adviser, and he also makes of use of the general massacre to sadistically settle some personal accounts. The protagonist Ned Willard and Sylvie, the French Protestant woman he loves, get only a belated warning of the impending massacre and are able to warn in time only a few of the threatened Protestants - at considerable risk to their own lives.
- The Babington Plot (1587) in which Queen Elizabeth I's agents got hold of secret correspondence in which Mary, Queen of Scots explicitly assented to the conspirators' plan to kill the Protestant Queen Elizabeth and place the Catholic Mary on the throne - the evidence which led to Mary being executed for treason. Follett attributes to Ned Willard - working in the Queen's Secret Service as Francis Walsingham's deputy - the credit for having painstakingly uncovered the plot and intimidated Gilbert Gifford into becoming a double agent and delivering to the Queen's agents the letters sent to and by Mary. In actuality, Gifford was recruited by Walsingham himself.
- Drake's raid on Cadiz in 1587 - emphasizing that as well as delaying the sailing of the Spanish Armada, the English raiders were motivated by seeking to loot Spanish ships (including Follet's viewpoint character, the sea captain Barney Willard).
- The Spanish Armada (1588), by which King Philip II of Spain sought to conquer England. Follett attributes to Ned Willard two important contributions to the English victory. First, years earlier, Ned talks to his brother Barney, a seasoned English sailor whose ship had done well in a sea battle with a Spanish galleon off Hispaniola. Based on that experience, Barney believes that England should not seek to build galleons of its own, but rather create a navy composed of "smaller, more agile ships, which could dance around a galleon and rake it with cannon fire". Ned conveys this advice to the Queen, who acts on it - and builds the ships which would eventually defeat the Armada. Closer to the events, Ned Willard goes on a dangerous spying mission from Antwerp to Calais, to assess the Spanish strength. From his merchant cousin, based in Antwerp, Willard hears of the Hellburners, fireships employed against the Spanish during the recent Siege of Antwerp. On this basis, Willard advises the English commanders to load the cannons of the fireships sent into the port of Calais, so that even with no human crews they would start firing when the fire gets to them. This turns out to be very crucial, as otherwise the Spanish might have been able to tow the English fireships to burn harmlessly in the open sea. Without the fireships causing the Spanish ships to scatter and break formation, the outcome of the entire battle might have been different. As depicted in the story, neither Ned nor anyone else is aware of the crucial role his advice had in the English victory. Only the omniscient writer conveys it to the reader by shifting back and forth between the English and the Spanish points of view. In his depiction of the Armada, Follett clearly strives to be fair to both sides, several times emphasizing that both the English and the Spanish had courageous fighters and skilled sailors.
- The Gunpowder Plot (1605), in which Catholic conspirators sought to blow up the English Parliament and kill in one blow the recently enthroned King James I, his sons Henry and Charles and all his principal ministers and advisers, and to use the resulting power vacuum to seize power. Follett attributes to the book's antagonist, the staunch Catholic Rollo Fitzgerald, the role of initiating the plot and recruiting Guy Fawkes to implement it. To Ned Willard is attributed the role of uncovering the conspiracy and averting it at the last moment. For dramatic purposes, Follett omits the historical fact that the gunpowder had undergone some deterioration and might not have exploded. As depicted in the book, it was completely combustible and the plot might well have been carried out, with drastic results for later English history, but for Willard discovering it in the very nick of time.

== Characters ==
Point-of-View Characters

- Ned Willard - The younger son of a prosperous Kingsbridge merchant family, a tolerant Protestant who desires no man should die for his faith.
- Margery Fitzgerald - Daughter of the mayor of Kingsbridge, a Catholic with loyalties torn between her religion and her love for Ned Willard, with whom she shares common ideals.
- Rollo Fitzgerald - Margery's elder brother, a hard-line Catholic. A relentless bully who views his family honor as more important than its individual members.
- Pierre Aumande - An ambitious but low-born French Catholic con man. As the story moves forward, he is revealed to be progressively more sadistic and black-hearted.
- Sylvie Palot - Daughter of a Parisian printer and bookseller, a zealous but tolerant Protestant. Full of courage, and a desire to change the world, she puts herself willingly in danger for the sake of her faith and her ideals.
- Alison McKay - Lady-in-waiting and close childhood friend to Mary, Queen of Scots, a Catholic. Described as beautiful, and loyal to a fault, there is little she will not do for Mary's sake.
- Barney Willard - Ned's elder brother, a merchant living with relatives in Spain, a tolerant Catholic. A devil-may-care, enterprising rogue, he lives for the thrill of adventure, the company of beautiful women, and the life of the sailor.
- Ebrima Dabo - An enslaved West African man, in bondage to the Willards' Spanish relations, a nominal Catholic who secretly follows traditional Mandinka beliefs.

Prominently Featured Historical Figures

- Mary Tudor, Queen of England - Elder half-sister of Elizabeth I, a hard-line Catholic (mentioned, but does not appear).
- Philip II of Spain, King of Spain and King of England de jure uxoris - Husband of Mary Tudor, a hard-line Catholic (mentioned, but does not appear).
- Elizabeth Tudor, Queen of England - Called Elizabeth I, a tolerant Protestant.
- Tom Parry - Treasurer to Queen Elizabeth I.
- Sir William Cecil - Advisor to Queen Elizabeth I.
- François, Duke of Guise - Called Scarface, a celebrated French general, father of Henri I of Guise and uncle of Mary, Queen of Scots, a hard-line Catholic.
- Charles, Cardinal of Lorraine - Spymaster, younger brother of Scarface and uncle of Mary, Queen of Scots, a hard-line Catholic.
- Mary Stuart, Queen of Scotland - A Catholic, briefly Queen Consort of France, niece of Scarface and Cardinal Charles, called Mary, Queen of Scots.
- Francis II, King of France - Son of Henri II of France and Catherine de' Medici, first husband of Mary, Queen of Scots, a hard-line Catholic.
- Catherine de' Medici - Queen Consort of France and Queen Regent during the reign of her son Charles, wife of Henri II, mother of Francis II, Charles IX, and Henri III, a tolerant Catholic.
- Sir Francis Walsingham - Secretary and spymaster to Queen Elizabeth I.
- Sir Francis Throckmorton - Conspirator against Queen Elizabeth I.
- Sir Francis Drake - English fleet commander.
- Henri, Duke of Guise - Leader of the French Catholic League, son of Scarface.
- Charles IX, King of France - Son of Henri II of France and Catherine de' Medici, younger brother of Francis II.
- Gaspard de Coligny - Admiral of France and Protestant leader, advisor of Charles IX.
- Henri III, King of France - Son of Henri II of France and Catherine de' Medici, younger brother of Francis II and Charles IX.
- Princess Margot, Princess of France - Daughter of Henri II of France and Catherine de' Medici, lover of Henri I, Duke of Guise, married to Henry of Navarre.
- Henry of Navarre, Heir of Navarre Kingdom - Protestant, married to Princess Margot to deal peace between Catholics and Protestants.
- Robert Cecil, Earl of Salisbury - Son of William, advisor and Secretary of State to Queen Elizabeth and King James.
- James VI and I, King of Scotland, and later, of England - Son of Mary, Queen of Scots and Lord Darnley.
- Guy Fawkes - A Catholic conspirator in the Gunpowder Plot.
- Thomas Percy - A Catholic conspirator in the Gunpowder Plot.

Other Major Characters

- Alice Willard - Mother of Ned and Barney, widow of the former mayor of Kingsbridge, a prosperous Kingsbridge merchant and tolerant Protestant.
- Sir Reginald Fitzgerald - Father of Margery and Rollo, mayor of Kingsbridge, a vindictive Catholic.
- Bart Shiring - Son of the Earl of Shiring, rival suitor for Margery's hand.
- Swithin, Earl of Shiring - Father of Bart.
- Bishop Julius of Kingsbridge - A hard-line Catholic who want buy to Sir Reginald Fitzgerald the Kingsbridge priory.
- Philbert Cobley - A strict Protestant merchant of Kingsbridge who hold secret and forbidden Protestant worship.
- Dan Cobley - Son of Philbert, a strict Protestant merchant of Kingsbridge.
- Isabelle Palot - Mother of Sylvie, a Protestant.
- Louise, Marchioness de Nîmes - A Protestant aristocrat, member of Sylvie's congregation.
- Carlos Cruz - A merchant from Seville, cousin of the Willards, a tolerant Catholic.
- Odette - Maidservant to Veronique de Guise, later wife of Pierre Aumande.
- Nath - Maidservant working for Pierre Aumande, a Protestant.
- Alain de Guise - Stepson of Pierre Aumande, a Protestant.
- Bella - A mixed-race enterprising rum distiller on the Caribbean island of Hispaniola.
- Alfonso Willard - Bella's son by Barney Willard, eventually taken to England and becoming Mayor of Kingsbridge.

Other Characters with spoilers

- Bartlet Shiring - First son of Margery and officially Bart Shiring (in fact Swithin), Earl of Shiring after Bart.
- Roger - Second son of Margery and officially Bart Shiring (in fact son of Ned), deputy of Kingsbridge and member of King privy council after Ned.
- Donal Gloster - Former Philbert Cobley's employee who tries to seduce Ruth Cobley, Philbert Cobley's daughter. His failure made him alcoholic and manipulable.
- Jonas Bacon - Captain of the Hawk, seized vessel in Calais by French which ruined Sir Reginald Fitzgerald then Alice Willard

== Similarity with Winter of the World ==
A Column of Fire shares a major plot element with Follet's Winter of the World. Though set in respectively the 16th Century and the 20th, both novels have a rich commoner woman (Margery Fitzgerald in the one book, Daisy Peshkov in the other) marrying the scion of a titled English aristocratic family. In both books, the character finds herself trapped in a loveless and unhappy marriage, overshadowed by her husband's powerful autocratic father, and must try to make the best of it; starts a secret affair with a man she truly loves; and is able, after many tribulations, to escape the unhappy aristocratic marriage and happily marry her true love.

== Reception ==
Bill Sheehan of The Washington Post summarizes the book by commenting: "Like its predecessors in the Kingsbridge series, “A Column of Fire” is absorbing, painlessly educational and a great deal of fun. Follett uses the tools of popular fiction to great effect in these books, illuminating a nation’s gradual progress toward modernity. The central theme of this latest book — the ongoing conflict between tolerance and fanaticism — lends both relevance and resonance to the slowly unfolding story of England’s past."

== Musical adaptation ==
In 2019, a musical adaptation of A Column of Fire had its world premiere 1 March, 2019, at Bellevue Teatret in Klampenborg, Denmark. The musical was written by Thomas Høg, Lasse Aagaard, and Sune Svanekier, who had previously adapted The Pillars of the Earth into a musical at Østre Gasværk Teater in 2016.
