= A Place Called Freedom =

Novel by Ken Follet

- First edition
- Author: Ken Follett
- Language: English
- Genre: Historical Fiction
- Publisher: Pan Macmillan
- Publication date: 1995
- Publication place: United Kingdom
- Media type: Print (hardcover, paperback)
- Pages: 567 pp (paperback)
- ISBN: 0-330-34483-8
- OCLC: 43183527

A Place Called Freedom is a work of historical fiction by Ken Follett. Set in 1767, it follows the adventures of an idealistic young coal miner from Scotland who believes there must be more to life than working down the pit. The miner, Malachi (Mack) McAsh, eventually runs away in order to find work and a new life in London. Eventually McAsh becomes a leader amongst the working classes of the city and becomes a target for those vested interest groups who do not share his point of view. McAsh is framed for a crime he did not commit and sent to serve seven years hard labour in the Colony of Virginia where he is forced to find a new life.

== Historical events from the novel ==
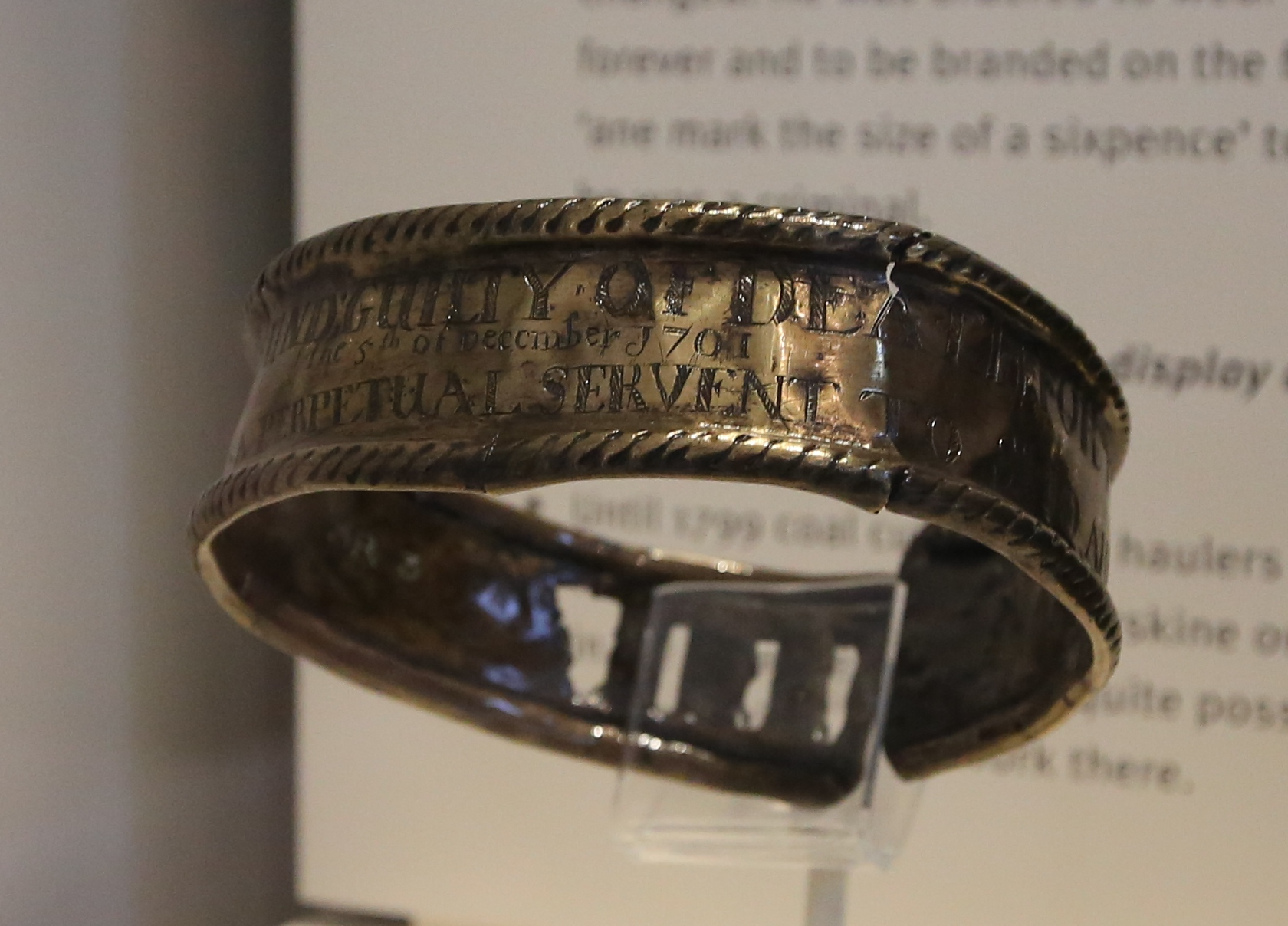
Scottish serf's collar 1701

The novel initially deals with subject of the Payment of Arles, a form of serfdom for miners in the 18th century which meant that once a miner started work in a coal mine he was bound to the mine for the rest of his life. It was a custom for the master or landowner of the mine to give a gift to parents at the time of a child's baptism. The gift would then bind the child to work alongside the parents when they came of age.

In London the novel places McAsh at the center of the discontent of 1768 which saw working people become dissatisfied with a higher cost of living and poor wages. McAsh had become the leader of a gang of coal heavers, one of many such gangs of men who had the job of physically unloading the coal barges when they came into the city. The discontent eventually led to riots and unrest across the city.

After being caught in the middle of a riot, McAsh is captured and sentenced to transportation to America, a form of punishment which was often seen as an effective alternative to the death penalty during that period. Once arriving in the Colony of Virginia, McAsh is sold into slavery and made to work as a field hand before escaping to the western frontier and eventually finding his freedom.

== Historical persons from the novel ==
John Wilkes – A British politician and agitator from the period. Wilkes is often referred to throughout the book, very frequently in the disparaging tones members of the gentry use, who are concerned about his politics.

George Washington – The man who would become the first president of the United States. Washington is introduced briefly near the end of the book as a speaker in a meeting held in the Hall of Burgesses. Washington suggests to the meeting that Virginia should consider no longer importing British goods.
