= Whiteout (Follett novel) =

2004 novel by Ken Follett

- First edition (publ. Macmillan)
- Author: Ken Follett
- Language: English
- Genre: Thriller
- Publisher: Macmillan
- Publication date: 2004
- Publication place: United Kingdom
- Dewey Decimal: 823.914
- LC Class: PR6056.O45 W46

Whiteout (2004) is a thriller novel written by British author Ken Follett about the theft of a deadly virus from a lab in snow-covered Scotland.

== Plot summary ==
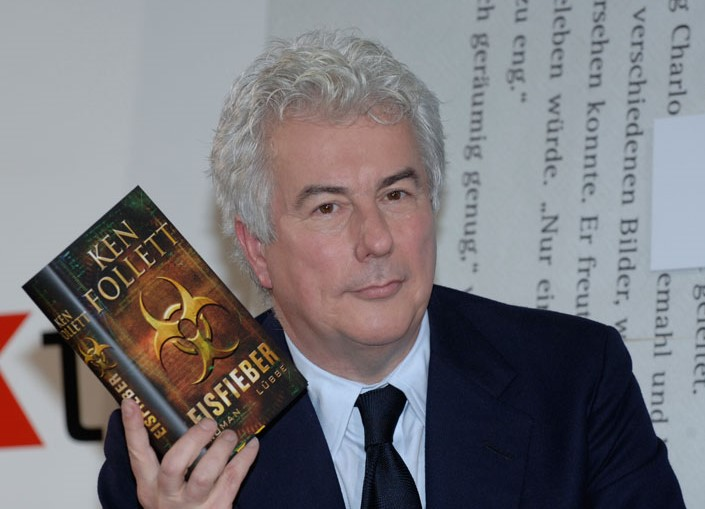
Ken Follett with his book Eisfieber (English: 'Whiteout') in October 2005

Toni Gallo, head of security, knows she has failed when a test rabbit for research on a more dangerous form of the Ebola virus is stolen from a lab in Scotland. But things are soon much worse when the virus itself is also stolen to be used in a terrorist attack, with inside assistance. Through a Christmas Eve blizzard, and with little help from the local police, Toni has to chase the thieves to recover the virus and save the future of the lab as well as prevent a dangerous outbreak. Meanwhile, she is falling in love with her boss, who is having the family over for Christmas at his nearby mansion.

Note: 1st edition novels are misprinted, pages 185-216 are replaced with the repeated pages of 153-184.

== German TV Adaption ==
In 2010, it was adapted for the ZDF channel as a 2 part two-part television film called Ice Fever. Directed by Peter Keglevic, and starring Heiner Lauterbach, Isabella Ferrari, Tom Schilling, Matthias Brandt, Sophie von Kessel, Katharina Wackernagel and Anneke Kim Sarnau. The German-Italian prestige production cost 7 million euros to make. Although the reviews were poor, "Wooden dialogues, lousy acting performances". Thorsten Dörting of Spiegel Online stated in 2010 "Mrs Pilcher now has the plague" (referring to British author Rosamunde Pilcher, whose adapted works on ZDF are extremely popular).
