= Triple (novel) =

Spy novel by Ken Follett

- First edition (publ. MacDonald & Jane's Publishers Ltd)
- Author: Ken Follett
- Language: English
- Publication date: 1979

Triple is a spy thriller novel written by British author Ken Follett. It was originally published in 1979. The background of the plot is Operation Plumbat, a 1968 covert operation carried out by Mossad that did not become publicly known about until 1977.

== Plot summary ==
The book's prologue describes a chance meeting of several people in Oxford University in 1947. The main character is Nathaniel "Nat" Dickstein, a victim of experimentation in the Nazi concentration camps who later becomes an Israeli agent; also the American Alan "Al" Cortone, of Italian origin, whose life Dickstein saved in Sicily; and the Russian chessmaster David Rostov, who subsequently joins the KGB. The three go together to a sherry party given by Professor Ashford, who teaches Hebrew Literature at Oxford. Dickstein, who is studying under Ashford, is in love with his Lebanese wife Eila, but there are rival suitors. Another guest, Yasif Hassan, of Palestinian origin, has an affair with Eila, as later seen in Professor Ashford's garden. Ashford's daughter, Suza, also makes an appearance.

In the first chapters Pierre Bourg, the head of the Mossad, finds out in 1968 that Egypt is building a nuclear reactor in the Western Desert, in order to produce a nuclear bomb. He assigns his best agent, Nat Dickstein, to steal about two hundred tons of uranium ore for Israel, to pre-empt the potential Egyptian threat and to enable them to build a nuclear bomb themselves. Dickstein has to ensure that nobody suspects Israeli participation in the theft.

Dickstein travels to Luxembourg to obtain documentation on all uranium shipments from the EURATOM agency located there. He eventually achieves this by blackmailing a EURATOM employee. In his hotel he has a chance encounter with Yasif Hassan, who is now an Egyptian Mukhabarat agent. As a result of this the KGB gets onto Dickstein's tail. For practical reasons, and also because in 1948 he successfully hijacked an arms shipment at sea, Dickstein decides to make the uranium theft from a maritime transport of yellowcake ore, from a freighter called the Coparelli.

Dickstein is persistently followed by Rostov's KGB group, to which Hassan now also belongs. This culminates in the tailing of all Israeli diplomats in London by the KGB. Despite this, Dickstein succeeds in repeatedly shaking off his pursuers. He travels to Oxford to see Professor Ashford again. Instead of his former teacher, the now grown-up daughter Suza Ashford answers the door. They have a candid conversation and fall in love. A short time later, Hassan visits the Professor (whose sympathies were already pro-Arab), and tells him of Dickstein's true activities and plans. The two persuade Suza to help eliminate Dickstein. She pretends to go along with this in order to be in a better position to warn her lover of this danger. Hassan also intends to deliver the uranium to the Palestinian Fedayeen, betraying both Rostov and the Egyptians.

To facilitate the robbery at sea, Dickstein acquires the Stromberg, a sister ship of the Coparelli, and founds a bogus maritime company. He also arranges for the Coparelli to suffer a mechanical breakdown at sea, and for the crew to be almost completely disembarked. Through further complicated measures, Dickstein hopes to erase traces of the uranium theft.

Israeli naval commandos aboard the Stromberg are to attack the Coparelli, but Hassan and his Fedayeen arrive first. However Dickstein and the Israelis recapture the Coparelli, and Hassan is killed. Dickstein then goes alone to board the Soviet ship Karla, that is also in the area, as Suza Ashford is a prisoner there. Rostov and a KGB force are aboard. Suza is able to create a diversion, enabling Dickstein to rescue her and destroy the Karla by means of a magnetic mine.

The story ends with the statement that Dickstein has left Mossad to settle with Suza in Israel. The book concludes with a newspaper article appearing in the Daily Telegraph in 1977, revealing that Israel is suspected of involvement in the disappearance at sea of the uranium shipment nine years earlier.
