= Circle of Days =

2025 historical fiction novel by Ken Follett

- Author: Ken Follett
- Audio read by: Richard Armitage
- Language: English
- Genre: Historical fiction
- Publisher: Grand Central Publishing
- Publication date: 23 September 2025
- Publication place: United States
- Pages: 752
- ISBN: 978-1538772775

Circle of Days is a historical fiction novel by Welsh author Ken Follett. It was published in 2025 by Grand Central Publishing and is set in the Neolithic period, when Stonehenge was created.

== Background ==
=== Development ===
Follett visited Stonehenge with his family as a boy, and later, his wife, Barbara Follett, as the Minister of State for Creative Industries, Media and Arts from 2008 to 2009, worked to transform the historical landmark into a public site. However, it was not until Follett came across the 2022 book How to Build Stonehenge by archaeologist Mike Pitts that he became interested in writing such a novel, stating, "I saw it and I thought, 'That sounds like a Ken Follett story; building Stonehenge,' So I looked into it, and the more I learned about this place, the more intrigued I became."

In the research process, Follett drove around Salisbury and used his imagination to envision how people lived, what they called themselves, and why they chose to build the structure during prehistoric times. Consultants for the project included Pitts and Phil Harding.

=== Release ===
On 13 May 2024, it was announced that Follett had signed a publishing deal with Hachette Book Group to release his next novel the following year. On 15 October 2024, Hachette announced the expected release date of 23 September 2025, published in the United States by its imprint Grand Central Publishing and the United Kingdom by Quercus.

People magazine exclusively revealed the cover on 12 March 2025.

== Plot summary ==
The novel is set in prehistory 2500 BCE; people are divided into tribes, each named according to their role, such as miners, herders, woodlanders, and farmers. The people meet each season at the wooden Monument for religious rites and festivities, led by priestesses.

The primary protagonist, Seft, is a former flint miner who joins the herder community in order to escape his abusive family. He partners with Neen, a girl he was immediately attracted to from the previous Rite. Neen's younger sister, Joia, finds her calling as a priestess. When the Monument is destroyed, Joia is determined to rebuild it in stone. As years pass, troubles include a drought that leaves the people starving and unwilling to share resources between the tribes; in addition, tensions rise as the farmers, led by Troon—a misogynistic and violent man—wage war against the herders.

== Critical reception ==
Writing for Library Journal, Philip Zozzaro praised in likeness to the author's other works, "Follett is skilled at creating literary sagas populated by compelling characters, and this title continues in that fashion." Likewise, Bethany Latham of Booklist saw Circle of Days to have a familiar Follett plot of a large cast that focuses on advancement, where readers "will find the epic tale they seek".

Holly Smith of Washington Independent Review of Books was more ambivalent, calling it "wildly oversimplified", usual casting of overt heroes and villains, and "clunky" dialogue. Kirkus Reviews believed that fans will be pleased, calling it "a dramatic, complex imagining of the origins of Stonehenge".
