= The Third Twin =

Novel by Ken Follett

- Author: Ken Follett
- Language: English
- Genre: techno-thriller
- Set in: United States
- Publisher: Macmillan
- Publication date: 1996
- Pages: 504
- ISBN: 978-0-3336-6809-2

The Third Twin is a 1996 techno-thriller book by Ken Follett. A New York Times bestseller, the book deals with genetic engineering and the nature and nurture debate through the subject of identical twins raised apart.

== Plot summary ==
Jeannie Ferrami, Psy.D., is an associate professor and criminality researcher at the fictional Jones Falls University (JFU), an Ivy League school in Baltimore, Maryland. (Note: In the acknowledgments of the book, Follet mentions "Professor Trish VanZandt and her colleagues" at Johns Hopkins University in Baltimore, on whom the fictional Jones Falls is modeled.) She studies the influence of genetics—rather than upbringing—on personality. Her interest in criminal tendencies is influenced by the fact that her father, Pete, is an incarcerated burglar. Financially strained, she sends her Alzheimer's-afflicted mother to live in a sub-par nursing home.

Jeannie's friend, Lisa Hoxton, is raped during the evacuation of an on-campus locker room. Police determine that the perpetrator was a serial rapist who intentionally set off the alarm. Lisa works with sympathetic police officer, Lieutenant Michelle Delaware, to create a facial composite of the suspect.

Jeannie meets law student Steven Logan, who participates in her study, prompting mutual attraction. Jeannie's software finds links in medical data and has identified him as the twin of an incarcerated murderer, Dennis Pinker. This seems to confirm Steve's fears that he is unable to control his own violent impulses. Berrington "Berry" Jones, a prominent researcher at JFU and Jeannie's mentor, is shocked to see Steve. He contacts his two partners—Preston Barck and United States Senator Jim Proust—in Genetico, Inc., (Note: In some editions of the book the company is called "Threeplex.") a medical research company that heavily funds JFU. Berry, Barck, and Proust believe that the involvement of Steve and Pinker in the study will jeopardize Genetico's $180 million sale to international conglomerate Landsmann, and with it Proust's presidential campaign. Berry disrupts Jeannie's research by alerting the press of ethical issues about her software. Soon after, Steve is arrested for Lisa's rape when Lisa picks him out of a lineup, but Jeannie believes his claims of innocence. Steve is released on bail.

Jeannie and Lisa visit Pinker; he is identical to Steve, but had no twin at birth and was born two weeks after Steve in a different state. Both men's fathers were in the military when the couples sought fertility treatments at the Aventine Clinic in Philadelphia, Pennsylvania. She visits Aventine, which was founded by Genetico in 1972 to pioneer in vitro fertilization. Jeannie escapes an attack by the rapist, whom she mistakes for Steve. Returning to Baltimore, she learns Steve was there during the attack, confirming that the rapist was the titular "third twin." The identical men are clones, illegally implanted into women treated at Aventine. Jeannie's software is run on an FBI database, but Berry again raises ethical concerns, limiting Jeannie's access to the database. To regain access, Jeannie must prevail in a discipline-committee hearing. Steve competently defends her, but Berry secures Jeannie's dismissal via bribes. Pete, meanwhile, had been released from prison for good behavior, and he helps Jeannie steal the data.

Jeannie travels to New York City with Lieutenant Delaware to meet Wayne Stattner. He is a fourth twin, and an evident a sadist, but he has an alibi for Lisa's rape. Steve's father, Colonel Charles Logan, reveals that the motivation for the cloning was a "super-soldier" program; Steve was literally bred to be a killer. Col. Logan runs Jeannie's search on Pentagon computers, yielding three suspects: Henry King, George Dassault, and Harvey Jones. Jeannie and Lisa prove that Harvey Jones of Philadelphia is the rapist. Harvey is Berry's son, whom Berry sends to spy on Jeannie by impersonating Steve. Jeannie detects him and Steve subdues him. Jeannie, Lisa, and Steve crash the Landsmann-Genetico press conference. Steve tries to spy on Berry, who restrains Steve and frees Harvey. Lisa brings King, Dassault, and Stattner to the press conference; Harvey is present and Steve also arrives, drawing the press' attention. Steve realizes that his identity is determined by his autonomy rather than his genes or his upbringing.

Nine months later, Jeannie and Steve prepare to take their honeymoon. Genetico and its founders have been discredited; Pete has started a profitable private security business, and Harvey is in prison. Jeannie has taken a lucrative position at Landsmann, and has moved her mother into a better facility.

== Film adaptation ==
An eponymous 1997 television film produced by CBS starred Kelly McGillis as Doctor Jean Ferrami, Larry Hagman and Jason Gedrick as Steve Logan, Harvey Jones, and the other clones. It deals with similar themes as Cloned, which was released only a month prior by NBC, but The Third Twin received greater acclaim.

== Reception ==
Carlos Ramet noted that the character of Jeannie Ferrami, one of the novel's main protagonists, is an example of the change in Follet's writing, i.e. "the change in emphasis from male to female perspective" and the development of capable and heroic female characters. Kirkus Reviews published a review calling the characters "lackluster" and the story a "slow-starter," but gave Follett credit for his depiction of the difficulties faced by rape victims pursuing justice.
