= Night Over Water =

1991 novel by Ken Follett

- First edition (UK)
- Author: Ken Follett
- Language: English
- Publisher: Macmillan Publishers (UK); William Morrow (US)
- Pages: 688

Night Over Water is a thriller novel written by author Ken Follett in 1991.

Night Over Water is a fictionalized account of the final flight of the Pan American Clipper passenger airplane during the first few days of World War II, early September, 1939. Follett is careful to state that, though the flight and all of the characters are fictional the plane, a Boeing 314, was real and was nicknamed the "Pan Am Clipper." It was a flying boat, an aircraft that landed in the sea, not on an airstrip, powered by 4 propeller engines. It was capable of crossing the Atlantic Ocean in little more than 24 hours with intermediate stops in Shannon Estuary at Foynes, Ireland, Bay of Exploits at Botwood, Newfoundland and Shediac Bay, Canada, at each of which stops Follett adds a scene or two of intrigue. This route made the Pan Am Clipper the fastest mode of transatlantic travel at the time — and very appealing to those who wanted to escape from Britain before the start of the war.

The tale begins with several separated threads, telling the individual stories of the people who later all end up in this last flight to New York. Though Follett bundles all these together, the events the characters share while travelling with the clipper are still told through the perspectives introduced before. Each of these main characters is heading for his own interests in the beginning but soon they melt together.

The theme is the importance of recognizing the threat of totalitarianism and also a feminist message of women standing up for themselves.
