= Never (novel) =

2021 novel by Ken Follett

- Author: Ken Follett
- Language: English
- Genre: Thriller
- Published: 9 November 2021 (Macmillan)
- Publication place: United Kingdom
- Media type: Novel
- Pages: 832
- ISBN: 1529076935 (first edition)

Never is a 2021 thriller novel, written by British author Ken Follett. It is the buildup of nuclear war involving the United States, North Korea, and China.

== Plot ==
Set in a version of the present day, Never charts several different major events with the power to cause a global upheaval: French and U.S. agents trailing terrorists in the Sahara; a Chinese spymaster with political ambitions; a woman being trafficked by people smugglers; the United States' first female president navigates a minefield while dueling her blustering political opponent. Eventually, events spiral that could lead to conflict that could cause the end of the world. The book includes multiple different POVs switching between them after the conclusion of a chapter.

== Reception ==
The Washington Post praised the novel, deeming it 'urgent and fiercely compelling'. The New York Times criticized some plot choices but found the ending 'sobering'. Kirkus Reviews also commended Follett's combination of topical and entertaining, as well as the scope of the storytelling. Complete Review awarded the novel a B, dubbing it a 'suspenseful ride'. Publishers Weekly called the novel 'powerful and commanding'.
