= Jackdaws (novel) =

World War II spy thriller by Ken Follett

- First edition cover
- Author: Ken Follett
- Audio read by: Kate Reading
- Genre: Spy thriller
- Publisher: Dutton Books
- Publication date: 3 December 2001
- ISBN: 0-525-94628-4

Jackdaws is a World War II spy thriller written by British novelist Ken Follett. It was published in hardcover format in 2001 by Dutton Books, then reissued as a paperback book by Signet Books in 2002. An audiobook narrated by Kate Reading was released in August 2002.

== Plot ==
A week or so before D-Day, a group of French resistance fighters tries to take out a critical telephone exchange in Sainte-Cécile. Felicity, who goes by Flick, is the group leader. The attack is a disaster, with many of the fighters killed or captured. Flick escapes with her wounded husband Michel, who is a resistance leader and is having an affair with a younger lady. Dieter Franck is a German Army officer working for Field Marshall Erwin Rommel. Rommel is on the coast, preparing for an invasion attempt by the Allies, and sent Dieter into France to gauge the strength of the French resistance. Dieter, an expert interrogator, witnessed the attack, seeing trained, brave fighters with plenty of weapons. Under interrogation, he forces one of the captured prisoners to tell him about Michel and Mademoiselle Lemas, who is the contact for Allied agents entering France. Flick heads back to London, where she develops a new plan, using a team of women dressed as cleaning women to enter the building in Sainte-Cécile and destroy the exchange. She recruits a six-woman team: Denise, a Lady; Maude, a driver for FANY who exaggerates the truth; Diana, daughter of the Baron where Flick's mom is a servant and Flick grew up, who is a crack shot; Ruby, who is in prison and killed another prisoner; Jelly, an explosives expert; and Greta, a friend of Flick's brother and a female impersonator who is a telephone exchange expert. Training follows. Diana and Maude develop a lesbian relationship. Denise is kicked off the team, because she talks too much. Paul is an American on the staff of General Montgomery and falls for Flick.

In France, Dieter tries to infiltrate the resistance groups. He gets Mademoiselle Lemas to reveal how she is contacted by resistance fighters. Dieter's French girlfriend Stephanie assumes the role of Mademoiselle Lemas and is able to convince Helicopter, a new radio operator, that she and Dieter are part of the resistance.

Flick senses something wrong at their original drop site, so she and her team parachute into France at an alternate location. This thwarts Dieter's first attempt to capture Flick. It becomes a cat and mouse, with Dieter making it more and more personal to capture Flick. Flick, on the other hand, doesn't know how much Dieter has been able to deduce about her team. Flick and her team travel from their drop to Paris and then on to Reims. Photos of Flick are on posters everywhere. Diana and Maude are captured in a fancy restaurant. Back in London, Paul has deduced that Helicopter was captured and that Flick may be in trouble, so he flies into France and makes his way to Mademoiselle Lemas place, where he is captured. Flick leads her team to Mademoiselle Lemas's house, looking for a place to hide. She finds Paul's toothbrush outside (he purposely dropped it there) and senses a problem. Flick and her team kill the two Gestapo officers inside the house, kill Stephanie and find Paul alive in the basement.

Flick and her team (minus Ruby, who was captured) manage to destroy the telephone exchange, but Greta is killed in the explosion. Dieter has managed to capture Michel and his young girlfriend, and has Michel reveal the pickup location for Flick's team. While Dieter waits for the plane, Michel is able to sound a car horn, alerting Flick of the danger. Dieter kills Michel and his girlfriend, but Flick stabs Dieter in the eye. Her team returns to London as the D-Day invasion begins.

One year later, we learn that Diana and Maude died in a German prison. Ruby married one of her training instructors. Mademoiselle Lemas survived the German prison. Flick and Paul are married and plan to live in Boston. Dieter is back in Germany with his wife, one eye missing and having mental issues.

== Characters ==
- Felicity "Flick" Clairet – SOE agent. She is the most experienced member of the resistance (being married to one of its leaders) and has taken more missions than any agent in SOE.
- Dieter Franck – German Army Intelligence officer working for FM Erwin Rommel. Unlike his colleagues he is not anti-Semitic and admires French culture, but he is still a German stereotype of efficiency; a shrewd detective and a ruthless interrogator, well versed in torture.
- Hans Hesse – Franck's right-hand man.
- Willi Weber – A zealous but narrow-minded Gestapo officer, Dieter's former colleague in the German police force.
- Percy Thwaite – Senior SOE agent, Flick's longtime superior and father figure.
- Paul Chancellor – OSS Major; aide to FM Bernard Montgomery; although he initially makes a bad impression on Flick, his admiration (and attraction) for her grows quickly.
- Michel Clairet – French Resistance leader, Flick's French husband; he is unfaithful to her, but is devoted to his country.
- Mademoiselle Lemas – French Resistance sympathiser.
- Stephanie - Dieter Franck's French mistress and a collaborator.
- Flick's team, the Jackdaws:
  - Ruby Romain – an Anglo-French prison inmate who is uneducated, but cunning and tough.
  - Diana Colefield, daughter of Flick's mother's employer, who grew up with Flick – an awkward aristocrat, but a brilliant markswoman.
  - Maude Valentine – an Anglo-French flirt, liar, and dreamer. She wants to see Paris.
  - Lady Denise Bowyer – another awkward aristocrat, recruited by one of Flick's fellow officers who is trying to steal credit from her team.
  - Geraldine "Jelly" Knight – Canadian explosives expert, the oldest of the Jackdaws.
  - "Greta Garbo" (Gerhard) – an Anglo-German telephone engineer and drag queen, has suffered much at the hands of the Nazis.
