= A Dangerous Fortune =

1993 novel by Ken Follett

- First edition (UK)
- Author: Ken Follett
- Language: English
- Genre: Historical fiction
- Published: 1993 (Macmillan (UK); Delacorte Press (US)
- ISBN: 0-333-58031-1
- OCLC: 28374472

A Dangerous Fortune is a novel written by British author Ken Follett in 1993. The story is set against the backdrop of collapse of a bank in 1866. The book also features Follett's first female villain, the domineering and unscrupulous Augusta.

== Summary ==
The prologue, set in 1866 at high society Windfield School, depicts the day of the accident. It introduces young college students, the main characters that we find throughout the novel. It also positions the place of each character in society. We also learn of two deaths, that of Peter Middleton and Tobias Pilaster, Hugh's father.

== Characters ==
- Edward Pilaster: Son of Joseph Pilaster, head of a wealthy banker family, at high level in society. In fifth at Windfield School in 1866.
- Micky Miranda: From a powerful and violent country-side family in Cordova in South America. In fifth at Windfield School in 1866.
- Solomon Greenbourne: Son of Ben Greenbourne, the very wealthy head of Greenbournes Bank in London. In fifth at Windfield School in 1866.
- Hugh Pilaster: Cousin of Edward's, and son of Tobias Pilaster. In lower fourth at Windfield School in 1866.
- Tobias Pilaster (Toby): Brother of Joseph Pilaster. Toby goes bankrupt in 1866 and takes his own life as a result.
- Antonio Silva (Tonio): From a capital side family in Cordova in South America. In lower fourth at Windfield School in 1866.
- Peter Middleton: In lower fourth at Windfield School in 1866. Died in the accident.
- Albert Cammel (Hump): Older boy at Windfield School in 1866, who also went swimming in 1866.
- Maisie Robinson: Daughter of emigrant Jews, whose father worked for Tobias Pilaster. She ran from home when her dad lost his job due to Toby's bankruptcy in 1866.
- Danny Robinson: Brother of Maisie Robinson. He also ran from home due to the bankruptcy, and boarded a ship to Boston in America as blind passenger.
- Augusta Pilaster: Mother of Edward and wife of Joseph Pilaster.
- Seth Pilaster: Senior chief in Pilasters bank at 1866.
