= World Without End (miniseries) =

Historical television ministries

- promotional poster
- Genre: Historical drama
- Based on: World Without End by Ken Follett
- Written by: John Pielmeier
- Directed by: Michael Caton-Jones
- Starring: Cynthia Nixon; Miranda Richardson; Ben Chaplin; Peter Firth; Charlotte Riley; Tom Weston-Jones
- Music by: Mychael Danna
- Countries of origin: Germany; Canada; United Kingdom
- Original language: English

Production
- Executive producers: Ridley Scott; Tony Scott; Rola Bauer; David W. Zucker; Tim Halkin; Jonas Bauer; John Weber
- Producers: Howard Ellis; Arnie Gelbart
- Cinematography: Denis Crossan
- Editors: Susan Maggi; István Király
- Running time: 374 minutes
- Production companies: Tandem Communications; Scott Free Productions; Take 5 Productions; Galafilm

Original release
- Network: Sat.1
- Release: 4 September – 23 October 2012

Related
- The Pillars of the Earth

World Without End is an eight-episode 2012 television miniseries based on the 2007 novel of the same name by Ken Follett. It is a sequel to the 2010 miniseries The Pillars of the Earth, also based on a Follett novel. World Without End is set 150 years after The Pillars of the Earth and chronicles the experiences of the English town of Kingsbridge during the start of the Hundred Years' War and the outbreak of the Black Death. The cast is led by Cynthia Nixon, Miranda Richardson, Ben Chaplin, Peter Firth, Charlotte Riley and Tom Weston-Jones. The miniseries differs significantly from the novel in both the plot and characterizations.

Filming took place in Hungary, Slovakia and Austria. John Pielmeier adapted the screenplay and Michael Caton-Jones directed all eight episodes.

== Overview ==
Set in England during the 14th century, the series chronicles the lives of ordinary medieval subjects. Edward III leads the nation into the Hundred Years' War with France, while Europe faced the Black Death. Caris (Charlotte Riley), a visionary woman, and her lover Merthin (Tom Weston-Jones) build a community that stands up to the crown and the church.

== Cast and characters ==
- Ben Chaplin as King Edward II / Sir Thomas Langley
- Charlotte Riley as Caris Wooler
- Nora von Waldstätten as Gwenda
- Oliver Jackson-Cohen as Ralph Fitzgerald
- Rupert Evans as Godwyn
- Tom Weston-Jones as Merthin Fitzgerald
- Cynthia Nixon as Petranilla
- Tom Cullen as Wulfric
- Blake Ritson as King Edward III
- Hera Hilmar as Margery
- Aure Atika as Queen Isabella
- Tatiana Maslany as Sister Mair
- Miranda Richardson as Mother Cecilia
- Peter Firth as Earl Roland
- Sarah Gadon as Lady Phillippa
- Ian Pirie as Elfric
- Carlo Rota as Edmund
- Kostja Ullmann as Holger
- David Bradley as Brother Joseph
- Caroline Boulton as Sister Elizabeth
- Megan Follows as Maud
- Indira Varma as Mattie Wise
- Dan Cade as Handsome Jim
- Hannes Jaenicke as Roger Mortimer

== Production ==
While acquiring the rights to The Pillars of the Earth from Ken Follett, Tandem Communications also secured a first right to negotiate a deal for World Without End, the sequel to the first novel. The project was announced in December 2010. The World Without End miniseries was co-produced by Tandem with Scott Free Productions, Canadian-based Take 5 Productions and Galafilm. John Pielmeier, who adapted The Pillars of the Earth, wrote the screenplay. Michael Caton-Jones signed on as director in March 2011.

Casting for the main roles was completed in June 2011, and filming began a month later in Europe. Shooting took place primarily in Hungary, where an entire medieval town was constructed on a 12,000 m^{2} backlot at Korda Studios west of Budapest. Additional location shoots took place in Slovakia and Austria.

== Broadcast ==
World Without End has been acquired by Sat.1 in Germany, Channel 4 in the United Kingdom, Shaw Media in Canada, Cuatro in Spain, ORF in Austria, Sky Italia in Italy, DR in Denmark and TV2 in Hungary. In the United States, Starz, which aired The Pillars of the Earth, could not reach an agreement with Tandem to air the show. The series was acquired by ReelzChannel instead.

In Canada it premiered on 4 September 2012 on Showcase; and in Australia on 7 December 2014, as 90-minute combined episodes on ABC. In the US, four 2-hour episodes were aired, the first on 17 October 2012 on ReelzChannel.

The eight hours were similarly divided into four episodes when broadcast in Italy on Sky Movies between 11 November and 2 December 2012. The series was broadcast under the title of Mondo Senza Fine with a choice of Italian-dubbed audio or the original English audio.

== Episodes ==
No.	Title	Directed by	Original release date
1	"Knight"	Michael Caton-Jones	4 September 2012
King Edward II has been defeated in battle by his wife Queen Isabella. She orders the arrest of her husband and crowns their son, who becomes Edward III. With the Queen's authority, Sir Roland returns to Kingsbridge as the new Earl of Shiring, arresting the previous incumbent for treason. Roland agrees to spare the lives of his two sons, with Ralph becoming his squire while Merthin is apprenticed to Elfric Builder. He also arrests Edmund Wooler, but the condemned man's daughter, Caris, and his sister, Petranilla, buy his freedom. Caris takes an interest in medicine and learns from Mattie Wise, the barber's daughter. A wounded knight, Sir Thomas Langley, makes his way to Kingsbridge priory in the hope of becoming a monk, but he carries a great secret that could spell the end for Kingsbridge.
2	"King"	Michael Caton-Jones	11 September 2012
It is the annual spring festival in Kingsbridge and many people have travelled to the area to trade. Elfric and Caris are married, and Caris tries to be an obedient wife, but does not love her husband. When she tries to get work for Merthin, she is beaten by Elfric. Merthin intervenes and both are thrown out of the house. Gwenda the Saxon is sold by her father to a local farmer in exchange for a cow. Sir Roland is about to be married, and Ralph, now his squire, gains the attention of several women. During the festival, Caris is horrified when her friend Mattie Wise is accused of witchcraft and sentenced to be executed. More tragedy ensues when the bridge to Kingsbridge collapses, and Petronilla seizes an opportunity to advance her son Godwyn's career. In London, King Edward III seizes control from his mother, Queen Isabella.
3	"Prior"	Michael Caton-Jones	18 September 2012
Many people are killed in the bridge collapse, including Gwenda's father Joby, Prior Anthony, and Mattie Wise. Earl Roland, however, is saved by Ralph and successfully treated by Caris using the techniques Mattie had taught her. Caris tries to convince Mother Cecelia to build a hospital where the sick could be properly treated. Roland soon marries Lady Marjorie, but learns that she is not everything he had hoped for. With the prior's death, Brother Godwyn makes his plans to become prior. His main opposition is Sir Thomas Langley, whom he manages to convince not to run. Merthin wins the contract to build the new bridge. The King sees a sign that makes him believe that he is not just the King of England, but also the lawful King of France.
4	"Check"	Michael Caton-Jones	25 September 2012
Godwyn, newly elected prior, begins to use his power in order to inflict his strict views on Kingsbridge. As a prior, he decides he wants a house of his own, but Mother Cecilia decides to spend the funds on Caris's proposed hospice instead. Godwyn, determined to do anything to get his way, plots to take the land from the nunnery, and has Merthin dismissed as the master bridge-builder. When he accuses Caris of witchcraft, Mother Cecelia can think of only one way to save her. Merthin confronts his brother Ralph when soldiers begin stealing wool from the Kingsbridge merchants. Ralph begins taking everything and anything he wants and soon finds himself in prison accused of a heinous crime. The King enters into war with France but it is taking longer than expected, and at the cost of many soldiers' lives. To replenish his army, the King orders prisoners be conscripted—including Ralph.
5	"Pawns"	Michael Caton-Jones	2 October 2012
It is now seven years later and Merthin lives in Florence, where he is married with a child. Caris continues practising medicine and cares for Gwenda's injured son. Sister Mair witnesses Brother Thomas having sex with another monk, a great sin, but after speaking with Caris, decides not to reveal them. The convent is left a sum of money, which would allow Caris to build her hospice, but Prior Godwyn is determined to get his hands on the money. Caris travels to France to seek assistance from the King, who is still at war. Surrounded by enemies, the King's first concern is to find a way to get his men back to England.
6	"Rook"	Michael Caton-Jones	9 October 2012
After tragedy strikes, Merthin returns to Kingsbridge. He wants Caris to leave with him, but she knows that leaving the convent would give Godwyn the excuse he needs to have her executed. Sir Ralph also returns, now a knight, but he is not well received by his master, Sir Roland, the Earl of Shiring. He is also rejected by Phillippa, who sees him as a convicted rapist. Gwenda and Wulfric can barely make ends meet, but Ralph, as their new lord, refuses to help. The plague comes to the village and many die. Caris tends to the sick, but Prior Godwyn flees with the other monks; only Sir Thomas stays behind. The plague gives Petranilla an opportunity for revenge.
7	"Queen"	Michael Caton-Jones	16 October 2012
Caris, Merthin, Brother Matthias, and Brother Thomas set out to find Brother Godwyn to reclaim the priory's treasure. When they find him, he has been driven half mad watching his fellow monks die around him. The King sends his beloved daughter to be married in Spain, but is heartbroken to learn that she has also died from the plague. The Queen returns from exile to mourn her granddaughter. Caris offers any peasant a fair wage if they will farm the fallow land around the priory. Gwenda is bound to the lord of Shiring, but decides to flee in order to take up Caris's offer. Sir Ralph learns the truth about his birth and comes down hard when some of his peasants stage a revolt. Petranilla continues scheming to advance her family.
8	"Checkmate"	Michael Caton-Jones	23 October 2012
Caris and Merthin decide they have no future in Kingsbridge and plan to leave together. Brother Thomas reveals his true identity and, together, they produce a charter ending the priory's control over Kingsbridge. Godwyn moves quickly to administer the death sentence placed on Caris now that she's left the Church. Wulfric and Gwenda decide to continue their battle against tyranny even if it means giving up their lives. King Edward III, knowing that his throne is at peril, decides to lead his army personally and stop the uprising.

== Home media releases ==
World Without End was released by Sony Pictures Home Entertainment on 4 December 2012 in DVD and Blu-ray Disc formats. The two-disc sets contain the featurette "The Making Of Ken Follett's World Without End".
