= The Evening and the Morning =

Novel by Ken Follett

- Author: Ken Follett
- Language: English
- Genre: Historical fiction, Novel
- Publisher: Macmillan
- Publication date: 2020
- Publication place: United Kingdom
- Media type: print
- Pages: 832
- ISBN: 978-1447278788
- Followed by: The Pillars of the Earth

The Evening and the Morning is a historical fiction novel by Welsh author Ken Follett. It is a prequel to The Pillars of the Earth set starting in 997 AD, and covering a period in the late Early Middle Ages and under the backdrop of Viking raids, through the year 1007. The book expands upon the history and founding of the fictional town of Kingsbridge, England, and the construction of the bridge and cathedral there (and the origin of the town's name is explained). It was released on 15 September 2020.

The title is a reference to Genesis 1:5. Follett has said that he has chosen biblical quotes for the titles of all his Kingsbridge novels as he feels that they have a more powerful and epic feeling.

A series based on the book is in the works at Legendary Television and Range Media Partners.

== Setting ==
In the Saxon-English society depicted in the book, the Catholic Church had not yet taken control of marriage. Rather, marriage is a civic ceremony; a man may "set aside" his wife at his pleasure and marry another, or have two wives. A woman may informally divorce her husband by leaving him. It is even possible—though rare—for a woman to marry two men. The Church frowns at all these practices but cannot prevent them. Many of the book's plot twists would have been impossible without this social situation.

The role of the king also differs from that of monarchs in other Follett books. King Ethelred, shown many years into his reign, does not have the level of control over England that later kings would have. Ethelred says that a king's duty is national security, sound currency, and little else, but other characters note that his purview does technically include other things, such as the welfare of noble widows. Ethelred's primary duty of defending the country from Viking raids creates tension between him and the nobles upon whom he depends to raise and lead armies. He is shown to have limited ability to enforce the law. For example, he fines a noble for improper conduct, but the noble refuses to pay.

== Characters ==
=== Perspective characters ===
- Ragna: Daughter of Count Hubert of Cherbourg who travels to England to marry Ealdorman Wilwulf of Shiring.
- Aldred: A young monk who wishes to make Shiring a center of learning by creating a vast library.
- Edgar: The son of a boatbuilder who shows talent in several forms of construction.
- Bishop Wynstan: A greedy bishop who uses his wit to increase his family's wealth and social status.

=== Other characters ===
- Ealdorman Wilwulf (also referred to as Wilf): The older half-brother of Wynstan and Wigelm and ealdorman of Shiring. He marries Ragna against the king's will after falling in love with her on a trip to Cherbourg.
- Wigelm: The younger brother of Wynstan and the half-brother of Wilwulf, he is a coarse but accomplished warrior.
- Blod: An enslaved Welsh teenager whom Edgar meets at Dreng's Ferry. The book tracks her through childbirth, escape attempts, and other changes in her situation.
- Dreng: A lazy and selfish ferryman and innkeeper distantly related to the Wynstan brothers.
- King Ethelred: A King of England preoccupied with Viking raids. At the time of the book, he is shown as a middle-aged, experienced king who can use his limited power effectively.

== Plot summary ==
In the aftermath of a Viking attack on the coastal town of Combe, a young boatbuilder named Edgar moves with his remaining family to Dreng's Ferry. This tiny village has an alehouse, a small minster, and a nunnery on a nearby island where nuns care for lepers. A young Norman noblewoman named Ragna travels to England to marry Ealdorman Wilwulf of Shiring only to find she is his second wife. He had put his first wife aside, angering both the king and the clergy (with the exception of his own half brother, Bishop Wynstan). A monk, Aldred, advises Ragna, who decides to make the best of things. She takes control of the ealdorman's household and her own lands in England. This annoys Wynstan, who had been skimming money from her rents. It also annoys his mother (Wilwulf's stepmother), who had been running the household. Ragna builds a reputation as a just and capable noblewoman and landlord and has three sons with Wilwulf.

Edgar builds a new ferry and befriends Blod, a Welsh girl enslaved to Dreng. Because Dreng prostitutes her, she gives birth to a baby. Dreng commits infanticide by throwing the newborn into the nearby river despite protest from Blod, Edgar, and both of Dreng's wives. Edgar gives evidence against Dreng at the local court, but Dreng goes unpunished. Blod attempts to flee back to Wales but is eventually recaptured.

Over the next several years, Aldred works with Edgar, Ragna, or both to address local problems, including bandits, corruption at the minster, acquisition of holy relics for the monastery, problems in the villages that pay taxes to Ragna, and attempts by Bishop Wynstan to produce counterfeit coinage. After Wynstan escapes punishment for counterfeiting, Aldred is sent away from Shiring's large monastery, where he had had some authority, to run the tiny minster at Dreng's Ferry. With Edgar's help, he slowly transforms the minster into a dutiful monastery. Edgar and Ragna develop mutual affection. Edgar builds a pontoon bridge at Dreng's Ferry so the monks can hold a market to raise funds, but Wynstan and Dreng secretly burn it down.

Wilwulf returns from a battle with a serious head injury, and Ragna rules in his place while he recovers. Wynstan, Wigelm, and their mother decide to murder Wilwulf so Wigelm can replace him as ealdorman. Wigelm and his men go to her villages and kill local elders loyal to her. Edgar witnesses the violence and escapes, and brings Ragna a warning and her funds. Wynstan and Wigelm kidnap Ragna and her sons before she can flee to Cherbourg. Wigelm rapes Ragna while she is held prisoner. Meanwhile, the king and his army attempt to pass through Dreng's Ferry to fight the Vikings. The king, who had chosen the route because of the bridge, is angry to find there is only a slow ferry. The king tells the monks to build a new bridge, which will be "the king's bridge" and under his protection.

Although Edgar and Aldred search for Ragna, they do not figure out where she is until Wynstan and Wigelm are ready to let her go. By then, she is pregnant with Wigelm's child. Ragna asks the king to name her regent, or acting ealdorman, until her oldest son can take Wilwulf's place, but the king needs a reliable military leader to help against the Vikings. He names Wigelm the new ealdorman. Ragna gives birth to a baby boy, whom Wigelm tries to claim as his heir. The king tells Ragna that he will not force her to marry Wigelm, but he will not take the boy away from Wigelm either. Wigelm and his mother coerce Ragna into marrying him, which neutralizes her politically. Edgar leaves England for France. He finds work as a builder for an Italian who is building a cathedral.

Wynstan seeks to become archbishop and makes inroads in religious communities. Ragna focuses on her villages and raising her four children. She learns through other women that Wynstan is showing signs of an illness called "Whore's Leprosy" (possibly neurosyphilis). She realizes she cannot tell Aldred this information because Wynstan will retaliate against her.

Aldred decides to build a new monastery cathedral to replace the crumbling minster. He sends monks to France to offer Edgar the job. They find him, but he asks if Lady Ragna is still married to Wigelm and declines to return. After an argument, Wigelm takes their son away from Ragna and gives him to his girlfriend and mother to raise. Wynstan develops more severe symptoms of Whore's Leprosy, including memory lapses and moments of rage and confusion. Nonetheless, he pursues the archbishopric. Ragna, realizing she had nothing left to lose, tells Aldred the reason for Wynstan's erratic behaviour. Aldred tells enough other clergy and Wynstan loses the nomination. Wynstan plans revenge but becomes confused. Wigelm becomes angry with Ragna and puts her aside.

Ragna moves with her three older sons to Dreng's Ferry, then called Kingsbridge, and befriends Blod. By then, Dreng has a new enslaved girl whom he abuses and prostitutes. Blod and Ragna notice that the new girl is pregnant long before Dreng does. By then, only one of Dreng's wives is still alive. When Dreng discovers that the slave girl is pregnant, he begins to beat her. When Blod and Dreng's wife interfere, Dreng has a heart attack. Ragna makes sure no one can blame Blod for Dreng's death. Dreng's wife promises to free Blod and the other girl in her will, which Ragna has her dictate to Aldred in front of witnesses. When Dreng's wife dies, Kingsbridge finds she has left the alehouse to Blod. Blod decides to stay in Kingsbridge as a free woman.

While Ragna is visiting one of her villages, Wigelm and his men pass through. That night, a very drunk Wigelm tries to attack Ragna again. She fights back until Wigelm trips and falls. She holds his mouth and nose shut while he suffocates in his own vomit. She drags his body into the canal. The next day, the people believe that Wigelm fell into the canal accidentally. Ragna rides to Shiring and takes her youngest son back from Wigelm's mother.

In France, Count Hubert calls for Edgar demanding that he explain the English custom of putting a wife aside, telling Edgar that Wigelm has insulted Ragna by divorcing her. Edgar returns to England, and he and Ragna reunite and marry. Wynstan continues to deteriorate. Aldred (who has received permission for the seat of the diocese to be moved from Shiring to Kingsbridge) brings him to the leper colony near Kingsbridge, where the nuns care for him alongside other sick and mentally ill people.

== Critical reception ==
J.H. Bogran of the Washington Independent described The Evening and the Morning as "more of the same, with variation" relative to Follett's other books set in Kingsbridge. Geza Tatrallyay of The New York Journal of Books wrote, "The book is well-researched and well-written—all in all an excellent, engrossing read." Kirkus Reviews described this book as long and predictable, but acknowledged, "Follett is a powerful storyteller who will hold [the reader's] attention anyway."
