= The Armour of Light =

Novel by Ken Follett

- Author: Ken Follett
- Language: English
- Genre: Historical fiction, Novel
- Publisher: Macmillan
- Publication date: 2023
- Publication place: United Kingdom
- Media type: Print
- Pages: 752
- ISBN: 978-1447278832
- Preceded by: A Column of Fire

The Armour of Light is a historical fiction novel by Welsh author Ken Follett. It is the fifth book in the Kingsbridge Series, and is the sequel to A Column of Fire.

The Armour of Light takes place in the years 1792–1824 in Kingsbridge, the same fictional English town in The Pillars of the Earth. Historical events at that time that influenced the plot include the Industrial Revolution, the French Revolution and the Napoleonic Wars. The industrialisation of textile manufacturing plays the leading role in bringing the story forward.

Follett touches on themes common to many of his novels, including class conflict between the working class and a corrupt gentry, abuse of power, and forbidden love.

== Plot summary ==
In the English town of Badford in the late 18th century, Sal Clitheroe takes her son, Kit, to visit her husband, Harry, while he is at work. Harry and his team of workers begrudgingly follow the foolish orders of Will Riddick, the spoiled son of the local squire. Will’s recklessness leads to an accident that kills Harry. Due to Will’s wealth and status, however, there is little hope of any justice. To provide Sal with some income in the absence of her husband, Will’s family hires the six-year-old Kit to work in their manor house. While Kit works there, Will’s horse kicks him in the head, leaving him bedridden for six weeks. When Sal comes to collect her son, Will goads her into a confrontation, and when Sal hits him in the face, the squire has no choice but to banish Sal from the town. She decides to go to the nearby town of Kingsbridge. There, she is hired by Amos Barrowfield to work in his mill.

Amos is an ambitious young man. He is close friends with Will’s brother, Roger Riddick, and he is known as a Methodist with occasionally radical views about social reform. Amos is in love with Jane Midwinter, but she spurns his advances as she wishes to marry a wealthy man. Amos finally inherits his family business when his father dies but discovers that his father ran up huge debts with a local merchant named Joseph Hornbeam. Amos tries to reason with Hornbeam, but Hornbeam is intent on taking over his company. With help from his friend Spade, a supplier of luxury cloth, Amos pays the debt, but in doing so, he makes an enemy of Hornbeam. With help from his friend Roger, Amos plans to modernize his mills with the latest machines. He hires Sal and Kit to help him. When he tries to bid for a military contract, however, Will Riddick (who runs procurement for the local militia) demands a bribe. Amos refuses, citing his Methodist faith.

Two years later, Sal and Kit still work for Amos. Spade begins a secret affair with Arabella Latimer, the wife of the bishop of Kingsbridge. The workers start a Socratic Society to educate themselves, but they face persecution from wealthy mill owners like Hornbeam, who fear that education may bring about social reform. Aided by Will, Hornbeam uses his power as a local justice to punish any challenge to the status quo, even though—as Spade finds out—he grew up poor in London. Amos continues to love Jane from afar, but she sets her sights on marrying the son of the local earl. Meanwhile, Elsie—the bishop’s daughter—loves Amos, but he is too in love with Jane to notice her. Instead, Elsie marries a priest named Kenelm who works for her father. Amid the chaos and social unrest, Sal marries her friend Jarge.

Three years later, many of the mills are more successful due to the military’s demands for uniforms, but the mechanization of labor means that many hands are out of work. The wars in Europe have driven up prices, and many people are starving. Amos sympathizes with the workers’ plight, but Hornbeam does not. The workers strike, and Hornbeam refuses to back down. He brings workers from Ireland and settles them in the town, hoping to break the strike. The strike only ends when he negotiates with the trade union, led by Sal, but trade unions are soon outlawed. Spade and Arabella continue their affair, but Arabella becomes pregnant. She tries to convince her husband that the baby is his, but he eventually comes to suspect Spade, and he rips up Arabella’s beloved rose garden to punish her. Sal tries to protest Hornbeam’s acquisition of a new machine, but he accuses her of being in a trade union. She is traumatized by her two months of hard labor in abusive conditions.

Amos witnesses the brutal unfairness of British press gangs who kidnap people and enlist them in the navy. The son of the man who is pressganged is eventually hanged after he is caught stealing to feed his mother; she takes her own life out of grief. Spade and Arabella continue their affair, though the bishop falls ill and dies. Once Arabella completes her year of mourning, they are free to marry, but gossip about their affair—spread by Hornbeam—ruins Spade’s chances of being elected. However, Spade learns that Hornbeam’s own mother was hanged as a thief. Hornbeam has hidden this secret for many years. Eventually, Spade marries Arabella. Kit realizes that he is in love with Roger Riddick. They start a relationship in secret and plan to go into business together, but their plans are put on hold when Kit is conscripted into the army. Jane seduces Amos, but his guilt at the affair prevents him from enjoying her love. Jane has Amos’s child, and he gradually realizes that he is falling out of love with her. At the same time, he feels an obligation to the baby he believes is his son.

Elsie convinces Amos to run for Parliament. He narrowly loses to Hornbeam, who uses immoral tactics to make people vote for him. Hornbeam also wants to spread rumors that Amos is the father of Jane’s child, but Spade uses his knowledge of Hornbeam’s past to force him to abandon this tactic. Hornbeam’s victory is dashed by the news that his beloved grandson Joe has enlisted in the army. Elsie has five children with Kenelm, though she never truly loves him. When his fervent desire for a promotion is again denied, Kenelm joins the war, believing that the only way to become a bishop is to first become a military chaplain. Jarge struggles to find work due to the new machines. He joins the Luddites, a group that smashes the machines to protest in the name of workers’ rights. When he sets fire to a mill, however, he forces Sal to perjure herself to defend him in court. Though Sal lies on his behalf, he is found guilty and nearly sentenced to death. Instead, he is sent to the army. Kit returns from the army and starts a business with Roger. Though they are successful at first, the war and the Luddites make their machinery business unfeasible. Roger accrues large gambling debts and decides to run away. Kit wants to join him, so he reenlists in the military; they are both sent to Spain. When the war is over, many of the characters travel to Brussels to celebrate. While they are there, however, the exiled Napoleon breaks free and reassembles his army, leading the British forces and their allies to make one final attempt to defeat Napoleon and the French army.

The allied forces face off against Napoleon at the Battle of Waterloo. Kit is given an important role, carrying messages between the Duke of Wellington and the Prussian army. Sal has followed Jarge to the frontline. She buys and sells supplies for the soldiers, making money. During the battle, Jarge sacrifices his life to save Joe Hornbeam. After the battle, Sal must bury him in a nearby churchyard. Kenelm also receives a fatal wound during the battle, leaving Elsie a widow. Northwood takes a blow to the head. He survives but, as Jane shows Amos, his mental capacity is reduced and his character is changed. As such, Jane invites Amos to become a father figure to his son. Back in Kingsbridge, the characters return from the war. Hornbeam is delighted to have Joe back but is shocked that Joe does not take his same hard line against working class people. Joe reveals that Jarge saved his life, and Hornbeam is stunned. Through Joe, he agrees to help Sal open a shop to support herself as a tribute to Jarge’s sacrifice. Sal settles down and eventually remarries. Hornbeam cannot live with himself, so he throws himself from the cathedral. Amos and Elsie eventually marry, living happily ever after. Spade becomes a Member of Parliament and campaigns for workers’ rights in London. Roger and Kit open their business together and—after Will’s death—move into the Riddick manor.

== Characters ==
=== Village of Badford ===
The Clitheroes

- Sal Clitheroe: a housewife and domestic spinner for the Barrowfields, and a Methodist. Lead protagonist.
- Harry Clitheroe: her husband, a farmhand at Badford Manor.
- Christopher "Kit" Clitheroe: their only son, born 1786.
- Ike Clitheroe: Harry's uncle, also a farmhand at Badford Manor.

The Riddicks

- Squire Riddick: Lord of the Manor, justice of the peace.
- Will Riddick: his eldest son, born 1762, an officer in the Shiring militia.
- The Reverend George Riddick: his middle son, rector of Badford and Overseer of the poor.
- Roger Riddick: his third and youngest son, born 1773, a student at Oxford university, an inventor and a gambler.
- Mr Platts: the butler at Badford Manor.
- Mrs Jackson: the cook
- Fanny "Fan": the maid
- Cecil: the footman

Other villagers

- Jimmy and Annie Mann: a farmhand and co-worker of Harry Clitheroe's, and his wife.
- Alec Pollock: a barber surgeon.
- Brian and Margaret Pikestaff: a selfowning farmer, and unofficial leader of the Badford Methodists, and his wife.

=== Kingsbridge ===
The Barrowfields

- Obadiah Barrowfield: a clothier, alderman and an Anglican.
- Mrs Barrowfield: his wife.
- Amos Barrowfield: his son, born 1773, an out-putter for the family clothier business, a Methodist and Sunday School teacher. Lead protagonist.

The Box family

- Joanie, and her daughter Sue: a spinning hand at Barrowfield's Mill.
- Jarge Box: her brother, a weaver at Hornbeam's Mill, and a bell-ringer.
- Dottie Castle: Joanie's and Jarge's aunt, their tenant.

The Northwoods

- Lord Northwood, The Earl of Shiring
- Henry, Viscount Northwood: his son, Colonel of the Shiring militia and a Whig MP.

The Latimers

- The Right Reverend The Lord Bishop of Kingsbridge, Stephen Latimer: Anglican bishop of Kingsbridge Cathedral.
- Mrs. Arabella Latimer: his wife.
- Miss Elsie Latimer: their daughter, born 1772, a Sunday School organiser.
- (Linda) Mason: their maid
- Reverend Kenelm Mackintosh: a Scotsman, the bishop's aide.

The Midwinters

- The Reverend Canon Charles Midwinter: Anglican Canon of Kingsbridge Cathedral and a Methodist leader.
- Janet Emily Midwinter: his deceased wife.
- Julian and Lionel: his two eldest children, Methodists and students at Edinburgh University.
- Jane: his daughter and youngest child, an aspiring socialite.
- Alderman Drinkwater: his father-in-law, the chairman of the Kingsbridge justices of peace.

The Shovellers

- David "Spade" Shoveller: a weaver, member of the Socratic Society, Methodist, and leader of the bell-ringers of the Anglican Cathedral
- Betsy: his late wife
- Kate Shoveller: his sister, one of the most accomplished seamstresses of Kingsbridge.
- Rebecca "Becca" Liddle: a seamstress and Kate's companion,
- Freddy Caines: the nephew of the late Mrs Shoveller, a Militia man and later soldier in the army.

The Hornbeams

- Alderman Joseph Hornbeam: a major clothier, an alderman, and a justice of the peace, arrived in Kingsbridge in 1757. Main antagonist.
- Linnie: his wife since 1773, a lowborn Londoner.
- Howard: his son
- Deborah: his daughter
- Joe: his grandson
- Simpson: the footman

Other townspeople of Kingsbridge

- Alfred "Alf" Nash: a dairyman, and a member of the Socratic Society
- Belinda Goodnight: Kingsbridge's leading gossip
- Jeremiah "Jerry" and Susanne Hiscock: a printer and member of the Socratic Society, and his wife.
- Sheriff Phil Doye: Kingsbridge sheriff.
- Constable Reg Davidson: assistant of Sheriff Doye.
- George "Gil" Gilmore: jailer.
- Morgan Ivinson: executioner.
- Isaac and Isobel Marsh: owner of a major dying business, and his daughter, a friend of Deborah Hornbeam's.
- Stan Gittings: a gambler.
- Sport Culliver: an owner of a gambling den.

=== Non-fictional characters mentioned ===
- Napoleon Bonaparte: Emperor of the French.
- Charlotte Lennox, Duchess of Richmond: Organiser of the Duchess of Richmond's ball.
- Ned Ludd: Fictional figurehead of the Luddites.
- Thomas Paine: Founding Father of the United States of America and author of the book "Rights of Man".
- William Paley: Anglican Archdeacon, Scholar, and author of the pamphlet Reasons for contentment: addressed to the labouring part of the British public.
- William Pitt the Younger: Prime Minister of the United Kingdom.
- Arthur Wellesley, The Duke of Wellington: a British military leader during the Napoleonic wars.
- John Wesley and Charles Wesley: Anglican priests, founders of Methodism and hymn writers.
