= Ken Follett =

British novelist (born 1949)

Ken Follett CBE FRSL
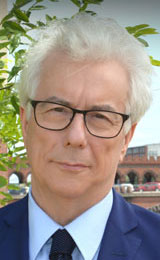
- Born: Kenneth Martin Follett; 5 June 1949 (age 77); Cardiff, Wales
- Citizenship: United Kingdom; France (since 2025)
- Education: University College London
- Occupation: Novelist
- Spouses: Mary Emma Ruth Elson (m. 1968–1985) Barbara Follett (m. 1985)
- Children: 2
- Relatives: Jann Turner (step-daughter)
- Writing career
- Period: 1974–present
- Genres: Thriller, spy novel, historical fiction
- Notable works: Eye of the Needle; The Key to Rebecca; The Pillars of the Earth; World Without End; Whiteout; Century Trilogy
- Website: www.ken-follett.com

Kenneth Martin Follett (born 5 June 1949) is a Welsh author of thrillers and historical novels who has sold nearly 200 million copies of his works.

Follett's commercial breakthrough came with the spy thriller Eye of the Needle (1978). After writing more best-sellers in the genre in the 1980s, he branched into historical fiction with The Pillars of the Earth (1989), an epic set in medieval England which became his best-known work and the first book in the Kingsbridge series. He has continued to write in both genres, including the Century Trilogy. Many of his books have achieved high ranking on bestseller lists, including the number-one position on the New York Times Best Seller list. (Note: Including Triple (1979), The Key to Rebecca (1980), Lie Down with Lions (1985), A Dangerous Fortune (1993), World Without End (2007), Fall of Giants (2010), Winter of the World (2012), and Edge of Eternity (2014).)

== Early life and education ==
Kenneth Martin Follett was born in Cardiff, Wales, on 5 June 1949, into a pious family of modest means. He was the first child of Martin Follett, a tax inspector, and Lavinia (Veenie) Follett, who went on to have two more children, Hannah and James. Barred from watching films and television by his Plymouth Brethren parents, he developed an early interest in reading but remained an indifferent student until he entered his teens. His family moved to London when he was ten years old. He described how, once he read through the children's section of the library, he was allowed to take out adult books and was inspired by Live and Let Die, saying it later inspired his first thrillers ten years later.

He began applying himself to his studies at Harrow Weald Grammar School and Poole Technical College.

In 1967, he was admitted to University College London, where he studied philosophy and became active in centre-left politics. He married Mary in 1968, and their son, Emanuele, was born the same year. After graduating in 1970, he completed a three-month postgraduate journalism course and began working as a trainee reporter for the South Wales Echo in Cardiff. In 1973, his daughter, Marie-Claire, was born.

== Career ==
After three years in Cardiff, he returned to London as a general-assignment reporter for the Evening News. Finding the work unchallenging, he eventually left journalism for publishing and became, by the late 1970s, deputy managing director of the small London publisher Everest Books. He began writing fiction in his evenings and on weekends as a hobby. Later, he said, he began writing books when he needed £200 to fix his car, and the publishers' advance a fellow journalist had been paid for a thriller was £200.

=== Further successes ===
Success came gradually at first, but the 1978 publication of Eye of the Needle, which became an international bestseller and sold more than 10 million copies, made him both wealthy and internationally famous.

Each of Follett's subsequent novels has become a best-seller, ranking high on the New York Times Best Seller list; a number have been adapted for the screen. As of January 2018, he had published 44 books. The first five best sellers were spy thrillers: Eye of the Needle (1978), Triple (1979), The Key to Rebecca (1980), The Man from St. Petersburg (1982) and Lie Down with Lions (1986). On Wings of Eagles (1983) was the true story of how two of Ross Perot's employees were rescued from Iran during the revolution of 1979. The next three novels, Night Over Water (1991), A Dangerous Fortune (1993) and A Place Called Freedom (1995) were more historical than thriller, but he returned to the thriller genre with The Third Twin (1996) which in the Publishing Trends annual survey of international fiction best-sellers for 1997 was ranked no. 2 worldwide, after John Grisham's The Partner. His next work, The Hammer of Eden (1998), was another contemporary suspense story followed by a Cold War thriller, Code to Zero (2000).

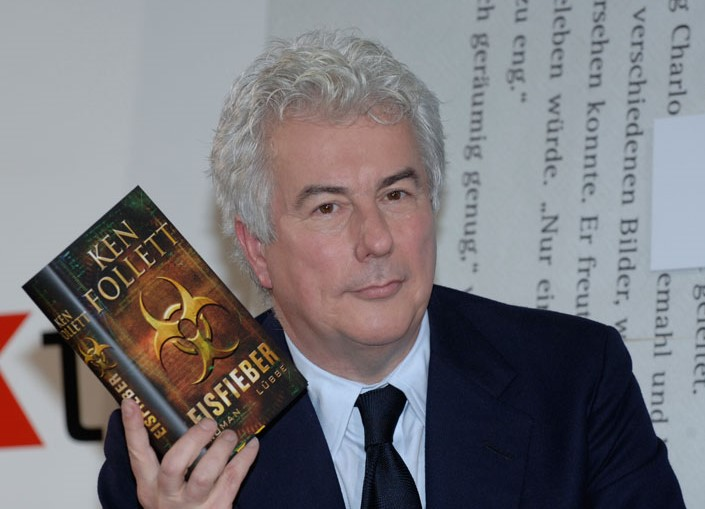
Follett with the German edition of his book Whiteout in October 2005

Follett returned to the Second World War era with his next two novels, Jackdaws (2001), a thriller about a group of women parachuted into France to destroy a vital telephone exchange – which won the Corine Literature Prize for 2003 – and Hornet Flight (2002), about a daring young Danish couple who escape to Britain from occupied Denmark in a rebuilt Hornet Moth biplane with vital information about German radar. Whiteout (2004) is a contemporary thriller about the theft of a deadly virus from a research lab.

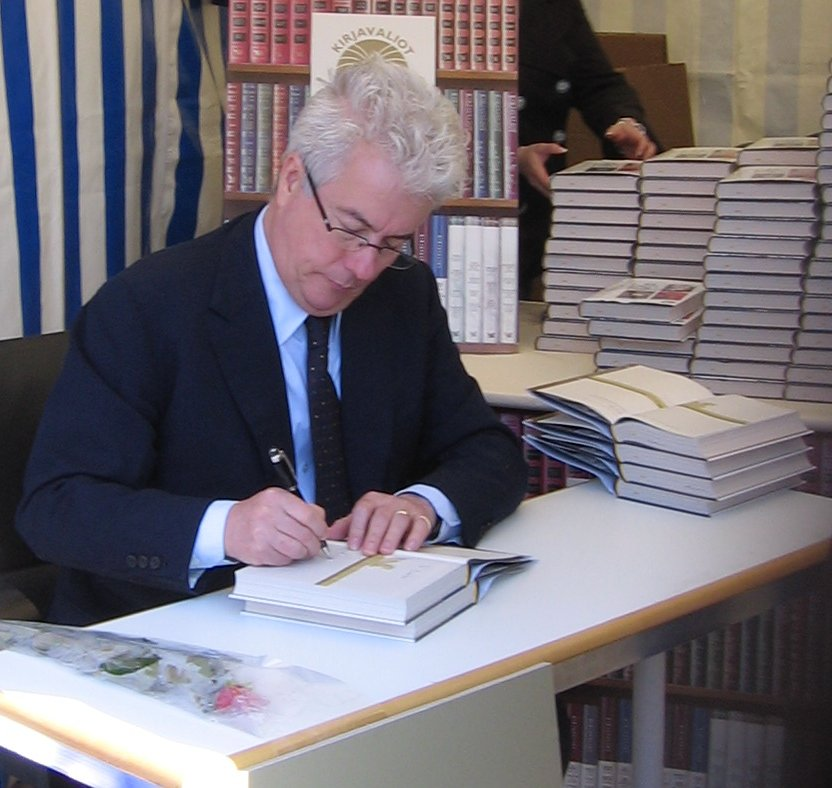
Follett in Helsinki, Finland, on World Book Day in 2005.

=== Kingsbridge series ===
The five-volume series has been described as "as comprehensive an account of the building of a civilization – with its laws, structures, customs and beliefs – as you are likely to encounter anywhere in popular fiction".

- The Pillars of the Earth (1989) was Follett's first non-spy thriller. The novel is about the building of a cathedral in a small English village during the Anarchy in the 12th century. The novel was highly successful, received positive reviews and was on The New York Times Best Seller list for eighteen weeks. It topped best-seller lists in Canada, Britain and Italy, and was on the German best-seller list for six years. As of 2017, it has sold 26 million copies. On 16 August 2017, a computer game adaptation by German developer and publisher Daedalic Entertainment was released.
- World Without End (2007) is its much-later sequel, that returns to Kingsbridge 157 years later, and features the descendants of the characters in Pillars. It focuses on the destinies of a handful of people as their lives are devastated by the Black Death, the plague that swept Europe from the middle of the 14th century.
- A Column of Fire (2017) begins in 1558 as the story follows the romance between Ned Willard and Margery Fitzgerald over half a century. It commences at a time when Europe turns against Elizabethan England, and the queen finds herself beset by plots to dethrone her.
- The Evening and the Morning (2020) is a prequel to The Pillars of the Earth. Set in the decade around 1000 AD – in the so-called Dark Ages – the story "concerns the gradual creation of the town of Kingsbridge and of the many people – priests, nobles, peasants, the enslaved – who played significant roles". As such, the book provides "a solid underpinning to the later installments of the Kingsbridge series".
- The Armour of Light (2023) is set in 1792, around the beginning of the Industrial Revolution. The book explores the societal upheaval following the invention of the Spinning Jenny in 1770. Set against the backdrop of Napoleonic wars and economic transformation, it follows interconnected characters: a widow coping with her husband's death in a factory accident, a young woman funding a school for impoverished children, a man inheriting a failing business, and a wealthy industrialist protecting his fortune at all costs. Amid war and social change, the story examines the human cost of progress and the struggle to rebuild a fractured world.

=== Century trilogy ===
Follett's novels Fall of Giants, Winter of the World and Edge of Eternity, make up the Century Trilogy. Fall of Giants (2010) followed the fates of five interrelated families – Welsh, American, German, Russian and English – as they moved through the world-shaking dramas of the First World War, the Russian Revolution and the struggle for women's suffrage. Fall of Giants, published simultaneously in 14 countries, was internationally popular and topped several best-seller lists.

Winter of the World (2012) picks up where the first book left off, as its five interrelated families enter a time of enormous social, political, and economic turmoil, beginning with the rise of Nazi Germany, through the Spanish Civil War and the great dramas of World War II, to the explosions of the American and Soviet atom bombs and the beginning of the long Cold War.

The final novel in the 'Century' trilogy, Edge of Eternity, which follows those families through the events of the second half of the 20th century, was published on 16 September 2014. Like the previous two books, it chronicles the lives of five families through the Cold War and civil-rights movements.

A major element of the first two volumes, Fall of Giants and Winter of the World, is the increasing political assertiveness of the British working class and the rise of the British Labour Party – exemplified by the Williams Family, Welsh coal miners, of which several viewpoint characters end up as Members of the British Parliament and one of them becomes a cabinet minister in Clement Attlee's post-WWII Labour government. However, the theme of British politics is nearly absent from the third part Edge of Eternity, which concentrates on the Cold War on the one hand and the US Civil Rights Movement on the other; for example, though the novel continues until 1989, it makes no reference at all to the rise of Margaret Thatcher in 1979.

== Adaptations ==
Follett has had a number of novels made into films and television mini series: Eye of the Needle was made into an acclaimed film, starring Donald Sutherland, and six novels have been made into television mini-series: The Key to Rebecca, Lie Down with Lions, On Wings of Eagles (1986), The Third Twin – the rights for which were sold to CBS for $US1,400,000, a record price at the time – and The Pillars of the Earth (2010) and World Without End (2012).

A video game adaptation titled Ken Follett's The Pillars of the Earth, developed and published by German studio Daedalic Entertainment, was released in three parts from 2017 to 2018.

Follett had cameo roles as the valet in The Third Twin and later as a merchant in The Pillars of the Earth. In 2016, A Dangerous Fortune was also adapted.

Pillars of the Earth and A Column of Fire have both been adapted into Danish-language musicals. Pillars of the Earth had its world premiere 12 October 2016 at Østre Gasværk Teater, Copenhagen. A Column of Fire had its world premiere in 2019 at Bellevue Teatret, Klampenborg. Both of the musicals were written by Thomas Høg, Lasse Aagaard, and Sune Svanekier.

== Public life ==
Follett is a member of various organisations that promote literacy and writing, and is actively involved in various organisations in his home town of Stevenage.

- Chair of the National Year of Reading 1998–99, a British government initiative to raise literacy levels.
- Fellow of University College, London (1994)
- Fellow of Yr Academi Gymreig – the Welsh Academy (2011)
- Fellow of the Royal Society of Arts
- President, Dyslexia Action (1998–2009)
- Patron, Schools Radio (2007–)
- Chair of the Advisory Committee, Reading Is Fundamental (RIF) UK (2003–)
- Board Member, National Academy of Writing (2003–)
- Trustee, National Literacy Trust (1996–)

He is active in numerous Stevenage charities and was a governor of Roebuck Primary School for ten years, serving as the Chair of Governors for four of those years.

On 15 September 2010, Follett, along with 54 other public figures, signed an open letter published in The Guardian stating their opposition to Pope Benedict XVI's state visit to the UK.

He has also donated £25,000 to the Yvette Cooper campaign in the 2015 Labour Party (UK) leadership election, as well as another £25,000 from his wife Barbara Follett.

In 2021, he donated all proceeds from his book Notre-Dame: A Short History of the Meaning of Cathedrals, amounting to €148,000 (£127,000), to help with the €2.4 million restoration of the Gothic architecture of Saint-Samson cathedral in Dol-de-Bretagne, Brittany, France.

Follett's archival papers are housed at the Saginaw Valley State University in Michigan, United States. They include outlines, first drafts, notes and correspondence, original manuscripts, and copies of early books now out of print.

== Awards and recognition ==
- 2025 – Made an Officer of the Legion of Honour by the Embassy of France in London.
- 2021 – Made an Honorary Citizen of Dol-de-Bretagne.
- 2019 – Made an Honorary Doctor of Letters by the University of Warwick.
- 2019 – Made an Officer of the Order of Arts and Letters by the Government of France.
- 2018 – Appointed Commander of the Order of the British Empire (CBE) in the 2018 Birthday Honours for services to literature.
- 2018 – Elected a Fellow of the Royal Society of Literature (FRSL).
- 2013 – Made a Grand Master at the Edgar Awards in New York.
- 2012 – Winter of the World won the Qué Leer Prize for Best Translated Book of that year in Spain.
- 2010 – Fall of Giants won the Libri Golden Book Award for Best Fiction Title in Hungary that year.
- 2010 – Made a Grand Master at Thrillerfest V in New York.
- 2008 – Won the Olaguibel Prize for contributing to the promotion and awareness of architecture.
- 2008 – Made an Honorary Doctor of Literature by the University of Exeter.
- 2007 – Made an Honorary Doctor of Literature by the University of Glamorgan.
- 2007 – Made an Honorary Doctor of Literature by Saginaw Valley State University.
- 2003 – Jackdaws won the Weltbild Readers' Prize at the Corine Literature Prize ceremony in Bavaria.
- 1999 – Hammer of Eden won the Premio Bancarella literary prize in Italy.
- 1979 – Eye of the Needle won the Edgar Best Novel Award from the Mystery Writers of America.

== Personal life ==
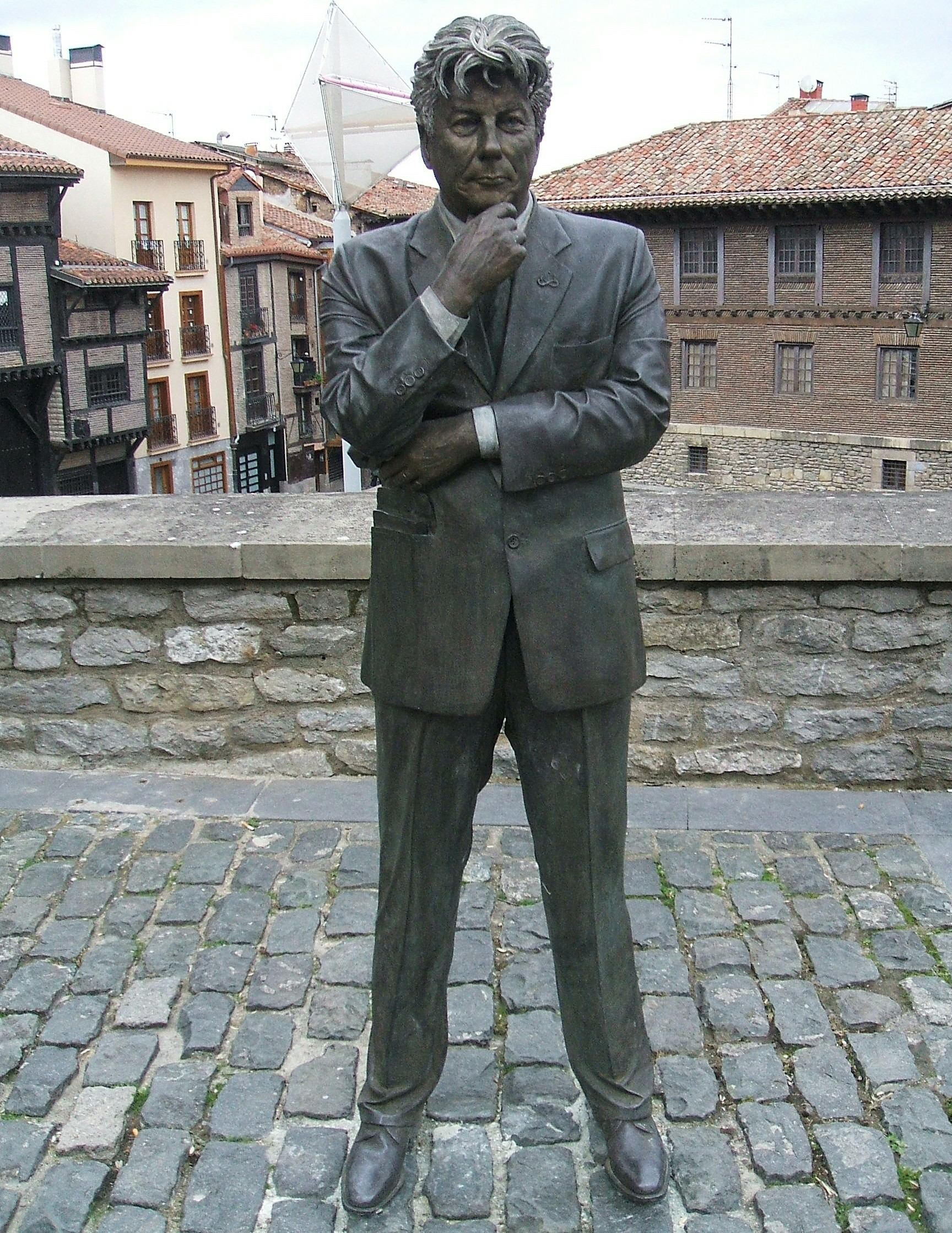
Follett statue in Vitoria-Gasteiz, Basque Country, Spain

Follett was married to Mary Emma Ruth Elson from 1968 to 1985 and they had two children, Emanuele (born 1968) and Marie-Claire (born 1973). The family lived in Grasse, as Follett has always had an affection for France.

Follett became involved in the activities of Britain's Labour Party during the late 1970s. In the course of his political activities, he met Barbara Broer, a Labour Party official, who became his second wife in 1984. She was elected as a Member of Parliament in 1997, representing Stevenage. She was re-elected in both 2001 and 2005, but did not stand in the 2010 general election. Follett himself remains a prominent Labour supporter and fundraiser as well as a prominent Blairite.

During university, Follett rebelled against his parents' "puritanical faith" and became an atheist. As of 2022, he is "still an atheist, but I do have a spiritual life".

He is an amateur musician playing bass guitar for Damn Right I Got the Blues, and appears occasionally with the folk group Clog Iron playing a bass balalaika.

In 2020, Follett first considered applying for French citizenship by naturalisation after Brexit, which he opposes; this decision followed a suggestion from an English friend who had already gone through the process. Follett applied for French naturalisation in 2021, and obtained it on 13 November 2025.

He now lives in Knebworth, Hertfordshire, England.

== Works ==
Apples Carstairs series (as Simon Myles)

- The Big Needle (1974; a.k.a. The Big Apple – U.S.)
- The Big Black (1974)
- The Big Hit (1975)

Piers Roper series

- The Shakeout (1975)
- The Bear Raid (1976)

Kingsbridge series

- The Pillars of the Earth (1989)
- World Without End (2007)
- A Column of Fire (2017)
- The Evening and the Morning (prequel, 2020)
- The Armour of Light (2023)

The Century Trilogy

- Fall of Giants (2010)
- Winter of the World (2012)
- Edge of Eternity (2014)

Standalone novels

- Amok: King of Legend (1976; as Bernard L. Ross)
- The Modigliani Scandal (1976; as Zachary Stone)
- The Mystery Hideout (1976; as Martin Martinsen; a.k.a. The Secret of Kellerman's Studio)
- The Power Twins (1976; as Martin Martinsen)
- Paper Money (1977; as Zachary Stone)
- Capricorn One (1978; as Bernard L. Ross; based on screenplay by Peter Hyams)
- Eye of the Needle (1978; a.k.a. Storm Island; Edgar Award, 1979, Best Novel)
- Triple (1979)
- The Key to Rebecca (1980)
- The Man from St. Petersburg (1982)
- Lie Down with Lions (1985)
- Night Over Water (1991)
- A Dangerous Fortune (1993)
- A Place Called Freedom (1995)
- The Third Twin (1996)
- The Hammer of Eden (1998)
- Code to Zero (2000)
- Jackdaws (2001)
- Hornet Flight (2002)
- The Ninety-Ninth Wife (written in 2003, then translated and published in France as La Belle et L'Oiseau in 2019)
- Whiteout (2004)
- Never (2021)
- Circle of Days (2025)
- The Deep and Secret Things (2027)

Non-fiction

- The Heist of the Century (1978; with René Louis Maurice, others; a.k.a. The Gentleman of 16 July (U.S.), Under the Stars of Nice, Robbery Under the Streets of Nice, and Cinq Milliards au bout de l'égout (1977). Translation from original French version.
- On Wings of Eagles (1983)
