= Lie Down with Lions =

1985 novel by Ken Follett

- First edition
- Author: Ken Follett
- Language: English
- Genre: Spy Novel
- Publisher: Hamish Hamilton
- Publication date: 1985
- Publication place: United Kingdom
- Media type: Print (paperback and hardcover) Ebook
- ISBN: 978-0-451-16350-9

Lie Down with Lions is a 1985 spy novel by Ken Follett. The book was published by Signet in paperback. Today it is available in print, CD and audiobook formats.

In 1994 it was made into a TV miniseries directed by Jim Goddard and starring Timothy Dalton and Marg Helgenberger that received mixed reviews.
