= The Man from St. Petersburg =

1982 novel by Ken Follett

- Author: Ken Follett
- Cover artist: Hamish Hamilton
- Language: English
- Genre: Secret history, historical thriller
- Publication date: 1982
- Publication place: United Kingdom
- Media type: Print (hardback & paperback)

The Man from St. Petersburg is a novel thriller by Welsh writer Ken Follett, published in 1982.

== Plot ==
The book is set just before the outbreak of World War I, against the background of the Anglo-German naval arms race. It is an account of how the lives of the main characters were interwoven with the success or failure of secret naval talks between the United Kingdom and the Russian Empire. In these, Britain had to win the support of Russia in order to make any headway with its navy and to counterbalance Germany's growing naval power. As a result, Tsar Nicholas’s nephew Prince Alexei was sent to London for high-level bilateral talks.

Lord Stephen Walden is married to Lydia, a Russian aristocrat. The visiting young Prince is her nephew and Walden is one of the people taking part in the talks. When Prince Alexei arrives in London, his presence arouses the interest of not only the establishment, but tragically that of Feliks, an anarchist.

Feliks, also a Russian, decides to assassinate Prince Alexei so that the Anglo-Russian negotiations would collapse. Having failed once to shoot the Russian prince, Feliks looked for alternative methods. Eventually, he learned that Lydia, his ex-lover, is married to Walden. He visits the Waldens’ home and is able to get details of the Prince’s whereabouts. His plot is foiled however when Lydia, guided by her intuition, realizes that Feliks had ulterior designs behind his inquiries on Prince Alexi. She tells her husband about Feliks’s visit.

As the drama unfolds, Walden’s daughter Charlotte gets to know the effervescent Feliks. It is through her that he discovers once more about the hiding place of the Russian prince. It is about this time that Charlotte also learns that her true father is not Walden, but Feliks. Lydia had been pregnant for two months before marrying Walden, but this fact was unknown to Walden himself.

Meanwhile, the Russian prince is being hidden in a country home owned of the Waldens. Feliks once again wheedles this piece of information from Charlotte. With her active support, Feliks hides himself right in the Walden home while the Special Branch are combing the entire village for him.

At this point, Feliks decides it is time to make his move. He sets the house on fire, which forces the prince to escape the flames. When the prince appears, Feliks shoots him dead. However, he also loses his life in his attempt to save Charlotte, who was trapped in the house by the inferno. When Walden later learnt of the paternity of Charlotte, he took it in his stride. For Feliks, it was a case of poetic justice.

In the final chapter, Winston Churchill, the First Lord of the Admiralty, arrives at the scene and formulates a comprehensive plan for damage control. Disposing of Feliks' body, hiding that such a person ever existed and regretfully informing the Tsar that his nephew died in the fire but had already signed the treaty. Thus, in common with the conventions of the secret history literary trope, the affair remains hidden from public scrutiny and the First World War breaks out on schedule.

== Other information ==
Writing the Blockbuster Novel by Albert Zuckerman, introduced by Follett, contains, in partial or complete form, the author's four drafts of the story, with commentary by Zuckerman, as well as an excerpt from the first draft of the actual novel, showing how it differed from the finished version.
