= Cathedral of the Sea (TV series) =

2018 Spanish-language television mini-series

- Spanish: La catedral del mar
- Genre: Historical drama
- Based on: Cathedral of the Sea by Ildefonso Falcones
- Written by: Ildefonso Falcones, Rodolf Sierra, Sergio Barrejón, Antonio Onetti
- Directed by: Jordi Frades
- Starring: Michelle Jenner; Aitor Luna; Daniel Grao; Pablo Derqui; Tristán Ulloa; Natalia de Molina; Andrea Duro; José María Pou; Silvia Abascal; Ginés García Millán
- Music by: Federico Jusid
- Country of origin: Spain
- Original language: Spanish
- No. of seasons: 1
- No. of episodes: 8

Production
- Executive producer: Albert Sagalés
- Producers: Jaume Banacolocha, Joan Bas
- Cinematography: Teo Delgado, Cuco Segura
- Editor: Carlos J. Sanavia
- Running time: 50–51 min
- Production companies: Atresmedia Televisión; Diagonal TV; La Catedral del Mar, A.I.E; Televisió de Catalunya

Original release
- Network: Antena 3
- Release: May 23 – July 18, 2018

Related
- Heirs to the Land

Cathedral of the Sea (Spanish: La catedral del mar) is a Spanish historical drama television series that originally aired on Antena 3 from May 23 to July 18, 2018. It is an adaptation of Ildefonso Falcones's novel La catedral del mar, which centers around the construction of the church of Santa María del Mar in Barcelona. Directed by Jordi Frades, it stars Michelle Jenner, Aitor Luna, Daniel Grao, Pablo Derqui, Tristán Ulloa, Natalia de Molina, Andrea Duro, José María Pou, Silvia Abascal and Ginés García Millán, among others.

The story is set in 14th century Barcelona (1319 to 1384), and tells of Arnau, a man of humble beginnings whose social ascent will lead him from misery to a comfortable life, which will awaken the envy of his enemies, who plot a conspiracy and will put his life in the hands of the Inquisition.

The series sparked a sequel, Heirs to the Land.

== Plot ==
In the fourteenth century, Barcelona, under the Crown of Aragon, is in one of its most prosperous moments in history: the city has grown up to the Ribera, a humble fishing district, where the church of Santa María del Mar is to be built. In 1319, a serf, Bernat Estanyol, flees with his infant son Arnau from Navarcles to Barcelona after Bernat's wife is raped and kidnapped by a feudal lord.

Episode 1 then proceeds to 1329 when Arnau is a young boy growing up in his uncle's home. Arnau is blamed for his cousin's death, which leads to the melancholy and eventual death of his aunt in Episode 2. It is in this year that construction begins on the church of Santa María del Mar, and Arnau assists the workers by bringing them water.

Episode 3 begins in April 1334 during a famine. Bernat is hung for participating in a riot to secure food that is hoarded by the aristocracy. After discovering a thief at the cathedral, Arnau is promoted to bastaix (stone carrier), carrying stones from Montjuïc to the cathedral, and is given a capçana (headdress to facilitate carrying heavy stones on the head). In 1339, he falls in love with the daughter of the tanner but is refused an offer of marriage. In 1342, the church is visited by Peter IV of Aragon, the count of Barcelona.

Episode 4 begins in 1342, when Arnau is married but continues an illicit affair with the tanner's daughter. Work is begun on a covered bridge from the Framenors Monastery to the port, which James III of Majorca had demanded be built to protect him from assassination attempts by bow and arrow, but after it is discovered that James has laid a trap for Peter IV, enticing him into the covered bridge, James fleas to Roussillon. Peter IV declares war against him and in 1343, Arnau is drafted to fight against the forces of James near Roussillon. While on tour, Arnau briefly meets his own mother, who has become a prostitute servicing the troops. Five years later, Arnau returns home to find Barcelona stricken with plague, to which his wife succumbs.

In episode 5, Arnau saves the lives of a Jewish family from an angry mob. In gratitude, the Jewish man teaches Arnau to become a cambist, or money changer. Arnau adopts a young orphan girl whose parents were killed by the plague. In 1356, Arnau, now a wealthy man, plans a solution to the problems related to the harbor in Barcelona. Ships find the harbor difficult to navigate during storms, seeking refuge at Salou or Tarragona. Ships must enter the harbor through a narrow passage one at a time and risk running aground in the sand that surrounds the harbor. Arnau purchases a galley to tug the lighter ships into the harbor. In a reversal of fortune, Arnau purchases the debts of his uncle's family, who had persecuted him since a boy, and sends them out of the city.

In episode 6, Peter of Castile attempts to attack Barcelona while the forces of Peter IV of Aragon are fighting in Majorca. Arnau sinks his own galley, blocking off the entrance to Barcelona harbor. As a reward for his courage, Peter IV of Aragon makes Arnau baron of Granollers, Sant Vicenç, and Montbui. The king gives one of the ladies of the court to be his wife, against the wishes of Arnau, and the move to Montbui Castle. Meanwhile, the tanner's daughter, who still loves Arnau but is working as a prostitute for Arnau's mother, finds out about the marriage. The local nobles do not recognize Arnau's authority due to his lowly birth. Arnau institutes reforms, banning the abuse of serfs and setting them free. By 1360, despite initial resistance, Arnau has become respected in the region, and he is elected Consul of the Sea in command of a small army.

Episode 7 deals with a plot by Arnau's wife to have her step-daughter raped, then married, by a knight so that she can someday legally collect Arnau's inheritance. Arnau's childhood friend, Joanet, now a priest, is part of the conspiracy. Subsequently, Joanet becomes a fanatical Inquisitor and given orders to the Pyrenees, as his friendship with Arnau dissolves. There is rising antisemitism in Castile during this time. Arnau's wife falsely accuses him of having an affair with a Jewish woman, an offense for which he is imprisoned.

In the finale, Episode 8, a plan is enacted by Arnau's enemies to try Arnau's mother as a witch, and Arnau himself as the spawn of the Devil, before the Grand Inquisitor of Aragon, Nicholas Eymeric. Joanet, Arnaus's Moorish slave, the tanner's daughter, and his adoptive daughter all attempt by various means to free him. This effort brings together two of Arnau's lovers, who must work together to free him. His friends foment a riot among the bastaixos and pay off the king of Barcelona, resulting in Arnau's freedom. In a dramatic penultimate scene, Joanet immolates himself and kills Arnau's wife. Arnau's Moorish slave has arranged for Arnau to legally marry his adoptive daughter, his true love, who herself was recently widowed. The series concludes with Arnau, his wife and son entering the completed church of Santa María del Mar on Assumption Day, August 15th, 1384.

== Cast ==
- Aitor Luna as Arnau Estanyol.
  - Hugo Arbués as Arnau Estanyol (child).
- Daniel Grao as Bernat Estanyol, Arnaus' father.
- Abel Vitón as Loco Estanyol, Bernat's father.
- Nathalie Poza as Francesca Esteve, Arnaus' mother.
  - Natalia de Molina as Francesca Esteve (young).
- David Venancio Muro as Pere Esteve, Francesca's father.
- Ana Labordeta as Francesca's mother.
- Ariadna Castellano as María Cardona, Arnau's first wife.
- Silvia Abascal as Elionor, Arnau's second wife.
- Pablo Derqui as Joan "Joanet" Estanyol, Bernat's adopted son.
  - Álvaro Villaespesa as Joan (child).
- Laura Domínguez as Joana, Joan's birth mother.
- Francisco José Lahoz as Oriol, Joan's birth father.
- Michelle Jenner as Mar, Arnau's adopted daughter.
  - Patricia Arbués as Mar (child).
- Jorge Usón as Felip de Ponts, Mar's first husband.
- Jaume Solà as Bernat, Arnau's and Mar's son.
- Andrea Duro as Aledis, Arnau's lover.
- Joaquín Notario as Gastó Segura, Aledis' father, a tanner.
- Veki Velilla as Alesta Segura, Aledis' sister.
- Fernando Sansegundo as Pau, Aledis' husband and Gastó's master tanner.
- Montse Peidro as Eulalia, Aledis's mother
- Juanma Cifuentes as Miquel, Arnau and Joan's landlord.
- Trinidad Iglesias as Marina, Arnau and Joan's landlady.
- Josep Maria Pou as Sahat, Arnau's Moor freed slave.
- Belén Ponce de León as Donaha, Arnau's housekeeper.
- Ginés García Millán as Grau Puig, Bernat's brother-in-law and employer.
- Nora Navas as Guiamona, Bernat's sister and Grau Puig's first wife.
- Eva Rufo as Isabel, Grau Puig's second wife.
- Críspulo Cabezas as Genis Puig, Grau's and Guiamona's eldest son.
- Anna Moliner as Margarida Puig, Grau's and Guiamona's daughter.
  - Lucía Díez as Margarida Puig (child).
- Óscar Rabadán as Jaume, supervisor in Grau Puig's workshop.
- Ali El Aziz as Ahmed, slave in Grau Puig's workshop.
- Julia Carnero as Habiba, slave in Grau Puig's household.
- Ramon Madaula as Hasdai Crescas, Jewish money changer.
- Paula Iwasaki as Raquel Crescas, Hasdai's daughter.
  - Anna Cortés as Raquel Crescas (child).
- Igor Szpakowski, Jucef Crescas, Hasdai's son.
  - Alejandro Fuertes as Jucef Crescas (child).
- Tristán Ulloa as Padre Albert, local priest.
- Fernando Sendino as Berenguer de Montagut, architect of Santa Maria del Mar.
- Andrés Lima as Ramón, María Cardona's father and a bastaix.
- Roser Pujol as Maria's mother
- Jordi Aguilar as Cesc, a bastaix.
- José Milán as Jordi, a bastaix.
- Pablo Olewski as Ramiro Terrasa, a bastaix.
- Kai Puig as Mallorquí, a bastaix.
- Mario de la Rosa as Narcís, a bastaix.
- Fernando Valdivielso as Josep, a bastaix.
- Alain Hernández as Llorenç de Bellera, Bernat's feudal lord in Navarcles.
- Jorge Kent as soldier of Llorenç de Bellera.
- Jonás Berami as Simó, blacksmith of Llorenç de Bellera.
- Iñaki Font as Jaume de Bellera, Llorenç's son.
- Sergio Peris-Mencheta as Nicolau Emeric, Grand Inquisitor of Aragon.
- Albert Prat as Inquisitor.
- Francesc Lucchetti as Inquisitor.
- Tacho González as King Pedro of Aragon.
- Joaquín Gómez as Perellós, royal advisor.
- Fernando Soto as Ferrán Montaner, Arnau's Captain during the war.
- Iria del Río as Blanca.
- Pepo Oliva as Pere.

== Production and release ==
Produced by Atresmedia Televisión in collaboration with Diagonal TV, La Catedral del Mar A.I.E and Televisió de Catalunya, it premiered on 23 May 2018 on Antena 3. The original broadcasting run ended on 18 July 2018. It averaged a good 17.4% audience share.

| No. | Title | Directed by | Original release date |
|---|---|---|---|
| 1 | "Fugitivos" | Jordi Frades | 23 May 2018 |
| 2 | "Hermanos" | Jordi Frades | 30 May 2018 |
| 3 | "Deseo" | Jordi Frades | 6 June 2018 |
| 4 | "Arrepentíos" | Jordi Frades | 20 June 2018 |
| 5 | "No somos como ellos" | Jordi Frades | 27 June 2018 |
| 6 | "Secretos" | Jordi Frades | 4 July 2018 |
| 7 | "Venganza" | Jordi Frades | 11 July 2018 |
| 8 | "Condenado" | Jordi Frades | 18 July 2018 |

The series sparked a sequel, Heirs to the Land.

== See also ==
- Santa Maria del Mar, the cathedral under construction which serves as background for the plot
