= Heirs to the Land =

Spanish television series

- Spanish: Los herederos de la tierra
- Genre: Historical drama
- Based on: Los herederos de la tierra by Ildefonso Falcones
- Directed by: Jordi Frades
- Starring: Yon González; Elena Rivera; Rodolfo Sancho; Michelle Jenner; Maria Rodríguez; Pere Arquillué; Manel Sans; Mercedes León; Natalia Sánchez
- Music by: Federico Jusid
- Country of origin: Spain
- Original language: Spanish
- No. of seasons: 1
- No. of episodes: 8

Production
- Executive producers: Atresmedia Televisión; Televisió de Catalunya
- Production location: Catalonia
- Cinematography: Teo Delgado
- Editor: Frank Gutiérrez
- Running time: 50 minutes
- Production company: Diagonal TV

Original release
- Network: Netflix
- Release: 15 April 2022

Related
- Cathedral of the Sea

Heirs to the Land (Spanish: Los herederos de la tierra) is a 2022 Spanish television series based on the novel of the same name by Ildefonso Falcones. Set in 14th-century Barcelona, it is a sequel to Cathedral of the Sea. The series premiered on Netflix on 15 April 2022, to be followed by a run on Atresmedia and Televisió de Catalunya.

== Premise ==
Set in 14th-century Barcelona, the plot follows the story of Hugo Llor, a 12 year-old-boy who dreams of becoming a ship builder. His life is not easy and he is forced soon to part away from his family, but he gains the support and protection of a respected old man: Arnau Estanyol, the main character of Cathedral of the Sea.

== Cast ==
- Yon González as Hugo Llor.
  - David Solans as Hugo Llor (young).
- Marta Belaustegui as Antonina, Hugo's mother.
- Bruna Cusí as Arsenda/Beatriz, Hugo's sister and future abbess of Bonrepòs Monastery.
- María Rodríguez Soto as Regina Vilanova, Jew converted to Christianity and Hugo's first wife.
- Elena Rivera as Caterina Llor, former Russian slave and Hugo's second wife.
- Aria Bedmar as Mercè, Hugo's adopted daughter and Arsenda's birth daughter.
  - Ana García as Mercè (child).
- Mercedes León as Barcha, Hugo's Moor housekeeper slave.
- Biel Montoro as Pedro, Hugo's employee in the tavern.
- Pere Brasó as glovemaker, Antonina's employer.
- Joan Carles Bestard as cooper of Sitges, Antonina's second husband.
- Rodolfo Sancho as Bernat Estanyol, corsair.
  - Arturo Sancho as Bernat Estanyol (young).
- Michelle Jenner as Mar Estanyol, Bernat's mother.
- Aitor Luna as Arnau Estanyol, Bernat's father and former Consul of the Sea.
- Jesús Carroza as Guerao, Bernat's right-hand man.
- Natalia Sánchez as Marta Destorrent, Bernat's second wife.
- Pedro Casablanc as Galcerán Destorrent, Marta's father.
- Críspulo Cabezas as Genís Puig, Count of Navarcles.
- Anna Moliner as Margarida Puig, Genís's sister.
- Pere Arquillué as Roger Puig, Genís's nephew.
- Clàudia Cos as Roger's wife.
- Claudia Longarte as Roger's sister.
- Manel Sans as Mateo, captain of the Puig's guards.
- Joan Bentallé as Tomeu, guard in the Puig's household.
- Fermí Herrero as Esteve, majordomo in the Puig's household.
- Nancho Novo as Jucef Crescas, Jewish money changer and Arnau's longtime friend.
- Clara Segura as Astruga, Jewish doctor and Jucef's wife.
- Gabriela Andrada as Dolça Crescas, Jucef's daughter, Regina's friend and Hugo's lover.
- Abel Folk as Mahir, Jewish vineyard master and Astruga's brother.
- Fermí Reixach as old Saúl, Astruga's father and Dolça and Saul's grandfather.
- Arnau Alsina Coll as Saul, Dolça's first cousin and bethroted.
- Màrius Hernández as Mosé Vives, Jewish doctor and Regina's first husband.
- Laia Fontàn as friend of Dolça.
- Pol López as Perro Calvo, thief and pogrom instigator.
- Fernando Albizu, master shipbuilder.
- Ettore Colombo as Domenico, Genoese prisoner working in the dockyard.
- Jordi Aguilar as Cesc, a former bastaix.
- Marta Rodrigo as Eulalia, Hugo's bethroted.
- Sergio Caballero as Jofré, tavern keeper and Eulalia's father.
- Míriam Alamany as Valença, Eulalia's mother.
- Jordi Banacolocha as Father Pau, a priest at Santa Maria del Mar.
- Rosana Pastor as abbess of Jonqueres Monastery.
- Mariona Perrier as Madre Juana, a nun at Jonqueres Monastery.
- Maite Gil as Teresa, a nun.
- Sergi Mateu as Bishop.
- Oscar Foronda as Official of the bishop.
- Lolo Herrero as King Juan de Aragón.
- Manuel Gancedo as King Martin de Aragón, Juan's brother.
- Clara Oliver as Margaret of Prades, second wife of King Martin.
- David Vert as King Alfonso V de Aragón, Martin's grandnephew.
- Laura Conejero as Maria of Castile, wife of King Alfonso.
- José Luis Cartes as steward of Maria of Castile.
- Babou Cham as Omar, a freed slave.
- Pedro Moya as slave trader.
- Nora Sala-Patau as Helena, a Greek slave.
- Mariano Nguema as Caterina's Moor slave.
- Kwame Ondo as herbalist's Moor slave.
- Ferran Herrera as Lord of Rocafort.
- Txema Lorente as royal doctor.
- Edgar Moreno as Officer in Constantinople.
- Jordi Planas as veguer.
- Francesc Galceran as bailif.
- Gal Soler as wedding notary.
- Daniel Aguilar as party boy.
- Lluís Marco as Hugo's and Mercè's lawyer.
- Christian Caner as Mateu.

== Production and release ==
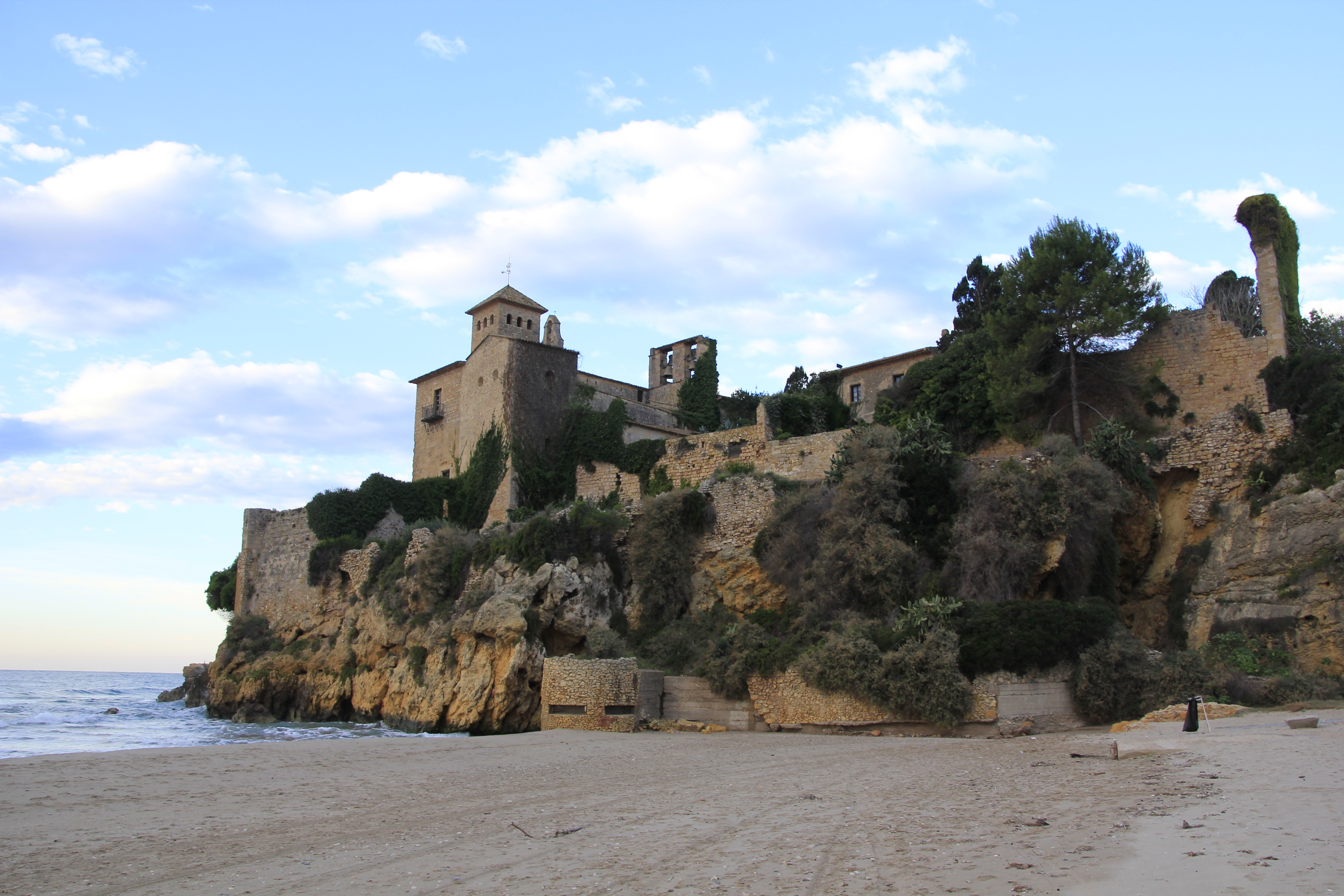
The Tamarit Beach was a shooting location.

Heirs to the Land is based on the novel Los herederos de la tierra by Ildefonso Falcones, published by Grijalbo in 2016. A sequel to Cathedral of the Sea, Heirs to the Land is directed by Jordi Frades, who also was the director of the former series. Produced by Diagonal TV, shooting began in Barcelona in November 2020. Shooting locations also included the Castle of Hostalric, province of Girona, as well as the Tamarit Beach in the province of Tarragona. The series was set for a exclusive release on Netflix for a 12-month initial streaming window, followed by a 3-month window on Atresmedia and Televisió de Catalunya.

The series premiered on Netflix on 15 April 2022.

No.	Title	Directed by	Original release date
1	"Destino"	Jordi Frades	15 April 2022
2	"Penitencia"	Jordi Frades	15 April 2022
3	"Talión"	Jordi Frades	15 April 2022
4	"Herida"	Jordi Frades	15 April 2022
5	"Esclavos"	Jordi Frades	15 April 2022
6	"Beatriz"	Jordi Frades	15 April 2022
7	"Veneno"	Jordi Frades	15 April 2022
8	"Redención"	Jordi Frades	15 April 2022
