= Nicholas Eymerich =

Roman Catholic theologian (c. 1316–1399)

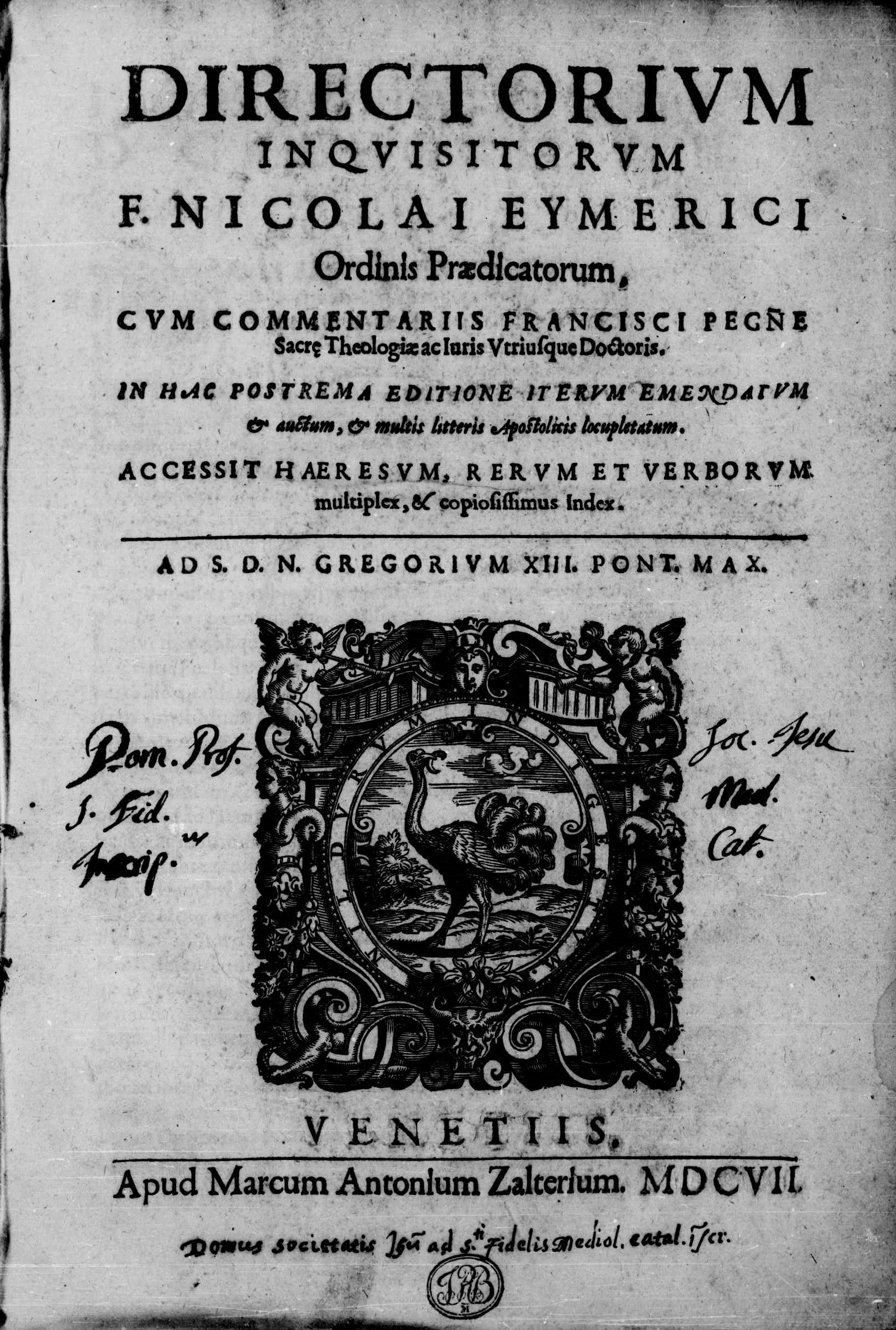
Directorium inquisitorum

Nicholas Eymerich (Catalan: Nicolau Eimeric) (Girona, c. 1316 – Girona, 4 January 1399) was a Roman Catholic theologian in Medieval Catalonia and Inquisitor General of the Inquisition in the Crown of Aragon in the later half of the 14th century. He is best known for authoring the Directorium Inquisitorum, that mostly summarized previous texts and mores.

== Life ==
=== Education and early tenure as Inquisitor General ===
Nicholas Eymerich was born in Girona c. 1316. He entered the local monastery of the Dominican Order on 4 August 1334. Here, during his novitiate he was instructed in theology by the friar Dalmau Moner. In order to complete his studies, he went to Toulouse, and then to Paris, where he obtained his doctorate in 1352. He then returned to the monastery in Girona where he replaced Moner as the teacher of theology.

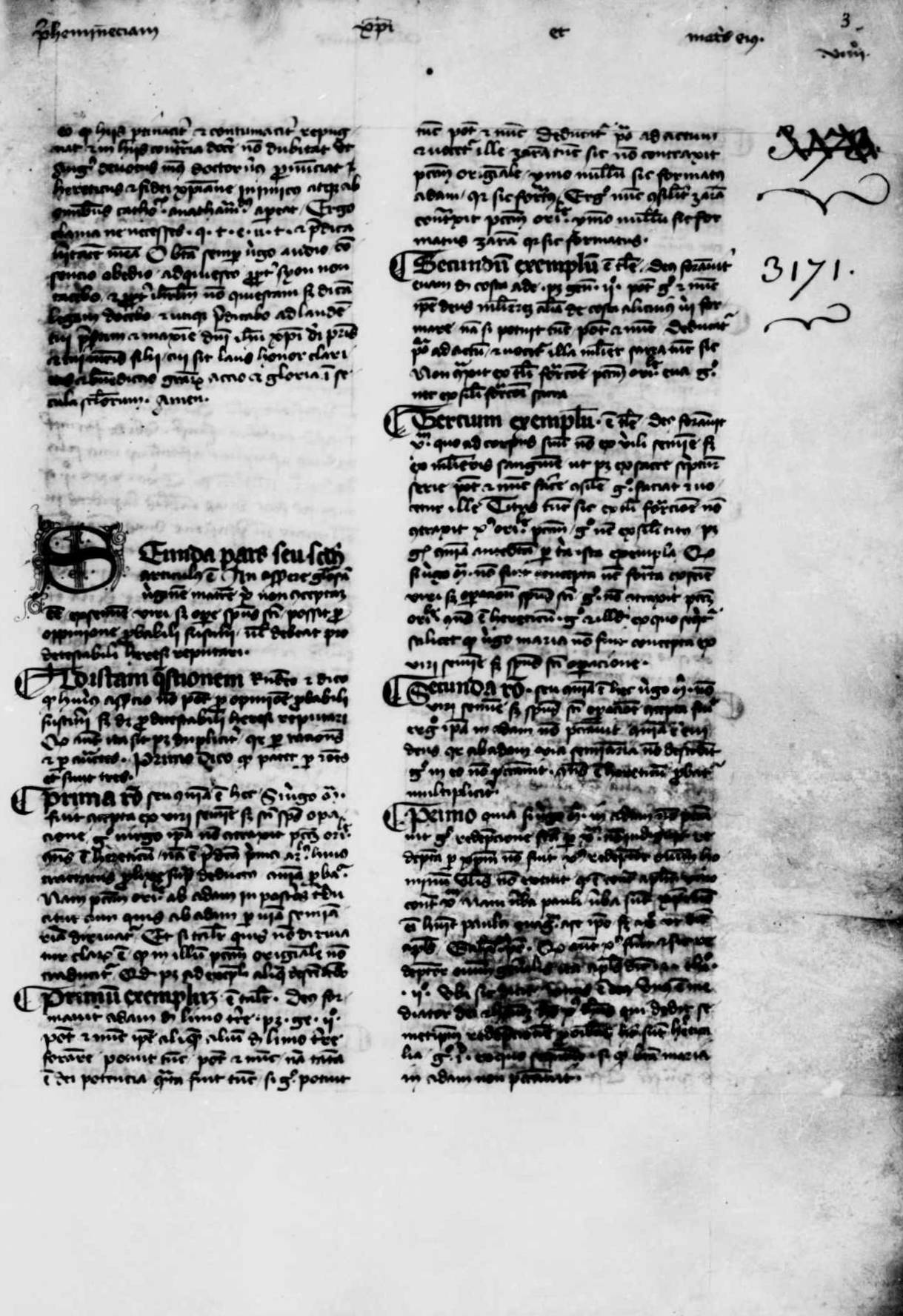
Collection of 13 treatises written by Eymerich. Manuscript, 14th-15th century. Paris, Bibliothèque Nationale de France.

In 1357, Eymerich replaced Nicola Roselli as the Inquisitor General of Aragon, as Roselli had been raised to a cardinal. A year after obtaining the position, Eymerich was given the honorific Chaplain of the Pope as a recognition of his diligence in pursuing heretics and blasphemers. However, the zeal he displayed as Inquisitor General earned him many enemies. As he directed much of his efforts to the apparent errors of members of the clergy, he often found his investigations blocked by the court, curia, or papacy. When Eymerich interrogated the Franciscan spiritualist, Nicholas of Calabria, King Peter IV of Aragon had him removed from office at the general chapter held at Perpignan in 1360.

Eymerich was elected to be the Vicar General of the Dominicans in Aragon in 1362 however, this election was contested by one of them: priest Bernardo Ermengaudi who, in addition to having a long-standing dispute with Eymerich, was also politically backed by Peter IV. When called on to settle the matter, Pope Urban V, invalidated Eymerich's election on the grounds that the office of Vicar General conflicted with the office of Inquisitor General. He did not, however, confirm Ermengaudi in the position, opting for a neutral third, Jacopo Dominici.

For a time Peter IV prevented Eymerich from serving as inquisitor. His hostility toward Eymerich intensified in 1366 when Eymerich began to attack the written works of Ramon Llull and to harass his followers, who were known as Lullists. The king forbade Eymerich to preach in the city of Barcelona. Eymerich disobeyed covertly and subsequently supported the revolt of the diocese of Tarragona against the monarch. This conflict ended around 1376 when the local governor took 200 horsemen and encircled the Dominican monastery where Eymerich was residing. Eymerich fled to the papal court of Pope Gregory XI in Avignon. While Raimon Llull supported the concept, now Dogma, of Immaculate Conception of Virgin Mary, Eymerich did not accept it.

An example of Eymerich as Inquisitor General is his sentence of the Jew Astruc Dapiera in 1370. Dapiera was a native of Barcelona accused of sorcery. He was sentenced to publicly repent in a cathedral and then to life imprisonment. He was the first inquisitor to circumvent the Church's prohibition against torturing a subject twice by interpreting directive very liberally, permitting a separate instance of torture for a separate charge of heresy. The Directorium Inquisitorum includes the sentence: "Quaestiones sunt fallaces et inefficaces", 'Interrogatories are misleading and futile'.

=== First exile and return ===
While living in Avignon, Eymerich completed his most famous work, the Directorium Inquisitorum. In 1377, he accompanied Gregory XI to Rome, where he remained until the Pope's death in 1378. In the schism that erupted after the death of Pope Gregory XI, Eymerich sided with Antipope Clement VII, and so returned to Avignon late in 1378. While living in Avignon, Eymerich conflicted with St. Vincent Ferrer, because Eymerich believed that Ferrer had begun to sympathize with Pope Urban VI, the Pope in opposition to Clement VII.

Eymerich returned to Aragon in 1381. Where he discovered that in his absence, Bernardo Ermengaudi had assumed the position of Inquisitor General. Eymerich refused to recognize Ermengaudi in that office, and in 1383, acting as Inquisitor General, notified the inhabitants of Barcelona that he had banned the works of Ramon Llull. Furious, Peter IV ordered Eymerich to be drowned, however, the Queen Eleanor of Sicily influenced him to change the sentence to permanent exile. Once again, Eymerich ignored the sentence and remained in his native land, thanks largely to the support of Peter's son, John.

King Peter IV died in 1386 and was succeeded by his son, John I, who recognized Eymerich's authority as Inquisitor General. At first, John I favored the repression of the Lullists, but this lasted only until 1388 when Eymerich decided to investigate the entire town of Valencia for heresy. King John I intervened to free the Chancellor of the University (secretary of the municipality), who had been imprisoned. Calling Eymerich a diabolicus fratrem, the King then forced him into exile again.

=== Second exile and return ===
After the violence at Valencia, Eymerich sought shelter from John's reprisals in a church, but two years later, retreated again to Avignon, where he remained until the death of King John I. In Avignon, Eymerich devoted himself to the defence of the legitimacy of Clement VII as Pope. He remained in Avignon after the death of Clement VII in 1394, writing in support of Clement's successor, Antipope Benedict XIII. After King John's death in 1396, Eymerich returned to the Dominican monastery in Girona, where he remained until his death on 4 January 1399. His epitaph describes him as praedicator veridicus, inquisitor intrepidus, doctor egregius (i.e. "a preacher of truth, intrepid inquisitor, excellent scholar").

== Writings ==
=== The Directorium Inquisitorum ===
Eymerich's most prominent and enduring work was the Directorium Inquisitorum, which he had composed as early as 1376. It defined witchcraft, and described means for discovering witches. In compiling the book, Eymerich used many of the magic texts he had previously confiscated from accused sorcerers. The Directorium Inquisitorum was to become the definitive handbook of procedure for the Spanish Inquisition until into the seventeenth century. It can also be considered as an assessment of a century and half of official Inquisition in the "albigensian" country. For another clergyman, the Directorium Inquisitorum is written in 'Barbarian Latin'.

=== Other works ===
Although the Directorium Inquisitorum was Eymerich's only book-length work, he wrote numerous tracts and papers on various theological and philosophical subjects.

A good deal of Eymerich's life and writings were taken with opposing the writings of Ramon Llull. Owing to Aymerich's work, Pope Gregory XI banned several of Llull's writings and issued a papal decree against some postulates derived from his works. He would later dedicate his Tractatus contra doctrinam Raymundi Lulli to Clement VII. In this document, he indicated 135 heresies and 38 errors in the Lullists' theology. His Dialogus contra Lullistas is another example of his anti-Lullist works.

Eymerich also wrote numerous works, including his Tractatus de potestate papali (1383) defending the legitimacy of the Avignon antipopes, Clement VII and Benedict XIII.

== Variant spellings of Aymerich's name ==
There appears to be very little scholarly consensus on the spelling of Aymerich's name. "Nicolau Aymerich" is the correct form of his name in medieval Catalan language spelling, and the most used form in Catalan, although nowadays it would be spelled "Eimeric". Aymerich, or Eimeric, is still a common Catalan surname, also a French name, as in Aimery de Gramont, an oncologist, "Nicolau" is the Catalan spelling for "Nicholas". Jose Meir Estrugo, in his book about 'Sephardim', points about a converse, Vidal Abnarrabí (Ibn-Arabí), who pick-up the surname Aymerich in Girona, 1492, this surname is found in the Hebrew communities of Salonica and Smirna. The Spanish spelling, "Nicolas" is also occasionally used. The title page of the 1578 impression of the Directorium Inquisitorum, which is printed in Latin gives his name as "Nicolai Eymerici", -ich being a derivative of Roman genitive -ici, also used as diminutive, to point a child's parenthood. The most common ways his name is spelled in English writing on the subject is "Nicholas Eymerich", with the spelling "Eymeric" being a close second. Occasionally, the Spanish form of Nicolas is used in English writings as well. Other, less common, variant spellings of his last name include, Emeric, Eimeric, Aimery, and Eymericus. The surname of blessed nun Anne Catherine Emmerich -Emmerick- comes from a town to which her family was bond, is not a Patronimic

== In popular culture ==
- Valerio Evangelisti, an Italian novelist, wrote a cycle of ten science fiction books between 1993 and 2002 featuring Eymerich as the main character. A French comic book series later adapted Evangelisti's novels.
- Eymerich is one of the main antagonists in the novel Cathedral of the Sea (2006) by Ildefonso Falcones. Eymerich is portrayed by actor Sergio Peris-Mencheta in the 2018 Spanish television adaptation of the novel.

== Bibliography ==
- Richard Gottheil & Meyer Kayserling, Astruc Dapiera at Jewish Encyclopedia Retrieved 8 April 2005
- Nicholas Eymeric at Encyclopædia Britannica Retrieved 8 April 2005
- Eymeric, Nicholas (1821) - Manual de Inquisidores, para uso de las Inquisiciones de España y Portugal - Translated from French into Spanish language, by J. Marchena (abridged version) - Imprenta de Feliz Avinon.
- Inquisition Retrieved 8 April 2005
- Valerio Evangelisti, Eymerich Storico (Historical Eymerich) Retrieved 7 March 2011
- Heinrich Finke: Nicolau Eimeric publicist in the beginning of western schism, in: Gesammelte Aufsätze zur Kulturgeschichte Spaniens, Vol 1, Münster, Germany, 1928, article: Drei Spanische Publizisten aus den Anfängen des grossen Schismas
- Andrés Ivars: Los jurados de Valencia y el inquisidor Fr. Nicolás Eymerich, Madrid, Spain, 1916.
- Faustino D. Gazulla, mercedarian: Historia de la falsa bula a nombre del obispo de Roma Gregorio XI inventada por el dominico fray Nicolás Eymerich, Palma de Mallorca, Spain, 1909
- E Grahit i Papell: El inquisidor fray Nicolás Eymerich, Girona, Catalunya, 1874. Includes a list of Aymerich' writings.
