= The Pillars of the Earth =

1989 historical novel by Ken Follett

- First edition
- Author: Ken Follett
- Language: English
- Genre: Historical fiction
- Publisher: Macmillan
- Publication date: 1989
- Publication place: United Kingdom
- Media type: Print
- Pages: 806
- ISBN: 978-0333519837
- Preceded by: The Evening and the Morning
- Followed by: World Without End

The Pillars of the Earth is a historical novel by Welsh author Ken Follett published in 1989 about the building of a cathedral in the fictional town of Kingsbridge, England. Set in the 12th century, the novel covers the time between the sinking of the White Ship and the murder of Thomas Becket, but focuses primarily on the Anarchy. The book traces the development of Gothic architecture out of the preceding Romanesque architecture, and the fortunes of the Kingsbridge priory and village against the backdrop of historical events of the time.

Before this novel was published, Follett was known for writing in the thriller genre. The Pillars of the Earth became his best-selling work. It was made into an 8-part miniseries in 2010, and a video game in 2017. The book was listed at no. 33 on the BBC's Big Read, a 2003 survey with the goal of finding the "nation's best-loved book". The book was selected in the United States for Oprah's Book Club in 2007. It is the first published book in Follett's Kingsbridge Series. Three sequels and a prequel, each set in Kingsbridge during a different century, were published from 2007 to 2023.

== Background ==
In the 1999 preface to The Pillars of the Earth, Follett tells readers that he grew up in a Plymouth Brethren family, whose worship space was very sparse. In preparing for writing, he was reading about medieval architecture, and:

... developed an interest in cathedrals. Before too long, it occurred to me to channel this enthusiasm into a novel. I knew it had to be a long book. It took at least thirty years to build a cathedral and most took longer because they would run out of money, or be attacked or invaded. So the story covers the entire lives of the main characters. My publishers were a little nervous about such a very unlikely subject but, paradoxically, it is my most popular book. It's also the book I'm most proud of. It recreates, quite vividly, the entire life of the village and the people who live there. You feel you know the place and the people as intimately as if you yourself were living there in the Middle Ages.

The novel's Kingsbridge is fictional. Follett set it in Marlborough, Wiltshire; he chose that location because the cathedrals of Winchester, Gloucester, and Salisbury could be reached from there within a few days on horseback. Kingsbridge Cathedral as described is based on the cathedrals of Wells and Salisbury. The Preface includes the following sources: An Outline of European Architecture, by Nikolaus Pevsner, The Cathedral Builders, by Jean Gimpel, and The Medieval Machine, by Jean Gimpel.

As well as the story of building a cathedral, and closely connected with it, the book depicts the growth of Kingsbridge from a backwoods village to a major town, the increasing wealth and assertiveness of the town's merchants and artisans, to the point of their being able to stand up to the feudal aristocracy and defend their autonomy. While Kingsbridge is a fictional town, such developments are well attested in the history of various actual towns, and form a major theme of late medieval history.

== Plot ==
=== Setting ===
The sinking of the White Ship leaves King Henry I of England without a clear heir. After he dies the Anarchy begins: his daughter, Maud, and his nephew, Stephen of Blois, fight for the throne. Ambitious nobles and churchmen take sides, hoping to gain advantages. The novel, which is divided into a prologue and six sections, explores themes of intrigue and conspiracy, against a background of historical events. It explores the development of medieval architecture, the civil war, secular/religious conflicts, and shifting political loyalties.

=== Prologue (1123) ===
A red-headed man is hanged for theft after being condemned by a priest, a knight, and a monk. His pregnant lover curses the men who condemned him, declaring that their children will be hanged, their enemies will prosper, and that they will live the rest of their lives with regret and sorrow.

=== Part One (1135–1136) ===
Circumstances leave mason Tom Builder and his family destitute and starving. After his pregnant wife Agnes dies in childbirth, Tom abandons his newborn by his wife's grave in the snowy woods, having no way to feed the infant. He later has a change of heart and returns, but finds the baby missing. After meeting up with an outlaw named Ellen and her son Jack, whom they had met earlier, the group discovers that Tom's infant has been taken to a monastery cell belonging to the Kingsbridge Priory. Knowing that he will be charged with abandonment if he says the baby is his, and confident that the monks will be able to look after him, Tom decides to leave the infant to the monastery. After several unsuccessful attempts to find work, Tom convinces Bartholomew, Earl of Shiring, to hire him to repair the walls of the Earl's castle.

Philip, the leader of the cell, is visited by his brother Francis, a priest, who warns him of a plot by Earl Bartholomew and the Earl of Gloucestershire against King Stephen. Philip tells Waleran Bigod, the ambitious archdeacon to the Bishop of Kingsbridge, of the plot, and travels to Kingsbridge Priory where the previous manager, Prior James, has died only a few days before. Waleran promises to make Philip the bishop's nomination for prior, practically guaranteeing Philip's election, in return for Philip's support to later make Waleran bishop though Waleran conceals that the bishop is also already dead. Philip agrees as the priory has become financially and spiritually destitute under Prior James, and he believes he can correct that. He wins, making enemies of the rivals for the post, in particular the sub-prior Remigius. Tom's infant, now named Jonathan, is sent to live with Philip at the priory.

Unsure of the validity of Philip's words, Waleran goes to the Hamleighs, a noble family who have been enemies of the Earl of Shiring ever since the earl's daughter, Aliena, rejected a marriage with William, the only son of the Hamleighs. Seeing this as an excuse for them to take their revenge, the Hamleighs take Bartholomew's castle and arrest the earl, forcing Tom and Ellen, now lovers, and their children into homelessness once again. They eventually settle in Kingsbridge, Tom hoping to get a job rebuilding the cathedral there. The family sees Jonathan during this time, although only Tom and Ellen know that he is Tom's son. To ensure that Tom will have work, Jack burns down the old Romanesque cathedral, telling no one else of his actions. After some convincing, Philip hires Tom to build the new cathedral.

Tom's strong son Alfred physically bullies smaller and weaker Jack through repeated acts of battery which creates friction with Ellen as Tom sees no fault in his son and never disciplines him. Brother Remigius, who is opposed to Philip as prior, charges Ellen and Tom with fornication. Waleran, who was cursed by the woman at the hanging, orders Ellen to live apart from Tom. Outraged by Tom's willingness to accept this, Ellen returns to the forest with Jack.

=== Part Two (1136–1137) ===
Philip and Waleran go to King Stephen in the hope of convincing him to give Bartholomew's estates, including a huge limestone quarry, to the church, so that they can be used to pay for the new cathedral's construction. Initially believing that Waleran will be loyal to him as a fellow cleric, Philip learns from the Hamleighs that Waleran intends to use the earldom solely to boost his own position. Realising that the Hamleighs are trying to divide him and Waleran so that they can take the earldom for themselves, Philip secretly conspires with the Hamleighs. They agree that Kingsbridge Priory will be given the quarry and some other lands with the rest of Shiring going to the Hamleighs, but the Hamleighs betray this deal and are given ownership of the quarry with Philip getting rights to, not ownership of, the stone. Furious at being foiled, Waleran vows to never let Philip build his cathedral.

Finding her still living in Shiring Castle, William attacks Aliena and her brother Richard. He mutilates the boy to coerce Aliena into not resisting as he rapes her brutally. This leaves Aliena traumatized. Homeless and destitute, Aliena and Richard travel to Winchester in the hope of receiving compensation from the king, and visit Bartholomew, now dying in prison. The former earl tells them that the king will not help them, and demands they swear an oath to work to regain the earldom. Aliena supports Richard financially by becoming a wealthy wool merchant (by, as described in the book, the hitherto unheard-of act of buying wool from the farmers on their farms and selling it at market rather than the farmers having to travel to market themselves, saving them time and effort) with the help of Philip, who agrees to buy her wool at a fair price when other merchants refuse to do so, and the two siblings settle in Kingsbridge.

The Hamleighs attempt to barricade the quarry against the priory, but Philip foils them by having his quarrymen travel there under the protection of the monks. The Hamleighs' men at arms retreat, fearing damnation if they do violence to the churchmen, leaving the quarry available for Philip's use. In retaliation, the Hamleighs work with Waleran to try to have the cathedral moved to Shiring, thus depriving Philip of the properties tied to it, by claiming that Kingsbridge lacks the resources and manpower to build a cathedral. At the advice of his allies, Philip calls across the county for volunteers to work on the cathedral as penance for their sins. On the day of an inspection by Bishop Henry of Blois that Waleran had arranged, they arrive en masse, and Henry is convinced to not move the cathedral.

=== Part Three (1140–1142) ===
William's father, Percy Hamleigh, dies, and William learns that the earldom will either go to him or Richard, now a knight, since they are both sons of an Earl of Shiring. Prior to the quarry, William destroys a mill and murders a miller in a village in front of Arthur and the townsfolk to provide fear and control of the serfs and villagers. In order to restore his fortunes so that he can raise an army with which to impress King Stephen, William leads an attack on the quarry, which the Hamleighs had unsuccessfully attempted to barricade against Philip, killing and expelling the priory's quarrymen. Philip travels to Lincoln to attempt to persuade King Stephen to redress this outrage, but is interrupted by the Battle of Lincoln, where the king is captured by Robert of Gloucester. Philip is also captured by Robert's forces but is released by his brother Francis, who is chaplain to Robert. Francis gets Philip an audience with the Empress Maud, who grants him a license for a market at Kingsbridge, while William Hamleigh, who has switched sides from Stephen to Maud, is granted sole right to the disputed quarry. Philip, despite the quarry being thus denied him, still manages to pay for stone for his cathedral using the revenues from the market.

Tom befriends Prior Philip and, when Ellen returns, he persuades Philip to allow them to marry. After some time, Alfred proposes to Aliena, but she turns him down. She also strikes up a friendship with Jack, with whom she falls in love, now working as an apprentice mason at Tom's suggestion, but she shuns him after Alfred catches the two of them kissing, being reminded of William's attack on her. The two stepbrothers continue to be at odds, and Alfred later claims that Jack's father was hanged for thieving, starting a fight that leads to damage and a loss of construction materials. Jack is expelled from the cathedral construction, but Philip contrives a new construction overseer position for Jack that he can have, on the condition that he becomes a monk. Jack reluctantly agrees to this, in order to stay in Kingsbridge. Later on, Ellen claims that Jack's father was innocent.

William proves a hapless and merciless lord who mishandles the earldom financially and routinely rapes any peasant woman he wishes. Attempting to restore his fortunes, William leads an attack that burns down Kingsbridge and kills many people including Tom Builder. In the chaos, Aliena's entire stock of wool, in which she had invested all her money, is destroyed in the fire.

=== Part Four (1142–1145) ===
After losing her fortune again, Aliena agrees to marry Alfred if he supports Richard. Jack, who has been confined for continued infringements (largely fraternizing with Aliena) breaks his confinement in an attempt to talk to her, but is ultimately locked in the obedience room of the monastery. The next morning, Ellen breaks into the room, revealing that Jack's father had once been imprisoned there after he was framed for theft by three men. Freed by his mother, Jack and Aliena make love on the morning of her wedding, and he tries to convince her to leave Kingsbridge with him, but she refuses to do anything that would require her to break her vow to support Richard. Jack attempts to persuade Alfred to call off the marriage, but discovers that Alfred plans to marry her solely to keep her from Jack, and intends to mistreat her to further spite him. Ellen curses the wedding, seemingly leaving Alfred impotent, and he and Aliena never consummate their marriage. Jack leaves Kingsbridge to find out about his father.

After years of putting off the decision following the death of Earl Percy Hamleigh, Stephen finally gives the earldom to William. Alfred persuades Philip to replace the wooden roof of the cathedral with a stone vault, but fails to reinforce the structure at the higher levels. This causes the cathedral to collapse during a service, killing many people. Aliena gives birth to a red-headed son, and Alfred abandons her, having realised that the child is Jack's. On Ellen's advice, Aliena leaves with her son to find Jack, and follows evidence of Jack's sculpture through France and Spain, finding him in Paris, where they reconcile. Jack helps to calm a riot at a nearby cathedral using the "Weeping Madonna", a wooden statue of the Virgin Mary he was given by a spice merchant he befriended that appears to weep when taken from a hot place to a cold place. The statue is viewed as a miracle, which Jack leverages for financial support to rebuild the cathedral in Kingsbridge.

As he travels home, Jack makes his way to Cherbourg where he is mistaken for the ghost of his father, Jacques Cherbourg, before meeting his grandmother and other relatives, who reveal that Jacques had supposedly died in the sinking of the White Ship, of which he was a passenger. Returning to Kingsbridge, Jack convinces Philip and the clergy to make him the cathedral's new master-builder, drawing up a new design for the cathedral based on his observations in France and Spain. His relationship with Aliena is discovered by the monks during the negotiations, and Philip orders them apart until Aliena's marriage to Alfred is annulled.

Wanting more information on his father, Jack questions Ellen, who has continuously kept the truth from him out of fear that he would devote himself to a life of revenge against those responsible for his father's death. She implies that the White Ship was sunk deliberately, reveals that the three men who framed Jacques Cherbourg were Percy Hamleigh, Waleran Bigod, and Prior James. After Jack visits Waleran to seek confirmation of Ellen's words, William, jealous of Jack's relationship with Aliena, convinces Waleran to let him attack Kingsbridge again, in order to kill Jack in a way that would avoid drawing attention to his accusations. Richard overhears fighters discussing the attack in another town, and his warning allows the villagers to build a set of town walls and earthen ramparts in about two days, thanks to the expertise of Jack. Fighting from the walls, the townspeople kill many of the attackers and repel William's attack, while making it impossible for him to raid Kingsbridge again. As revenge, William asks Waleran to block Alfred and Aliena's annulment. Though disheartened, Jack and Aliena agree to stay together, living separately (and occasionally making love in the forest) until the day they can marry.

=== Part Five (1152–1155) ===
Many years of famine pass, which are further exacerbated by William's poor leadership. Alfred has left Kingsbridge for Shiring, but following a downturn in business, he returns to Kingsbridge and begs for a job from Jack. William's mother dies, and after he forgets to summon the priest to give her last rites, the guilt-stricken William is persuaded by Waleran to build a cathedral in Shiring for the sake of his mother's soul. They are later aided by Alfred, who brings all of the Kingsbridge workmen to Shiring in return for being in charge of the cathedral's construction after Philip is unable to keep paying them.

Inspired by Aliena, Richard organises the starving peasants who have turned to outlawry into a militia, and goes to war with William, robbing him on multiple occasions. William learns of the location of Richard's forces from Remigius, in return for making the monk the head of Shiring's future chapter, and plans an overwhelming attack to kill all the rebels. When he arrives, he learns from Ellen that Richard's men have left to join the forces of Maud's son, the future Henry II of England, who has invaded the country on the advice of Francis.

Eventually, Stephen agrees to have Henry succeed him. Philip learns that as part of their deal, all properties will revert to the owners who held them prior to Stephen's reign, thus making Richard the official earl, but Stephen will not have to force the handovers, meaning that Richard might not gain the earldom until Stephen's death. With the help of William's young wife, who loathes him, Aliena is able to allow Richard to capture the earldom's castle before Henry and Stephen's treaty can be made official and the King's Peace restored. William returns to the village of Hamleigh, and Waleran proposes to sell him the position of sheriff of Shiring so that he can oppose Richard and keep funding the cathedral. Remigius is abandoned by the two of them during this time, but Philip forgives him for his treachery and allows him to return to the priory.

Richard refuses to grant the priory access to the quarry, on the basis that it was once part of the earldom. After Aliena calls him out for his ingratitude towards Philip, she is attacked and nearly raped by Alfred, who is out of work again after Shiring Cathedral is abandoned. Richard arrives and kills Alfred in the ensuing fight with Aliena's assistance. Seeing a chance to regain the earldom, William obtains a warrant to arrest Richard for murder on the king's behalf. Realising that Richard has no chance of a fair trial due to the attitudes towards marital rape of the time period and the hostility of both William and Stephen towards him, Philip proposes that Richard, who is more suited to be a soldier than an earl, fight in the Crusades as penance for killing Alfred; William would be unable to arrest him, and Aliena would be allowed to look after her brother's lands, therefore giving the earldom both a competent ruler and one willing to cooperate with the priory. Aliena and Jack marry within the new cathedral.

=== Part Six (1170–1174) ===
After many years, Kingsbridge cathedral is completed. Waleran still seeks to ruin Philip, and accuses him of fornication by claiming that Jonathan, now a well liked and committed monk, is Philip's son. With Philip's conviction certain due to a lack of evidence proving his innocence, Jack and Jonathan attempt to figure out the identity of the latter's father, both being unaware that he is Tom's son. They discover the truth when Jonathan recalls that he had been found near the monastery cell that Philip once ran, a fact that had previously been unknown to Jack, who then remembers seeing the baby Jonathan lying on his mother's grave. The two of them manage to convince Ellen, who has remained bitter towards Philip for his role in splitting up her and Tom, to testify on his behalf.

At Philip's trial, Ellen's testimony saves him from being convicted. Regardless, Waleran accuses Ellen of perjury, and she exposes his own perjury in the framing of Jacques Cherbourg, revealing that Waleran and the others had been bribed to dispose of him. Remigius confirms her testimony, having heard Prior James confess to his perjury shortly before the latter's death. He explains that James's misrule of the Priory had been the result of the guilt he felt for his part in the conspiracy, and admits that he had sought to become Prior to repair the damage, before admitting that Philip was better suited for the task. Waleran ultimately loses his position as bishop of Kingsbridge as a result of the revelations.

Later on, William and Waleran become involved with the plot to assassinate Thomas Becket, the Archbishop of Canterbury, in order to protect their now crumbling positions of power. William leads the attack, and despite the efforts of Philip, who had traveled to Canterbury to meet with Becket, the archbishop is brutally murdered. Upon seeing the distraught congregation, Philip is inspired to treat Becket's death as a martyrdom, and urges the assembled people to spread word of the murder across Christendom. With King Henry refusing to defend Becket's killers, William is subsequently convicted of sacrilege by the efforts of both Philip and Tommy, the son of Jack and Aliena, and hanged.

At Kingsbridge, Jack meets with a ruined and repentant Waleran, now living as a monk in the priory, to learn why his father was framed. The former bishop explains that a group of barons had arranged the sinking of the White Ship in order to kill the king's son and heir, with the belief that they would be able to influence the succession and gain more independence from the crown as a result. After they learned that Jacques Cherbourg had survived the sinking, the barons had him imprisoned in England to prevent him from exposing their conspiracy. While initially content to leave him there, they eventually chose to have him killed after he learned English and started attracting unwanted attention, hiring Waleran, Percy, and James for this end. Finally understanding the truth behind his father's death, Jack is able to put it behind him. Elsewhere, the Pope forces King Henry's public repentance and symbolic subjugation of the crown to the church, in which Philip, now Bishop of Kingsbridge, participates. In this final scene, Philip muses that the affair has proven the limitations of Royal power; the King could order Becket killed, but faced with the massive popular reaction he had to bow down and let himself be humiliated.

== Characters ==
- Jack Jackson (also known as Jack Builder): Son of Jack Shareburg (Jacques Cherbourg) and Ellen; he becomes an architect and skilled stonemason.
- Ellen: Daughter of a knight. She was unusual in being literate in English, French and Latin. The lover of Jack Shareburg and the mother of Jack Jackson, she meets Tom while living in the woods.
- Tom Builder: A builder whose lifelong dream is to build a cathedral.
- Alfred Builder: Tom's son, a mason who later marries Aliena, but abandons her after she gives birth to Jack's child.
- Martha: Daughter of Tom, sister to Alfred and Jonathan and stepsister to Jack.
- Prior Philip: A monk who dreams of Kingsbridge rising to greatness with a cathedral. Brother of Francis.
- Bishop Waleran Bigod: An ambitious and corrupt cleric constantly scheming his way to more power.
- Aliena: Daughter to Bartholomew, the original Earl of Shiring, and the planned bride of William Hamleigh.
- Richard (of Kingsbridge): Aliena's younger brother, a knight who becomes a skilled soldier and leader, who relies on Aliena's revenues from her wool business.
- William Hamleigh: The son of a minor lord, he temporarily gains the earldom of Shiring but eventually loses it to Richard, the son of the former earl, Bartholomew.
- Percy Hamleigh, later Earl of Shiring: Father of William, he ousts the rebel Earl Bartholomew and gains control of the earldom.
- Regan Hamleigh, later Countess of Shiring: Wife of Percy and William's ambitious mother.

=== Minor characters ===
- Francis of Gwynedd: Philip's brother, orphaned with him in Wales and raised by monks; became a secular priest with royal connections.
- Bartholomew, Earl of Shiring: Father of Aliena and Richard, he earns the enmity of the Hamleighs and is jailed for treason.
- Remigius: The former Sub-Prior of Kingsbridge who tries to secure the position of Prior. Primarily motivated by envy and spite.
- Cuthbert Whitehead: Kingsbridge Priory's cellarer. An early ally of Philip after his arrival in Kingsbridge.
- Milius Bursar: Kingsbridge Priory's bursar, he is an early ally of Philip.
- Johnny Eightpence: A gentle, simpleminded monk who cares for baby Jonathan.
- Jack Shareburg (Jacques Cherbourg): A jongleur who survives the wreck of the White Ship and becomes the lover of Ellen and father of Jack Jackson; executed.
- Agnes: First wife of Tom Builder and mother of Martha, Alfred and Jonathan.
- Jonathan: Son of Tom and Agnes, he was raised from infancy by Prior Philip.
- Tommy (later called Thomas): Son of Jack and Aliena. With a talent for administration and command, he becomes the Earl of Shiring. He reluctantly oversees William Hamleigh's hanging.
- Sally: Daughter of Jack and Aliena. She becomes a stained glass artisan working on the Kingsbridge Cathedral.
- Raschid Alharoun: Jack's friend in Toledo, a Christian Arab merchant who introduces him to the scholarly world.
- Walter: William Hamleigh's groom/squire. Accompanies him through much of the novel.
- Elizabeth: Betrothed to William Hamleigh, she is beaten by him on their wedding night. Later befriended by Aliena and surrenders the keep to Richard's forces.
- Peter of Wareham: Philip's enemy, later fights for the post of bishop of Kingsbridge.

== Historical accuracy ==
- Many people in the book are reported as having breakfast, though there is some debate on whether people in those times ate breakfast at all.

== Adaptations ==
=== Board games ===
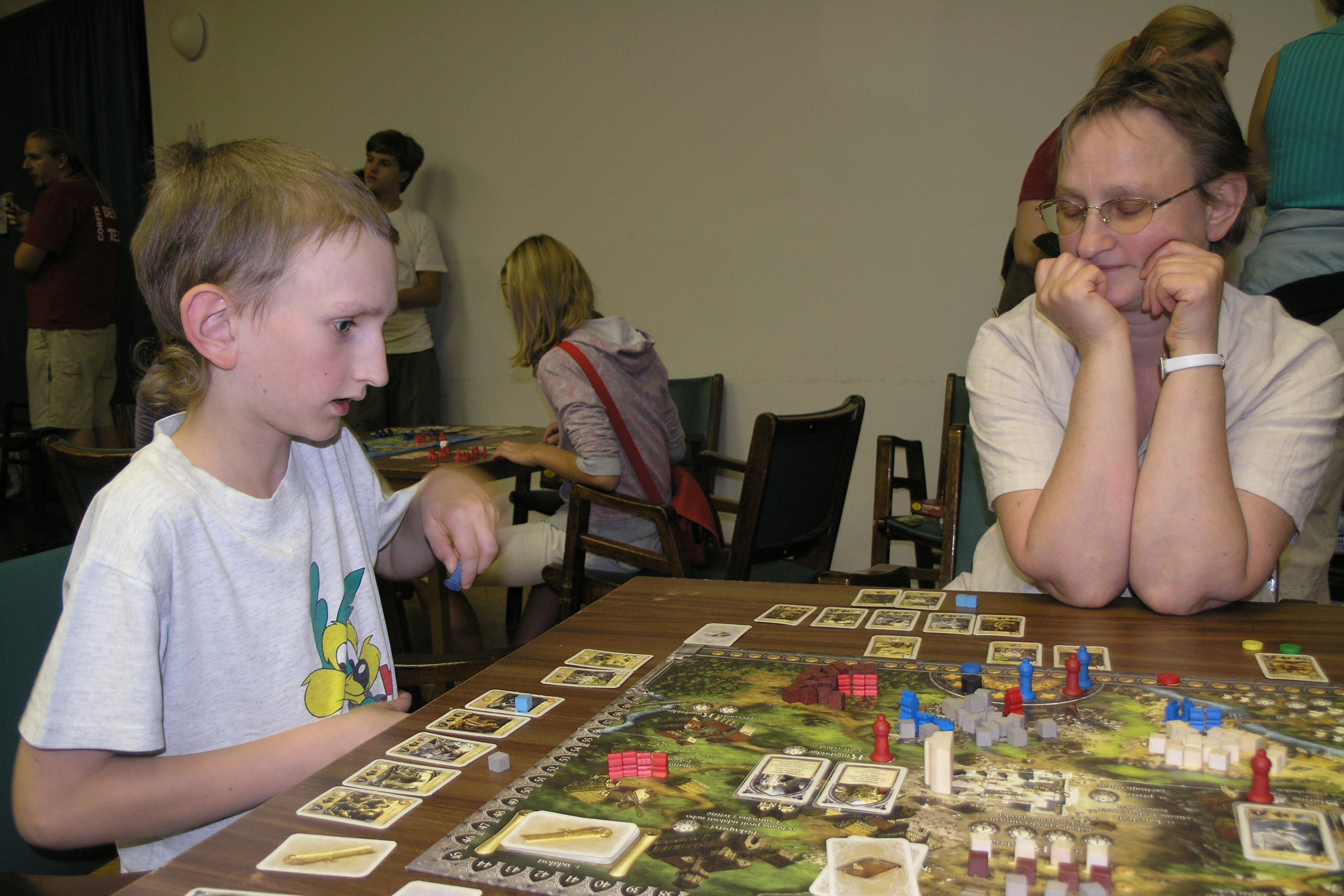
Board game by Michael Rieneck and Stefan Stadler

Three separate board games have been developed that are based on The Pillars of the Earth:

- A German-style board game by Michael Rieneck and Stefan Stadler was published in 2006 by Kosmos and released at the Spiel game fair as Die Säulen der Erde. The game sold out long before the fair ended. It has been awarded the 2007 Deutscher Spiele Preis, the Spanish "Game of the Year 2007" and the Norwegian "Best Family Game of 2007" and the GAMES Magazine Game of the Year 2007.
- A 2-player game was published by Kosmos in Germany and reprinted in the US as Pillars of the Earth: Builder's Duel.
- A trivia game, attributed to E. Follett, was first published in 2008 by the British publisher Sophisticated Games.

=== Television adaptation ===
A German-Canadian co-production was developed by the Munich-based Tandem Communications and Montreal-based Muse Entertainment, in association with Ridley Scott's Scott Free Films, to adapt the novel for a television movie. It premiered on 23 July 2010 in Canada on The Movie Network/Movie Central and in the United States on Starz. Its UK premiere was in October 2010 on Channel 4. The Australian premiere was 9 December 2012 on ABC1.

=== Musical adaptations ===
The Pillars of the Earth musical in 2025 in Zaragoza, Spain.

In 2016, a Danish-language musical adaptation of The Pillars of the Earth was performed at Østre Gasværk Teater, Copenhagen under the name Jordens Søjler. A reworked edition of the musical opened on 18 October 2025 at Jysk Musikteater, Silkeborg.

In 2019, a Spanish-language musical adaption of The Pillars of the Earth was announced, composed by Iván Macías and adapted by Félix Amador. The production was set to open October 2020, but due to the COVID-19 pandemic, the adaptation opened four years later, November 2024, at Teatro EDP Gran Vía, Madrid. The musical was produced by Dario Regattieri and directed by Federico Barrios and Ignasi Vidal. Teresa Ferrer and Cristina Picos alternated in portraying Aliena, and Javier Ariano starred as Jack.

After being in Bilbao and in Zaragoza on 20 November 2025, it started the second year in Madrid, with Alba Cuartero and Jana Gómez alternating as Aliena, and Rodrigo Blanco as Jack.

=== Video game ===
Game developer and publisher Daedalic Entertainment released an adventure game based on The Pillars of the Earth on 16 August 2017.

== See also ==
- The Spire, a 1964 novel by the English author William Golding telling the story of a dean obsessed with building a 404-foot high spire
- The Heaven Tree: first novel in a 1960 historical trilogy by Edith Pargeter, set during the reign of King John and telling of the efforts of a stonemason to build a church on the Welsh border.
- Cathedral of the Sea: 2006 novel by Ildefonso Falcones set in medieval Spain.
