= El Llac =

el Llac
- Singular population entity
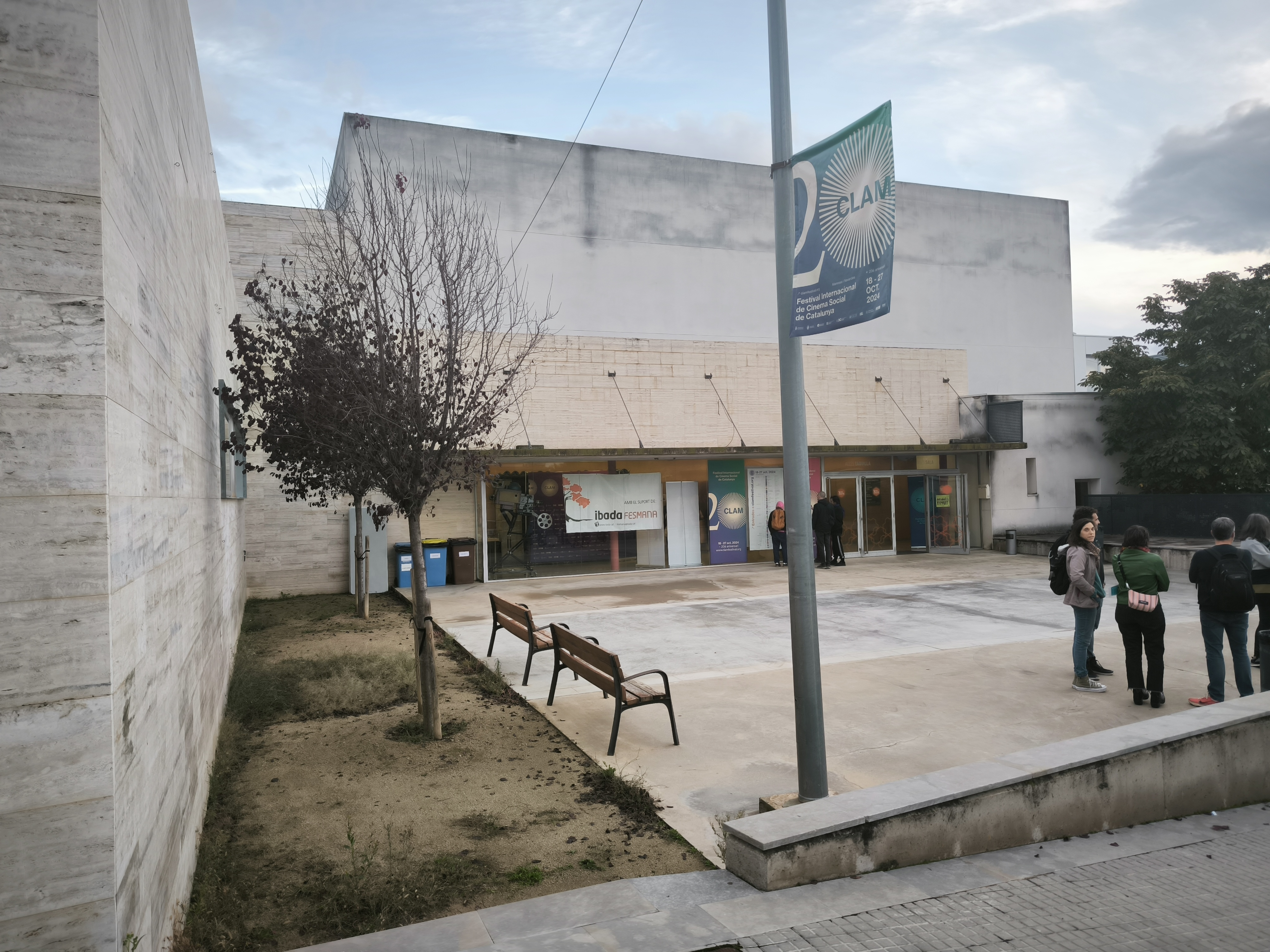
- Theatre Agustí Soler i Mas

- Location within Spain Location within Catalonia Location within Province of Barcelona
- Coordinates: 41°45′27.7″N 1°54′17.1″E
- Country: Spain
- A. community: Catalunya
- Province: Barcelona
- Municipality: Navarcles

Population (January 1, 2024)
  - Total: 184
- Time zone: UTC+01:00
- Postal code: 08270
- MCN: 08140000300

el Llac is a singular population entity in the municipality of Navarcles, in Catalonia, Spain.

As of 2024 it has a population of 184 people.
