= El Galobard =

el Galobard
- Singular population entity
- Location within Spain Location within Catalonia Location within Province of Barcelona
- Coordinates: 41°45′49.3″N 1°54′31.8″E
- Country: Spain
- A. community: Catalunya
- Province: Barcelona
- Municipality: Navarcles

Population (January 1, 2024)
  - Total: 4
- Time zone: UTC+01:00
- Postal code: 08270
- MCN: 08140000200

el Galobard is a singular population entity in the municipality of Navarcles, in Catalonia, Spain.

As of 2024 it has a population of 4 people.
