= La Planota =

la Planota
- Singular population entity
- Location within Spain Location within Catalonia Location within Province of Barcelona
- Coordinates: 41°45′25.8″N 1°54′02.3″E
- Country: Spain
- A. community: Catalunya
- Province: Barcelona
- Municipality: Navarcles

Population (January 1, 2024)
  - Total: 152
- Time zone: UTC+01:00
- Postal code: 08270
- MCN: 08140000400

la Planota is a singular population entity in the municipality of Navarcles, in Catalonia, Spain.

As of 2024 it has a population of 152 people.
