= Jean Gimpel =

French historian and medievalist

Jean Gimpel (10 October 1918 – 15 June 1996) was a French historian and medievalist.

Gimpel was one of three sons of a French father, the art dealer René Gimpel, and an English mother, Florence, the youngest sister of Lord Duveen. Gimpel was brought up in luxury in a house in the Bois de Boulogne, though he went on to be educated in both France and Britain. He made his living as a diamond broker before establishing himself as a critic of the concept of the great artist.

During the Second World War Gimpel served in the French Resistance, for which he was awarded the Croix de Guerre, the Resistance Medal, and the Legion of Honour.

In 1987 Gimpel became a founding vice-president of the Society for the History of Mediaeval Technology and Science, the British affiliate of AVISTA, and the Association de Villard de Honnecourt. Gimpel believed that the basis of sustainable development in the developing world should be low-tech mediaeval machines that could be built, maintained, repaired, and replaced using local craftsmen and resources. He was also a founder of Models for Rural Development, part of the appropriate technology movement.

Gimpel and his wife Catherine maintained a salon in London in his later years.

== Works ==
The Medieval Machine

Gimpel's published works include:

- The Medieval Machine: The Industrial Revolution of the Middle Ages (originally published in French as La Révolution industrielle du Moyen Âge, Éditions du Seuil, 1975; published in English by Victor Gollancz, 1976; 2nd edition Wildwood House, 1988)
- The Cathedral Builders (originally published in French as Les Bâtisseurs de cathédrales, Éditions du Seuil, 1958; published in English by Grove Press, 1961, translated by Carl F. Barnes, Jr.; reprinted, 1983, translated by Teresa Waugh)
- The Cult of Art: Against Art and Artists (originally published as Contre l'art et les artistes, Éditions du Seuil, 1969; published in English by Weidenfeld & Nicolson and by Stein & Day, 1969)
- The End of the Future: The Waning of the High-Tech World (originally published as La Fin de l'avenir: Le déclin technologique et la crise de l'Occident, Éditions du Seuil, 1992; published in English by the Adamantine Press in 1995, translated by Helen McPhail)

Novelist Ken Follett wrote that he was inspired and informed by Gimpel's work and later retained him as a consultant while writing The Pillars of the Earth.
