= Berenguer de Montagut =

Catalan architect, master builder on Santa Maria del Mar

Berenguer de Montagut (active during the second half of the 14th century) was a Catalan architect, master builder on Santa Maria del Mar.

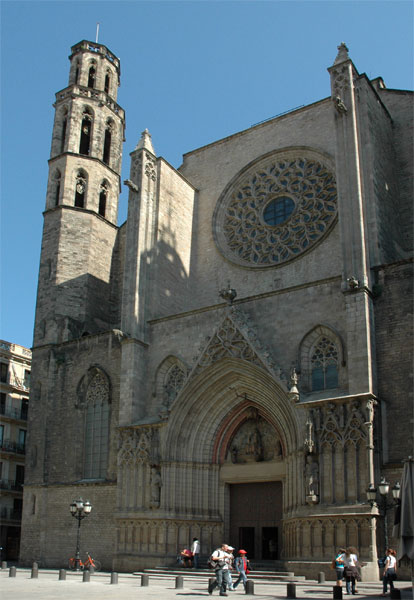
Santa Maria del Mar

Little is known about Berenguer de Montagut's life. He is currently linked with three religious buildings in Catalonia and the Balearic Islands, for which it seems clear that he was the designer and master builder during parts of their respective constructions: Santa Maria de l'Aurora in Manresa (the Manresa Cathedral), Santa Maria del Mar in Barcelona and the Cathedral of Mallorca. On occasions he has also been linked with the church of Santa Maria del Pi in Barcelona.

Berenguer served as lieutenant to the governors of Mallorca during the 1390s, including twice under Ramon d'Abella.

== In popular culture ==
Berenguer is portrayed by actor Fernando Sendino in the Spanish television series, Cathedral of the Sea (2018).
