= Directorium Inquisitorum =

1376 book by Nicholas Eymerich

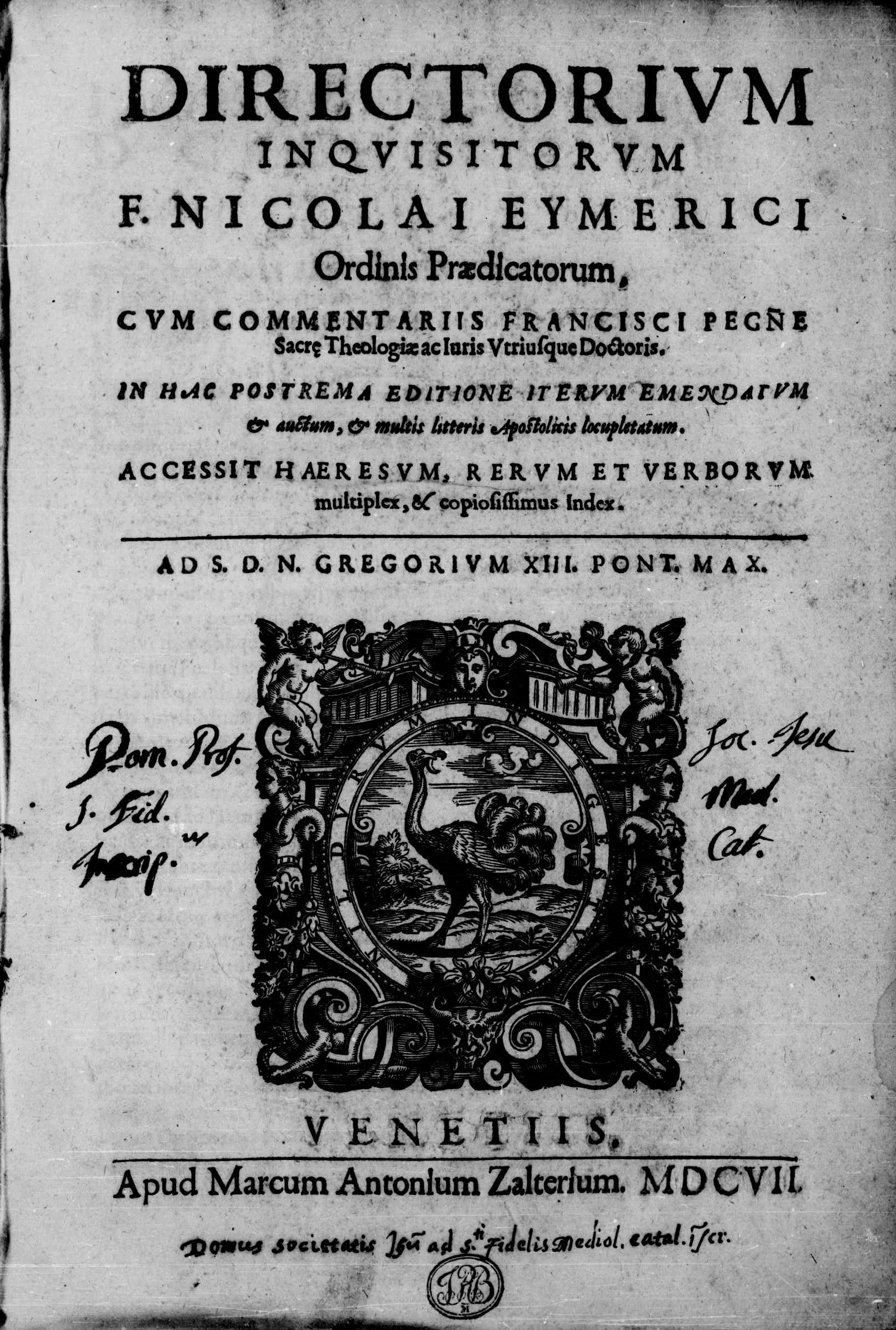
- 1607 edition printed in Venice
- Author: Nicholas Eymerich
- Language: Latin
- Publication date: c. 1376
- Publication place: Spain

The Directorium Inquisitorum is Nicholas Eymerich's most prominent and enduring work, written in Latin and consisting of approximately 800 pages, which he had composed as early as 1376. Eymerich had written an earlier treatise on sorcery, perhaps as early as 1359, which he extensively reworked into the Directorium Inqusitorum. In compiling the book, Eymerich used many of the magic texts he had previously confiscated from accused sorcerers. It can also be considered as an assessment of a century and a half of official Inquisition in the "Albigensian" country.

== Subject matter ==
The Dominican friar Nicholas Eymerich was appointed Inquisitor General of Aragon in 1357. As he directed much of his efforts to the apparent errors of members of the clergy, he often found his investigations blocked by the court, curia, or papacy. King Peter IV of Aragon had him removed from office at the general chapter held at Perpignan in 1360.

In lieu of being elected the Vicar General of the Dominicans in Aragon in 1362 however, Eymerich was again Inquisitor General. For a time King Peter IV of Aragon prevented Eymerich from serving as inquisitor. Finally, in 1376, Peter drove Eymerich from the kingdom, and Eymerich fled to the papal court of Pope Gregory XI in Avignon. There he wrote the Directorium Inquisitorum. It was further amplified by Spanish canonist Francis Peña in 1578. According to Karen Sullivan, they viewed the accused "as a soul deciding for itself whether it is to be united with God or forever alienated from him".

Eymerich appears to have been familiar with Bernard Gui's earlier Liber sententiarum and other inquisitorial treatises. The Directorium Inquisitorum includes definitions of various types of heresies, discussion of questions of jurisdiction, and proper trial procedure. The book was used as a manual for inquisitors, and gave practical advice on how to conduct inquiries. It also described various means an accused heretic might use to dissemble, such as equivocation or the pretense of insanity.

Witchcraft, which was a marginal issue for early inquisitors, assumed more importance in the later edition. On the subject of magic, it discusses various types and techniques of divination and draws a distinction between practices deemed heretical and non-heretical.

He quotes Pope Innocent V in saying that in order to receive aid from a demon, a person must enter into some form of pact with the demon. Eymerich then extrapolates on this postulate to demonstrate that any agreement with a demon is a heresy. Eymerich was among the first to condemn all forms of demonic conjuration as heresy. Previously, the common belief had been that even a saint might make a demonic pact as exemplified by the story of Saint Theophilus, who made a pact with the devil to gain an ecclesiastical position.

In addition to describing common magical practices, Eymerich also described means of extracting a confession which included primitive psychological manipulation as well as outright torture. Regarding torture, Eymerich said "Quaestiones sunt fallaces et inefficaces", meaning 'Torture is deceptive and ineffectual'. However, Eymerich was the first inquisitor to get around the Church's prohibition against torturing a subject twice. He interpreted the directive very liberally, permitting a separate instance of torture for a separate charge of heresy.

== Legacy ==
The Directorium Inquisitorum was to become the definitive handbook of procedure for the Spanish Inquisition until into the seventeenth century. It saw numerous printings, including a run at Barcelona in 1503 and one in Rome in 1578. The Directorium Inquisitorum was one of the primary forerunners of the better known Malleus Maleficarum.
