= Cathedral of the Sea =

2006 historical novel by Ildefonso Falcones

- First edition
- Author: Ildefonso Falcones
- Original title: La catedral del mar
- Language: Spanish; Catalan
- Genre: Historical
- Publisher: Grijalbo-Mondadori
- Publication date: 2006
- Publication place: Spain
- Pages: 672
- ISBN: 978-84-253-4003-1

Cathedral of the Sea (Spanish: La catedral del mar) is a 2006 historical novel by Spanish author Ildefonso Falcones. The action takes place in 14th century Barcelona at the height of the city's trade and military power in the Mediterranean, during the construction of Santa Maria del Mar serving as background to the story.

In 2018, a high-budget drama series adaptation by Atresmedia was broadcast in Antena 3 from 23 May 2018 to 18 July 2018. Netflix released the series worldwide on 1 September 2018.

== Plot ==
The story is set in fourteenth century Barcelona under the Crown of Aragon and follows the life of Arnau Estanyol, set against the historical background of the construction of the Santa Maria del Mar church. The narrative employs classic structural dichotomies, contrasting the struggles of the common people against the abuses of the ruling feudal elite.

=== Fugitives in Barcelona (1319 to 1329) ===
In 1319, Bernat Estanyol, a humble rural serf in Navarcles, is driven to desperation after his cruel feudal lord exercises the abusive jus primae noctis (right of the first night) on Bernat's wedding night, subsequently tearing his family apart. To save his infant son, Arnau, Bernat flees the feudal lands to the free city of Barcelona. Under medieval Catalan law, any serf who manages to live as a free citizen in Barcelona for a year and a day officially earns their freedom.

They seek shelter with Bernat's sister, Guiamona, and her wealthy husband, Grau Puig, a successful potter. Despite obtaining their freedom, Bernat and Arnau are treated as second class servants by the Puig family. During these difficult years, Bernat adopts an orphaned boy named Joan (Joanet), who becomes a brother to Arnau.

=== The Bastaixos and Tragedy (1329 to 1343) ===
As a young boy, Arnau is transfixed by the building of the Santa Maria del Mar church in the La Ribera district. Naively adopting the Virgin Mary as his substitute mother to replace the mother he lost, Arnau feels a deep connection to the cathedral.

When a severe famine strikes Barcelona, Bernat is executed by hanging for participating in a desperate food riot against noble grain hoarders. Left to fend for himself, Arnau finds solace by joining the ancient guild of the bastaixos (the port workmen who voluntarily carry massive stone blocks on their backs from the royal quarries of Montjuïc to the construction site of the cathedral). Meanwhile, Joan is sent to study for the priesthood under the tutelage of the church.

=== Rise to Wealth and Nobility (1343 to 1356) ===
As he grows into manhood, Arnau transitions from a stone carrier to an apprentice money changer under the guidance of Sahat, a Moorish slave whose freedom he later secures. Arnau's sharp intellect and honesty make him incredibly wealthy, and he eventually uses his fortune to buy up the debts of the Puig family, driving them out of the city in ruin.

When a Castilian military fleet attacks the Barcelona harbor, Arnau executes a daring strategy by blocking the port, saving the city from invasion. In deep gratitude, King Peter IV of Aragon elevates him to the nobility, granting him the title of Baron of Granollers. However, this title comes at a cost: the King forces Arnau into a cold, political marriage with a calculating noblewoman, Elionor, separating him from his beloved adopted daughter, Mar.

=== The Inquisition and Consecration (1356 to 1384) ===
Arnau's rapid rise and his progressive policies (such as freeing and protecting the serfs on his newly acquired feudal estates) provoke bitter resentment among the traditional nobility. His wife, Elionor, conspires with his old enemies to orchestrate his downfall.

They frame Arnau before the Inquisition on charges of heresy and having illicit relations with a Jewish woman. To his horror, Joan (who has matured into a fanatical Inquisitor) unwittingly aids the conspiracy against his adoptive brother.

In the climax, the common people of Barcelona, led by his loyal fellow bastaixos, launch a massive riot to free Arnau from prison. Cleared of his charges and reunited with Mar, Arnau lives to witness the official consecration of the finished Santa Maria del Mar cathedral (a physical testament to his lifelong journey from slavery to freedom).

== Awards ==
The novel has won several literary awards including:

- Euskadi de Plata 2006 (Spain)
- The Qué Leer Award (Spain)
- Giovanni Boccaccio Award 2007 (Italy)
