= Santa Maria del Mar, Barcelona =

Santa Maria del Mar
- Basílica de Santa Maria del Mar
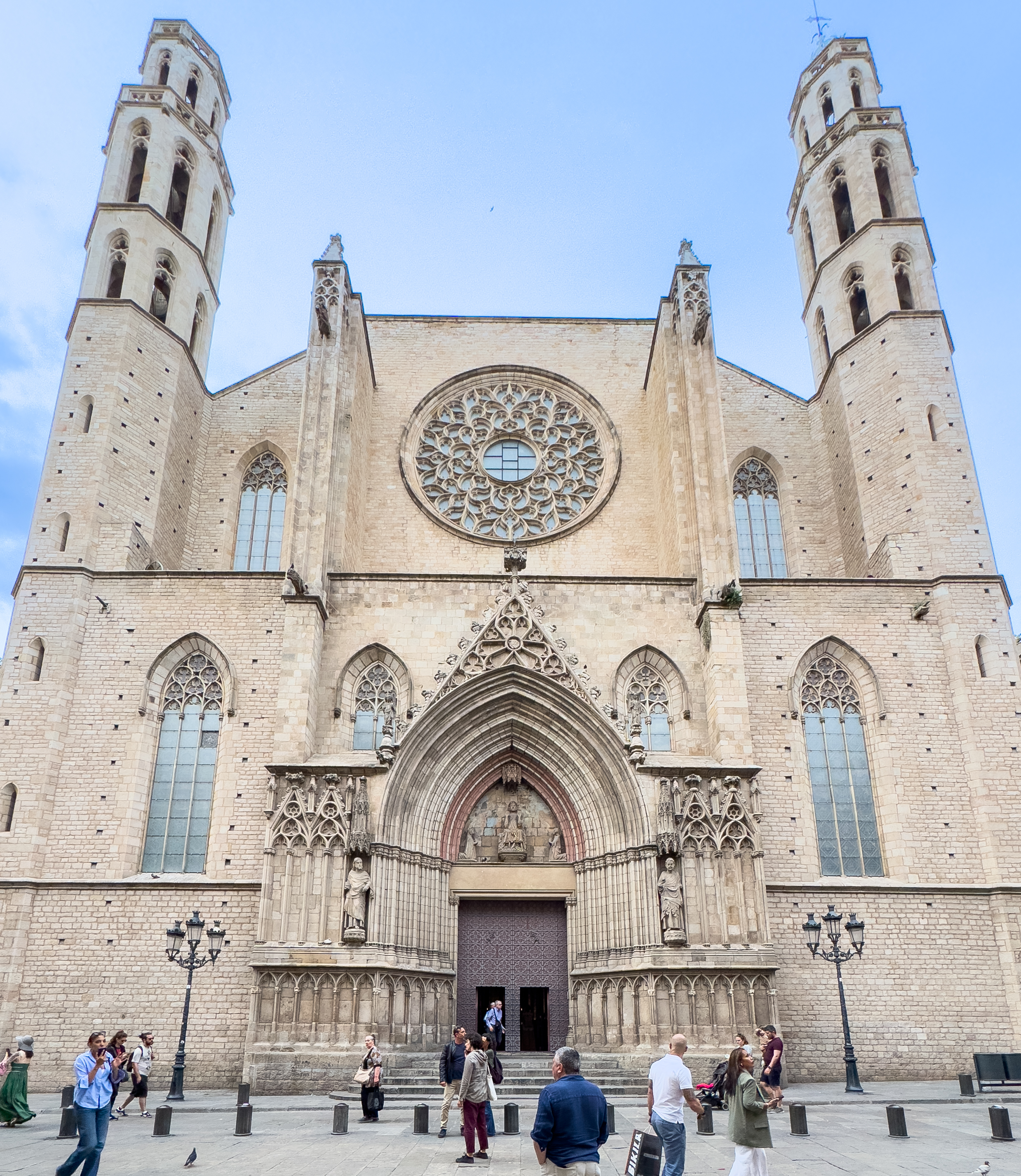
- The west end of the church

- Location Santa María del Mar in Barcelona Location in Spain
- 41°23′01″N 2°10′55″E
- Location: Barcelona
- Country: Spain
- Denomination: Roman Catholic
- Website: www.santamariadelmarbarcelona.org

History
- Dedication: Saint Mary
- Consecrated: 1384

Architecture
- Heritage designation: Bien de Interés Cultural
- Architectural type: Catalan Gothic
- Years built: 1329–1384

Administration
- Archdiocese: Barcelona

Santa Maria del Mar (Catalan pronunciation: [ˈsantə məˈɾi.ə ðəl ˈmaɾ], "Saint Mary of the Sea") is a church in the Ribera district of Barcelona, Catalonia, Spain, built between 1329 and 1383 at the height of Principality of Catalonia's maritime and mercantile preeminence. It is an outstanding example of Catalan Gothic, with a purity and unity of style that is very unusual in large medieval buildings.

== History ==
The first mention of a church of Santa Maria by the Sea dates from 998. The construction of the present building was promoted by the canon Bernat Llull, who was appointed Archdean of Santa Maria in 1324. One of the distinctive features of Santa Maria del Mar was its backing by the common people, as opposed to the nobility. Construction work started on 25 March 1329, when the foundation stone was laid by king Alfonso IV of Aragon as commemorated by a tablet in Latin and Catalan on the façade that faces the Fossar de les Moreres. The architects in charge were Berenguer de Montagut (designer of the building) and Ramon Despuig, and during the construction all the guilds of the Ribera quarter were involved. The walls, the side chapels and the façades were finished by 1350. In 1379 there was a fire that damaged important parts of the works. Finally, on 3 November 1383 the last stone was laid and on 15 August 1384 the church was consecrated.

The 1428 Catalonia earthquake caused several casualties and destroyed the rose window in the west end. The new rose window, in the Flamboyant style, was finished by 1459 and one year later the glass was added. The chapel of the Blessed Sacrament, adjacent to the apse, was added in the 19th century.

Many of its decorative richness, the images and the Baroque altar were destroyed in a fire set by anti-clerical rioters at the beginning of the Spanish Civil War in 1936. The church survived even though it was on fire for 11 days. Renovations following this fire began in 1938, but the damaged windows weren't replaced until the 1960s. Funds for these repairs were low, so a fundraising campaign was started. Futbol Club Barcelona was asked to contribute, and they agreed only if their coat of arms would appear on one of the stained glass windows.

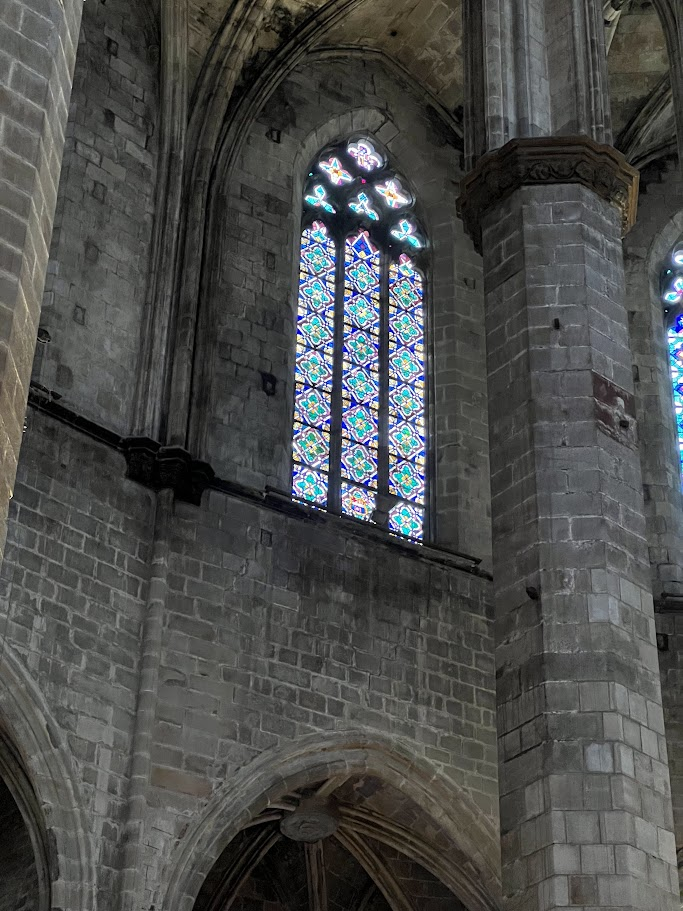
The FC Barcelona logo can be seen at the bottom of one of the stained glass windows to the left of the altar.

== Exterior ==
From the outside, Santa Maria gives an impression of massive severity that belies the interior. It is hemmed in by the narrow streets of the Ribera, making it difficult to obtain an overall impression, except from the Fossar de les Moreres and the Plaça de Santa Maria, both of them former burial grounds. The latter is dominated by the west end of the church with its rose window. Images of Saint Peter and Saint Paul occupy niches on either side of the west door, and the tympanum shows the Saviour flanked by Our Lady and Saint John.

The north-west tower was completed in 1496, but its companion was not finished until 1902.

== Interior ==
In contrast with the exterior, the interior gives an impression of light and spaciousness. It is of the basilica type, with its three aisles forming a single space with no transepts and no architectural boundary between nave and presbytery. The simple ribbed vault is supported on slender octagonal columns, and abundant daylight streams in through the tall clerestorey windows.

The interior is almost devoid of imagery of the sort to be found in Barcelona's other large Gothic churches, the cathedral and Santa Maria del Pi, after the fire which occurred in 1936 during anticlerical disturbances. Amongst the most notable of the works destroyed at that time was the Baroque retable by Deodat Casanoves and Salvador Gurri.

Some interesting stained-glass windows have survived from various periods.

The spacing of the columns is the widest of any Gothic church in Europe—about forty-three feet apart, center to center.

== Proportions ==
According to the art historian Josep Bracons, the basic unit of measurement used in Santa Maria del Mar was the mediaeval foot of 33 centimetres. Measured in this way, the side chapels are 10 feet deep, the width of the side aisles is double this, while the central aisle is four times as wide, that is, 40 feet. The total width of the church is thus 100 medieval feet, which is also equal to the maximum height of the building.

== In popular culture ==
- The construction of Santa Maria del Mar is the background for the best-selling novel La catedral del mar (Cathedral of the Sea), by Ildefonso Falcones (2006) which was subsequently adapted into a Netflix series in 2018
- The Corpus Christi Procession Leaving the Church of Santa Maria del Mar by Ramon Casas

== Gallery ==
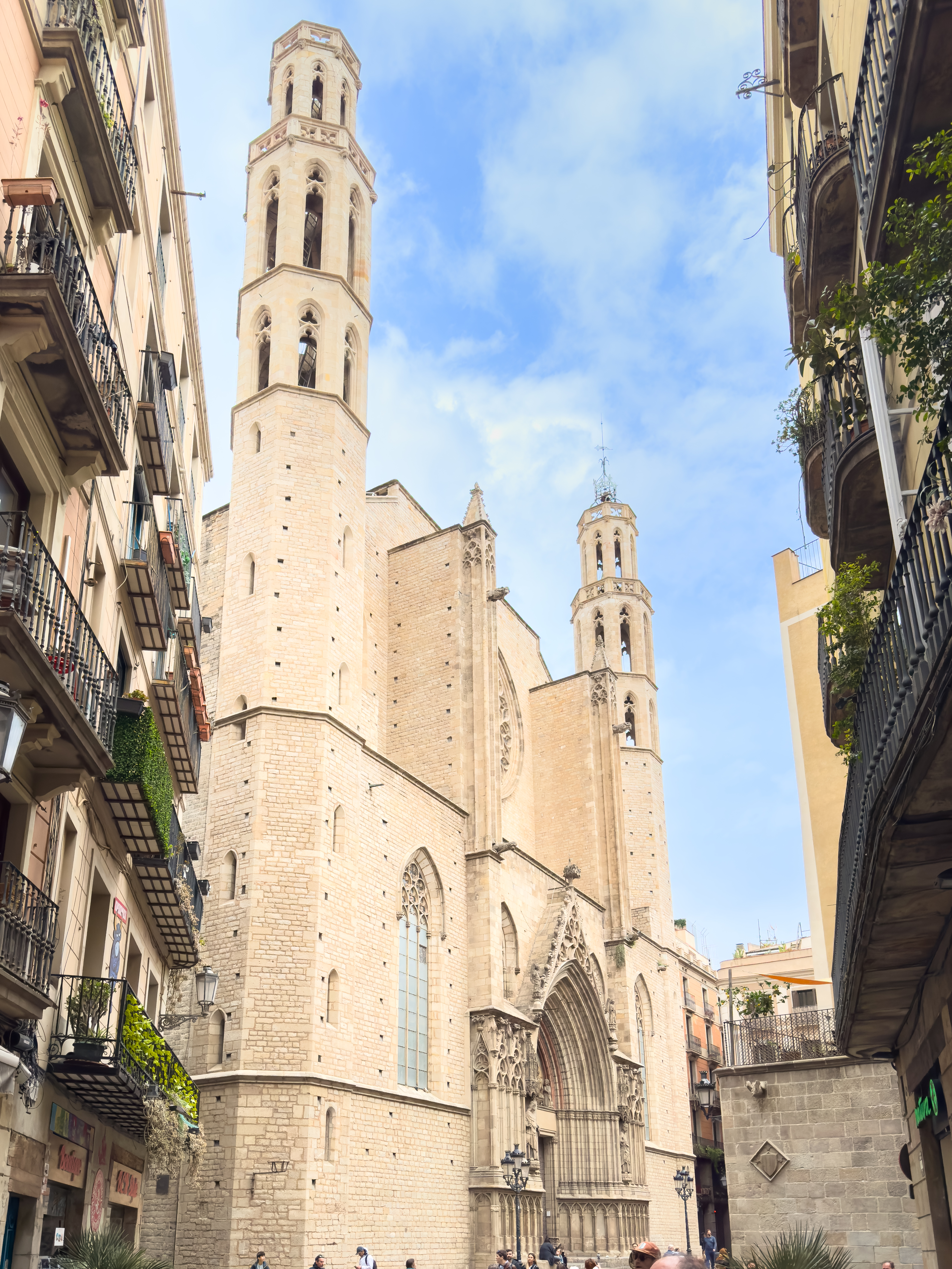

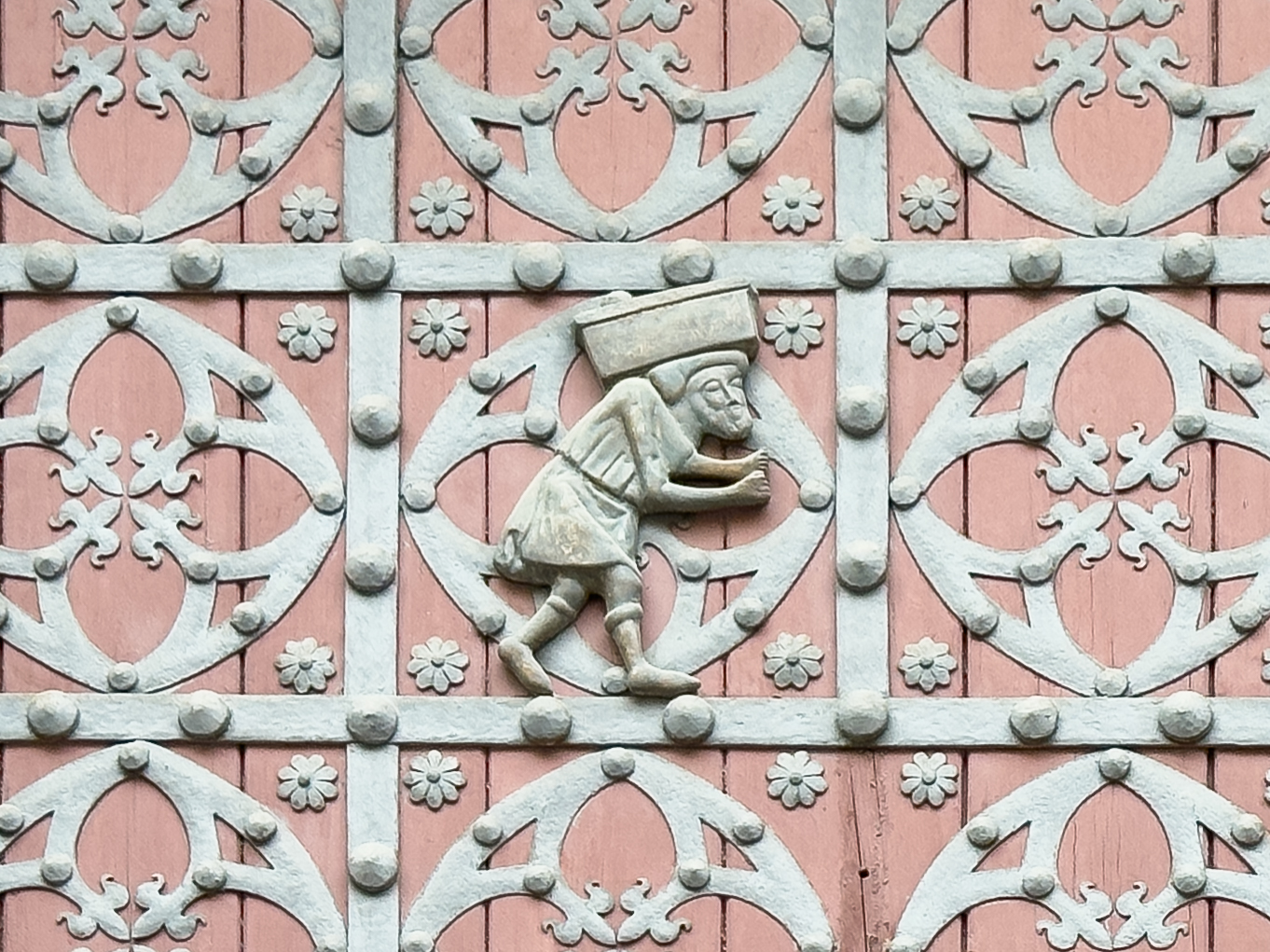

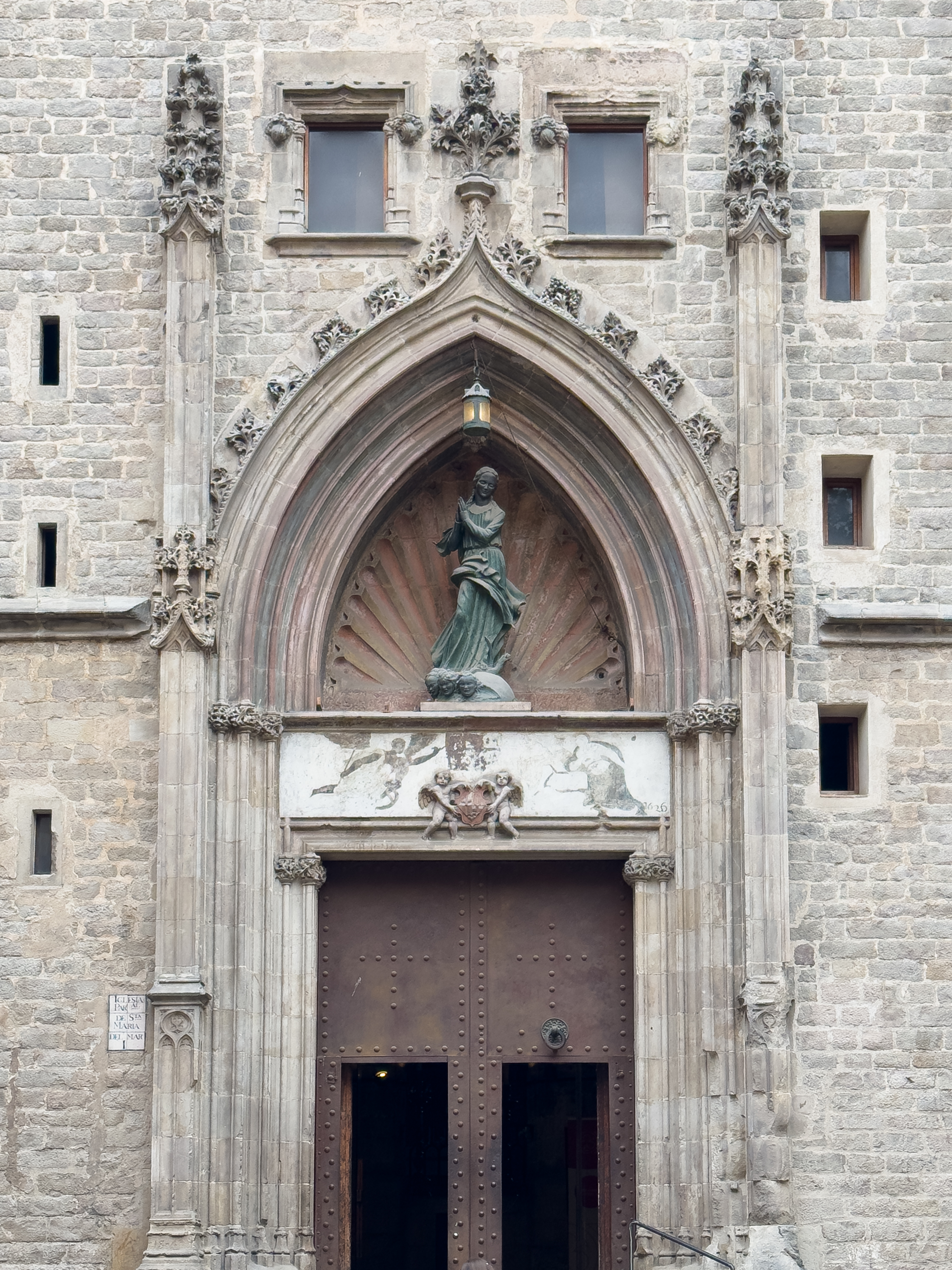

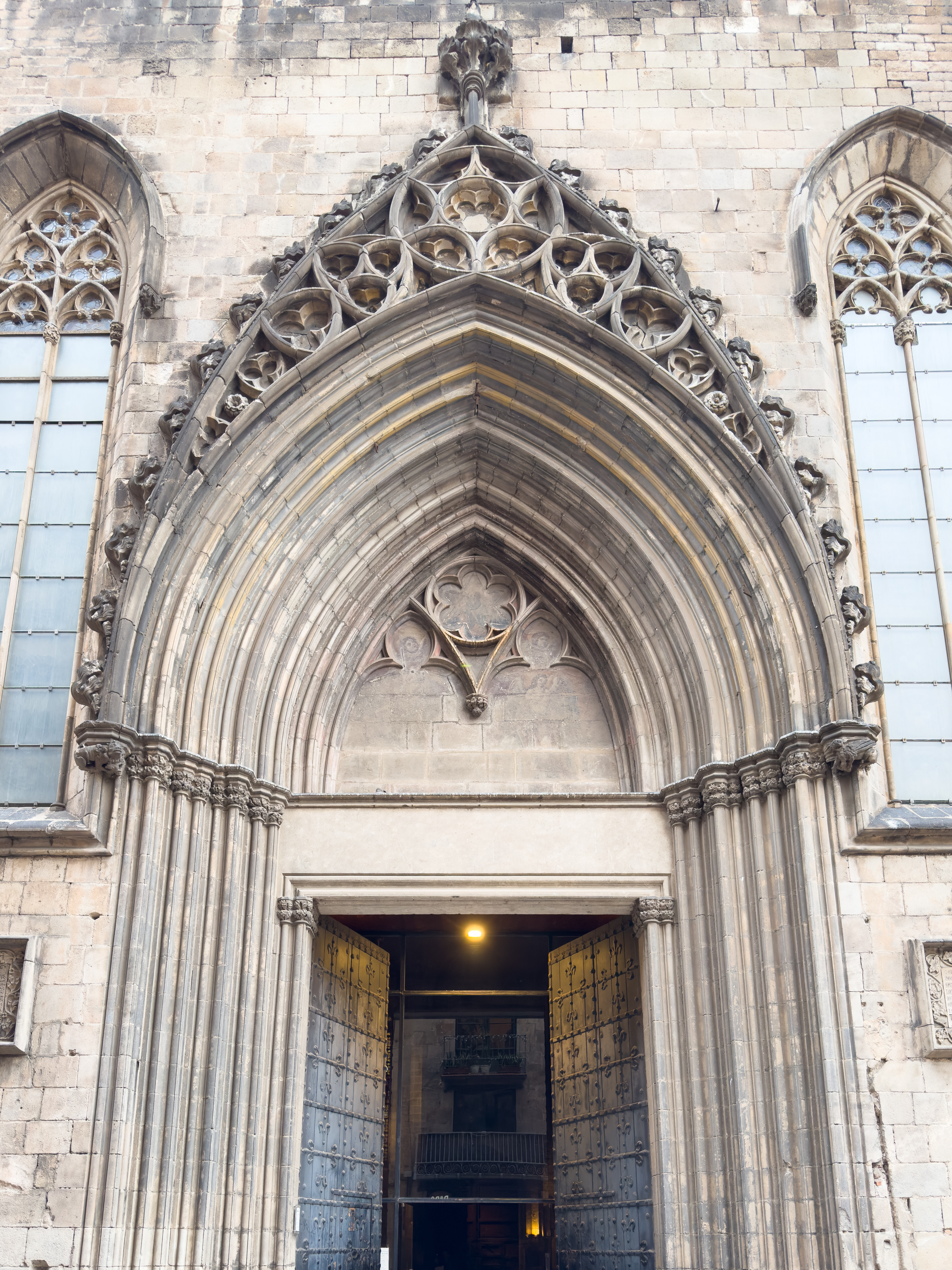

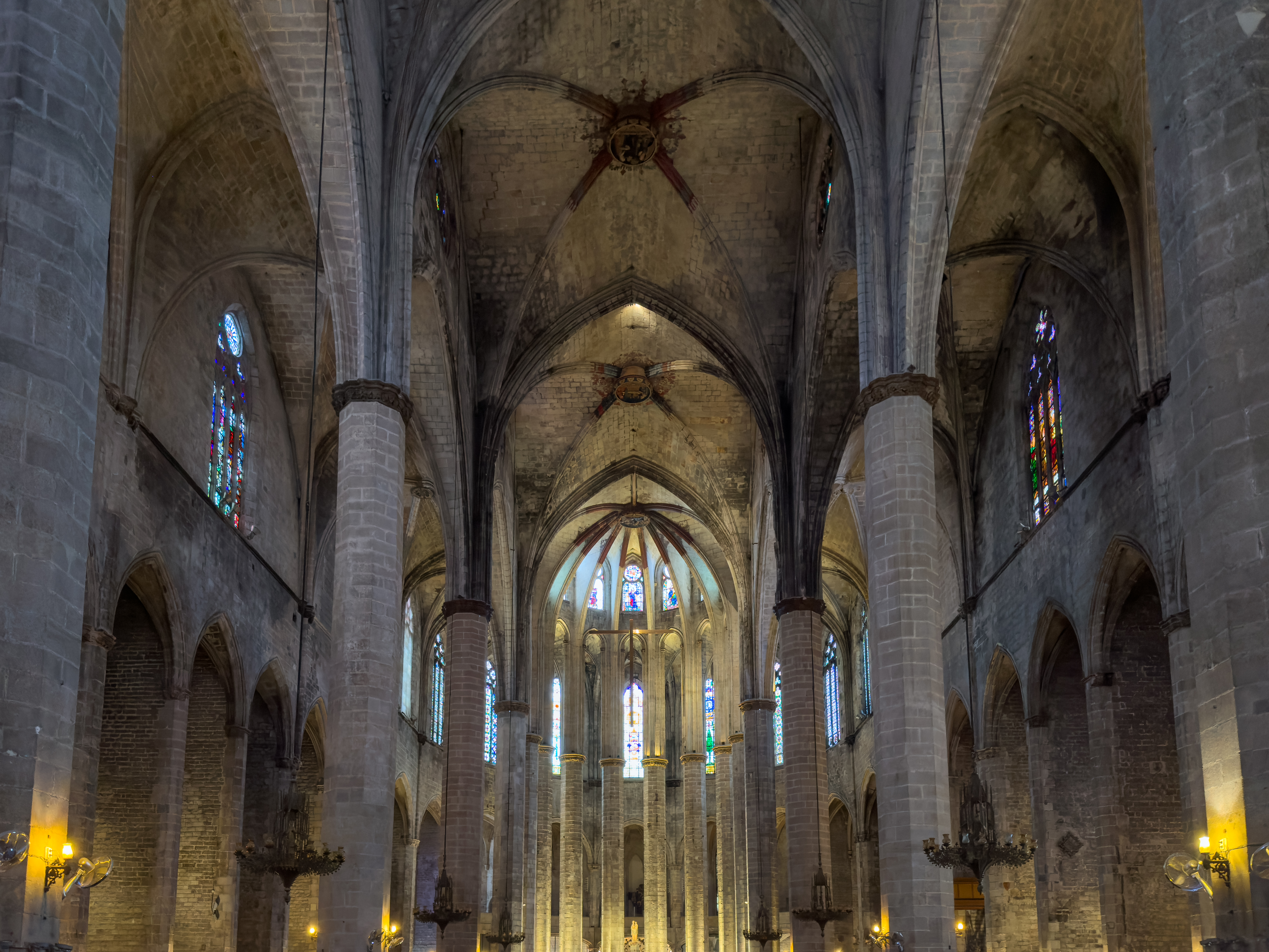

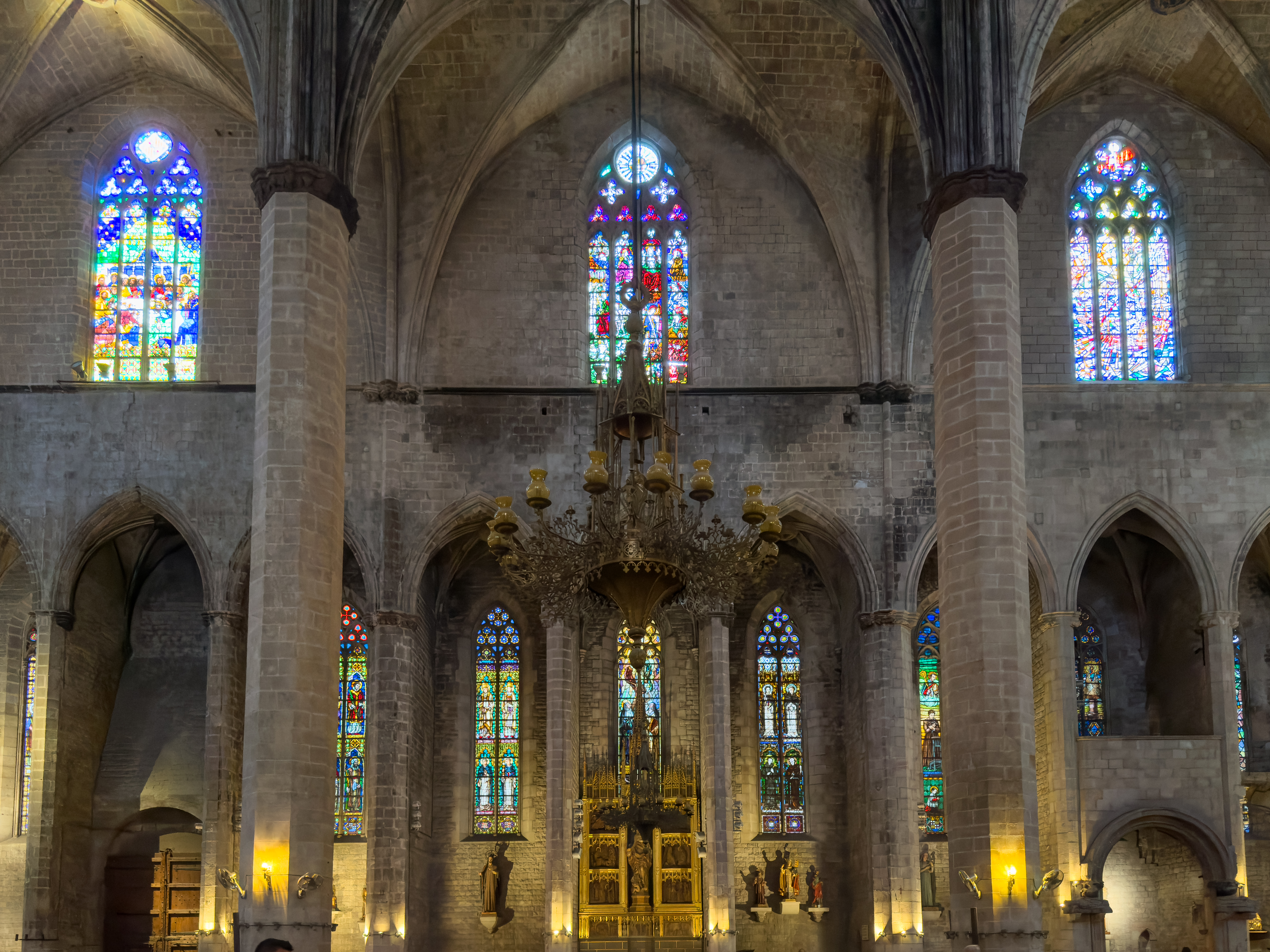

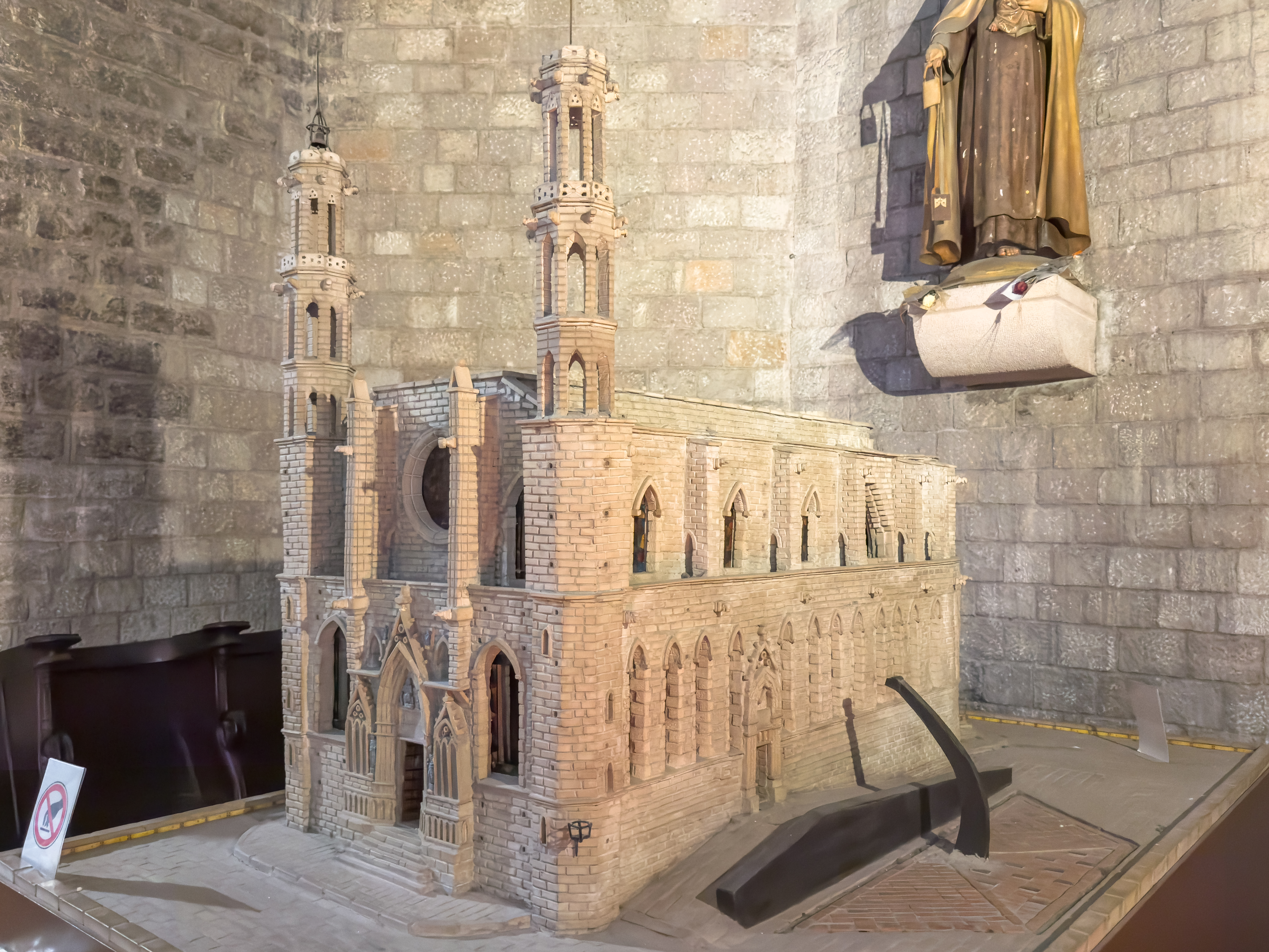

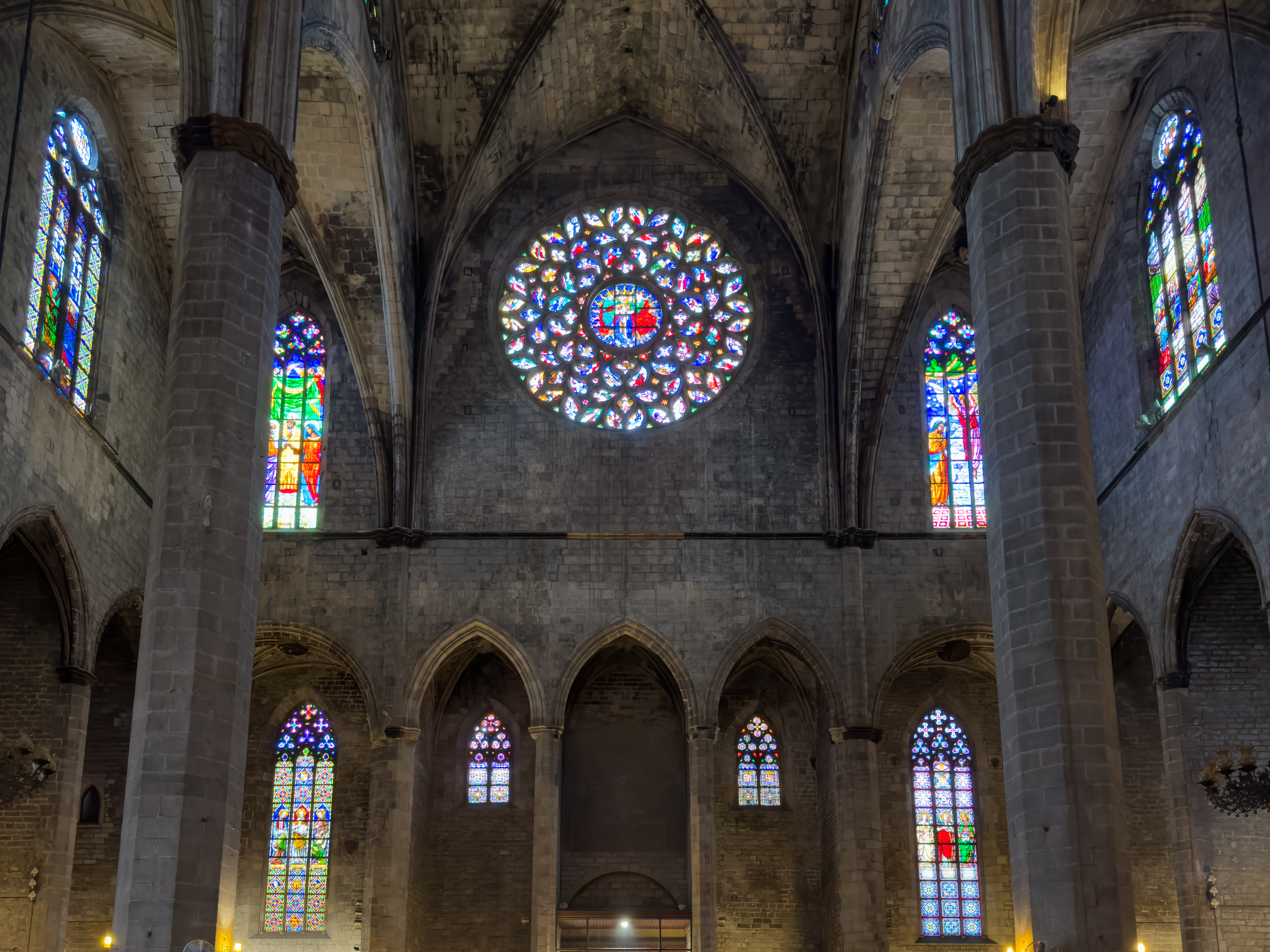

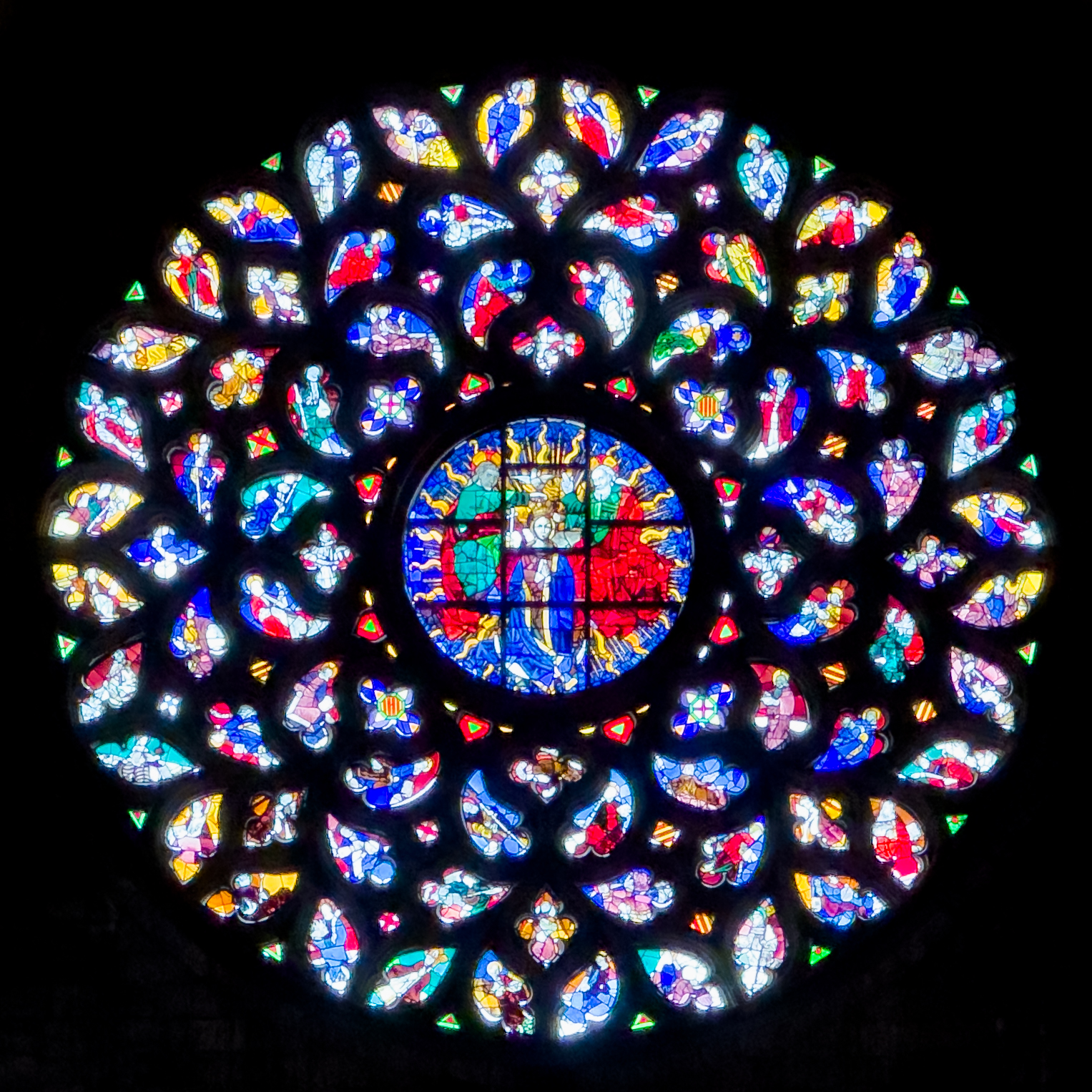

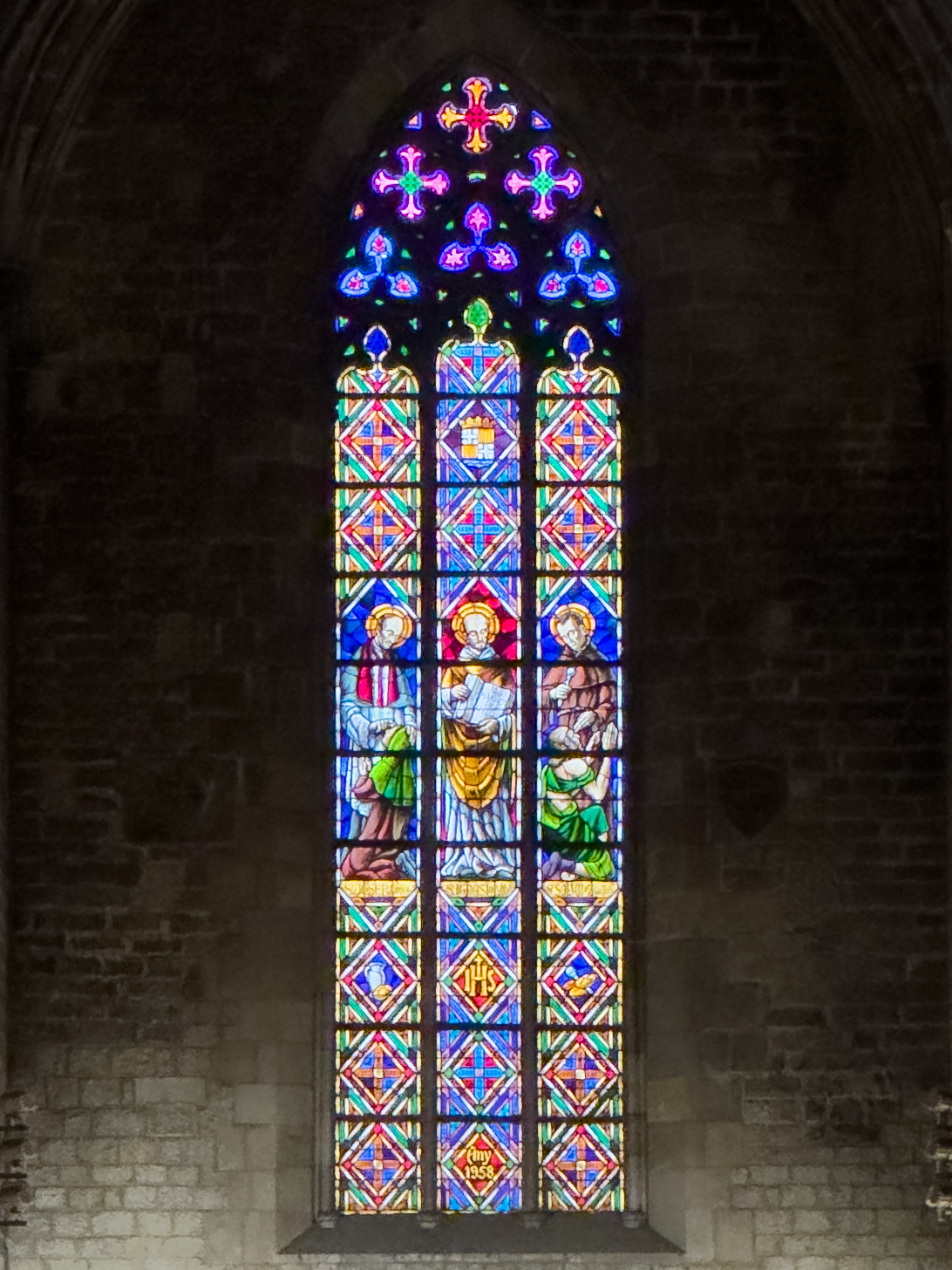
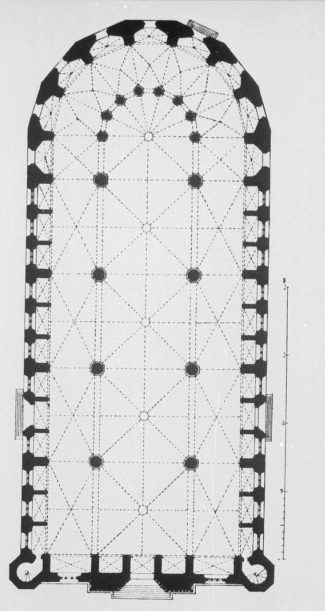
Floor plan

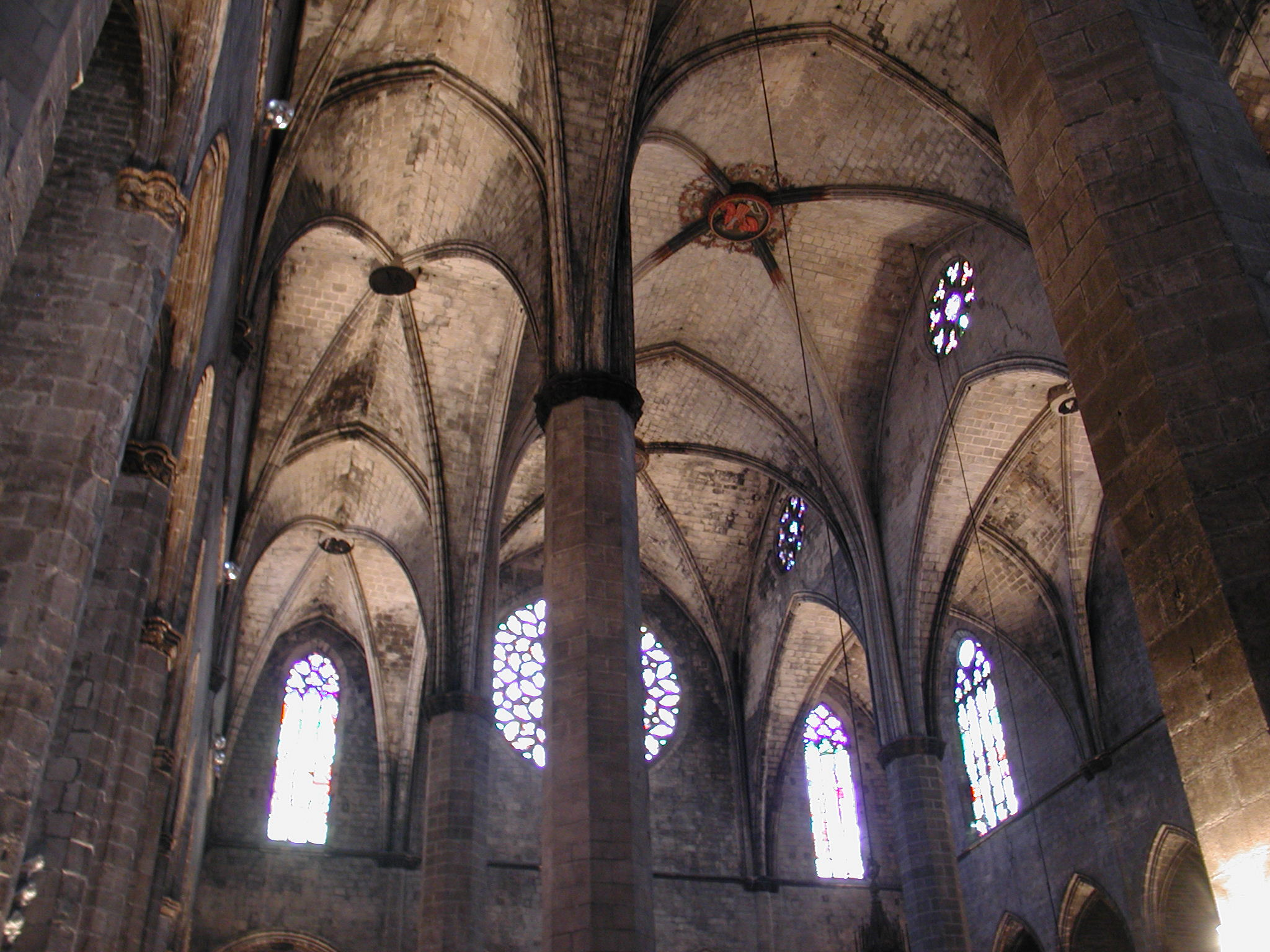
The west end with its rose window, showing the proportions of the three aisles

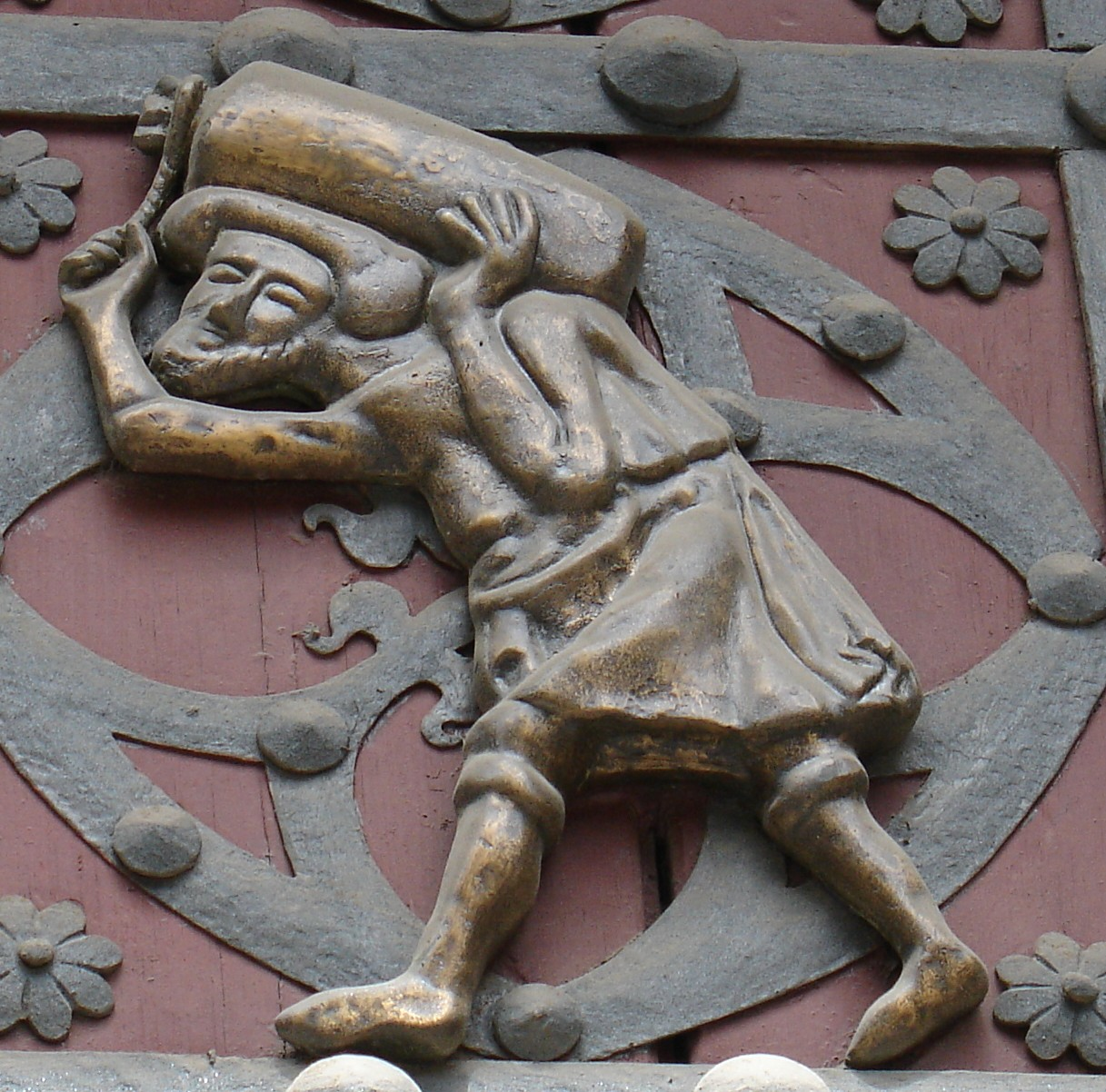
The porters (locally known as 'bastaixos') of La Ribera, who collaborated in the construction of the church transporting stones, are represented on the doors of the main entrance
