= Ildefonso Falcones =

Spanish lawyer and writer

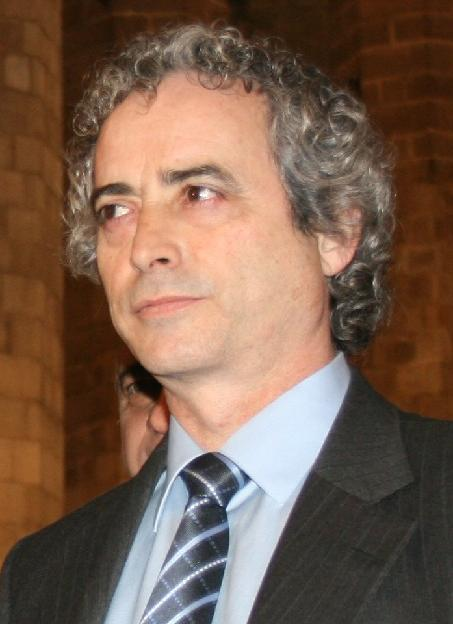
- Ildefonso Falcones in the church of Santa Maria del Mar in 2008.
- Born: Ildefonso Falcones de Sierra; 1959 (age 66–67); Barcelona, Spain
- Occupations: Author and lawyer
- Writing career
- Language: Spanish
- Genre: Historical fiction

Ildefonso Falcones de Sierra (born 1959) is a Spanish lawyer and writer from Barcelona. He is best known for writing the best-seller Cathedral of the Sea.

== Biography ==
Ildefonso Falcones is the son of a lawyer and homemaker. He had a career as a horseback rider at the age of 17, becoming the Junior Champion of Spain in show jumping, as well as excelling in field hockey. His career in sports ended with his father's death that same year. He studied at the College of San Ignacio's Jesuits in Spain. After which, he began his university studies, attempting to earn degrees in economics and law. He eventually decided to drop his studies in economics to balance his studies of law with a job at a bingo in Barcelona.

He currently practices law at his own law firm, located in the Eixample district of Barcelona. And although he previously started his work in literature, for the past few years he has had to balance his work with his passion for writing books. It took him 5 years to finish his first novel.

He became famous with the historical thriller Cathedral of the Sea, published in 2006, and set in 14th century Barcelona. His second novel, La mano de Fátima (2009), deals with the Morisco revolt and later expulsion of the Moriscos. His third novel was La reina descalza (2013), set in between Seville and Madrid in the 18th century, follows the interwoven lives of two women (a former slave from Cuba and a gypsy from Triana) with the Great Gypsy Round-up, as a backdrop. His fourth novel, Los herederos de la tierra, is a continuation to La catedral del mar. His fifth novel, El pintor de almas (2019), set in the mired by social conflict early 20th-century Barcelona, follows the life of an artist and his uneasy relation with an anarchist.

In 2015, Ildefonso Falcones was accused of defrauding the Spanish Treasury of 1,4 million euros between 2009 and 2011 by transferring the copyrights of his works to companies based outside of Spain. In 2016, the case was dismissed when the judge considered that the sale of the copyright for his first novel was in 2004, two years before its editorial success, showing that there was no intent to commit a "fraudulent and malicious manoeuver by said action". However, by February 2018 he was facing those charges again, which could attract a prison sentence up to 9 years. The charges were cancelled in November 2019, described by the judge as "absurd charges".

== Views and positions ==
From an ideological standpoint, he has voiced himself as a supporter of the People's Party (PP). He supported Mariano Rajoy in 2008, the then PP's prime ministerial candidate vis-à-vis the 2008 general election, in a political act at the Santa Maria del Mar church together with other leaders of the People's Party of Catalonia, like Dolors Nadal and Daniel Sirera.

== Books ==
- La catedral del mar (2006)
- La mano de Fátima (2009)
- La reina descalza (2013)
- Los herederos de la tierra (2016)
- El pintor de almas (2019)
- Esclava de la libertad (2022)
