= Navarcles =

- Municipality
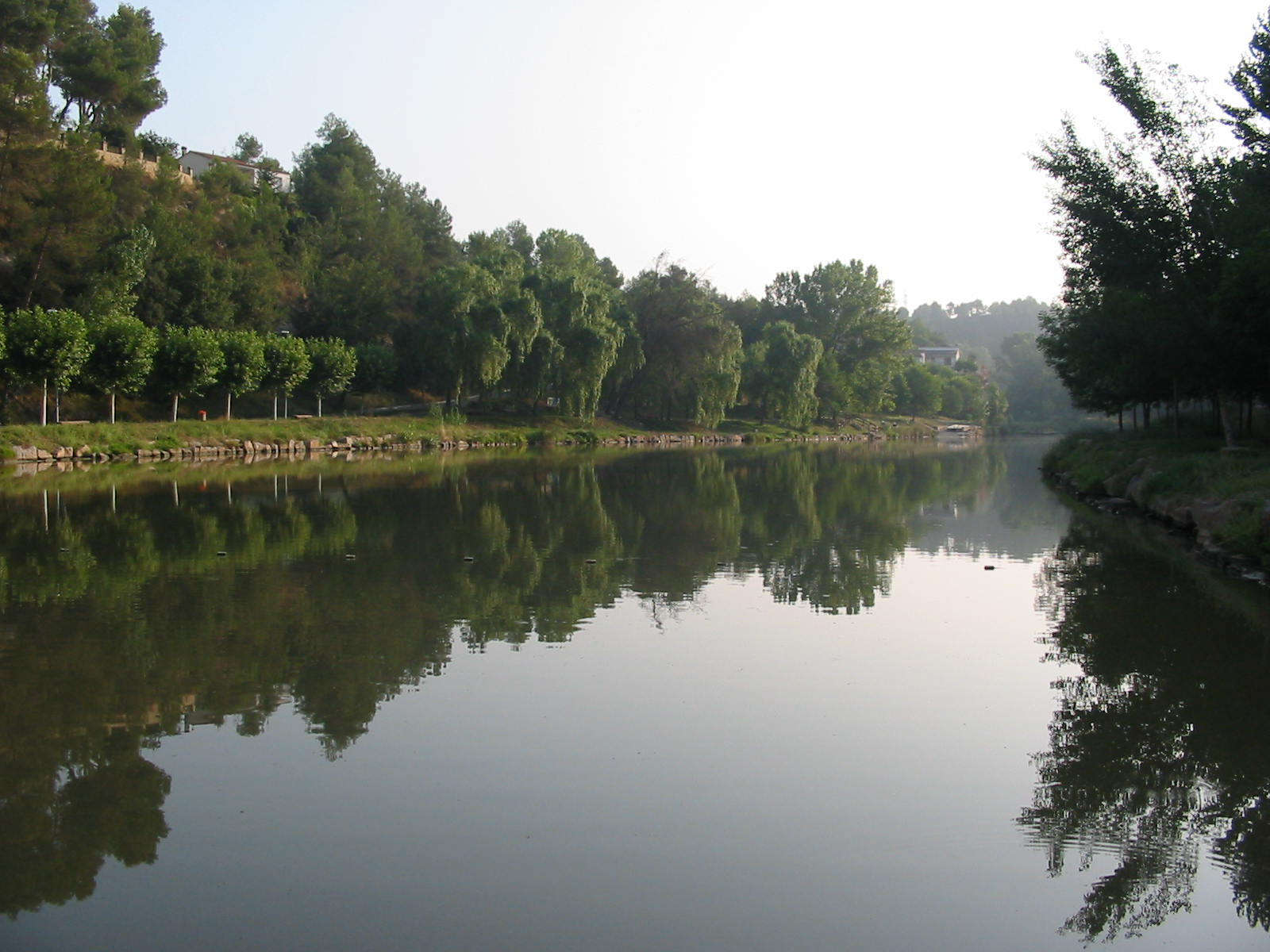
- Parc del Llac, Navarcles

- Location in Catalonia Navarcles (Spain)
- Coordinates: 41.752°N 1.903°E
- Country: Spain
- Community: Catalonia
- Province: Barcelona
- Comarca: Bages

Government
  - Mayor: Llorenç Ferrer Alòs (2015)

Area
  - Total: 5.5 km^{2} (2.1 sq mi)

Population (2025-01-01)
  - Total: 6,276
  - Density: 1,100/km^{2} (3,000/sq mi)
- Website: navarcles.cat

Navarcles (Catalan pronunciation: [nəˈβaɾkləs]) is a municipality in the province of Barcelona and autonomous community of Catalonia, Spain. The municipality covers an area of 3.53 square kilometres (1.36 sq mi) and the population in 2014 was 6,003.

== Demography ==
According to Spanish census data, this is the population of Navarcles in recent years.

1981	1991	2001	2011
4,588	5,111	5,350	5,982
