= List of shipwrecks in November 1873 =

The list of shipwrecks in November 1873 includes ships sunk, foundered, grounded, or otherwise lost during November 1873.

== 1 November ==
List of shipwrecks: 1 November 1873
Ship	State	Description
Jessie Love	United Kingdom	The scow sank in the Clyde. She was later refloated and taken in to Greenock, Renfrewshire for repairs.
Mary Ann	United Kingdom	The ship foundered in the North Sea off St Abb's Head, Berwickshire. Her crew were rescued by the schooner Bexhill (United Kingdom). Mary Ann was on a voyage from Leith, Lothian to West Hartlepool, County Durham.
Mary Ismay	United Kingdom	The ship was driven ashore on "Pellin Strand". Her crew were rescued. She was on a voyage from Glasgow, Renfrewshire to Limerick.
Speculation	United Kingdom	The schooner was driven ashore near Lindisfarne, Northumberland. She was refloated.

== 2 November ==
List of shipwrecks: 2 November 1873
Ship	State	Description
Union	Spain	The schooner was wrecked at Santander with the loss of all hands and seven rescuers.
Volunteer	United Kingdom	The schooner ran aground at Helmsdale, Sutherland and was severely damaged. She was on a voyage from Helmsdale to a Baltic port.

== 3 November ==
List of shipwrecks: 3 November 1873
Ship	State	Description
Emily	United Kingdom	The steamship ran aground in the River Ouse. She was on a voyage from London to Goole, Yorkshire.
Gondola	United Kingdom	The ship ran aground in the Hooghly River. She was on a voyage from Calcutta, India to the Cape of Good Hope, Cape Colony. She was refloated the next day.
Prospero	United Kingdom	The steamship collided with the schooner Hildegard (Denmark) and ran aground at Copenhagen, Denmark. She was on a voyage from Liverpool, Lancashire to Westervik, Sweden. She was refloated.
17 May	Norway	The ship was abandoned in the Atlantic Ocean. Her crew were rescued by Fear Not (United States). The 17 May was on a voyage from Saint John, New Brunswick, Canada to Liverpool, Lancashire, United Kingdom.
Santander Lifeboat	Spain	The lifeboat capsized whilst going to the assistance of the full-rigged ship Nuesa Union (Spain) with the loss of all hands, including three crew of Mino (United Kingdom).
Unnamed	Italy	A full-rigged ship collided with the barque Mary M. Bird (United States) and foundered in the Atlantic Ocean.

== 4 November ==
List of shipwrecks: 4 November 1873
Ship	State	Description
Patriot Queen	United Kingdom	The ship ran aground in the River Wyre. She was on a voyage from Miramichi, New Brunswick, Canada to Fleetwood, Lancashire.

== 5 November ==
List of shipwrecks: 5 November 1873
Ship	State	Description
Bavaria	United Kingdom	The steamship was destroyed by fire on Lake Ontario with the loss of fourteen lives. She was on a voyage from Hamilton, Ontario to Montreal, Quebec, Canada.
Colombo	Italy	The brig was driven ashore at "Gioja", Sicily.
Gazelle	Germany	The schooner was driven ashore at "Gioja".
News Boy	United Kingdom	The schooner was driven ashore at "Gioja".
Pallion	United Kingdom	The steamship foundered in the Bristol Channel 4 nautical miles (7.4 km) west of Lundy Island, Devon. Her crew were rescued. She was on a voyage from Cardiff, Glamorgan to Suez, Egypt.
Rose of Sharon	United Kingdom	The ship was driven ashore on the north point of Öland, Sweden. She was on a voyage from Kronstadt, Russia to an English port.

== 6 November ==
List of shipwrecks: 6 November 1873
Ship	State	Description
Helen and Mary	United Kingdom	The schooner was driven ashore and wrecked at Fife Ness, Fife. Her crew survived.
Laura	United Kingdom	The schooner foundered off the Old Head of Kinsale, County Cork. She was on a voyage from Newport, Monmouthshire to Ballinacurra, County Cork.

== 7 November ==
List of shipwrecks: 7 November 1873
Ship	State	Description
Copernicus	Germany	The barque was driven ashore in Dublin Bay. She was on a voyage from Wicklow, United Kingdom to Memel.
Viking	Canada	The steamship ran aground and sank at Sydney, Nova Scotia. She was on a voyage from Montreal, Quebec to Sydney. She was consequently condemned.
Wave	United Kingdom	The ship sprang a leak and sank in the Clyde. Her crew were rescued. She was on a voyage from Glasgow, Renfrewshire to Belfast, County Antrim.

== 8 November ==
List of shipwrecks: 8 November 1873
Ship	State	Description
Lord Howick	United Kingdom	The schooner ran aground on the Cockle Sand, in the North Sea off the coast of Norfolk. Her six crew were rescued by the Caister Lifeboat The Boys ( Royal National Lifeboat Institution). Lord Howick was on a voyage from Maldon, Essex to Sunderland, County Durham.
Mendora	Brazil	The steamship was driven ashore at Lisbon, Portugal. Her passengers were taken off. She was on a voyage from Rio de Janeiro to Lisbon. She was refloated.
Toimi	(Russian Empire) Grand Duchy of Finland	The brig was driven ashore between Leith and Newhaven, Lothian. She was on a voyage from Vyborg to Leith. She was refloated and taken in to Leith.
Vesta	United Kingdom	The barque was wrecked on the Ower Sand, in the North Sea. Her eleven crew were rescued. She was on a voyage from South Shields, County Durham to Villaricos, Spain.

== 9 November ==
List of shipwrecks: 9 November 1873
Ship	State	Description
Agenoria	United Kingdom	The barque ran aground and sank at Margate, Kent.
Alexander	United Kingdom	The brig was driven ashore at Paignton, Devon. She was on a voyage from "Hammick" to Teignmouth, Devon. She was refloated on 4 December and taken in to Paignton.
Beatitude	United Kingdom	The schooner struck the Knock, off the Boston Deeps. She capsized and sank with the loss of all on board. She was on a voyage from London to Boston, Lincolnshire.
Caermano de Camarenas	Spain	The brig was driven ashore at Portland, Dorset, United Kingdom. Her eleven crew were rescued by rocket apparatus. She was on a voyage from Cienfuegos, Cuba to London.
Dawn	United Kingdom	The brig was driven ashore at Huttoft, Lincolnshire. Her crew were rescued. She was on a voyage from Gävle, Sweden to Newcastle upon Tyne, Northumberland.
Gommershow	United Kingdom	The schooner sank at the Mumbles, Glamorgan.
Huis Garreweer	Netherlands	The brigantine ran aground at Maracaibo, Venezuela and was wrecked. She was on a voyage from Maracaibo to the English Channel.
Iver Hvitfelt	Denmark	The barque was driven ashore at Dungeness, Kent. Her crew were rescued. She was on a voyage from Turku, Grand Duchy of Finland to Pernambuco, Brazil.
Ocean Wave	United Kingdom	The Yorkshire Billyboy was driven ashore and wrecked at Dover, Kent. Her crew were rescued. She was on a voyage from King's Lynn, Norfolk to Calais, France.
Vivid	United Kingdom	The brig was scuttled at Portland, Dorset to prevent her being driven against the quayside and wrecked.
Unnamed	United Kingdom	The ship was driven ashore and wrecked at Paignton.

== 10 November ==
List of shipwrecks: 10 November 1873
Ship	State	Description
Amy	United Kingdom	The brigantine ran aground in the River Liffey.
Haabet	Norway	The ship ran aground on the Longsand, in the North Sea off the coast of Essex, United Kingdom and was abandoned by her crew. She was on a voyage from Fredrikstad to Folkestone, Kent, United Kingdom.
Echo, Nagpore; Pilot, and Robert	United Kingdom	The East Indiaman Nagpore, a full-rigged ship, put in to Kingstown, County Dublin on fire, colliding with the schooner Robert, which was wrecked. She also ran into the schooner Pilot and sank her. She then collided with the fishing trawler Echo, which broke from her moorings, was driven ashore and wrecked. Nagpore was scuttled by gunfire from HMRC Fanny and HMRC Victoria (both Board of Customs). Her captain died in the fire and her pilot was severely burned. She was on a voyage from Calcutta, India to Liverpool, Lancashire.
François Marie	France	The brig was abandoned off the coast of Lincolnshire, United Kingdom. Her crew were rescued by the Skegness Lifeboat.
Meanstead	Sweden	The ship was wrecked at Sunderland, County Durham, United Kingdom. Her crew were rescued.
Schwalbe	Germany	The barque was abandoned off the coast of Lincolnshire. Her crew were rescued by the Skegness Lifeboat.
Skibsvaerflet	Denmark	The sloop was driven ashore on Romsø. She was on a voyage from an English port to Odense. She was refloated in late November.

== 11 November ==
List of shipwrecks: 11 November 1873
Ship	State	Description
Albion	Germany	The ship was driven ashore on Vlieland, Friesland, Netherlands. She was on a voyage from Danzig to Harlingen, Friesland.
Frances Marie	France	The brig was driven ashore near Skegness, Lincolnshire, United Kingdom. She was on a voyage from Christiania, Norway to Dieppe, Seine-Inférieure. She was refloated and taken in to Grimsby, Lincolnshire.
German Emperor	United Kingdom	The steamship was driven ashore at Hendon, County Durham. She was on a voyage from Hamburg, Germany to Sunderland, County Durham.
Gotha	Sweden	The ship was driven ashore on Læsø, Denmark. She was on a voyage from Gothenburg to Newcastle upon Tyne, Northumberland, United Kingdom. She was later refloated and resumed her voyage.
Haabet	Denmark	The schooner was wrecked near Lemvig, Norway. She was on a voyage from Copenhagen to Fanø.
Trelleborg	Norway	The steamship was driven ashore near Ålesund, Denmark. She was refloated with the assistance of tow steamship and taken in to Ålesund.

== 12 November ==
List of shipwrecks: 12 November 1873
Ship	State	Description
Dana	Sweden	The ship ran aground on the Lillegrunden, in the Baltic Sea. She was on a voyage from Sweden to London, United Kingdom. She was refloated and taken in to Copenhagen, Denmark.
Gleniffer	United Kingdom	The ship ran aground near Port Glasgow, Renfrewshire. She was on a voyage from Glasgow, Renfrewshire to Boston, Massachusetts, United States.
Hutton Chaytor	United Kingdom	The steamship ran aground at Dieppe, Seine-Inférieure, France. She was refloated.
Kruse Bjorn	Sweden	The barque was wrecked on the Longsand, in the North Sea off the coast of Essex, United Kingdom. Her crew were rescued. She was on a voyage from Bremerhaven, Germany to Pensacola, Florida, United States.
Levant	United Kingdom	The schooner ran aground on the Newcombe Sand, in the North Sea off the coast of Suffolk. She was refloated with assistance from the Pakefield Lifeboat and assisted in to Lowestoft, Suffolk in a severely leaky condition.
Orust	Germany	The schooner was driven ashore and wrecked at Brouwershaven, Zeeland, Netherlands. She was on a voyage from Danzig to Bruges, West Flanders, Belgium.
Ottille	United Kingdom	The ship ran aground at Stromness, Orkney Islands. She was on a voyage from the White Sea to Liverpool, Lancashire and/or London. She was refloated.
Xenophon	Norway	The barque ran aground on the Chapman Sand.
Zambeze	United Kingdom	The brig was driven ashore at Pladdy, near Looe, Cornwall, United Kingdom. She was on a voyage from Miragoâne, Haiti to Rotterdam, South Holland.
1848	Sweden	The brig ran aground. She was on a voyage from Skutskär to London. She was refloated and resumed her voyage.

== 13 November ==
List of shipwrecks: 13 November 1873
Ship	State	Description
Annie Lee	United Kingdom	The ship was driven ashore at Yarmouth, Isle of Wight. She was refloated the next day and taken in to Portsmouth, Hampshire.
Belvidere	United States	The barque capsized in the Atlantic Ocean with the loss of four of her ten crew. Survivors were rescued by the barque Lohengrin (Germany). Belvidere was on a voyage from New York to Trieste.
Eintracht	Germany	The barque was run into by the barque Themis (Norway) and became waterlogged. Her crew were taken off by the steamship Hoopoe (United Kingdom) on 15 November. Hoopoe took her in tow, but the tow rope later broke. She was towed in to Falmouth, Cornwall, United Kingdom by the steamship Countess of Dublin (United Kingdom) on 16 November. Eintracht had been on a voyage from "Swartwick" to Gloucester, United Kingdom.

== 14 November ==
List of shipwrecks: 14 November 1873
Ship	State	Description
Cartago Nova	Flag unknown	The steamship ran aground in the River Mersey. She was refloated with the assistance of the tug Sailor King (United Kingdom).
Chivari	Italy	The barque collided with Oberon (United Kingdom) 20 nautical miles (37 km) south of Malin Head, County Cork, United Kingdom and was presumed to have foundered. Two of her crew were rescued by Oberon. Chivari was on a voyage from Buenos Aires, Argentina to Liverpool, Lancashire, United Kingdom.
Ingertha	United Kingdom	The barque was abandoned in the Atlantic Ocean. Her crew were rescued by Merrington (United Kingdom). Ingertha was on a voyage from Miramichi, New Brunswick, Canada to Barrow-in-Furness, Lancashire.
Julie	United Kingdom	The schooner was wrecked on the Trandsten, in the Baltic Sea 5 nautical miles (9.3 km) south of Sandhamn, Sweden.
Tinto	United Kingdom	The steamship ran aground in the River Mersey at Seacombe, Cheshire. She was on a voyage from Liverpool to Alicante, Spain. She was refloated and taken in to Liverpool in a leaky condition.

== 15 November ==
List of shipwrecks: 15 November 1873
Ship	State	Description
Diana	United Kingdom	The steamship ran aground in the Nieuw Diep. She was refloated.
Emma	Norway	The barque was wrecked on the Lemon and Ower Sand, in the North Sea. Her crew were rescued. She was on a voyage from Helsinki, Grand Duchy of Finland to Antwerp, Belgium.
May	United Kingdom	The steamship was driven ashore on Aspö, Sweden. She was on a voyage from Middlesbrough, Yorkshire to Oxelösund, Sweden.
Redetore	Italy	The barque was driven ashore at Lydd, Kent, United Kingdom. She was on a voyage from Dunkirk, Nord, France to Cardiff, Glamorgan, United Kingdom.
Rose	United Kingdom	The steamship ran aground near Dumbarton. She was on a voyage from Glasgow, Renfrewshire to Londonderry.
Unido	Portugal	The brig was abandoned in the Atlantic Ocean. She was on a voyage from Pernambuco, Brazil to Porto.

== 16 November ==
List of shipwrecks: 16 November 1873
Ship	State	Description
Anne Katrine	Norway	The schooner foundered in the Dogger Bank. Her crew were rescued by the smack Progress (United Kingdom). Anne Katrine was on a voyage from Rotterdam, South Holland, Netherlands to Sandefjord.
Castilian	United Kingdom	The steamship ran aground at Waterloo, Lancashire. She was on a voyage from Porto, Portugal to Liverpool, Lancashire. She was refloated with assistance from the tugs Alliance and United States (United Kingdom).
Merom	United Kingdom	The ship caught fire at Hong Kong and was scuttled. She was on a voyage from South Shields, County Durham to Hong Kong. She was refloated in January 1874.
Thornhill	United Kingdom	The ship was wrecked near Grand-Métis, Quebec, Canada with the loss of seventeen of her eighteen crew. She was on a voyage from Quebec City to Liverpool.

== 17 November ==
List of shipwrecks: 17 November 1873
Ship	State	Description
Canada	Canada	The ship was destroyed by fire at Quebec City. She was on a voyage from Montreal, Quebec to the River Plate.
Crimea	United Kingdom	The steamship was wrecked at Kilia, Russia. Her crew were rescued by the Kilia Lifeboat but one of them was killed when being landed. Her captain refused to abandon ship and was also killed. She was on a voyage from Odesa, Russia to Galaţi, Ottoman Empire and a British port.
"Excelsior"	United States	The schooner was sunk at anchor at Marblehead, Massachusetts. Abandoned to the Underwriters.
John P. Hale	United States	The schooner was driven out of the harbor at night and was wrecked near Old House Cove, a total loss.
Lady Clare	United Kingdom	The steamship struck a submerged object and sank off Sálvora, Spain. Her crew were rescued.
Maria	Germany	The schooner was driven ashore at "Saudre". She was on a voyage from Brazil to Stockholm, Sweden. She was refloated and found to be leaky.
Schwalbe	Germany	The steamship was driven ashore at Juist. Seventeen of her twenty crew were rescued, three were reported missing.

== 18 November ==
List of shipwrecks: 18 November 1873
Ship	State	Description
Diana	Flag unknown	The ship ran aground on the Maplin Sand, in the North Sea off the coast of Essex, United Kingdom. She was on a voyage from Riga, Russia to Calais, France. She was refloated and taken in to the River Colne.
Emanuael	Germany	The ship collided with the steamship Verona (Germany and sank in the Elbe downstream of St. Pauli. Her crew were rescued.
Eugenie	Russia	The full-rigged ship was driven ashore and wrecked at Bolderāja. Her crew survived.
Eunomia	Norway	The barque was driven ashore at Porkkalanniemi, Grand Duchy of Finland. She was on a voyage from Kronstadt, Russia to Gloucester, United Kingdom.
Filatore	Italy	The barque was wrecked on the Middle Cross Sand, in the North Sea off the coast of Norfolk, United Kingdom. Her ten crew were rescued by the Caister Lifeboat. She was on a voyage from Bremerhaven, Germany to Cardiff, Glamorgan, United Kingdom.
Francis	United Kingdom	The Thames barge was run down by the steamship Tudor (United Kingdom) and sank at Gravesend, Kent with the loss of a crew member.
Georgina	Portugal	The ship was abandoned off Flores Island, Azores. Her crew were rescued. She was on a voyage from the Newfoundland Colony to Madeira.
Helen Patterson	Canada Canada	The barque was wrecked off Liverpool, Nova Scotia. Her crew was rescued by schooner J. H. G. Perkins (United States). She was on a voyage from Liverpool to Portland, Maine, United States.
Hilda	United Kingdom	The barque was driven ashore at Riga, Russia. Her crew were rescued by the Riga Lifeboat.
Lady Clare	United Kingdom	The steamship struck a submerged object and sank off Sálvora, Spain. Her crew were rescued.
Lina	Sweden	The brigantine struck the Chaper Rocks, at the mouth of the Amazon River. She was consequently condemned.
Mino	United Kingdom	The steamship was driven ashore at Santander, Spain and damaged. She was refloated.
Penelope	United Kingdom	The barque put into Nossi-Bé, Madagascar in a sinking condition.
Pictou	Canada	The steamship was missing and was believed destroyed by fire off Prince Edward Island with the loss of all on board.
Two unnamed vessels	United Kingdom	The barges were sunk in the Rochdale Canal at Miles Platting, Lancashire when a burning cotton mill collapsed.

== 19 November ==
List of shipwrecks: 19 November 1873
Ship	State	Description
Rosalie	France	The schooner was run into by the steamship St. Louis (France) and sank in the Gironde downstream of Pauillac, Gironde. Her crew were rescued.
Luna	Norway	The barque ran aground on the West Hoyle Bank, in Liverpool Bay. She was on a voyage from Liverpool, Lancashire, United Kingdom to "Counas". She was refloated with assistance the next day.
Ryvingen	Norway	The ship ran aground at Inverness, United Kingdom and was severely damaged. She was refloated and taken in to Inverness in a leaky condition.

== 20 November ==
List of shipwrecks: 20 November 1873
Ship	State	Description
Agonese	Norway	The ship was driven ashore at Bolderāja, Russia. She was refloated and found to be severely leaky.
Rosanna	United States	The schooner collided with Abbotsford (United Kingdom) and sank in the Schuykill River. Her crew were rescued. Rosanna was on a voyage from Philadelphia, Pennsylvania to Boston, Massachusetts.
Young Marquis	United Kingdom	The pilot cutter struck a sunken wreck and foundered off Nash Point, Glamorgan. Both crew were rescued by a schooner.
Unnamed	Flag unknown	The brig was driven ashore at "Cape Davil", Quebec, Canada.

== 21 November ==
List of shipwrecks: 21 November 1873
Ship	State	Description
Alaska	United States	The steamboat sank in the Ohio River 10 nautical miles (19 km) upstream of Point Pleasant, Ohio. She was on a voyage from Cincinnati, Ohio to New Orleans, Louisiana.
Annie	United Kingdom	The brig ran aground on Spike Island, County Cork. She was refloated and resumed her voyage.
A. P. Rohders	Flag unknown	The steamship was wrecked on Sommers, Grand Duchy of Finland. Her crew were rescued.
Darnley	United Kingdom	The brig ran aground on Spike Island. She was refloated and resumed her voyage.
George	United Kingdom	The ship departed from Lowestoft, Suffolk for Sunderland, County Durham. No further trace, presumed foundered with the loss of all hands.
Hidalgo	United Kingdom	The steamship ran aground off Porkkalanniemi, Grand Duchy of Finland. She was on a voyage from Kronstadt, Russia to Hull, Yorkshire. She was refloated in late December and towed in to Helsinki.
Jane Mary	United Kingdom	The schooner sank in the North Sea off Scheveningen, South Holland, Netherlands. Her crew were rescued. She was on a voyage from Rotterdam South Holland to Hartlepool, County Durham.
Lady of the Lake	United Kingdom	The steamship was driven ashore in the Volta River.
Margarita	Italy	The barque was wrecked at Algeciras, Spain. Her crew were rescued. She was on a voyage from Zakynthos, Greece to New York, United States.
Nurnberg	Germany	The steamship was driven ashore at Greenock, Renfrewshire, United Kingdom. She was refloated.
Petrea	(Russian Empire) Grand Duchy of Finland	The ship was driven ashore in the Aspö Islands. She was on a voyage from Hamina to London, United Kingdom. She was refloated and towed in to Karlskrona, Sweden in a leaky condition.
Westmoreland	United States	The ship was destroyed by fire at Antwerp, Belgium.

== 22 November ==
List of shipwrecks: 22 November 1873
Ship	State	Description
Canadian Lass	United Kingdom	The brig was driven ashore near Ardwell, Wigtownshire. Her seven crew survived. She was on a voyage from Dublin to Ardrossan, Ayrshire.
Clarisse	France	The barque was wrecked in the Minquiers, Channel Islands with the loss of all but one of her crew. She was on a voyage from Bordeaux, Gironde to Granville, Manche.
Constantia	United Kingdom	The ship foundered in the North Sea off Lowestoft, Suffolk. Her crew were rescued by Acacia. Constantia was on a voyage from London to Hull, Yorkshire, United Kingdom.
Loch Earn, and Ville du Havre	United Kingdom; France	An illustration of Ville du Havre (right) sinking after colliding with Loch Earn (left). Loch Earn later sank as well. The steamship Ville du Havre collided with the three-masted ship Loch Earn and sank in the Atlantic Ocean(47°21′N 35°31′W) with the loss of 226 of the 313 people on board. Survivors were rescued by Loch Earn. Ville du Havre was on a voyage from New York to Havre de Grâce, Seine-Inférieure. Loch Earn subsequently sank. All on board were rescued by Trimountain (United States). She was on a voyage from Bristol, Gloucestershire to New York.
Louisas and Maria	United Kingdom	The schooner was driven ashore at Calais, France. Her crew were rescued. She was refloated on 2 December.
Matilde	France	The steamship sank at Calais. She was on a voyage from Dunkirk, Nord to Granville, Manche.
Thames	United Kingdom	The steamship ran aground and sank in the River Tees at Middlesbrough, Yorkshire. She was on a voyage from Stockton-on-Tees, County Durham to Middlesbrough.
Tyne	United Kingdom	The ship was driven ashore at Eyemouth, Berwickshire. She was on a voyage from Hartlepool, County Durham to Montrose, Forfarshire. She was refloated and taken in to Berwick upon Tweed, Northumberland in a leaky condition.
Unicorn	United Kingdom	The brigantine was abandoned south west of Girvan, Ayrshire. Her six crew were rescued by the Girvan Lifeboat. Unicorn was on a voyage from Dublin to Irvine, Ayrshire. She was subsequently takne in to Loch Ryan by the steamship Albion (United Kingdom).
William and Jane	United Kingdom	The schooner was driven ashore and wrecked at Nefyn, Caernarfonshire. She was on a voyage from Caernarfon to Newport, Monmouthshire.
William and John	United Kingdom	The ship foundered in the North Sea off Southwold, Suffolk. Her crew survived. She was on a voyage from Seaham, County Durham to Ipswich, Suffolk.
Willie	United Kingdom	The brigantine was driven ashore at Ardrossan. She was refloated on 24 November.

== 23 November ==
List of shipwrecks: 23 November 1873
Ship	State	Description
Cairnduna	United Kingdom	The schooner was abandoned off Scrabster, Caithness. Her crew survived.
Countess of Fortescue	United Kingdom	The schooner foundered off the Crosby Lightship ( Trinity House), in Liverpool Bay with the loss of all six crew.
Frolic	United Kingdom	The schooner was wrecked on the Jordan Flats, in Liverpool Bay with the loss of all six crew. She was on a voyage from Weymouth, Dorset to Liverpool, Lancashire.
Josepha	Belgium	The ship was wrecked on the Grossvogel Sand, in the North Sea. Her crew were rescued.
Mathilda	United Kingdom	The schooner was driven ashore at Le Crotoy, Somme, France with the loss of all six crew. She was later refloated.

== 24 November ==
List of shipwrecks: 24 November 1873
Ship	State	Description
Arnaldo	Italy	The brig was wrecked near Malpica de Bergantiños. She was on a voyage from Liverpool, Lancashire, United Kingdom to Pertusola, Sicily.
Canadian	United Kingdom	The steamship ran aground in the Carron River.
Clyde	United Kingdom	The barque was wrecked at Bray Head, County Wicklow with the loss of nine of the fourteen people on board. She was on a voyage from Saint John's, Newfoundland Colony to Sharpness, Gloucestershire.
Flamsteed	United Kingdom	The steamship collided with HMS Bellerophon (Royal Navy) and sank. All on board were rescued by Blimani (Portugal.
Harry	United Kingdom	The smack was driven ashore at Grimsby, Lincolnshire. She was refloated.
Henri	France	The ship was wrecked off Dunkirk, Nord. She was on a voyage from Callao, Peru to Dunkirk.
Robert Lowe	United Kingdom	The cable layer, a steamship, was wrecked in Shagrock Cove, near Placentia, Newfoundland Colony with the loss of 24 of her crew.
Sarah	(Dominion of Newfoundland) Newfoundland Colony	The schooner was lost whilst on a voyage from Saint John's to Tilt Cove.
Torrance	United Kingdom	The brig was driven ashore on the Long Craig Rocks, off the coast of Ayrshire. Her crew were rescued by the Ardrossan Lifeboat. She was refloated on 11 December and towed in to Glasgow, Renfrewshire.

== 25 November ==
List of shipwrecks: 25 November 1873
Ship	State	Description
Amanda	United Kingdom	The schooner was driven ashore at the Hurst Castle, Hampshire. She was on a voyage from Rouen, Seine-Inférieure, France to Liverpool, Lancashire.
Sophia Ellers	Germany	The ship was driven ashore on Wangeroog.

== 26 November ==
List of shipwrecks: 26 November 1873
Ship	State	Description
America	Canada	The full-rigged ship foundered in the Grand Banks of Newfoundland with the loss of five of her 21 crew. Survivors took to the longboat; they were rescued on 3 December by the barque Louisa Richards (Germany). America was on a voyage from Barrow-in-Furness, Lancashire, United Kingdom to Saint John, New Brunswick.
Coquette	France	The schooner was wrecked near Porthleven, Cornwall, United Kingdom. Four crew were rescued. She was on a voyage from Bordeaux, Gironde to Swansea, Glamorgan, United Kingdom.
Eureka	United Kingdom	The steamship collided with the steamship Ryhope and foundered in Robin Hoods Bay. Her sixteen crew were rescued by the steamship Abeona (United Kingdom). Eureka was on a voyage from Sunderland, County Durham to London, or from Middlesbrough, Yorkshire to Antwerp, Belgium.
König Wilhelm I	Germany	The steamship ran aground in the Nieuwe Diep. She was on a voyage from New York, United States to Bremen. She was refloated in March 1873. Declared a total loss.
Lotus	United Kingdom	The schooner was wrecked on the Harry Furlong Rocks, off the coast of Anglesey. She was on a voyage from Charlestown, Cornwall to Runcorn, Cheshire.
Thomas	United Kingdom	The brig was wrecked on the Haisborough Sands, on the North Sea off the coast of Norfolk. Her crew were rescued by the smack Valentine (United Kingdom). Thomas was on a voyage from Shoreham-by-Sea, Sussex to the River Tyne.

== 27 November ==
List of shipwrecks: 27 November 1873
Ship	State	Description
Ann	United Kingdom	The fishing smack was run into by the schooner Dialect (United Kingdom) and sank in the North Sea 2 nautical miles (3.7 km) east south east of Spurn Point, Yorkshire. Her crew were rescued by Dialect.
Anne	United Kingdom	The ship collided with Diederich (Denmark) and foundered. Her crew were rescued.
Arango	Canada	The schooner was driven onto a reef and wrecked off Liverpool, Nova Scotia.
Bonafide	Canada	The schooner was driven onto a reef and wrecked off Liverpool, Nova Scotia.
Conqueror	United Kingdom	The schooner was driven ashore at Ardrossan, Ayrshire. She was on a voyage from Dublin to Ardrossan.
Constant	France	The brig was wrecked near Brest, Finistère. She was on a voyage from Marseille, Bouches-du-Rhône to Rouen, Seine-Inférieure.
Justine	France	The schooner was driven ashore at Cap Gris Nez, Pas-de-Calais. Her crew were rescued.
Mathilde	Germany)	The ship was driven ashore and wrecked on Terschelling, Friesland, Netherlands. She was on a voyage from Memel to London, United Kingdom.
Renfrewshire	United Kingdom	The barque was wrecked on Anticosti Island, Nova Scotia. Her crew were rescued. She was on a voyage from Quebec City, Canada to Greenock, Renfrewshire.
Unnamed	United Kingdom	The schooner was driven ashore at Ardrossan.

== 28 November ==
List of shipwrecks: 28 November 1873
Ship	State	Description
Apollo	United Kingdom	The schooner was wrecked near Lemvig, Norway with the loss of a crew member. She was on a voyage from Calais, France to Blyth, Northumberland.
Becton	United Kingdom	The steamship foundered off "Oliveira Island" with the loss of 22 of her 23 crew. She was on a voyage from Cardiff, Glamorgan to Malta.
Competitor	United Kingdom	The schooner sprang a leak 20 nautical miles (37 km) east of the Vlie. She was taken in tow by the steamship European (United Kingdom) and was beached near Harlingen, Friesland, Netherlands. Competitor was on a voyage from Rotterdam, South Holland, Netherlands to Hull, Yorkshire.

== 29 November ==
List of shipwrecks: 29 November 1873
Ship	State	Description
Forest Deer	United Kingdom	The ship was driven ashore at Garston, Lancashire.
Jaypore	United Kingdom	The ship departed from Calcutta, India for Liverpool, Lancashire. No further trace, presumed foundered with the loss of all hands.
Little Queen	United Kingdom	The Galway hooker sprang a leak and was abandoned off Dungarvan, County Waterford. Her six crew were rescued by the Dungarvan Lifeboat.

== 30 November ==
List of shipwrecks: 30 November 1873
Ship	State	Description
Africaine	France	The ship was driven ashore at Dunkirk, Nord. She was on a voyage from Philippeville, Algeria to Dunkirk.
Argonaut	France	The barque was driven ashore at Cardiff, Glamorgan, United Kingdom. She was on a voyage from Cardiff to Havre de Grâce, Seine-Inférieure. She was refloated the next day.
James Kennedy	United Kingdom	The steamship sprang a leak and was abandoned off the Dutch coast. Her crew were rescued by the smack William and Louise (United Kingdom). James Kennedy was on a voyage from Rotterdam, South Holland, Netherlands to South Shields, County Durham. She came ashore at Petten, North Holland on 1 December.
Thetis	United Kingdom	The ship was abandoned off the Dudgeon Sandbank, in the North Sea with the loss of a crew member. She was on a voyage from London to Hartlepool, County Durham.
Wanderer	United Kingdom	The ship sank in the English Channel 25 nautical miles (46 km) west of Berck, Pas-de-Calais, France with the loss of two of her crew. She was on a voyage from Goole, Yorkshire to Cette, Hérault, France.

== Unknown date ==
List of shipwrecks: Unknown date in November 1873
Ship	State	Description
Aaron Eaton	United Kingdom	The brig ran aground on the Nore. She was on a voyage from Memel, Germany to London. She was later refloated with the assistance of two tugs and resumed her voyage.
Aghios Spiridone	Germany	The brig ran aground off Eierland, North Holland, Netherlands. Her crew were rescued.
Alexia	Denmark	The schooner ran aground on the Bokkegat. She was on a voyage from Saint Petersburg, Russia to Rotterdam, South Holland, Netherlands.
Amoor	United Kingdom	The ship was driven ashore at Sainte-Anne, Canada. She was refloated.
Ann	United Kingdom	The ship was driven ashore at Fort William, Inverness-shire. She was on a voyage from Liverpool, Lancashire to Montrose, Forfarshire. She was refloated and resumed her voyage.
Anna Maria	Germany	The barque was driven ashore on Norderney. Her crew were rescued. She was on a voyage from Danzig to Brake.
Argentina	United Kingdom	The ship was driven ashore at Matane, Quebec, Canada. She was on a voyage from Matane to London.
Ariel	United States	The steamship was wrecked. She was on a voyage from Hakodate to Yokohama, Japan.
Armenia, and Beysen Zfa	United States; Greece	The barque Armentia collided with the brig Beysen Zfa off Syros, Greece. She was on a voyage from New York to Smyrna, Ottoman Empire. She put in to Syros in a severely damaged condition. Beysen Zfa sank.
Athole	United Kingdom	The barque was driven ashore and wrecked on Maio Island, Cape Verde Islands.
Augustine	United Kingdom	The brigantine was lost off "Gioja", Spain. Her crew were rescued.
Catharina	Norway	The ship was wrecked near Hammerfest. She was on a voyage from Hammerfest to a Mediterranean port.
Ceres	United Kingdom	The steamship ran aground at Helsinki, Grand Duchy of Finland. She was refloated and found to be leaky.
Charles	Flag unknown	The ship was driven ashore and wrecked on the coast of Essex, United Kingdom in the second week of November.
Charles and Marie	France	The ship sank off Saint-Brieuc, Côtes du Nord. Her crew were rescued.
Cingalese	United Kingdom	The steamship was driven ashore at North Sydney, Nova Scotia, Canada. She was on a voyage from Montreal to Queenstown, County Cork. She was refloated.
Circe	United Kingdom	The full-rigged ship was wrecked on a reef east of Boa Vista, Cape Verde Islands. Her 24 crew were rescued. She was on a voyage from Cardiff, Glamorgan to Valparaíso, Chile. The wreck was plundered by the local inhabitants.
Cologne	United Kingdom	The steamship was driven ashore in the River Thames. She was on a voyage from Ostend, Belgium to London.
Danubio	United Kingdom	The crewless brig was driven ashore at the mouth of the Mazafran River, Algeria. She had been on a voyage from the River Tyne to Savona, Italy.
Dawn	United Kingdom	The brig was driven ashore and wrecked at Huttoft, Lincolnshire. Her crew were rescued. She was on a voyage from Gävle, Sweden to Newcastle upon Tyne, Northumberland.
Diana	Norway	The barque ran aground on the Lillegrunden. She was on a voyage from a Swedish port to London.
Eich	Germany	The brig ran aground in the "Sarron River" and was severely damaged. She was on a voyage from Riga, Russia to Rostock.
Eindracht	Germany	The barque collided with another vessel and was abandoned off the Smalls Lighthouse, Cornwall, United Kingdom. She was on a voyage from Griefswald to Gloucester, United Kingdom. She was taken in tow on 16 November by the steamship Countess of Dublin (United Kingdom).
Elfrida	Denmark	The ship was wrecked on the coast of Iceland. Her crew were rescued.
Ernest	Germany	The schooner was driven ashore and wrecked at Brouwershaven, Zeeland, Netherlands. She was on a voyage from Danzig to Bruges, West Flanders, Belgium.
Escape	United Kingdom	The ship was driven ashore and wrecked at Lockeport, Nova Scotia. Her crew were rescued. She was on a voyage from Greenock, Renfrewshire to New York.
Fencer	United Kingdom	The schooner was driven ashore and wrecked in Robin Hood's Bay. She was on a voyage from Gravesend, Kent to Blyth, Northumberland.
Finale	Germany	The ship was driven ashore on Borkum. Her crew were rescued. She was on a voyage from Bergen, Norway to Hamburg. She was refloated.
Frances Ann	United Kingdom	The schooner was wrecked off Brouwershaven. She was on a voyage from Maryport, Cumberland to Rotterdam.
Fratelli Viacava	United Kingdom	The ship ran aground on the Dolgaja Bank, in the Black Sea. She was refloated and put in to Marianople, Russia.
George and Louisa	Germany	The brig was driven ashore at Clee Ness, Lincolnshire. She was on a voyage from Riga to Rotterdam. She was refloated with assistance from the Cleethorpes Lifeboat and assisted in to Grimsby, Lincolnshire in a waterlogged condition.
Germana	Germany	The ship ran aground on the Lillegrund. She was on a voyage from Stralsund to Antwerp, Belgium. She was refloated with asstance from the steamship Switzer (Germany, which took her in tow.
German Empire	United Kingdom	The ship ran aground on the Sud. She was on a voyage from Hamburg to Hartlepool, County Durham. She was refloated and taken in to Cuxhaven, Germany.
Gesina	Netherlands	The ship was driven ashore in the Gulf of Finland near "Sortavala". She was on a voyage from Kronstadt to Amsterdam, North Holland.
Herbert	United Kingdom	The ship was driven ashore and wrecked on the coast of Essex in the second week of November.
Ida Gertruida	Flag unknown	The ship was wrecked at Kuressaare, Russia.
Ide	Denmark	The barque was driven ashore at Dungeness, Kent, United Kingdom. Her crew were rescued.
Jason	Denmark	The ship was wrecked on the coast of Iceland. Her crew were rescued.
Jerome Jones	United Kingdom	The ship was wrecked on Salt Key. Her crew were rescued. She was on a voyage from Troon, Ayrshire to Havana, Cuba.
Johanna Juhl	United Kingdom	The ship ran aground at Malmö, Sweden. She was refloated with assistance from the steamship Riabotnik (Russia) and taken in to Riga.
Joseph Somes	United Kingdom	The ship ran aground on a reef off Östergarn, Sweden. She was on a voyage from Kronstadt to Hull, Yorkshire.
Juliane	Denmark	The schooner foundered off Sønderho on or before 28 November.
Julie	United Kingdom	The ship was wrecked 5 nautical miles (9.3 km) south of Sandhamn, Sweden.
Karin	Norway	The ship was driven ashore and wrecked near Lemvig, Denmark. She was on a voyage from Dordrecht, South Hollan to Fredrikshald.
Keldo	United Kingdom	The steamship collided with the steamship Ajax (United Kingdom) and was beached in the River Thames.
Kingbird	United Kingdom	The schooner was wrecked at Point Michaud, Nova Scotia.
Leodad	Norway	The barque was abandoned at sea before 11 November. Her crew were rescued by the steamship Robert Ingham (United Kingdom). Leodad was on a voyage from Cardiff to Odesa, Russia.
Linken	Norway	The barque was driven ashore at Falsterbo, Sweden. She was on a voyage from a port in Norrbotten, Sweden to London, United Kingdom. She was refloated and taken in to Copenhagen, Denmark in a leaky condition.
Loire	France	The ship was abandoned at sea. Her crew were rescued. She was on a voyage from Bordeaux, Gironde to Callao, Peru.
Lord of the Isles	United Kingdom	The brig was driven ashore and wrecked at East London, Cape Colony.
Lord Reidhaven	United Kingdom	The schooner was wrecked at Lossiemouth, Moray. Her three crew were rescued by the Lossiemouth Lifeboat.
Lotus	Norway	The brig was abandoned in the Atlantic Ocean. Her crew were rescued by Barletta (Italy).
Lucie	Germany	The ship ran aground off Domesnes, Courland Governorate. She was on a voyage from Riga to an English port. She was refloated and resumed her voyage, but put in to Copenhagen in a leaky condition.
Marchioness of Queensbury	United Kingdom	The ship was driven ashore on Hare Island. She was on a voyage from Quebec City, Canada to Hull. She was refloated.
Maresca	United Kingdom	The ship was run ashore at Rehoboth, Massachusetts, United States. She was on a voyage from Agrigento, Sicily to Philadelphia, Pennsylvania.
Margaretha	Italy	The barque was wrecked in Sandy Bay, 2 nautical miles (3.7 km) south of Alicante, Spain. Her fourteen crew were rescued. She was on a voyage from Patras, Greece to New York.
Marie	Germany	The schooner ran aground at "Sundre". She was on a voyage from Brazil to Stockholm, Sweden. She was refloated and found to be leaky.
Mia Padre	Italy	The ship ran aground on the Meloria Bank. She was on a voyage from Taganrog, Russia to Genoa.
Michelino Gallo	Italy	The ship was wrecked at Porto d'Anzio. She was on a voyage from Genoa to Naples.
Minerva	Spain	The steamship was driven ashore at Key West, Florida, United States before 21 November. She was refloated, and sailed on that date for Havana.
Mozem	United States	The ship was lost in the South China Sea.
Nehalennia	Netherlands	The barque was destroyed by fire near Anjer, Netherlands East Indies. At least eight crew survived. She was on a voyage from Amsterdam to Batavia, Netherlands East Indies.
Nummer Funf	Germany	The barque ran aground on the Swailfort Reef, in the Baltic Sea. Her crew were rescued. She was on a voyage from Riga to an English port.
Ornskjold	Norway	The barque was driven ashore on Skagen, Denmark. Her crew were rescued. She was on a voyage from Tromsø to Mallorca, Spain.
Ottilie	Germany	The brig ran aground near Helsingborg, Sweden. She was refloated and towed in to Helsingør, Denmark.
Persia	United Kingdom	The barque was wrecked in Orange Bay, Jamaica with some loss of life.
Persia	United Kingdom	The ship was driven ashore in the Hooghly River at Kulpee, India.
Petrus Hendriks	Netherlands	The ship was driven ashore on Læsø, Denmark. She was on a voyage from Halmstad Sweden to Leith. She was refloated and taken in to Fredrikshavn, Denmark.
Pride	(United Kingdom of Great Britain and Ireland) Isle of Man	The ship was wrecked at Ballyshannon, County Donegal. She was on a voyage from Belfast, County Antrim to Ballyshannon.
Probo	Italy	The ship was driven ashore at Rehoboth, Massachusetts. She was on a voyage from Agrigento to Philadelphia, Pennsylvania. She was refloated on 14 November and taken in to Lewes, Delaware, United States.
Pro Tem	United Kingdom	The ship was driven ashore and wrecked at St. Dennis Point. She was on a voyage from Montreal to Plymouth.
Providence	United Kingdom	The sloop was abandoned in the North Sea. Her crew were rescued by a steamship. She was subsequently taken in to Grimsby by the fishing smack Providence (United Kingdom).
Rafael Pomar	Spain	The barque ran aground on the English Bank, in the River Plate. She was refloated and taken in to Montevideo, Uruguay in a leaky condition.
Redwing	United States	The ship was abandoned at sea. She was on a voyage from Baltimore, Maryland to Rio de Janeiro, Brazil.
Richard Robinson	United States	The ship was abandoned in the Atlantic Ocean. Her 22 crew were rescued by the barque Admete (Norway). Richard Robertson was on a voyage from New York to Liverpool. She was discovered by the steamship Abyssinia (United Kingdom), which put some of her crew on board. They took her in to Halifax, Nova Scotia.
River Eden	United Kingdom	The barque was set afire by her captain and abandoned off Bahia, Brazil. All seventeen crew were rescued by Juniata (United Kingdom). River Eden was on a voyage from London to Valparaíso, Chile. She subsequently exploded and sank. Although her captain had been restrained, he managed to jump overboard from Lusitania, committing suicide.
Scottish Maid	United Kingdom	The schooner was driven ashore at Swansea, Glamorgan. She was later refloated and towed in to Swansea.
Sophie	United Kingdom	The ship was driven ashore at Agger, Denmark with the loss of a crew member. She was on a voyage from St. Davids, Pembrokeshire to Copenhagen, Denmark.
Star of Hope	United Kingdom	The lugger foundered off Smith's Knowl, in the North Sea off the north Norfolk coast. Her crew were rescued.
Stirling	United Kingdom	The steamship ran aground on the Little Herwit. She was on a voyage from Kronstadt to Leith, Lothian. She was refloated and towed in to Leith.
St. Kevin	United Kingdom	The ship was driven ashore at Sainte-Anne. She was refloated and found to be leaky.
St. Mungo	United Kingdom	The ship was destroyed by fire in the Indian Ocean. Her crew were rescued by the barque Taria Topan (Germany).
Sultan	United Kingdom	The brig was abandoned south east of Cape Sable Island, Nova Scotia. Her crew were rescued by the steamship City of Brussels (United Kingdom), which put some of her crew aboard. Sultan was on a voyage from Baltimore to Queenstown. She was taken in to Halifax, Nova Scotia, where she arrived on 21 November.
T. E. J.	United Kingdom	The schooner was wrecked at Genoa. Her crew were rescued. She was on a voyage from Mevagissey, Cornwall to Genoa.
Thalassa	United Kingdom	The ship was driven ashore at Constitución, Chile.
Thalia	Germany	The ship was wrecked.
Unicorn	United Kingdom	The brigantine was abandoned off the coast of Ayrshire. Her seven crew were rescued by the Girvan Lifeboat.
Westmoreland	United States	The ship was destroyed by fire at Antwerp.
Unnamed	France	The brig was wrecked off the coast of Essex.
Unnamed	United Kingdom	The brig was driven ashore on Fårö, Sweden.
Unnamed	Imperial Russian Navy	The steamship was driven ashore on Fårö.
