= Lilian Brøgger =

Danish illustrator (born 1950)

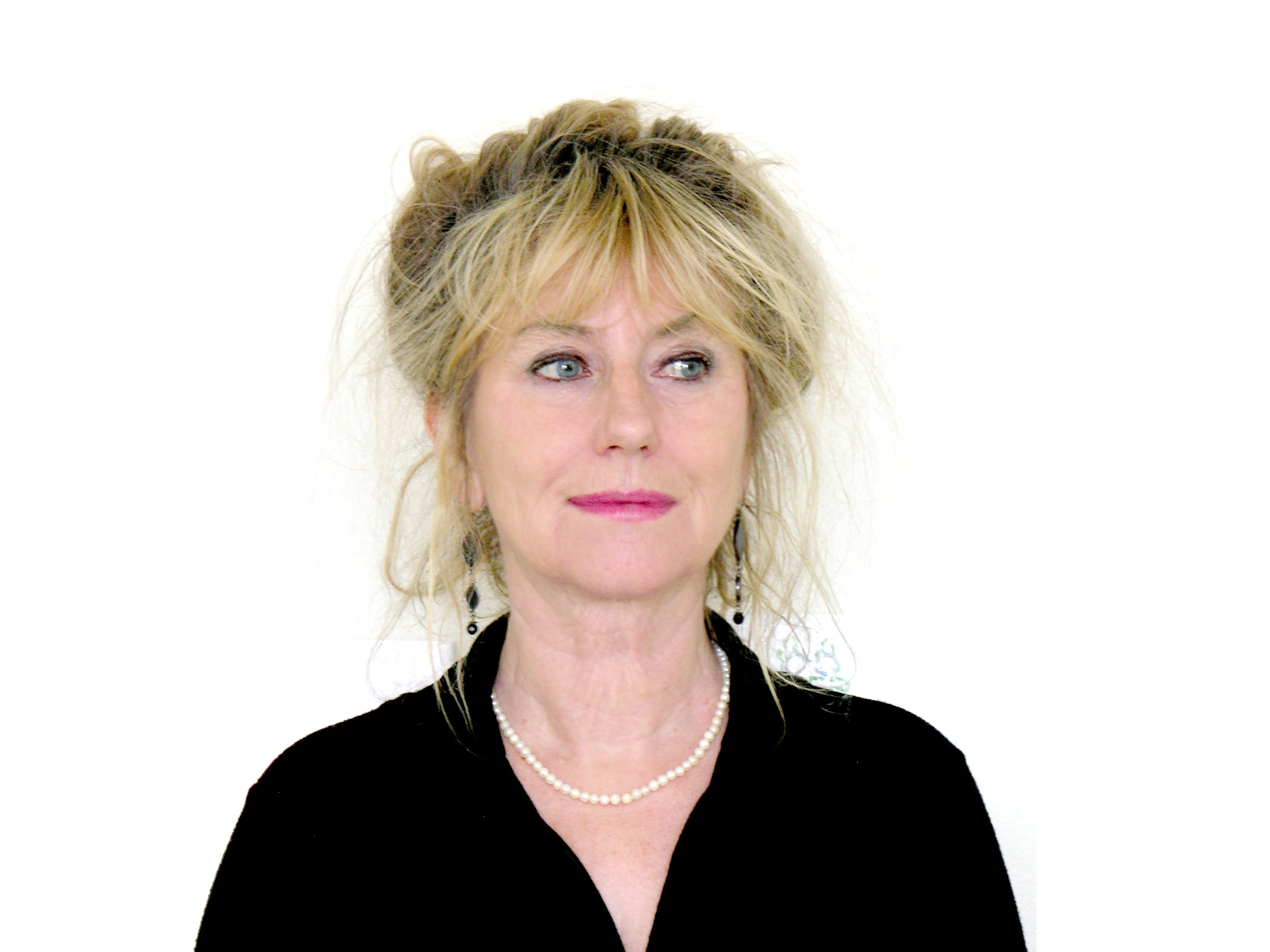
Lilian Brøgger (2010)

Lilian Brøgger (née Brinch; born 1950) is a Danish illustrator known for illustrating children's books.

== Biography ==
Born on 27 January 1950 in Nordby on the Danish island of Fanø, Brøgger was brought up in Copenhagen where she studied at the Danish Design School from 1967 to 1972. She was the first student to graduate as an illustrator from the school. The first work with her illustrations, the 25-page book for small children, Der hvor Linda bor (The Place Where Linda Lives), was published in 1975. She has since illustrated over a hundred books. Much of her artwork is post-modern, and breaks rules of proportions.

In 2002, Brøgger received the Hans Christian Andersen Award for her illustrations in Hjørdis Varmer's biography of Hans Christian Andersen Den fattige dreng fra Odense (The Poor Boy from Odense). It took her more than half a year to create some 100 illustrations consisting of collages, cuttings and drawings, inspired by Andersen's own approach to art. As a result, she became the first illustrator to receive the Danish Writers' Association's H.C. Andersen prize (Dansk Forfatterforenings H.C. Andersen Legat) since it was established in the mid-1950s.

Brøgger received the Forening for Boghaandværks Ærespris (2009) awarded to the person who has contributed most to book development, and Kulturministeriets Illustratorpris (2010) awarded by the Danish Minister of Culture to the artist whose illustrations have most enhanced the written word.
