= Thomas Sneum =

Danish military officer (1917–2007)

Thomas Christian Sneum
- Born: 21 May 1917; Sønderho, Fanø, Denmark
- Died: 3 February 2007 (aged 89); Roskilde, Denmark
- Burial place: Sønderho Cemetery, Fanø
- Military career
- Branch: Royal Danish Air Force; SIS; Free Norwegian Air Force
- Service years: 1937-1945
- Rank: Flight lieutenant
- Awards: King's Medal for Courage

Thomas Christian Sneum (21 May 1917 Fanø - 3 February 2007 Roskilde) was a Danish flight officer who was among the first British agents in Denmark during World War II. His most spectacular achievement was when, in 1941, he photographed two German Freya radar stations on Fanø. In the night of 21–22 June 1941 he and pilot Kjeld Pedersen made a spectacular escape from Denmark to Great Britain in a D.H. Hornet Moth. This would later inspire Ken Follett to write his novel Hornet Flight.

Sneum stated he had planned to assassinate Heinrich Himmler in February 1941 with a longbow from a room in Hotel d'Angleterre, but the plan was cancelled when Himmler failed to appear publicly.
