= List of shipwrecks in November 1845 =

The list of shipwrecks in November 1845 includes ships sunk, foundered, wrecked, grounded, or otherwise lost during November 1845.

== 1 November ==
List of shipwrecks: 1 November 1845
Ship	State	Description
Alpha	(United Kingdom of Great Britain and Ireland) Jersey	The ship struck a sunken rock off Jersey and was damaged. She was on a voyage from Jersey to Anklam, Prussia. She put back to Jersey.
Dispatch	United Kingdom	The ship was driven ashore on "Eniskea". Her crew were rescued.
Emma	United States	The schooner was wrecked at "Novan", Patagonia, Argentina. Three of her crew survived.
Luvius	United Kingdom	The brig was in collision with the steamship Sirius (United Kingdom) and sank in the River Lee near Cork. Her crew survived. Luvius was on a voyage from Newport, Monmouthshire to Cork. She was refloated in the summer of 1846 but sank again. Luvius was refloated in July 1846 and taken in to Cork.
Mathilde	(Russian Empire)	The derelict ship was driven ashore at Sønderho, Denmark.
Union	United Kingdom	The ship ran aground on the Barber Sand, in the North Sea off the coast of Norfolk. She was refloated with assistance from Cawston (United Kingdom).

== 2 November ==
List of shipwrecks: 2 November 1845
Ship	State	Description
Ann	United Kingdom	The ship was driven ashore and wrecked in the Ouelle River with the loss of a crew member. She was on a voyage from Quebec City, Province of Canada, British North America to Plymouth, Devon.
Berudina	Belgium	The ship was driven ashore near Wierum, Friesland, Netherlands. All on board were rescued. She was on a voyage from Bergen, Norway to Antwerp. She subsequently became a wreck.
City of Waterford	United Kingdom	The ship was abandoned in the Atlantic Ocean. Eleven crew were rescued by Dumarest (United Kingdom). City of Waterford was on a voyage from Quebec City to London.
Dispatch	United Kingdom	The ship was driven ashore on "Eirska", County Mayo. Her crew were rescued. She was on a voyage from Westport, County Mayo to Liverpool, Lancashire. She subsequently became a wreck.
European	United Kingdom	The ship was driven ashore and wrecked at Mille Vaches, Province of Canada with the loss of three of her crew. She was on a voyage from Montreal and Quebec City to the Clyde.
Maria de St. Teodoro	Russia	The brig struck the Nada Shoal, off the coast of the Grand Duchy of Tuscany and sank. She was on a voyage from Taganrog to Livorno, Grand Duchy of Tuscany.
Marmora	United States	The steamship caught fire in the Irish Sea. She put in to Cobh, County Cork, United Kingdom, where the fire was extinguished with assistance from HMS Crocodile (Royal Navy). Marmora was on a voyage from Liverpool, Lancashire, United Kingdom to Constantinople, Ottoman Empire.
Moses John	United Kingdom	The ship ran aground on the Borkum Reef, in the North Sea. She was on a voyage from Sunderland, County Durham to Hamburg. She was refloated and put in to Delfzijl, Delfzijl, Netherlands.
Paragon	United Kingdom	The ship ran aground on The Shingles, off the Isle of Wight. She was on a voyage from Moulmein, Burma to London. She was refloated and resumed her voyage.
Thetis	United Kingdom	The ship collided with Jane (United Kingdom) and sank in the River Thames at Gravesend, Kent. Her crew were rescued. She was on a voyage from Woodbridge, Suffolk to London
Venus	United Kingdom	The barque ran aground on the Scroby Sands, Norfolk. She was on a voyage from South Shields, County Durham to London. Venus was refloated but was consequently beached at Great Yarmouth. She was subsequently taken in to Great Yarmouth.

== 3 November ==
List of shipwrecks: 3 November 1845
Ship	State	Description
Ann	United Kingdom	The barque was wrecked in the Saint Lawrence River at Deer's Cave Province of Canada, British North America. She was on a voyage from Plymouth, Devon to Quebec City, Province of Canada.
Berndardus	Kingdom of Hanover	The ship was discovered derelict off Heligoland and was beached in a wrecked condition. She was on a voyage from Newcastle upon Tyne, Northumberland, United Kingdom to Danzig.
Flora McDonald	(United Kingdom of Great Britain and Ireland) British North America	The ship ran aground off Demerara, British Guiana. She was on a voyage from Calais, Nova Scotia to Demerara.
Haidee	United Kingdom	The ship was driven ashore north of Fårö, Sweden and was abandoned by her crew. She was on a voyage from Saint Petersburg, Russia to Leith, Lothian. She was subsequently discovered at sea; it was intended to take her in to "Slitohaven".
Industry	(United Kingdom of Great Britain and Ireland) British North America	The schooner was driven ashore at Quebec City, Province of Canada.
Jane	United Kingdom	The ship ran aground on the Goodwin Sands, Kent. She was on a voyage from Stockton-on-Tees, County Durham to Shoreham-by-Sea, Sussex. She was refloated and resumed her voyage.
Maria Vigilante	(United Kingdom of Great Britain and Ireland) British North America	The schooner was driven ashore at Quebec City.
Sea Bird	United States	The brig was wrecked at "Puretra Negra", Uruguay with the loss of two of her crew.
Trinidad	(United Kingdom of Great Britain and Ireland) British North America	The ship capsized and sank in the Princes Basin, Liverpool, Lancashire.
True Friend	(United Kingdom of Great Britain and Ireland) British North America	The schooner was driven ashore at Quebec City.
Victor	United Kingdom	The brig was driven ashore at Key West, Florida, United States. She was on a voyage from Jamaica to Norfolk, Virginia, United States. She was refloated.

== 4 November ==
List of shipwrecks: 4 November 1845
Ship	State	Description
Adelaide	United Kingdom	The ship was driven ashore and wrecked at Cape Porpoise, Maine, United States. She was on a voyage from Boston, Massachusetts to Windsor, Nova Scotia, British North America.
Caroline	United Kingdom	The ship listed against the quayside and was damaged at Newport, Monmouthshire.
Condottieri	Kingdom of the Two Sicilies	The ship was driven ashore and wrecked west of the Dungeness Lighthouse, Kent, United Kingdom. She was on a voyage from Dordrecht, South Holland, Netherlands to Naples.
Despatch	United Kingdom	The ship was driven ashore and wrecked on "Xirska Island", Ireland. Her crew were rescued. She was on a voyage from Tralee, County Kerry to Westport, County Mayo.
Elizabeth Atkinson	United Kingdom	The ship was wrecked on the Manicougan Shoals. She was on a voyage from Quebec City, Province of Canada, British North America to Hull, Yorkshire.
Helena Christina	Netherlands	The ship ran aground on the west coast of Bali, Netherlands East Indies. She was on a voyage from Surabaya, Netherlands East Indies to Rotterdam, South Holland. She was refloated and put back to Surabaya.
Jane	(United Kingdom of Great Britain and Ireland) British North America	The ship was wrecked between Louisburg and Scatterie Island, Nova Scotia with the loss of all but two of her crew. She was on a voyage from Halifax, Nova Scotia to Newfoundland.
Maria Johanna	Netherlands	The dogger was wrecked at Torrenueva, Spain. Her crew were rescued. She was on a voyage from Cette, Hérault, France to Amsterdam, North Holland.
Ocean Queen	United Kingdom	The ship ran aground and was severely damaged in the Saint Lawrence River at Saguenay, Province of Canada. She was refloated on 7 November and towed in to Quebec City, Province of Canada.
Pico	United States	The ship was driven ashore in Køge Bay. She was on a voyage from Riga, Russia to Boston. She was refloated and put in to Copenhagen, Denmark for repairs.
Reaper	United Kingdom	The ship was driven ashore and wrecked near Mille Vaches, Province of Canada. Her crew were rescued. She was on a voyage from Quebec City to Poole, Dorset.
Rose	United Kingdom	The ship ran aground on the Red Bank, off the Gambia Colony and Protectorate and was abandoned by her crew.
Victory	United Kingdom	The paddle steamer was wrecked north of the entrance of the Agger Canal.

== 5 November ==
List of shipwrecks: 5 November 1845
Ship	State	Description
Antelope	(United Kingdom of Great Britain and Ireland) British North America	The ship was wrecked "on St. Anne's". She was on a voyage from Gaspé to Quebec City, Province of Canada.
Caledonia	United Kingdom	The ship sprang a leak and sank off Port Ellen, Islay. She was on a voyage from Loch Indaal to the Clyde.
Courier du Midi	France	The ship was driven ashore east of the mouth of the Guadiaro. She was on a voyage from Genoa, Kingdom of Sardinia to Bordeaux, Gironde. She was refloated on 9 November and taken in to Gibraltar in a leaky condition.
Falken	Denmark	The ship was driven ashore on Skagen. Her crew were rescued. She was on a voyage from Copenhagen to Flekkefjord, Norway.
Harmonie	Netherlands	The ship departed from "Ulie" for Amsterdam, North Holland. No further trace, presumed foundered with the loss of all hands.
Jane Caldwell	(United Kingdom of Great Britain and Ireland) British North America	The ship was driven ashore and damaged on Bonaventure Island, Province of Canada. She was on a voyage from Halifax, Nova Scotia to Gaspé.
Johnson	(United Kingdom of Great Britain and Ireland) British North America	The ship capsized at Quebec City.
Julie	France	The ship was wrecked on the Les Grones Rocks, Guernsey, Channel Islands. Her crew were rescued.
Lark	United Kingdom	The sloop was driven ashore crewless on Pladda. The body of a crew member came ashore the next day.
Lambertus	Stralsund	The ship struck a sunken wreck and foundered in the Baltic Sea off Stolpemünde, Prussia. She was on a voyage from Königsberg, Prussia to Leith, Lothian, United Kingdom.
Margaret	(United Kingdom of Great Britain and Ireland) British North America	The ship was wrecked south west of the Green Island Lighthouse, Province of Canada with the loss of all hands.
Mary	United Kingdom	The ship was wrecked on the American coast. She was on a voyage from London to Saint Andrews, New Brunswick, British North America.
Thornby	United Kingdom	The ship was driven ashore on Skagen. Her crew were rescued. She was on a voyage from Saint Petersburg, Russia to Hull, Yorkshire.
Twe Gebruders	Prussia	The ship was driven ashore and sank at Leba.
Union	United Kingdom	The ship was driven ashore on Skagen. Her crew were rescued. She was on a voyage from Stettin to Grangemouth, Stirlingshire. Union was refloated on 14 November and put in to Fredrikshavn.
Wave	United Kingdom	The ship was driven ashore on Skagen. Her crew were rescued. She was on a voyage from Riga, Russia to Kirkwall, Orkney Islands. She was refloated on 10 November and put in to Frederikshavn.

== 6 November ==
List of shipwrecks: 6 November 1845
Ship	State	Description
Ellen	United Kingdom	The ship was wrecked on the Sizewell Bank, in the North Sea off the coast of Suffolk. Her crew were rescued. She was on a voyage from Stockton on Tees, County Durham to London.
European	United Kingdom	The ship ran aground in the Kattegat off "Hornbeck". She was on a voyage from Danzig to London. She was refloated and put in to Helsingør, Denmark.
Fortuna	Norway	The ship was driven ashore and wrecked on Skagen, Denmark. She was on a voyage from Flekkefjord to Copenhagen, Denmark.
Frau Antje	Hamburg	The ship was wrecked at "Eitzenlock". Her crew were rescued.
Mariner	(United Kingdom of Great Britain and Ireland) South Australia	The ship was wrecked at Coorong. All on board were rescued. She was on a voyage from Port Phillip to Adelaide.
Neptunus	Sweden	The ship was wrecked on the Skagen Reef. Her crew were rescued. She was on a voyage from Härnösand to Marseille, Bouches-du-Rhône, France.

== 7 November ==
List of shipwrecks: 7 November 1845
Ship	State	Description
Amelia	Portugal	The brig was severely damaged in a squall at Lisbon.
Eagle	United States	The schooner was lost near Wood Island. Crew saved.
Electra	United Kingdom	The ship ran aground in the River Trent 15 nautical miles (28 km) downstream of Gainsborough, Lincolnshire.
Elizabeth	United Kingdom	The ship collided with a collier and sank in the River Thames. She was on a voyage from London to Schiedam, South Holland, Netherlands.
Gazelle	France	The brig was severely damaged in a squall at Lisbon.
Hero	United Kingdom	The ship was driven ashore and severely damaged 1.5 nautical miles (2.8 km) west of Fraserburgh, Aberdeenshire. Her crew were rescued. She was on a voyage from Riga, Russia to Dundee, Forfarshire.
Mariner	(United Kingdom of Great Britain and Ireland) New South Wales	The ship was driven ashore and wrecked at Coorong, South Australia. All on board were rescued.
Symmetry	United Kingdom	The ship was wrecked on Gotland, Sweden. Her crew were rescued.
Waterlily	United Kingdom	The brig was severely damaged in a squall at Lisbon.
Waverley	United Kingdom	The ship was severely damaged in a squall at Lisbon.
William IV	United Kingdom	The brig was severely damaged in a squall at Lisbon.

== 8 November ==
List of shipwrecks: 8 November 1845
Ship	State	Description
Jargaren	Sweden	The ship was driven ashore near Umeå. She was on a voyage from Stockholm to Piteåa.
Thetis	United Kingdom	The ship collided with Jane (United Kingdom) and sank in the River Thames near Gravesend, Kent, Her crew were rescued. She was on a voyage from Woodbridge, Suffolk to London.

== 9 November ==
List of shipwrecks: 9 November 1845
Ship	State	Description
Criterion	United Kingdom	The ship ran aground on the Corton Sands, in the North Sea off the coast of Suffolk. She was refloated and was taken in to Lowestoft, Suffolk in a leaky condition.
Edward	United Kingdom	The ship was driven ashore and damaged on Guernsey, Channel Islands. She was refloated.

== 10 November ==
List of shipwrecks: 10 November 1845
Ship	State	Description
British Queen	United Kingdom	The ship was driven ashore on the American coast. She was on a voyage from Halifax, Nova Scotia to Charlottetown, Prince Edward Island, British North America. She was consequently condemned.
Cato	(United Kingdom of Great Britain and Ireland) British North America	The ship was wrecked on Ten Pound Island, Massachusetts, United States. Her crew were rescued.
Elsina	Netherlands	The ship was wrecked between "Arve" and Langeland, Denmark. Her crew were rescued. She was on a voyage from Randers, Denmark to Amsterdam, North Holland.
Gander	United Kingdom	The ship was wrecked near Liverpool, Nova Scotia. Her crew were rescued. She was on a voyage from Boston, Massachusetts to Halifax, Nova Scotia.
Lady Anne	United Kingdom	The ship capsized in the River Usk at Newport, Monmouthshire. She was righted.

== 11 November ==
List of shipwrecks: 11 November 1845
Ship	State	Description
Caroline	France	The ship was wrecked at Île Bourbon. Her crew were rescued. She was on a voyage from Coringa, India to Havre de Grâce, Seine-Inférieure.
Olympe	France	The ship ran ashore at Guadeloupe. She was on a voyage from Cherbourg, Seine-Inférieure to Guadeloupe. She was refloated and put in to Martinique.
Princess	United Kingdom	The ship was dismasted off the Redhead. She was subsequently abandoned with the loss of a crew member. Survivors were rescued by Kingston (United Kingdom).
Wandering Shepherd	United Kingdom	The ship ran aground on the Swine Bottoms, off the coast of Denmark. She was on a voyage from Windau, Prussia to Newcastle upon Tyne, Northumberland. She was refloated on 13 November and taken in to Copenhagen for repairs.

== 12 November ==
List of shipwrecks: 12 November 1845
Ship	State	Description
Heinrich	Flag unknown	The galeass was driven ashore on "Sandskars Holm". She was on a voyage from Saint Petersburg to Riga, Russia.
Lady Sale	United Kingdom	The ship ran aground at Penang, Straits Settlements. She was on a voyage from Hong Kong to Calcutta, India. She was refloated the next day and resumed her voyage on 22 November.
Louise Amelia	Flag unknown	The ship was holed by ice and sank off Kronstadt, Russia. Her crew were rescued.
Mary	United Kingdom	The schooner was driven ashore in North Bay, County Wexford. She was on a voyage from Liverpool, Lancashire to Cork. She was refloated the next day and resumed her voyage.
Norval	United Kingdom	The ship was driven ashore at Deerness, Orkney Islands. She was on a voyage from Copenhagen, Denmark to Newfoundland, British North America.
Pursuit	United Kingdom	The schooner ran aground on the Scarp, off South Shields, County Durham. She was refloated the next day.

== 13 November ==
List of shipwrecks: 13 November 1845
Ship	State	Description
Catharina Maria	Kingdom of Hanover	The koff was driven ashore in a capsized condition at Egersund, Norway. She was subsequently towed in to Stavanger.
Cygnet	United Kingdom	The ship ran aground off Current Island, Bermuda. She was on a voyage from Nassau, Bahamas to Halifax, Nova Scotia, British North America. She was refloated and put back to Nassau.
St. Gregory	Russia	The ship was wrecked on Nordkapp, Norway. Her crew survived. She was on a voyage from Arkhangelsk to Amsterdam, North Holland, Netherlands.
Symmetry	United Kingdom	The ship was wrecked on the Sailor Reef, in the Baltic Sea off the coast of Gotland Sweden. She was on a voyage from Saint Petersburg, Russia to Hull, Yorkshire.
Velocity	United Kingdom	The steamship ran aground on the Sparrow Hawk Sand, in the North Sea. She was refloated and taken in to South Shields, County Durham.

== 14 November ==
List of shipwrecks: 14 November 1845
Ship	State	Description
Deft	United Kingdom	The ship collided with the steamship Sirius (United Kingdom) and foundered off Deal, Kent. Her crew were rescued by Mary (United Kingdom). Deft was on a voyage from Blyth, Northumberland to Caen, Calvados, France.
Glasgow or Port Glasgow	United Kingdom	The schooner was severely damaged by fire at Whitby, Yorkshire.

== 15 November ==
List of shipwrecks: 15 November 1845
Ship	State	Description
Frederick	Denmark	The sloop was driven ashore and wrecked near Brouwershaven, Zeeland, Netherlands. Her crew were rescued.
Mantura	United Kingdom	The ship ran aground on the Barber Sand, in the North Sea off the coast of Norfolk. She was refloated and beached at Bacton, Norfolk.
Zelumah	United Kingdom	The ship was wrecked on the Carysfort Reef. Her crew were rescued. She was on a voyage from Liverpool, Lancashire to Havana, Cuba.

== 16 November ==
List of shipwrecks: 16 November 1845
Ship	State	Description
City of London	United Kingdom	The paddle steamer ran aground on the Gunfleet Sand, in the North Sea off the coast of Essex. She was refloated with assistance from HMRC Scout ( Board of Customs) and four smacks, including Aurora's Increase, Endeavour and Fox (all United Kingdom). Two crew from Fox were killed.
Eagle	United Kingdom	The smack was driven ashore and wrecked at Greenan Castle, near Ayr. Her crew were rescued. She was on a voyage from Stranraer, Wigtownshire to Ayr.
Favourite	United States	The ship was driven ashore at Messina, Sicily.
Henry	(United Kingdom of Great Britain and Ireland) New Zealand	The schooner was wrecked at the mouth of the Manawatu River. Her crew were rescued.
Jane	United Kingdom	The sloop was driven ashore south of Irvine, Ayrshire.
Johan Frederick	Netherlands	The galiot was driven onto rocks at Redcar, Yorkshire, United Kingdom and sank. Her crew were rescued. She was on a voyage from London to Hartlepool, County Durham, United Kingdom.
London	United Kingdom	The schooner ran aground on the Andrews Sand, in the North Sea off the coast of Essex. She was refloated with the assistance of HMRC Desmond ( Board of Customs) and two smacks and taken in to Harwich, Essex. She was on a voyage from London to Boston, Lincolnshire.
Maria Jane	United Kingdom	The ship was driven ashore at Messina.
Neptunus	Hamburg	The ship foundered off Aalesund, Norway.

== 17 November ==
List of shipwrecks: 17 November 1845
Ship	State	Description
Alexandrina	United Kingdom	The ship was driven ashore near Havre de Grâce, Seine-Inférieure, France. She was refloated on 28 November and taken in to Havre de Grâce.
Ebor	United Kingdom	The barque was driven ashore at Montrose, Forfarshire. She was on a voyage from Quebec City, Province of Canada, British North America to Montrose.
Era	United Kingdom	The schooner was driven ashore near Tarifa, Spain. She was on a voyage from Smyrna, Ottoman Empire to Liverpool, Lancashire. She was refloated and resumed her voyage.
London	United Kingdom	The ship ran aground on the Andrews Sand, in the North Sea off the coast of Essex. She was on a voyage from London to Boston, Lincolnshire. She was refloated.

== 18 November ==
List of shipwrecks: 18 November 1845
Ship	State	Description
Amelia	United Kingdom	The ship ran aground on the Barber Sand, in the North Sea off the coast of Norfolk. She was refloated and anchored off Great Yarmouth.
Columbus	United Kingdom	The ship was driven ashore near Helsingør, Denmark. She was on a voyage from Saint Petersburg, Russia to Leith, Lothian. She was refloated.
Done	United Kingdom	The brig was wrecked on the Kentish Knock. Her crew were rescued.
Elizabeth	United Kingdom	The schooner was driven ashore and wrecked at Arbroath, Forfarshire.
Oberon	Sweden	The ship was driven ashore and wrecked on Læsø, Denmark. She was on a voyage from Kristianstad to Genoa, Kingdom of Sardinia.
Orus	Russia	The ship was wrecked on Sandhammaren.
Parsee	India	The ship was wrecked on "Bintang Island, Netherlands East Indies. She was on a voyage from Bombay to Shanghai, China.
St. Louis	France	The ship was wrecked on the Chasseron Bank. Her crew were rescued. She was on a voyage from Newcastle upon Tyne, Northumberland, United Kingdom to Bordeaux, Gironde.

== 19 November ==
List of shipwrecks: 19 November 1845
Ship	State	Description
Jane and Ellen	United Kingdom	The ship was driven ashore west of Wells-next-the-Sea, Norfolk. She was refloated the next day and taken in to Wells-next-the-Sea.
J. Grunau	Elbing	The ship struck a sunken wreck off Skagen, Denmark and was abandoned by her six crew, who were rescued by Preciosa ( Greifswald). Graunau was on a voyage from Bristol, Gloucestershire, united Kingdom to Elbing.
Liverpool Packet	United Kingdom	The ship was driven ashore and wrecked at Peterhead, Aberdeenshire. She was on a voyage from Aberdeen to Glasgow, Renfrewshire.
Mary Henney	United Kingdom	The ship was driven ashore and severely damaged at Bowmore, Islay, Inner Hebrides. Her crew were rescued.
Mayflower	United Kingdom	The ship foundered off Ballyhalbert, County Down. Her crew were rescued.
Ouse	United Kingdom	The schooner was driven ashore near Wells-next-the-Sea. She was refloated and resumed her voyage to London.
Sisters	United Kingdom	The schooner was driven ashore near Wells-next-the-Sea. She was on a voyage from Inverkeithing, Fife to Rouen, Seine-Inférieure, France. Sisters was refloated and put in to Blakeney, Norfolk.
St. Gregory	Russia	The ship was wrecked near Nordkapp, Norway with the loss of her captain. She was on a voyage from Arkhangelsk, Russia to Amsterdam, North Holland, Netherlands.

== 20 November ==
List of shipwrecks: 20 November 1845
Ship	State	Description
Charlotte	Denmark	The ship was driven ashore at Ringkøbing.
Eliza and Ann, or Eliza and Nancy	United Kingdom	The ship ran aground on the Pennington Spit, off the Isle of Wight. She was on a voyage from Youghal, County Cork to London. She was refloated on 23 November.
Hopewell	United Kingdom	The ship was driven ashore in St. Tudwal's Islands.
Juffer Ebels	Prussia	The ship was wrecked between "Konduin" and Workum, Friesland, Netherlands. She was on a voyage from Königsberg to Amsterdam, North Holland, Netherlands.
Marie Catherine	France	The ship was wrecked on the coast of Portugal with some loss of life. She was on a voyage from Cette, Hérault to Rouen, Seine-Inférieure.
Republicano	Argentina	Anglo-French Blockade of the River Plate, Battle of Vuelta de Obligado: The brigantine caught fire, exploded and sank in a battle with HMS Dolphin (Royal Navy).

== 21 November ==
List of shipwrecks: 21 November 1845
Ship	State	Description
Freden	Sweden	The wrecked ship was driven ashore at Thisted, Denmark.
Royal George	United Kingdom	The ship ran aground on the Foreness Rock, Margate, Kent. She was on a voyage from Newry, County Antrim to London. She was refloated.
Telumah	United Kingdom	The ship was wrecked north of Cedar Creek, Florida. Her crew were rescued. She was on a voyage from Liverpool, Lancashire to Havana, Cuba.

== 22 November ==
List of shipwrecks: 22 November 1845
Ship	State	Description
Johan Herman	Netherlands	The ship ran aground off Ameland, Friesland. She was on a voyage from Randers, Denmark to Amsterdam, North Holland.
Lady Cremorne	United Kingdom	The ship ran aground on the Trinity Sand, in the North Sea off the coast of Lincolnshire. She was on a voyage from South Shields, County Durham to London. She was refloated and put in to Grimsby in a leay condition.
Xenophon	United States	The ship was destroyed by fire off Sag Harbor, New York.

== 23 November ==
List of shipwrecks: 23 November 1845
Ship	State	Description
Breakwater	United Kingdom	The ship was wrecked off Carsethorn, Kirkcudbrightshire with the loss of both crew. She was on a voyage from the River Nith to Maryport, Cumberland.
Hermanna	Stettin	The ship was driven ashore on Terschelling, Friesland, Netherlands and was abandoned by her crew. She was on a voyage from Stettin to Amsterdam, North Holland, Netherlands.
Maid of Mona	United Kingdom	The ship was wrecked on Île de l'Est, Crozet Islands. Her crew were rescued.
Royal Oak	United Kingdom	The ship was driven ashore at Ayr. She was refloated the next day. She was refloated on 24 November.
Symmetry	United Kingdom	The brig was driven ashore and wrecked on Dragør, Denmark.
Tyro	(United Kingdom of Great Britain and Ireland) British North America	The ship was driven ashore and wrecked at Sandy Point, Nova Scotia. She was on a voyage from Halifax, Nova Scotia to Saint John, New Brunswick.

== 24 November ==
List of shipwrecks: 24 November 1845
Ship	State	Description
Cettois	United Kingdom	The ship was wrecked at Algiers, Algeria with the loss of two of her crew. She had been refloated and towed in to Algiers by 3 December.
Clio	United Kingdom	The ship was wrecked on the Longsand, in the North Sea off the coast of Essex. Her crew were rescued by Louisa and Unity (both United Kingdom). She was on a voyage from Newcastle upon Tyne, Northumberland to Marseille, Bouches-du-Rhône, France.
Los Niños	Spain	The ship was driven ashore and wrecked at "Bateken", Norway. She was on a voyage from Bergen, Norway to Barcelona.
Lowland Lass	United Kingdom	The collier was in collision with William (United Kingdom) and foundered. Her crew were rescued. She was on a voyage from South Shields, County Durham to Honfleur, Calvados, France.

== 25 November ==
List of shipwrecks: 25 November 1845
Ship	State	Description
Bayfield	United Kingdom	The ship was struck by lightning and was set on fire in the Atlantic Ocean. She was abandoned as she was carrying 30 tons of gunpowder. Three of her crew subsequently died before the survivors landed on the coast of Sierra Leone. She was on a voyage from Liverpool, Lancashire to Bombay, India.
Henry	United Kingdom	The ship was in collision with Champion (United Kingdom) and foundered in the North Sea off Flamborough Head, Yorkshire. Her crew were rescued.
Mary Ann	United Kingdom	The fishing smack was driven ashore and wrecked at Abbotsbury, Dorset. Her crew were rescued.
Neptunus	Netherlands	The ship was driven ashore on the coast of Jutland. Her crew were rescued. She was on a voyage from Amsterdam, North Holland to Newcastle upon Tyne, Northumberland, United Kingdom.
Sally	United Kingdom	The smack foundered off Strumble Head, Pembrokeshire. Her crew were rescued. She was on a voyage from Milford Haven, Pembrokeshire to Cardiff, Glamorgan.
Wanskapen	(Russian Empire) Grand Duchy of Finland	The ship ran aground on the Sunk Sand, in the Humber. She was on a voyage from Oulu to Hull, East Riding of Yorkshire, United Kingdom.

== 26 November ==
List of shipwrecks: 26 November 1845
Ship	State	Description
Anthony and Ann	United Kingdom	The ship was driven ashore and wrecked near Sturnuden Point, Grand Duchy of Finland. Her crew were rescued.
Astrea	United Kingdom	The ship was driven ashore and wrecked near Karlskrona, Sweden. She was on a voyage from Riga, Russia to Sheerness, Kent. She had been refloated by 10 December and taken to a place of safety.
Bartlett	(United Kingdom of Great Britain and Ireland) Jersey	The ship ran aground on the Haisborough Sands, in the North Sea off the coast of Norfolk. She was refloated but consequently foundered off the Cockle Lightship ( Trinity House). Her crew were rescued. Bartlett was on a voyage from Dublin to Wells-next-the-Sea, Norfolk.
Carmen	Norway	The ship was driven ashore at Nettlestone, Isle of Wight. She was on a voyage from Bergen to Portsmouth, Hampshire, United Kingdom. She was refloated and taken in to Portsmouth in a leaky condition.
Henry	United Kingdom	The ship collided with Champion (United Kingdom and foundered off Flamborough Head, Yorkshire. Her crew were rescued.
John and Joseph	United Kingdom	The ship was driven ashore and wrecked at Breaksea Point, Glamorgan. Her crew were rescued. She was on a voyage from Newport, Monmouthshire to Seville, Spain.
John Gilbert	United Kingdom	The ship was driven ashore at Helsingør, Denmark. She was on a voyage from Saint Petersburg, Russia to Dundee, Forfarshire.
Pryde	United Kingdom	The ship was driven ashore and wrecked near Belmullet, County Mayo with the loss of a crew member. She was on a voyage from London to Westport, County Mayo.
Rothschild	United Kingdom	The ship sprang a leakd and was beached at "Lessoe". She was on a voyage from Genot, Grand Duchy of Tuscany to Naples, Kingdom of the Two Sicilies.

== 27 November ==
List of shipwrecks: 27 November 1845
Ship	State	Description
Anne Sophia	United Kingdom	The ship was wrecked on a reef off "Cartall Island", Ottoman Empire. Her crew were rescued. She was on a voyage from Taganrog, Russia to Liverpool, Lancashire.
De Hoop	Netherlands	The ship was driven ashore and wrecked between Neath and Port Talbot, Glamorgan, United Kingdom. She was on a voyage from Surinam to Amsterdam, North Holland.
Eliza	United Kingdom	The schooner was damaged by fire and beached at Great Yarmouth, Norfolk. She was on a voyage from Goole, Yorkshire to London. Eliza was refloated and towed in to Great Yarmouth.
Hoffnung	Hamburg	The ship was driven ashore north of "Laling", Duchy of Holstein. She was on a voyage from Hamburg to Dunkirk, Nord.
London	United Kingdom	The ship ran aground on the Shearweathers, in the River Avon. She was on a voyage from Richibucto, New Brunswick, British North America to Gloucester. She was refloated and beached at Pill, Somerset for repairs.
Maria Caroline	Prussia	The ship was driven ashore and wrecked 15 nautical miles (28 km) north of Memel. She was on a voyage from Pillau to Memel.
New Brunswick	United Kingdom	The barque was driven ashore on Skagen, Denmark. She was on a voyage from Saint Petersburg, Russia to Hull, Yorkshire.

== 28 November ==
List of shipwrecks: 28 November 1845
Ship	State	Description
Herald	United Kingdom	The ship was driven ashore near Cape Forchu, Nova Scotia, British North America. She was on a voyage from Boston, Massachusetts, United States to Halifax, Nova Scotia.
Lara	United Kingdom	The ship was driven ashore on Mutton Island, County Galway. Her crew were rescued. She was on a voyage from Newcastle upon Tyne, Northumberland to Galway.
Lord Nelson	United Kingdom	The steamship ran aground on the Vinegar Middle Sand, in The Wash.
Squirrel	United Kingdom	The ship was driven ashore and wrecked at Formby, Lancashire. Her crew were rescued. She was on a voyage from Youghal, County Cork to Liverpool, Lancashire.

== 29 November ==
List of shipwrecks: 29 November 1845
Ship	State	Description
Active	United Kingdom	The schooner foundered off Copeland Island, County Down. Her crew were rescued by a steamship. She was on a voyage from Maryport, Cumberland to Belfast, County Antrim.
Blakeney and Hull Packet	United Kingdom	The ship sank at Hull, Yorkshire. She was on a voyage from Blakeney, Norfolk to Hull.
Curlew	United Kingdom	The ship was wrecked in the Gut of Canso. She was on a voyage from Prince Edward Island, British North America to Boston, Massachusetts, United States.
Hermann	Stettin	The ship struck a sunken rock and sank in "Sotepfiord", Norway. She was on a voyage from an English port to Stettin.
Jupiter	United Kingdom	The ship was driven ashore near Sunderland, County Durham. She was refloated and taken in to Sunderland.
Royalist	United Kingdom	The ship was driven ashore and severely damaged at Lytham St. Annes, Lancashire. She was on a voyage from Quebec City, Province of Canada, British North America to Lytham St. Annes.
Ruby	United Kingdom	The ship ran aground off "Iversted", on the Baltic coast. Her crew were rescued by a lifeboat. She was on a voyage from Ventava, Courland Governorate to Newcastle upon Tyne, Northumberland.
Parsee; Sir James Carnac	India	The steamships were in collision and one of them sank. All on board were rescued.
Sultana	United Kingdom	The ship was driven ashore at Gårdby, Sweden. She was on a voyage from Riga, Russia to Liverpool, Lancashire.
Superb	Sweden	The barque was driven ashore on the east coast of "Holmo". She was on a voyage from the Mediterranean to Nye Carleby.
Williams	United Kingdom	The schooner was wrecked on the Elbow End Bank, off the mouth of the River Tay with the loss of two of her five crew.

== 30 November ==
List of shipwrecks: 30 November 1845
Ship	State	Description
Concordia	United Kingdom	The ship was in collision with a brig and was abandoned off the Dudgeon Lightship ( Trinity House). Her crew were rescued by a fishing smack. She was on a voyage from Teignmouth, Devon to Newcastle upon Tyne, Northumberland.
Evenwood	United Kingdom	The ship was driven ashore crewless in Loch Curloway, Lewis, Outer Hebrides. She was on a voyage from Quebec City, Province of Canada to Liverpool, Lancashire. She became a wreck on 8 December.
Express	United Kingdom	The ship ran aground on the Sunk Sand, in the North Sea off the coast of Essex. She was on a voyage from Stockton-on-Tees, County Durham to London. She was refloated and resumed her voyage.
John Frederick	United Kingdom	The ship was in collision with the brig Elizabeth (United Kingdom) and foundered in the North Sea off the coast of Suffolk. Her crew were rescued by Elizabeth.
Lady Faversham	United Kingdom	The barque ran aground and was wrecked on the Insand, in the North Sea off the coast of County Durham. The wreck was dispersed by explosives on 14 April 1866.
Noluna	United Kingdom	The ship ran aground on the Doom Bar. She was on a voyage from Restigouche, New Brunswick, British North America to Padstow, Cornwall. She was refloated and taken in to Padstow.
Pedestrian	United Kingdom	The ship ran aground on the Sizewell Bank, in the North Sea off the coast of Suffolk. She was on a voyage from South Shields, County Durham to London. She was refloated and put in to Great Yarmouth, Norfolk.
Five Sostre	Denmark	The ship was driven ashore near "Danholm", Sweden. Her crew were rescued. She was on a voyage from Newcastle upon Tyne to Copenhagen.
Thomas Edward	(United Kingdom of Great Britain and Ireland) British North America	The ship was wrecked on the Cow Ledge, in the Grand Passage. Her crew were rescued. She was on a voyage from Saint John, New Brunswick to Halifax, Nova Scotia.
Wassily Adrianople	Russia	The brig was driven ashore near "Tolbuchin".

== Unknown date ==
List of shipwrecks: Unknown date in November 1845
Ship	State	Description
Abeona	United Kingdom	The ship was abandoned in the Atlantic Ocean 200 nautical miles (370 km) west of Cape Clear Island, County Donegal before 15 November. Her crew were rescued by Cromwell (United Kingdom). Abeona was on a voyage from Quebec City, Province of Canada, British North America to Waterford. She subsequently came ashore between Hartland Point and Sharpnose, Devon.
Agatha	United Kingdom	The ship ran aground off Sønderho, Denmark and was wrecked.
Amity	Netherlands	The ship foundered in the Baltic Sea off Rügen, Prussia before 3 November.
Ann	United Kingdom	The ship was lost off Domesnes, Norway.
Calenlo	Flag unknown	The brig was driven ashore and wrecked at "Tabasco" before 12 November.
Caroline	Norway	The ship was abandoned in the North Sea off Heligoland before 13 November.
Dove	United Kingdom	The brig was wrecked on the Kentish Knock. Her crew were rescued.
Eliza Ann	United Kingdom	The ship was wrecked near Cape Chat, Province of Canada. She was on a voyage from Quebec City to Cork.
Familien	Netherlands	The ship foundered in the North Sea. She was on a voyage from Ebeltoft, Denmark to Amsterdam.
Force	United Kingdom	The ship was driven ashore and wrecked 14 leagues (42 nautical miles (78 km)) north of Lisbon, Portugal.
Gaspé Packet	(United Kingdom of Great Britain and Ireland) British North America	The ship was wrecked on the Red Island Reef before 10 November with the loss of all but one of her crew. She was on a voyage from Richibucto, New Brunswick to Quebec City.
Hannah	(United Kingdom of Great Britain and Ireland) New South Wales	The ship foundered off North Cape, New Zealand. She was on a voyage from Port Nicholson, New Zealand to Sydney.
Harriet and Jane	United Kingdom	The ship ran aground on Hamilton's Bank, in the Solent.
Harrison	United Kingdom	The ship was abandoned in the Atlantic Ocean before 16 November.
Hersey	United Kingdom	The ship was driven ashore on Borkum, Kingdom of Hanover before 6 November.
Jane Charlotte	(United Kingdom of Great Britain and Ireland)	The schooner was abandoned in the Atlantic Ocean before 21 November.
Janet	United Kingdom	The ship capsized and sank off Skagen, Denmark. She was on a voyage from Nakskov, Denmark to London. She was refloated on 30 May 1846 and taken in to Aalborg.
Jonge Antje	Kingdom of Hanover	The ship was driven ashore at Thorup, Denmark before 14 November. She was on a voyage from "Besig" to Emden.
Julia	United Kingdom	The ship foundered off Shapinsay, Orkney Islands before 3 November.
Lord Glenelg	United Kingdom	The ship ran aground in the North Sea before 20 November. She was refloated and taken in to Cuxhaven.
Louise	United Kingdom	The ship was driven ashore at the mouth of the River Tay. She was on a voyage from Brevig, Norway to Grangemouth, Stirlingshire. She was refloated on 15 November and taken in to Dundee, Forfarshire.
Margaret Boyle	United Kingdom	The ship was wrecked in the Gulf of Finland. She was on a voyage from Saint Petersburg, Russia to Leith, Lothian.
Maria	United Kingdom	The ship was driven ashore near "Kamarouska", British North America before 10 November. She was on a voyage from Quebec City to Milford Haven, Pembrokeshire. She was refloated and put back to Quebec City.
Maria	Russia	The ship ran aground on the Bredgrund and was severely damaged. She had been refloated and towed in to Copenhagen, Denmark by 29 November.
Neptune	United States	The ship was abandoned before 1 December. Her crew were rescued by Henry (France). Neptune was on a voyage from Stockholm, Sweden to New Orleans, Louisiana.
Packet	United Kingdom	The ship was abandoned in the Atlantic Ocean before 16 November. She was on a voyage from Port-au-Prince, Haiti to an English port.
Perle	United Kingdom	The ship was driven ashore on Skagen. She was refloated on 26 November but was consequently beached at "Olveron" with the intention of later taking her in to Gothenburg, Sweden. She was on a voyage from Middlesbrough, Yorkshire to Stettin.
Sally and Susannah	United Kingdom	The schooner was driven ashore at Felixtowe, Suffolk. She was refloated with assistance from HMRC Royal Charlotte ( Board of Customs).
Sea Nymph	United Kingdom	The barque foundered in the Atlantic Ocean off the coast of Ireland before 6 November.
Surat	United States	The ship was wrecked off Anjer, Spanish East Indies before 8 November. She was on a voyage from Manila, Spanish East Indies to an American port.
Three Johns	United Kingdom	The ship was driven ashore at Harwich, Essex before 4 November and was refloated on that date.
Torderson	Flag unknown	The ship was driven ashore at Stromness, Orkney Islands. She was refloated on 7 November.
Vertruer	Danzig	The ship was driven ashore at "Valunems". She was on a voyage from Danzig to Liverpool, Lancashire, United Kingdom. She was refloated and towed in to Stornoway, Isle of Lewis, Outer Hebrides for repairs, arriving on 14 November.
William	United Kingdom	The ship was driven ashore at "Kamarouska", British North America before 10 November. She was on a voyage from Quebec City to Ardrossan, Ayrshire. She was refloated and put back to Quebec City.
William and Charlotte	(United Kingdom of Great Britain and Ireland) British North America	The ship was abandoned in the Atlantic Ocean before 30 November.
