= Listed buildings in Fanø Municipality =

Historic structures in Denmark

This is a list of listed buildings in Fanø Municipality, Denmark.

Note:: This list is incomplete. A complete list og listed buildings in Fanø Municipality can be found on Danish Wikipedia.

== The list ==
Listing name	Image	Location	Coordinates	Description
Barkvej 5		Barkvej 5, 6720 Fanø		
Barkvej 7		Barkvej 7, 6720 Fanø		
Barkvej 9		Barkvej 9, 6720 Fanø		
Bjerrevej 10		Bjerrevej 10, 6720 Fanø		
Bjerrevej 11		Bjerrevej 10, 6720 Fanø		
Digevej 4		Digevej 4, 6720 Fanø		
Digevej 6		Digevej 6, 6720 Fanø		
Digevej 19		Digevej 19, 6720 Fanø		
Digevej 23		Digevej 23, 6720 Fanø		
Digevej 25		Digevej 25, 6720 Fanø		
Gammel Byvej 4		Gammel Byvej 4, 6720 Fanø		
Gammel Byvej 10		Gammel Byvej 10, 6720 Fanø		
Gammel Byvej 12		Gammel Byvej 12, 6720 Fanø		
Gammel Byvej 14		Gammel Byvej 14, 6720 Fanø		
Hannes Hus		Øster Land 7, 6720 Fanø		
Hovedgaden 41-43		Hovedgaden 41, 6720 Fanø		
Sønderho Poorhouse		Kåvervej 31, 6720 Fanø		
