= Tove Birkelund =

Danish geologist (1928–1986)

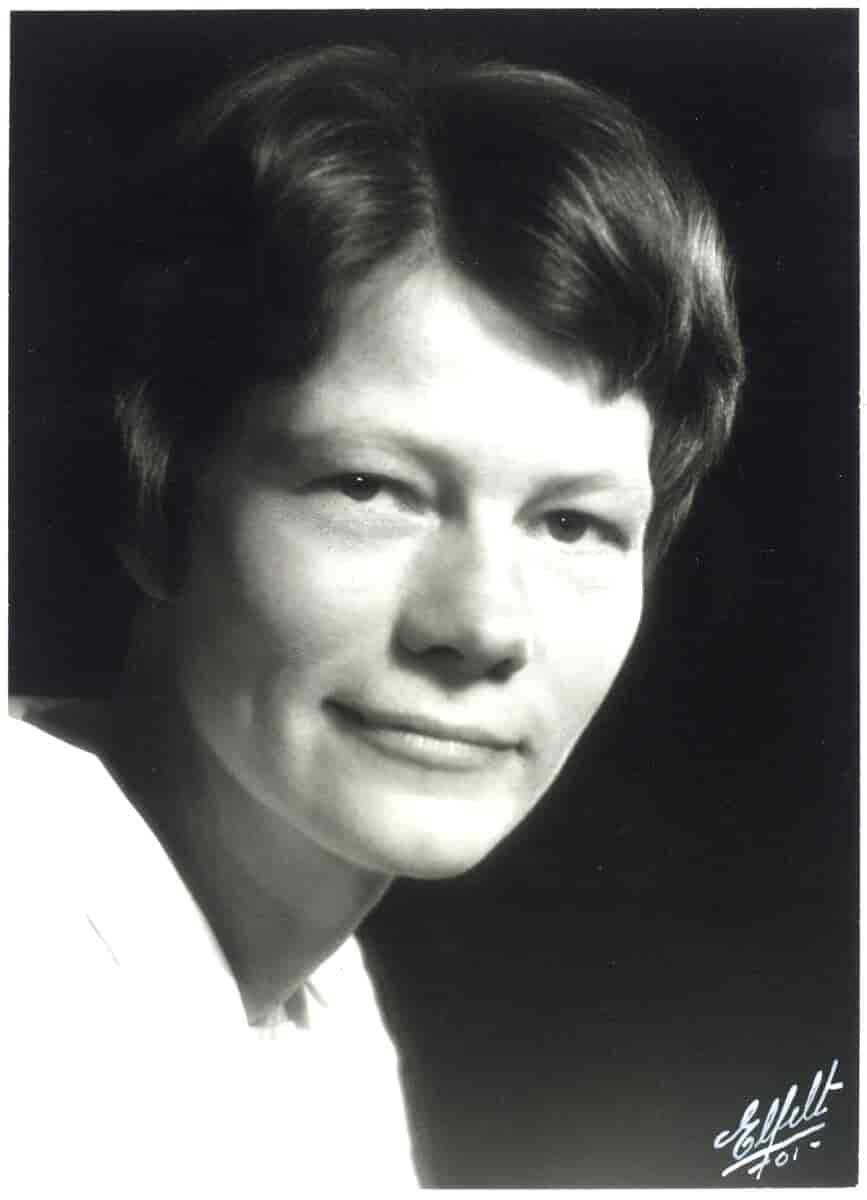
- Tove Birkelund
- Born: 28 November 1928; Nordby, Fanø, Denmark
- Died: 24 June 1986 (aged 57)
- Occupation: Geologist
- Spouse: Svend Andersen
- Children: Peter (1956), Svend (1958)

Academic background
- Education: University of Copenhagen
- Thesis: Ammonites from the Upper Cretaceous of West Greenland (1965)

Academic work
- Discipline: Historical geology, Stratigraphy, Palaeontology
- Notable works: Research on belemnites, ammonites, and Cretaceous species

Tove Birkelund (28 November 1928 – 24 June 1986) was a Danish geologist who specialized in historical geology. She is remembered internationally for her research into the fossils of extinct squid-like species, including belemnites and ammonites, which she investigated in Denmark, Greenland and several other countries. She played a leading role in the Danish research community, serving as a member of the Danish Research Council for Natural Sciences and of the Carlsberg Foundation. From 1966 to 1986, Birkelund was professor of historical geography at Copenhagen University's Geological Institute.

== Early life, education and family ==
Born in Nordby on the island of Fanø on 28 November 1928, Tove Birkelund was the daughter of school principal Niels Birkelund (1890–1962) and his wife Ellen née Toftrup (1898–1980). After receiving her school leaving certificate in 1947 in Esbjerg, she studied geology at the University of Copenhagen, graduating in 1954. In April 1954, she married zoo director Svend Andersen (born 1923) with whom she had two children: Peter (1956) and Svend (1958).

== Career ==
Encouraged by her father, Birkelund took an interest in zoology and geology from an early age. While studying, she had focused on historical geology, stratigraphy and palaeontology, in an attempt to provide further understanding of the history of the Earth and the development of life. While a student, in 1949 and 1952 she joined Alfred Rosenkrantz on his expeditions to Nuussuaq in the west of Greenland. In 1957, she completed a ground-breaking study on Upper Cretaceous belemnites from Denmark after undertaking research on Bornholm, Møns Klint, Stevns Klint and in Jutland. The university awarded her a gold medal in 1958 for her report on Scaphites from western Greenland, a widespread species in the Cretaceous period in which she showed particular interest. She further developed her research in Greenland into a detailed doctoral thesis on Ammonites from the Upper Cretaceous of West Greenland in 1965, describing 31 species, of which 14 were new.

Birkelund continued working at Copenhagen University's Geological Institute and Museum, first as a research assistant (1954), then as an amanuensis (1960), department head (1963) and finally as a full professor in 1966, remaining until her retirement in 1986. She played a leading role in the Danish research community, serving as a member of the Danish Research Council for Natural Sciences and of the Carlsberg Foundation.

Tove Birkelund died in Gentofte on 24 June 1986.
