= Church Association for the Inner Mission in Denmark =

Danish conservative Lutheran Christian organization

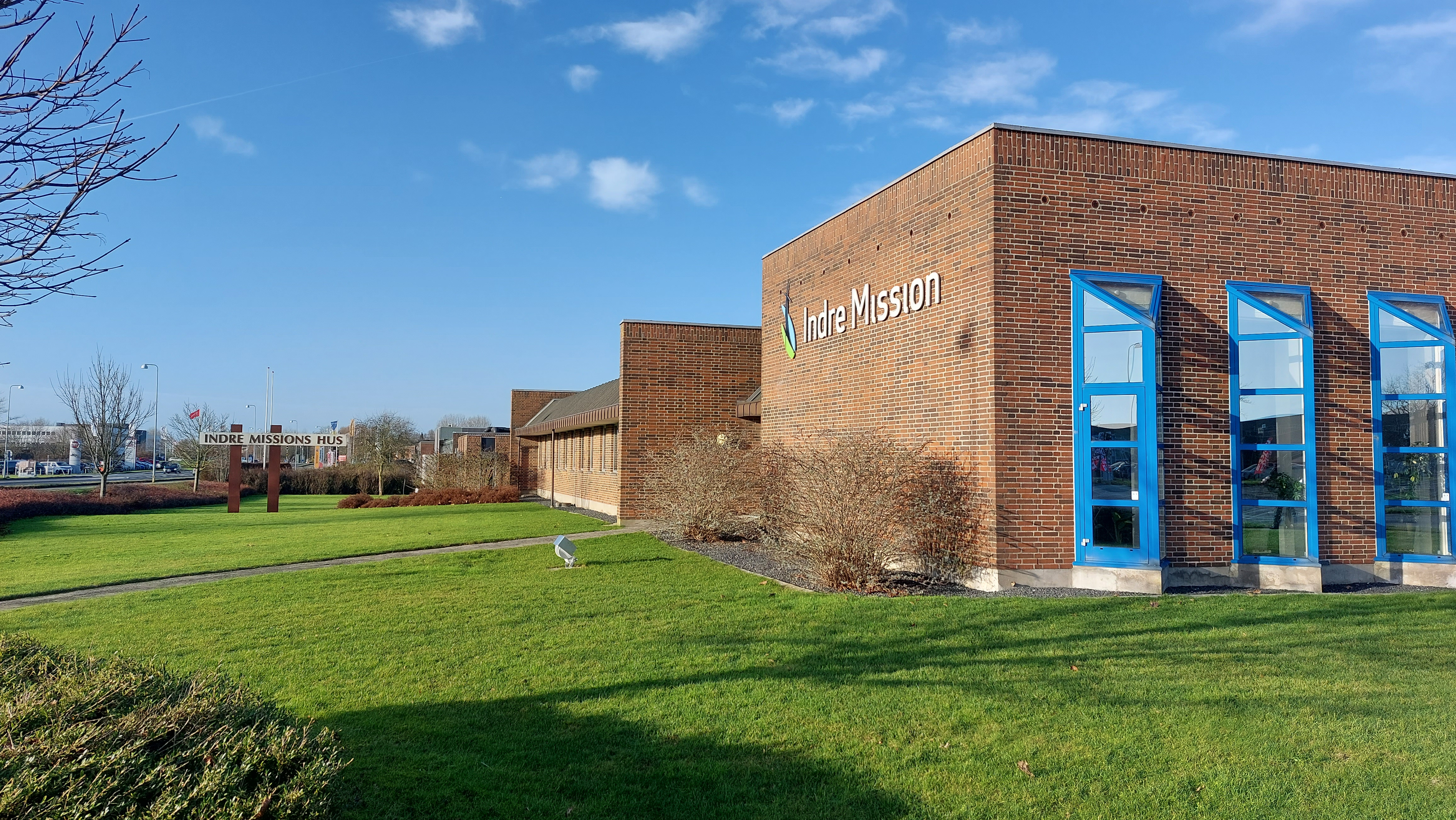
Indre Missions Hus, Fredericia

The Church Association for the Inner Mission in Denmark (Danish: Kirkelig Forening for den Indre Mission i Danmark), or in short form Inner Mission (Danish: Indre Mission) is a conservative Lutheran Christian organisation in Denmark. It is the largest revival movement within the Danish National Church. Despite its name, members of the Inner Mission are not separate from other congregations. Rather, the group, which is led by an independent board, is organised as a foundation supporting congregational activities.

== History ==
The movement was initially founded 13 September 1861 in the village of Stenlille on Zealand. The movement's origins derive from pietist and Lutheran orthodox traditions. The term Inner Mission implies a domestic mission targeted at those who are already Christians, as opposed to the many organisations dedicated to undertaking missions in foreign countries and among pagans.

The movement was influential in temperance work, various collective initiatives in rural communities, and other efforts to 'civilise' the people of the 19th century. Many poor people found in the movement a community where they could be on equal terms with more wealthy members of society, as it stressed Christian fellowship through a variety of group activities. As a movement within the National Church, the Inner Mission is believed to have halted the outflow of church members to charismatic free churches and sects. In Denmark, these never achieved the following they did in other countries, for example Sweden.

The founding family of the Lego company and many of its workers in the central Jutland village of Billund were adherents of the Inner Mission movement. In 1952 the company produced a glow-in-the-dark cross, one of its only known religious artifacts.

== Contemporary movement ==
A substantial number of adherents, but not all, can be described as Bible fundamentalists. The movement also stressed Lutheran teachings, and so was not ecumenical. In recent years, its doctrines have become less monolithic. Its traditional dogmas condemned drinking, dancing, card playing, swearing and working on a Sunday.

Traditionally, the Inner Mission's stronghold was rural western Jutland, but many communities elsewhere in Denmark, such as Haslev on Zealand and some towns, have been influenced by the movement. It is now a minor influence in most parishes where it is represented. Once there were about 1,000 so-called mission houses around Denmark, of which about 400 remain in use. These were (and are) meeting houses for Sunday school, prayer, spiritual and revivalist lectures, etc. Today, the headquarters of the movement is located in Fredericia.

== In fiction ==
The first part of Ken Follett's novel Hornet Flight is set in Nazi-occupied Denmark during World War II, where a West Jutland community is dominated by the Inner Mission. The protagonist - a rebellious young man - comes into head-on conflict with his father, a strict clergyman. Later in the book, this conflict is resolved when the protagonist gets involved in the anti-Nazi resistance and is supported by his father.

The Inner Mission plays heavily into the plot of Carl Theodor Dreyer's 1955 drama film Ordet, which features a plotline in which a man is forbidden from marrying the woman he loves unless his family converts to the Inner Mission.

It is also referenced in Herrens Veje/Ride Upon the Storm, a Danish TV series on a family of priests.
