= Hornet Flight =

Novel by Ken Follett

- First UK edition cover
- Author: Ken Follett
- Publisher: Macmillan Publishers (UK); E. P. Dutton (US)
- Publication date: December 2, 2002
- ISBN: 0-525-94689-6 (US edition)

Hornet Flight is a Second World War-based spy thriller written by British author Ken Follett. It was published in 2002 by Macmillan in the UK and Dutton in the US.

== Plot introduction ==
By late June 1941, the United Kingdom alone stood against Nazi Germany on the Western Front. In the East, the Soviet Army was feeling the full force of Operation Barbarossa. To show solidarity among the unlikely capitalist-communist Alliance, Winston Churchill and Bomber Command planned a massive aerial bombardment of German territories. Unfortunately and inexplicably, Bomber Command's planes were getting shot down in record numbers.

Meanwhile, 18-year-old Danish schoolboy Harald Olufsen grows increasingly dissatisfied with his country's cooperation with the German invaders. His resentment of the Wehrmacht leads him to discover the truth about a hidden military installation, a truth known to only a select few in the Nazi organization. Running from the German authorities and an old family enemy, Copenhagen police detective Peter Flemming, Harald knows that he must get to Britain. But to do so in time to save the bombers, Harald has one option: flight.

== Historical background to the novel ==
Hornet Flight is a fictionalized retelling of actual events. Follett's website states that his inspiration for the story came from Leo Marks, a former Special Operations Executive employee, who wrote a brief account in his book, Between Silk and Cyanide: A Codemaker's Story 1941-1945 about two young Danes who found a derelict de Havilland Hornet Moth biplane, repaired it, and flew it to Britain. While that event inspired the use of two teen-aged Danes as his primary characters, the story of the photographing of the German radar station and flying the film to Britain was actually that of Thomas Christian Sneum, a Flight Lieutenant in the Danish Naval Air Service, who made the flight to Britain on 21 June 1941 in a Hornet with Keld Peterson, the mechanic who helped him rebuild it. Sneum was arrested as a suspected double agent before being returned to Denmark as an agent, from which he escaped again in 1942 by crossing the ice to Sweden with a fellow naval aviator.

The German radar installations causing the havoc with the British bombers are historical. The Freya radar that Harald investigates was part of the Kammhuber Line, the German night air defense system along the North Sea. The Freya radar, with a range of 100 miles, was used to detect any incoming bombers at long-distance. Then 2 modified Würzburg Riese ("Würzburg Giant") radars tracked a single British bomber and a German night fighter to bring them together. The RAF tactically countered the line by concentrating all its bombers through a single radar sector in a "bomber stream", allowing the bulk to escape interception because the system could only concentrate on one bomber at a time.

However the actual events alluded to in Hornet Flight occurred a year later than in the novel, and without connection to the German invasion of the Soviet Union. The Himmelbett structure of radar installations did not become operational until late 1941. RAF bomber losses increased by 50% in the first months of 1942, but the trend was reversed with the first "thousand bomber raid" on Cologne on 30 May 1942. The concept of the bomber stream was not the result of espionage by Resistance operatives in any occupied country, but resulted from statistical analysis of British operations.

The strict Protestant community in which Harald Olufsen grew up and against which he rebels in the earlier part of the book is typical of those dominated by the religious movement known as "The Church Association for the Inner Mission in Denmark", of which West Jutland is a stronghold.

== Complex characters and loose-ends ==
Unlike formulaic action thrillers, the German characters in Hornet Flight are generally decent and honourable. Harald's nemesis, Danish Police Detective Peter Flemming, is a childhood acquaintance, formerly his older brother's best friend, he had turned into bitter enemy after an earlier falling out between the families. Flemming, though generally an obnoxious monster, does not lack psychological depth. An authoritarian personality leads him to regard policework as more than a job. For it becomes an obsession. In the conditions of 1941 Denmark, this fervor leads him to become a Nazi collaborator, indeed often showing more zeal than the German occupiers themselves.

The struggle which Harald and his friends wage, making enormous sacrifices, is morally ambiguous: they are, in essence, willing to lay their lives on the line so that the British will be able to bomb German cities. Only the vital need to bring down Hitler's monstrous and genocidal regime can justify their actions. Follett brings home the point by having the RAF set out to bomb Hamburg using the intelligence obtained by Harald and Karen. Hamburg was described as the home of Harald's beloved Jewish aunt and cousin. At the book's conclusion Harald is left with the gnawing doubt he may have caused their deaths - and, while not making him doubt the rightness of his actions, he is less than jubilant at the results.

Follett introduces a number of innocent Danish characters who would predictably be subject to persecution by the occupying Nazis: the brain-damaged wife of a Danish police detective, prominent Jews and their families, and homosexuals. However, Follett leaves the fates of these characters unresolved.

== Controversy ==
The publication of Hornet Flight generated some controversy when a Royal Air Force veteran residing in Zimbabwe wrote to Follett about a character mentioned only in the prologue, "Charles Ford" - a black RAF officer. The veteran claimed that there had been no black officers in the RAF, and accused Follett of including the character as a "sop" to black people. Ulric Cross, a black former RAF squadron leader and the man on whom the character of Charles Ford was based, refuted Frampton's claims in an article published in the Trinidad Express. Over 250 Trinidadians alone served in the RAF during World War II.

== List of characters ==
- Harald Olufsen - an 18-year-old minister's son, engineering student, who loves American jazz and hates Nazis
- Arne Olufsen - older brother of Harald; Danish Army Aviation pilot
- Karen Duchwitz - Jewish twin sister of Harald's schoolmate Tik, with whom Harald falls in love
- Hermia Mount - MI6 agent engaged to Arne Olufsen before the war
- Peter Flemming - Copenhagen detective; enemy of the Olufsens
- Tilde Jespersen - Police colleague of Flemming
- Digby Hoare - advisor to Winston Churchill, who loves Hermia
- Poul Kirke - Danish Army Aviation pilot and member of Hermia's spy network, the Nightwatchmen
- Walter Braun - German General liaison between the German Army and the Danish police.
