= Jacob Bymar =

Danish footballer (born 1982)

Personal information
- Full name: Jacob Dalsgaard Bymar
- Date of birth: 29 March 1982 (age 44)
- Place of birth: Nordby, Fanø, Denmark
- Height: 1.83 m (6 ft 0 in)
- Position: Forward

Team information
- Current team: Varde IF

Senior career*
Years	Team	Apps	(Gls)
2001–2002	Esbjerg fB	6	(0)
2005–2006	Fanø Boldklub		
2003–2004	KÍ Klaksvík		
–2008	B68 Toftir		
2008–2010	Varde IF		
2010–2011	Jerne IF		
2011–2014	Varde IF		

International career
1997–1998	Denmark U-16	4	(0)
1998–1999	Denmark U-17	9	(2)
1999–2000	Denmark U-19	9	(4)
- * Club domestic league appearances and goals

Jacob Dalsgaard Bymar (born 29 March 1982) is a Danish footballer currently playing for B68. He is a Danish former youth international.
