= Fanø =

Island and Municipality in Southern Denmark

- Island and Municipality
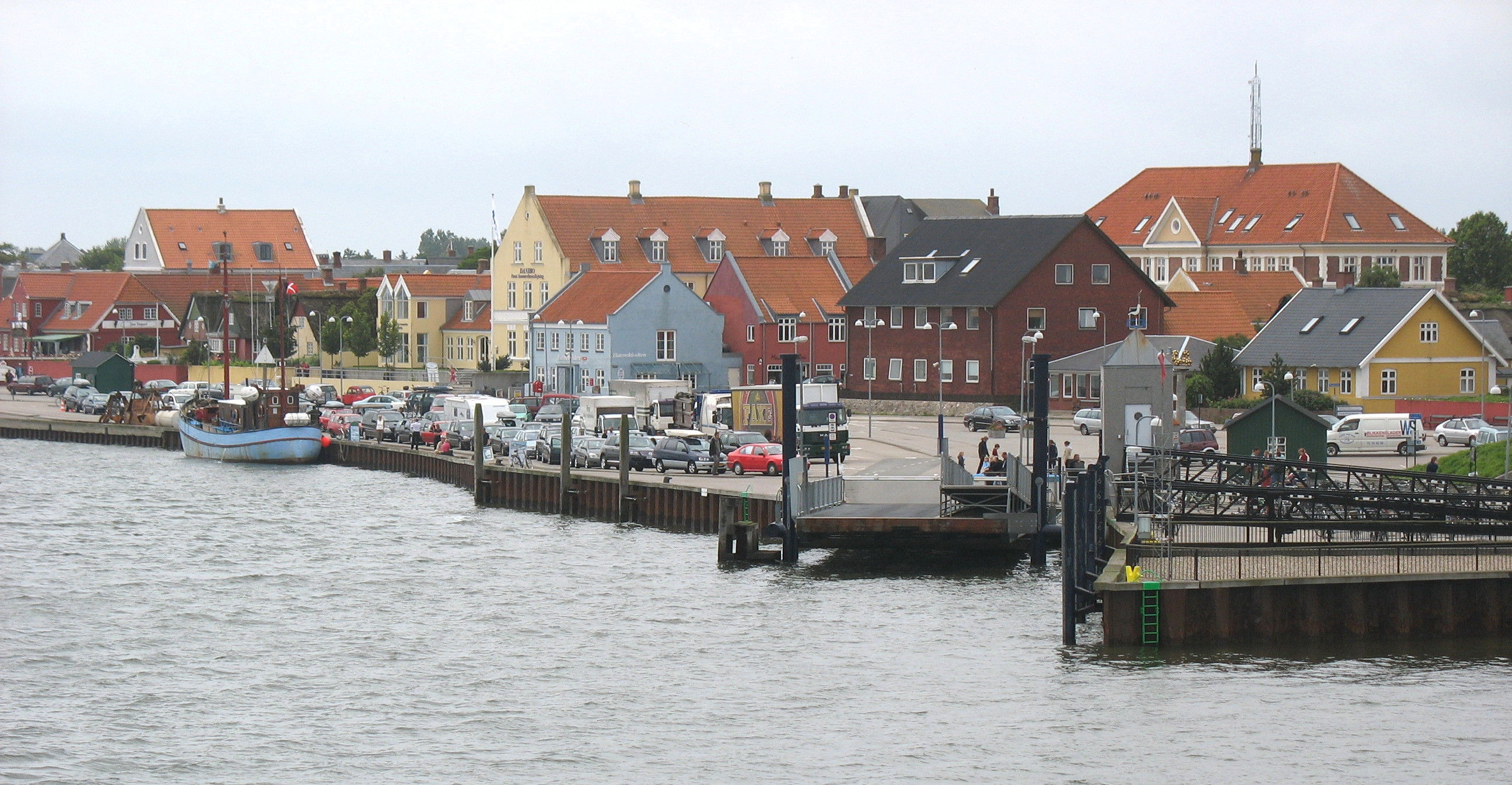

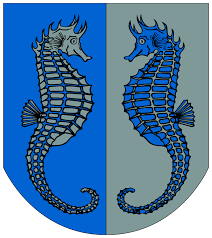
- Coat of arms

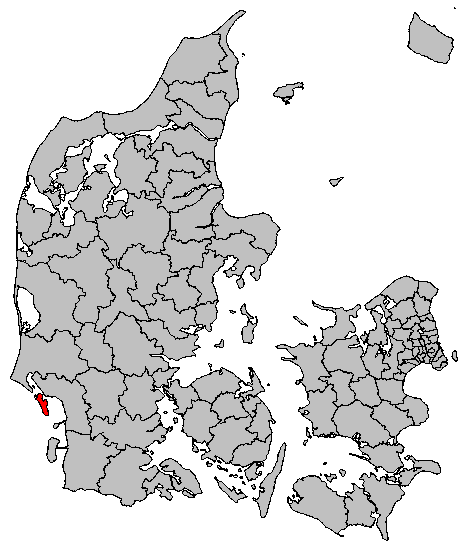
- Location in Denmark
- Coordinates: 55°24′51″N 8°24′37″E
- Country: Denmark
- Region: Southern Denmark

Government
  - Mayor: Frank Jensen

Area
  - Total: 56 km^{2} (22 sq mi)

Population (1 January 2026)
  - Total: 3,332
  - Density: 60/km^{2} (150/sq mi)
- Time zone: UTC+1 (CET)
  - Summer (DST): UTC+2 (CEST)
- Website: www.fanoe.dk

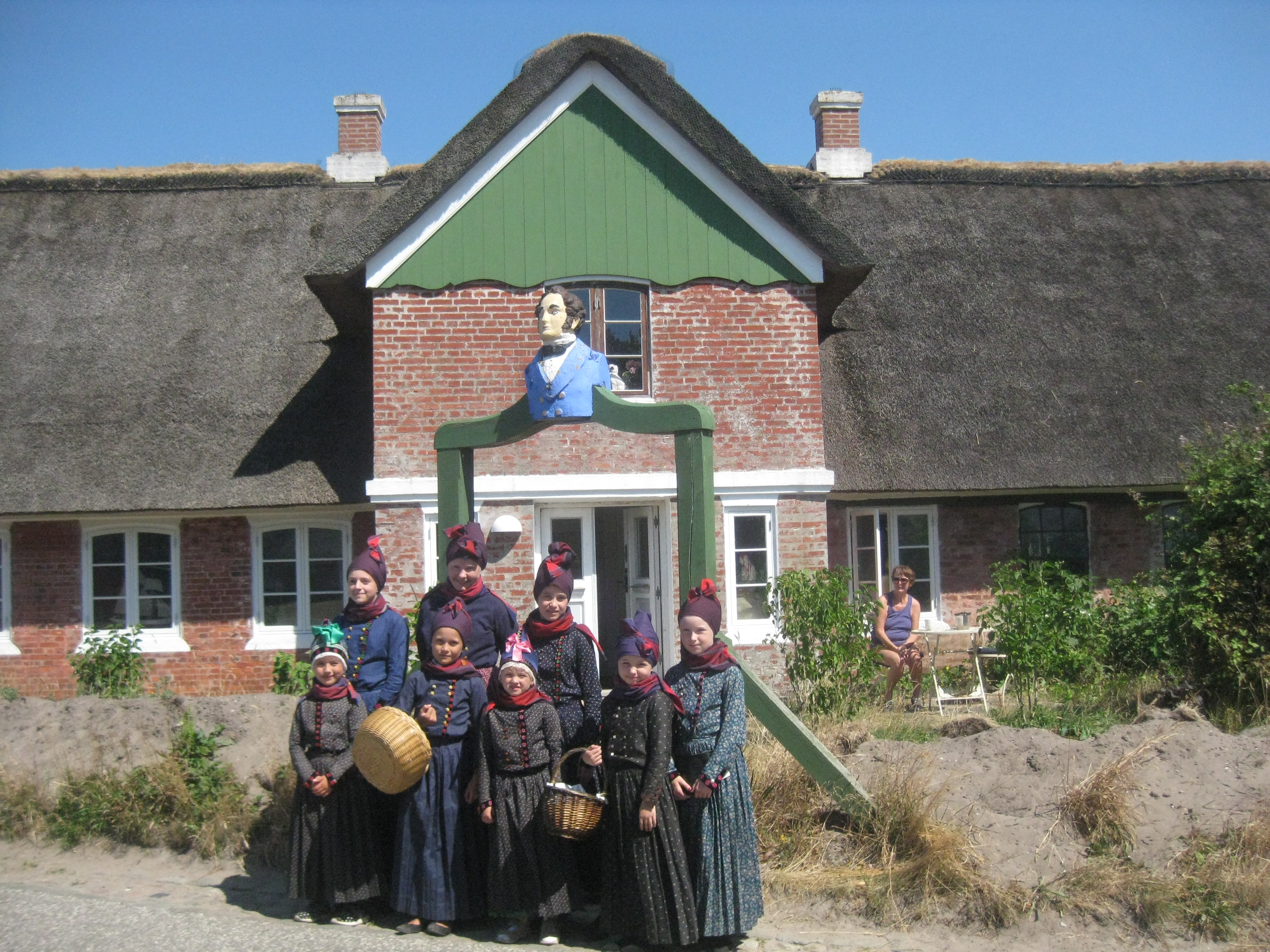
Girls wearing folk costumes.

Fanø (pronunciation [ˈfɛːˌnøˀ]) is a Danish island in the North Sea off the coast of southwestern Denmark, and is the very northernmost of the Danish Wadden Sea Islands. Fanø Municipality (Fanø Kommune) is the kommune that covers the island and its seat is the town of Nordby.

== Island ==
Fanø is separated from the mainland by the Wadden Sea over a span of approximately five kilometres (3.1 miles)., in the north at the closest point to the mainland 1.24 km. The island is 16 kilometres (9.9 miles) long and 3 kilometres (1.9 miles) wide, and it is located off the coast from the city of Esbjerg to which it is connected by ferry. The ferry ride takes 12 minutes.

A variety of environments are to be found on Fanø. Not surprisingly, a very common one is sand. The island's whole western shore is one long beach. The island's northwestern corner is a vast sandbank called "Søren Jessens Sand". Søren Jessen was an entrepreneur and captain from Hjerting, today the westernmost suburb of Esbjerg and the bank is named after him because his ship, the "Anne Catriane", stranded here in 1712.

The vegetation on Fanø is mainly heath and small pine trees, never growing tall because of the predominant strong westerly winds from the North Sea.

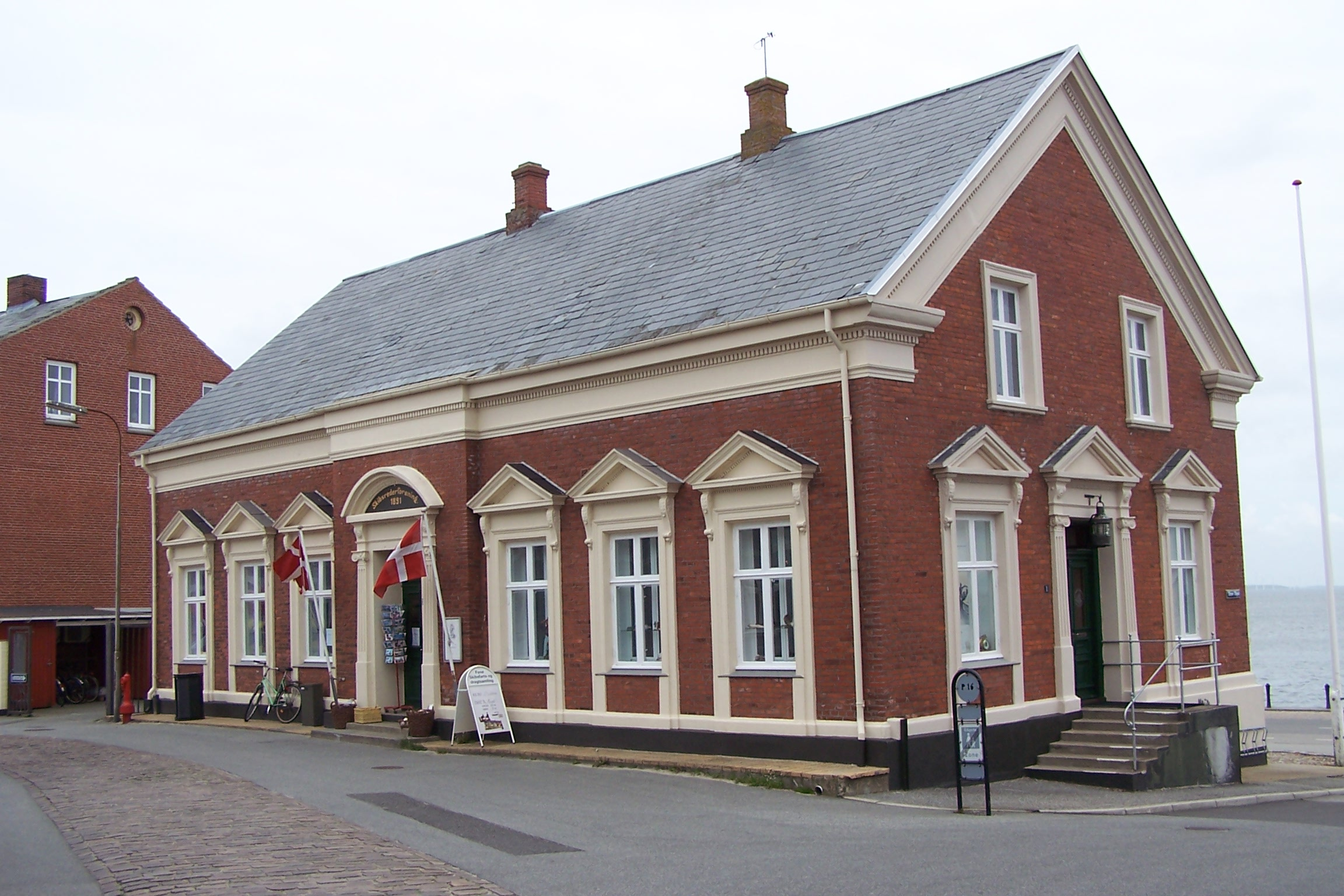
Museum of shipping, Nordby

Fanø relies heavily on tourism and is visited by some 30,000 people each summer. The main attraction is the fine white sand beach, which is also a popular playground for all kinds of wind and water sports, such as kite flying, surfing and buggies.

Long before paved roads, the beach - being long, straight and quite firm - hosted a yearly motorcycle and car racing event from 1919 and until 1923, where a tragic accident killed a local boy and put a stop to further events. Today is possible to drive your own car on the beach all the way from Sønderho to Fanø Vesterhavsbad. A public bus service is also operated on the beach. 1 January 2018 the municipality took over the responsibilities of public mass transit on the island from the Region of Southern Denmark.

The Wadden Sea has seals and migrating birds, and the two sailor towns Nordby and Sønderho have a maritime history. The towns were once among the most wealthy and influential in Denmark, and their vernacular architecture consists of thatched-roof houses all oriented west–east because of the westerly winds.

During World War II, Fanø was part of the Atlantic Wall and the remains of the 300 bunkers built by the Nazis can still be spotted along the coast line.

A number of animals that are otherwise common in Denmark, such as vipers, squirrels, moles and badgers, are nonexistent on the island, whereas foxes, hedgehogs, roebucks, hares and especially rabbits exist in abundance.

Fanø is known as a place of summer vacation homes for the well-to-do, and has maintained its population number in contrast to other small islands in Denmark.

== Politics ==
Fanø's municipal council consists of 11 members, elected every four years.

=== Municipal council ===
Below are the municipal councils elected since the Municipal Reform of 2007.

Election	Party										Total seats	Turnout	Elected mayor
Election	A	B	C	F	G	L	M	V	Ø	Å	Total seats	Turnout	Elected mayor
2005	1		3		1	1	3	2			11	81.3%	Erik Nørreby (V)
2009	2		2	1			1	5			11	81.1%	Erik Nørreby (V)
2013	1		2	1		1	2	4			11	85.4%	Erik Nørreby (V)
2017	1		2	1		2	1	3		1	11	85.7%	Sofie Valbjørn (Å)
2021	1	4	3					2	1		11	82.4%	Frank Jensen (B)
Data from Kmdvalg.dk 2005, 2009, 2013, 2017 and 2021

== Notable people ==
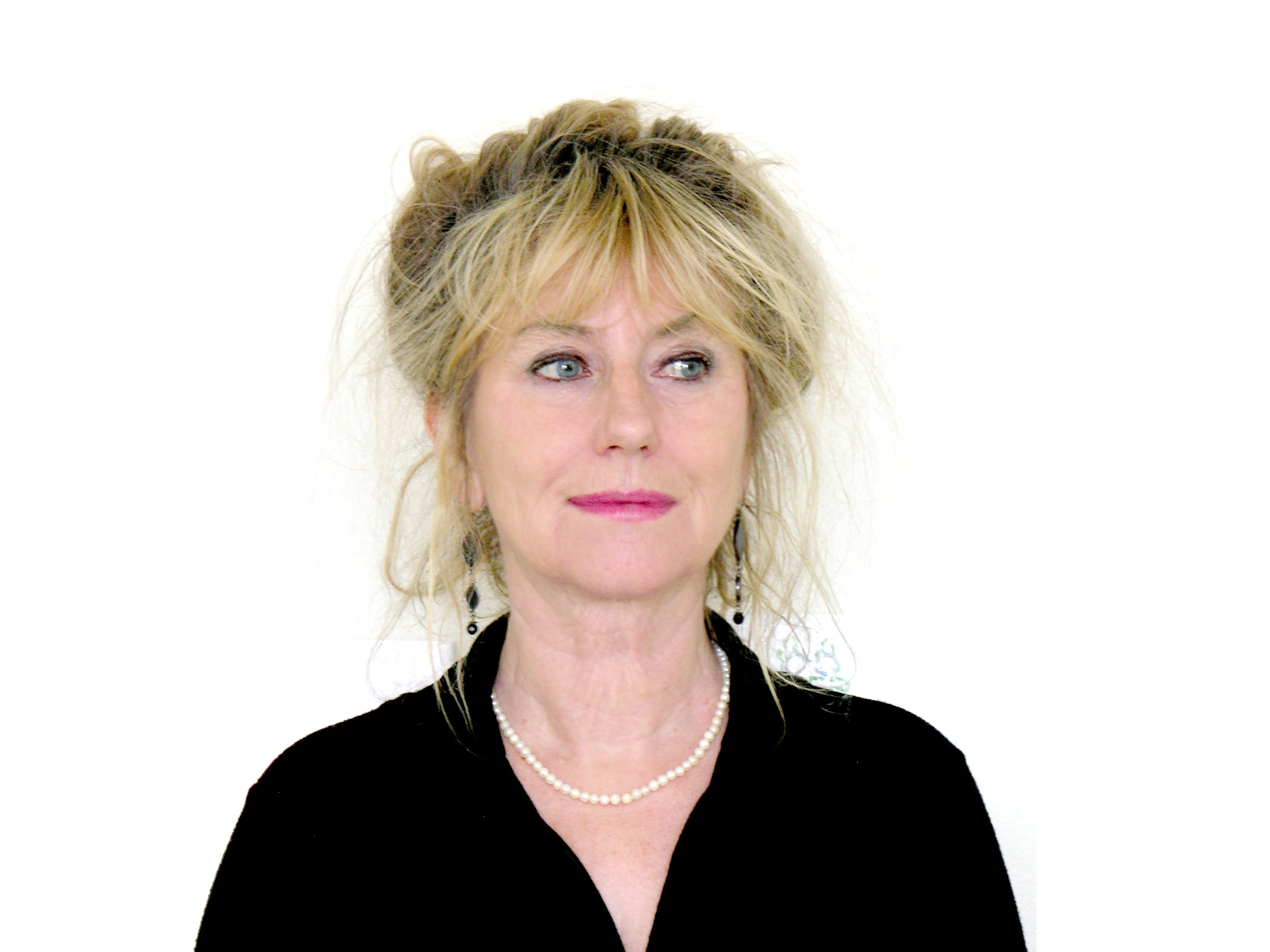
Lilian Brøgger

- Henriette Nielsen (1815–1900), Danish author and playwright. She used local costumes from Fanø.
- Ann Forrest (1895–1985), Danish-born American actress. Born in Sønderho.
- Lilian Brøgger (born 1950), Danish illustrator. The first student to graduate as an illustrator from the Danish Design School in 1972. Born in Nordby.
- Thomas Sneum (1917–2007), Naval pilot who helped deliver vital photographs of a Nazi radar installation on Fanø to British authorities by using a fragile and risky biplane. Born in Sønderho.
- Tove Birkelund (1928–1986), historical geologist
- Eva Louise Buus (born 1979), Danish artist. In 2015, she exhibited works in Fanø Museum.
- Jacob Bymar (born 1982), Danish footballer currently playing for B68. Born in Nordby.

== Municipality ==
The municipality is in Region of Southern Denmark, and covers an area of 56 square kilometres (22 square miles). It has a total population of 3,426 (1. January 2023). Its mayor is Sofie Valbjørn. She is a member of The Alternative political party.

The main town and the site of its municipal council is the town of Nordby. Other towns include Sønderho, Fanø Vesterhavsbad and Rindby.

Fanø Municipality was not merged with any adjacent municipality under the municipal reform of 2007, as it agreed to enter into a "municipal cooperation agreement" with Esbjerg Municipality.
