= Sønderho =

Village in southwestern Denmark

- Village
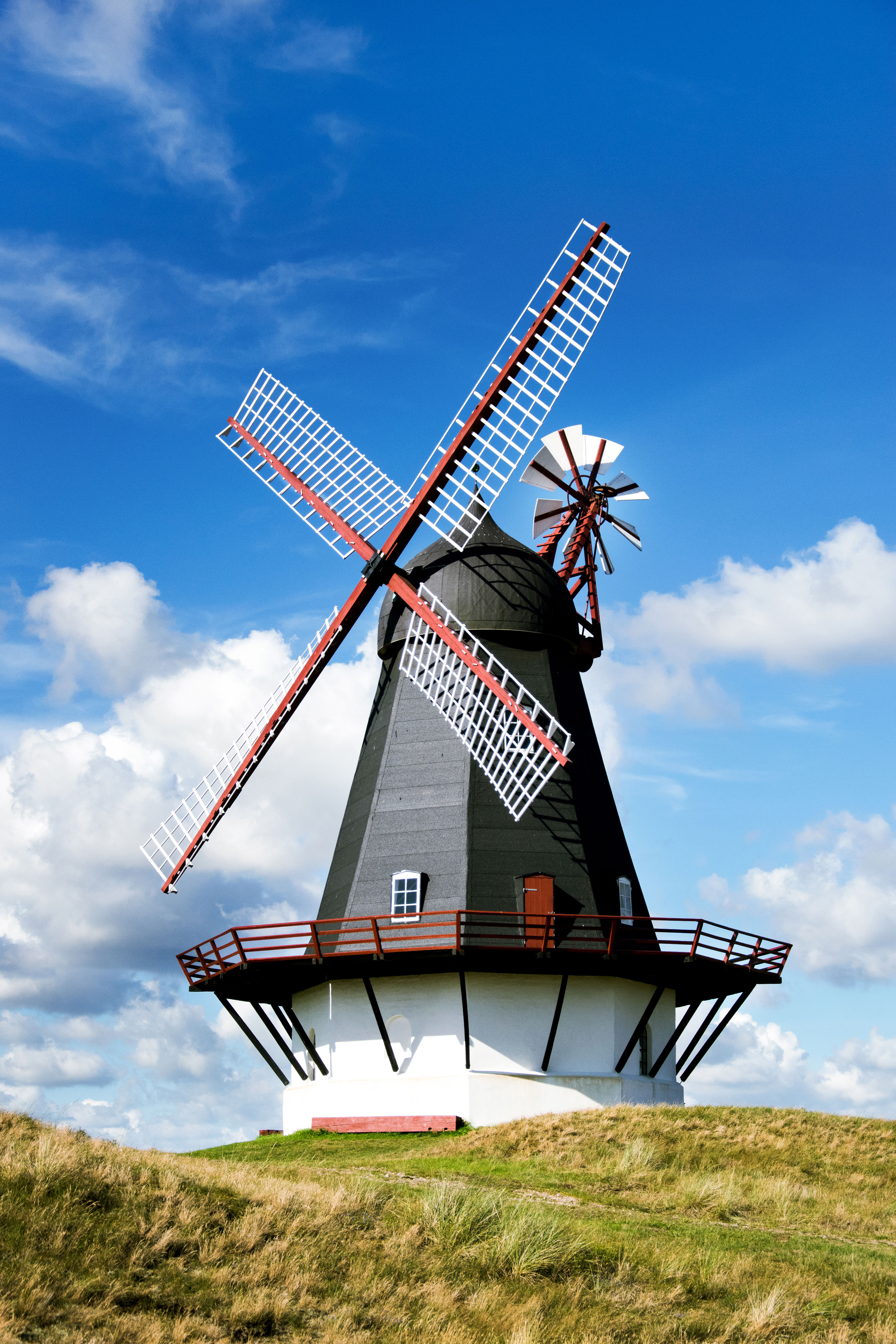
- Sønderho Windmill

- Location in Region of Southern Denmark Sønderho (Denmark)
- Coordinates: 55°21′2″N 8°28′4″E
- Country: Denmark
- Region: Southern Denmark
- Municipality: Fanø Municipality

Population (2026)
  - Total: 269

Sønderho is a small village, with a population of 269 (1 January 2026), at the southern tip of the island Fanø, in southwestern Denmark.

The village dates back to the 16th century and has about 300 well-preserved buildings that stem mainly from the 19th century when Sønderho was the leading navigation area on the Jutlandic west coast. Almost all the cottages, stand with their petite thatched house ends to the east and west surrounded by small gardens. Between the houses is a labyrinthine network of narrow paths and crooked streets. This is quite different from a hundred years ago, when there were only a few weather-beaten trees. The village is well protected from wind and water behind large sand dunes and green dikes. It has throughout history been connected to sea travel, but today the attractions are primarily the beaches (including the naturist) and the area's nature. There are shops, artisans, art galleries, cafés and restaurants and of course Sønderho Kro, one of the oldest guesthouses in Denmark, from 1722. Nearby in Nordby there was an artist colony from same time as Skagen. This is reflected most clearly at the Fanø Art Museum, which is located in the village.

The main street of the village is Landevejen. It has been renovated with cobblestone gutters finished with grass and cobblestones leading up to the cottage fences. These practical, traffic-calming measures are an attempt to reduce wheeled traffic in the village, so visitors and holidaymakers can enjoy the village on foot. To finish the urban embellishment the local authorities have granted new traditional street lights and signposts to make everything appear beautiful and harmonious.

Modern houses and buildings retain much the local character of the traditional Fanø cottages but more and more are being used as summer residences which makes it difficult to maintain the number of inhabitants in a way that the village will stay a living community. Due to modern technology, it is possible to settle in Sønderho and still have a working life that reaches beyond the island. The latest initiative in order to preserve a living community is the daycare center, Bakskuld. The old Sonderho Harbour and the navigational mark Kaaver will soon be added to Sonderho, see www.sonderhohavn.dk.

Tourism is still the main basis for the existence of the village and because of that, its shops, restaurants, bank and library are able to stay open all year. The village has a lifeboat station, a volunteer fire brigade, a central antenne system with cable TV, and Internet and even its own vicar who resides in the vicarage.

== Sources ==
=== Online ===
"Sønderho". Denmark: Sønderho Citizen's Association. 2009.

"Sønderho Kro". Denmark: sonderhokro.dk. 2009.

"Fanø Kunstmuseum". Denmark: Fanø Kunstmuseum. 2009.
