= Nordby, Fanø =

Nordby
- Town
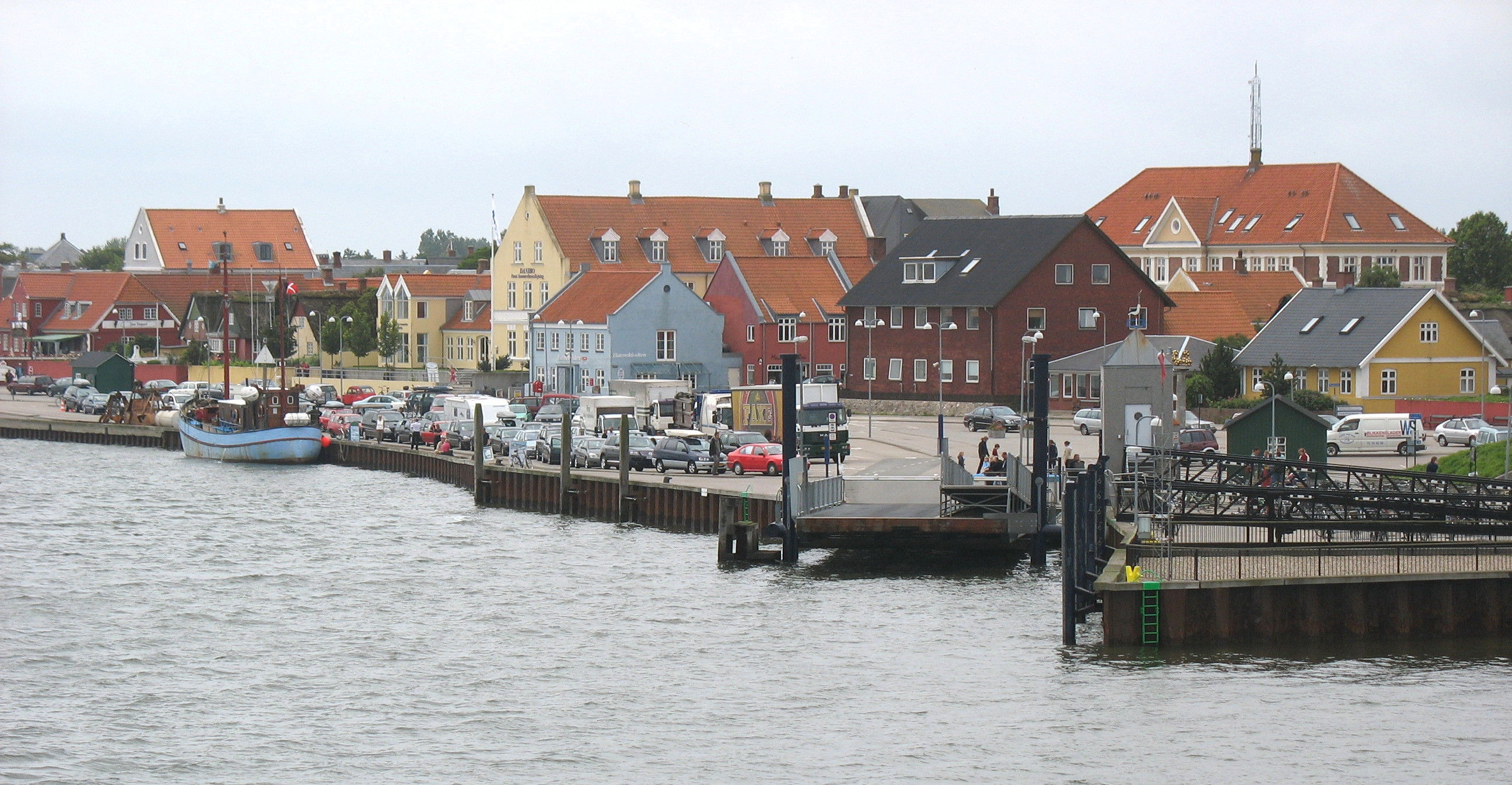
- Nordby Waterfront

- Location in Denmark Nordby (Region of Southern Denmark)
- Coordinates: 55°26′0″N 8°24′0″E
- Country: Denmark
- Region: Southern Denmark (Syddanmark)
- Municipality: Fanø

Government
  - Mayor: Frank Jensen

Area
  - Urban: 1.5 km^{2} (0.58 sq mi)

Population (2026)
  - Urban: 2,684
  - Urban density: 1,800/km^{2} (4,600/sq mi)
- Time zone: UTC+1 (CET)
  - Summer (DST): UTC+2 (CEST)
- Postal code: 6720 Fanø

Nordby is a Danish town, seat of the Fanø Municipality, in the Region of Southern Denmark. The population was 2,684 as of 1 January 2026.

== Geography ==
Nordby is on the island of Fanø (part of the Danish Wadden Sea Islands), by the North Sea and not far from the city of Esbjerg.

It is by far the largest town on Fanø. Nordby also has the only ferry from Fanø to the Danish mainland, with a 12-minute ferry to nearby Esbjerg. Many inhabitants in Nordby therefore work in Esbjerg and use the frequent ferry to get to and from work.

== Religion ==
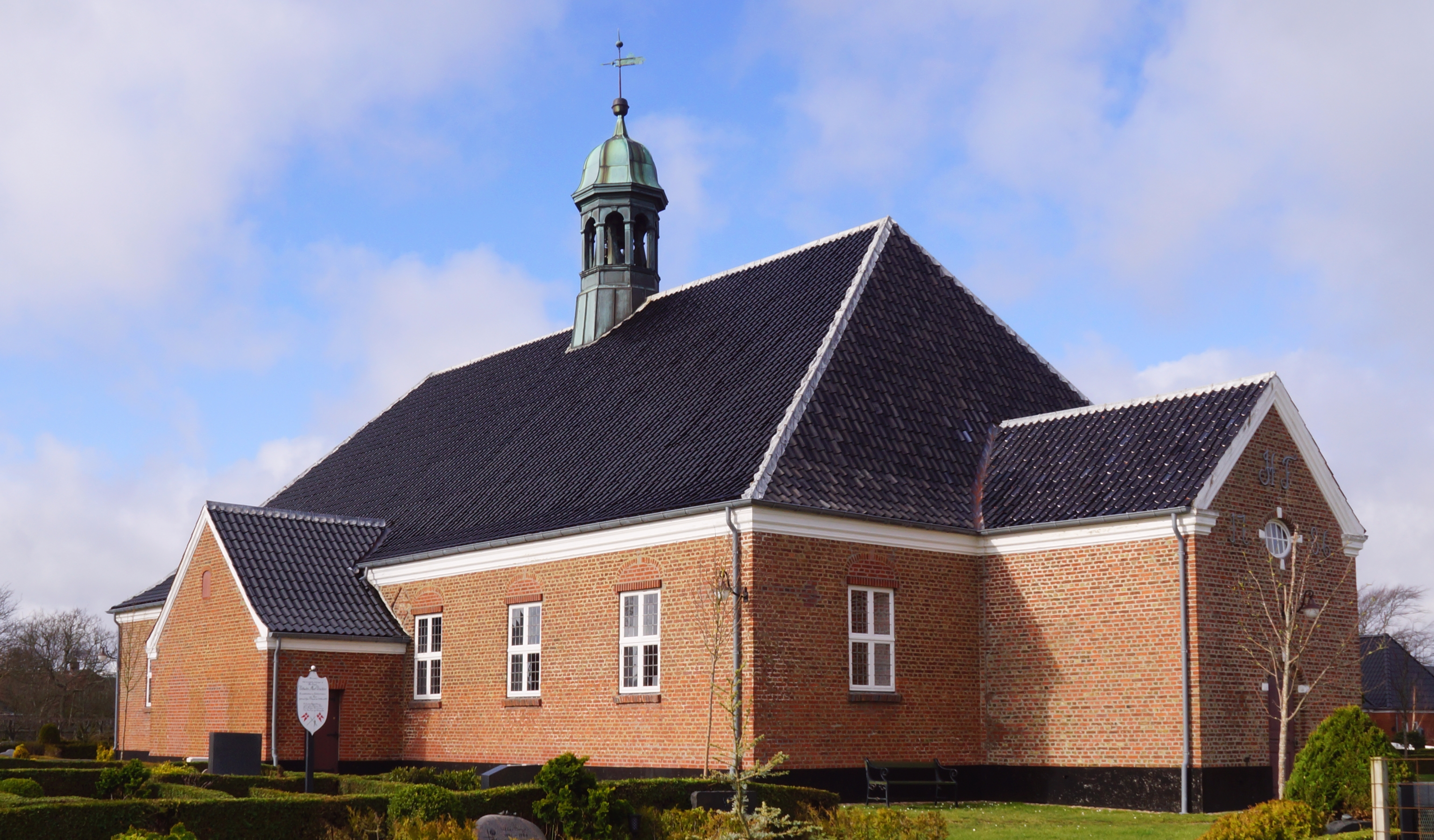
Nordby church (2020)

Nordby Church was built in 1786 and has historically been the church for the people of the sea from Fanø and a protestant church. Typical of churches on islands in the North Sea, including both churches on Fanø, Nordby Church does not have a large tower. Inside the church, numerous ship models hang to represent the island's maritime history.
