= Harry Turtledove bibliography =

Bibliography of science fiction, fantasy, historical fiction and nonfiction writer Harry Turtledove:

== Writing as Eric Iverson ==
=== Elabon ===
Set in a Bronze Age fantasy world, these stories follow Gerin the Fox as he tries to maintain order in the Northlands.

- Wereblood (1979)
- Werenight (1979, revised in 1994 to include Wereblood)
- Prince of the North (1994, as by Harry Turtledove)
- King of the North (1996, as by Harry Turtledove)
- Fox and Empire (1998, as by Harry Turtledove)
  - Wisdom of the Fox (1999, collects the revised Werenight and Prince of the North; as by Harry Turtledove)
  - Tale of the Fox (2000, collects King of the North and Fox and Empire; as by Harry Turtledove)

== Writing as H. N. Turteltaub ==
- Justinian (1998)

=== Hellenic Traders ===
This historical fiction series is about two cousins who are traveling merchants in the 4th-century BC Mediterranean.

- Over the Wine Dark Sea (2001)
- The Gryphon's Skull (2002)
- The Sacred Land (2003)
- Owls to Athens (2004)
- Salamis (2020)

== Writing as Harry Turtledove ==
=== Videssos ===
The series is set in a world analogous to the real-life Byzantine Empire.

- The Videssos cycle: One of Julius Caesar's legions is transported to a world that resembles the then-future Byzantine Empire but with magic.
  - The Misplaced Legion (1987)
  - An Emperor for the Legion (1987)
  - The Legion of Videssos (1987)
  - Swords of the Legion (1987)
- The Tale of Krispos series
  - Krispos Rising (1991)
  - Krispos of Videssos (1991)
  - Krispos the Emperor (1994)
- The Time of Troubles series
  - The Stolen Throne (1995)
  - Hammer and Anvil (1996)
  - The Thousand Cities (1997)
  - Videssos Besieged (1998)
- The Bridge of the Separator (2005)

=== Worldwar / Colonization ===
The series incorporates elements of both science fiction and alternate history. In Worldwar, aliens invade during World War II in 1942. The Colonization trilogy deals with the course of history a generation after the initial series, as the humans and aliens work to share Earth. Homeward Bound follows a human spaceship that brings a delegation to the alien homeworld.

- Worldwar tetralogy
  - In the Balance (1994)
  - Tilting the Balance (1995)
  - Upsetting the Balance (1996)
  - Striking the Balance (1996)
- Colonization trilogy
  - Second Contact (1999)
  - Down to Earth (2000)
  - Aftershocks (2001)
- Homeward Bound (2004)

=== Southern Victory ===
Order 191 is never found by Union troops during the Maryland Campaign and so the Battle of Antietam never occurs. Instead, the Army of Northern Virginia, under Robert E. Lee, marches into Pennsylvania, crushes George B. McClellan's Army of the Potomac at Camp Hill, and proceeds to capture the city of Philadelphia. As a result, the Confederacy wins the War of Secession in 1862 with official recognition as an independent nation from Britain and France. Another popular moniker for the series is Timeline-191.

- How Few Remain (1997)
- The Great War trilogy
  - American Front (1998)
  - Walk in Hell (1999)
  - Breakthroughs (2000)
- The American Empire trilogy
  - Blood and Iron (2001)
  - The Center Cannot Hold (2002)
  - The Victorious Opposition (2003)
- The Settling Accounts tetralogy
  - Return Engagement (2004)
  - Drive to the East (2005)
  - The Grapple (2006)
  - In at the Death (2007)

=== Darkness / Derlavai / World at War ===
The fantasy series is about a global war that occurs in a world related to medieval Europe in which magic exists. Many plot elements are analogous to elements of World War II, with kingdoms and sorceries that are comparable to the historical nations and technologies.

- Into the Darkness (1999)
- Darkness Descending (2000)
- Through the Darkness (2001)
- Rulers of the Darkness (2002)
- Jaws of Darkness (2003)
- Out of the Darkness (2004)

=== War Between the Provinces ===
The fantasy series is based heavily on the American Civil War except that magic exists, the geography of the North and South have been reversed, and blond-haired serfs are featured rather than black slaves.

- Sentry Peak (2000)
- Marching Through Peachtree (2001)
- Advance and Retreat (2002)

=== Crosstime Traffic ===
Travel between parallel timelines, for the purpose of harvesting resources, has become possible in the late 21st century. It is a young adult fiction series and so racial slurs, profanity, and sex are considerably muted, compared to Turtledove's other work.

- Gunpowder Empire (2003) - the Roman Empire won an analog of the Battle of the Teutoburg Forest and still goes strong, but technology never advanced beyond the discovery of gunpowder.
- Curious Notions (2004) - the German Empire won a Blitzkrieg version of World War I in 1914.
- In High Places (2006) - the effects of the 14th century's bubonic plagues were doubled, so that the world never left the Middle Ages.
- The Disunited States of America (2006) - the United States did not form a federal government in 1787, and North America balkanized into several dozen nation-states who have periodic border wars.
- The Gladiator (2007) - the Soviet Union won the Cold War, and Italy became an inefficient impoverished communist nation.
- The Valley-Westside War (2008) - civilization remains at a quasi-medieval level since the nuclear world war of 1967.

The Gladiator won the 2008 Prometheus Award.

=== Days of Infamy ===
The Japanese Empire gains the initiative in the Pacific War by invading and occupying Hawaii immediately following the attack on Pearl Harbor.

- Days of Infamy (2004)
- End of the Beginning (2005)

=== Atlantis ===
The trilogy describes a world in which the American East Coast, from the tip of Florida to Nova Scotia, broke away from the mainland around 85 million years ago and has an island biota that is similar to New Zealand's. It was discovered in 1452 by a Breton fisherman, François Kersauzon, and was named Atlantis. The seventh continent becomes a focal point in a gradually diverging timeline. Two short stories, "Audubon in Atlantis" and "The Scarlet Band," have been set in the milieu.

- Opening Atlantis (2007)
- The United States of Atlantis (2008)
- Liberating Atlantis (2009)
- Atlantis and Other Places (2010) contains "Audubon in Atlantis" and "The Scarlet Band" (a Sherlock Holmes pastiche of A Study in Scarlet and "The Adventure of the Speckled Band" in which the Dr. Watson analog repeatedly voices racial concepts common to that time) among ten other unrelated stories.

Opening Atlantis was a finalist for the 2009 Prometheus Award. The United States of Atlantis and Liberating Atlantis were finalists for the 2010 Prometheus Award.

=== Opening of the World ===
The trilogy describes a fantasy world in which inhabitants of an empire that is of the Iron Age but has Pleistocene wildlife explore a land uncovered by a receding glacier and then discover a threat to their national security.

- Beyond the Gap (2007)
- Breath of God (2008)
- The Golden Shrine (2009)

=== The War That Came Early ===
A hexalogy describing an alternate World War II which begins in 1938 over Czechoslovakia. The first volume, Hitler's War, was released in hardcover in 2009 without a series title.

- Hitler's War (2009); published in paperback as The War That Came Early: Hitler's War (2010).
- West and East (2010)
- The Big Switch (2011)
- Coup d'Etat (2012)
- Two Fronts (2013)
- Last Orders (2014)

=== Supervolcano ===
The trilogy has the Yellowstone Caldera erupt at some unspecified point in the future and covers the decade following the Eruption.

- Supervolcano: Eruption (2011)
- Supervolcano: All Fall Down (2012)
- Supervolcano: Things Fall Apart (2013)

=== The Hot War ===
Point of divergence: 1950. The Korean War escalates into World War III after Harry Truman allows Douglas MacArthur to use atomic bombs as the latter had wanted to, leading to a chain reaction of nuclear bomb attacks throughout Asia, Europe, and North America.

- Bombs Away (2015)
- Fallout (2016)
- Armistice (2017)

=== State of Jefferson Stories ===
First published in May 2016, the stories are set in a world in which Sasquatch, Yeti, Indonesian Hobbits, merfolk, and other cryptids are real or not extinct. Unlike common popular depictions of such creatures as less evolved primates, they are integrated into a world designed for ordinary humans ("little people"). Like other ethnic minorities cryptids experience cultural assimilation and racial stereotyping, become less familiar with ancestral customs and languages, and interbreed with the majority.

In 1919 several counties in northern California and southern Oregon secede, forming the State of Jefferson. Neither the new state nor the earlier discovery of cryptids greatly affects United States or world history, with events such as the Chinese invasion of Tibet, 1973 oil crisis, and Iranian hostage crisis still occurring. Most American Sasquatch live in the state; although they are still a small minority, size is a protected class in Jefferson, with anti-discrimination law guaranteeing reasonable accommodation.

Most stories depict Governor Bill Williamson, Jefferson's second Sasquatch leader, who during the late 1970s and early 1980s meets Charles Kuralt, Jerry Turner, Nobuo Fujita and a Yeti Dalai Lama. From the state capital of Yreka he promotes his small, rural, and obscure state to the nation and world as an example of how different species can peacefully cooperate.

- "Visitor from the East" (May 2016)
- "Peace is Better" (May 2016)
- "Typecasting" (June 2016; set at the 1980 Ashland Shakespeare Festival)
- "Three Men and a Sasquatch" (January 2019)
- "Something Fishy" (January 2020)
- "Always Something New" (January 2020; set the day of the 1980 United States presidential election)
- "Tie a yellow ribbon" (January 2020; set after the Iranian hostage crisis)

=== Standalone books ===
- Agent of Byzantium (1987): Imperial Byzantine special agent Basil Argyros is sent on various missions in a world in which Muhammad became a Christian saint and so Islam never existed and the Byzantine Empire never declined—and also its arch-enemy, the Persian Sasanian Empire, surviving intact into the 13th century and beyond.
- A Different Flesh (1988): A related set of short stories spanning the 17th to 20th centuries set in a universe in which, along with the prehistoric megafauna, the Native Americans are Homo erectus, who are known as "sims" to the colonists of English descent. Suggested by Turtledove's reading of Stephen Jay Gould, the novel's main theme is what effect the proximity of a closely related but significantly different species would have on how humans view themselves, one another, and the great chain of life.
- Noninterference (1988): A human interstellar survey team violates a directive to avoid interference with alien civilizations, with disastrous long-term consequences. Republished in the collection 3xT.
- Kaleidoscope (1990): A short-story collection, including "The Road Not Taken". Re-published in the collection 3xT.
- A World of Difference (1990): In this alternative history story, the fourth planet of the Solar System is larger, and named Minerva instead of Mars. The Viking space probe of the 1970s sends back one picture—that of an alien creature swinging a stick—before losing contact. A U.S. mission and a Soviet mission are sent to explore the planet; both missions back rival primitive groups in a tribal war.
- Earthgrip (1991): A woman whose desire is to teach a university course in Middle English Science Fiction joins a trader ship's crew, just to get something different on her curriculum vitae. Re-published in the collection 3xT.
- The Guns of the South (1992): A science fiction/alternate history in which the Confederate army is supplied with AK-47s by time traveling members of the Afrikaner Weerstandsbeweging from the year 2014 and win the Civil War in 1864.
- The Case of the Toxic Spell Dump (1993): EPA agent David Fisher battles displaced magical powers in a very creative sorcerous equivalent to late-20th century Los Angeles. He follows the evidence to a toxic spell dump, where dangerous remnants of industrial sorcery are stored.
- Departures (1993): A short story collection
- Down in the Bottomlands (1993, reprinted in 2015 in We Install and Other Stories): At the end of the Miocene period, the Mediterranean Sea stays dry to the present day. The dry sea basin is a large canyon containing a national park, and a strongbrow who works as a park ranger must race to stop terrorists from letting in the Atlantic and flooding the area.
- The Two Georges (1995) alternate history/mystery, co-authored with Richard Dreyfuss: Set in 1995 in a world in which the American Revolution was peacefully avoided. The painting that symbolizes the union between North America and the United Kingdom is stolen by the terrorist group known as the Sons of Liberty, who want independence from the British Empire. Officers of the Royal American Mounted Police must find it before it is destroyed.
- Thessalonica (1997): Early Christians in the Greek city of Thessalonica deal with barbarian invaders on both physical and metaphysical levels (the book was inspired by the Medieval Miracles of Saint Demetrius).
- Between the Rivers (1998): Taking place in a fantasy realm equivalent to ancient Mesopotamia, city-states ruled by different gods fight for dominance.
- Justinian (1998): Fictionalized account (with some speculation involved) of the life of the Byzantine Emperor Justinian II—using the H. N. Turteltaub pseudonym.
- Household Gods (1999); co-written with Judith Tarr; science fiction/alternate history: A modern California lawyer finds herself in the Roman Empire of Marcus Aurelius.
- Counting Up, Counting Down (2002): A short story collection.
- The Daimon (2002): A novella included in the alternate history collections Worlds That Weren't and Atlantis and Other Places. It describes a world in which the philosopher Socrates aids the Athenian general Alcibiades in defeating the Sicilians and Spartans, allowing him to unite the city-states of ancient Greece and to contemplate war on the Persian Empire about 80 or 90 years before it happened in our history.
- Ruled Britannia (2002) alternate history: The Spanish Armada conquers England and forces Shakespeare to write a play about Philip II. At the same time, he is secretly writing a play for the English underground resistance about Boudica's rebellion, with Boudica meant to be analogous to the imprisoned Elizabeth I.
- In the Presence of Mine Enemies (2003) alternate history: Follows the struggles of a family of secret Jews in Berlin, nearly 70 years after a Nazi victory in World War II. The events in the story follow a common theme of Turtledove's work by transplanting one set of historical events into another setting (the most prominent example being Southern Victory Series moving European history onto the American continent). In this case, the decline of the Soviet Union in the 1990s is translated to the Third Reich in the 21st century, and the secret Jews' way of life is reminiscent of that of Marranos in Spain.
- Conan of Venarium (2003): An authorized prequel to Robert E. Howard's tales of Conan the Barbarian depicts a 14-year-old Conan's resistance to the imperialist legions who occupy his village.
- Every Inch a King (ISFiC Press) (2005): An acrobat becomes king of a small country. Although set in a fantasy world, it is analogous to the real-world, this time in the Balkans between the First and the Second Balkan Wars. Shqiperi is modeled on Albania, and the story itself is modeled on the story of Otto Witte.
- Fort Pillow (2006): A historical novel detailing the Battle of Fort Pillow.
- "Under Saint Peter's" (2007): Short story found in The Secret History of Vampires (edited by Darrell Schweitzer) and We Install and Other Stories. This is Turtledove's rare concession to the secret history genre, which he professes to have little interest in writing. In 2005, viewpoint character Pope Benedict XVI (unnamed but recognizable) is led by an eccentric priest to a secret bunker under the Vatican for a little-known initiation that is undertaken by each new pontiff since the days of Saint Peter.
- The Man with the Iron Heart (2008): Reinhard Heydrich survives an assassination attempt in Czechoslovakia by partisans and later goes on to lead an insurgent movement against the Allied occupation of Germany. Turtledove mixes information gleaned from authentic German documents and intentions with another historical transplant, which in this case is the Iraqi insurgency of 2003 being transplanted to mid-1940s Germany.
- After the Downfall (2008): A Wehrmacht officer is transported into a fantasy world during the Fall of Berlin at the end of World War II. The story resembles the formula of Edgar Rice Burroughs and L. Sprague de Camp, mixed with Turtledove's usual allegorism as the central character sees parallels between the politics and notions of his new world and those of the world he just left.
- Reincarnations (2009): A limited edition hardcover containing eight stories, including six never before reprinted and one original story.
- Give Me Back My Legions! (2009): A historical novel detailing the events leading up to the Battle of the Teutoburg Forest, as well as the battle itself.
- Joe Steele (2015): Expanded from the short story of the same name, the alternative history deals with Joseph Stalin, whose Americanized name is the title character, having been born and raised in America. When the life of New York State Governor Franklin D. Roosevelt is ended by a fire at the New York State Executive Mansion, the Democratic Party has little choice but to nominate the up-and-coming Steele as its candidate for the 1932 Presidential election. The novel mirrors Stalin's real world acts with actions taken by Steele through the Great Depression, the lead-up to World War II, and the ensuing Cold War through the eyes of a president with the soul of a tyrant.
- The House of Daniel (2016). Historical fantasy: during the Great Depression, a young "Okie" joins the roving church-sponsored baseball team of the title. As the team travels to play against the home teams of various western American towns, the young man learns about the culture of the towns they visit and has passing encounters with vampires, werewolves, zombies, and other magical beings.
- Through Darkest Europe (2018): Set in modern times in which Islam developed science, technology, and enlightenment, but Western Europe remained a hotbed of Christian fundamentalism. The working title for the book was God Wills It.
- Alpha and Omega (2019): A depiction of the End of Days, based on Christian legend.
- And the Last Trump Shall Sound (2020), co-authored with James K. Morrow and Cat Rambo: Set in an alternate future where Donald Trump was reelected in 2020.
- Or Even Eagle Flew (2021): Amelia Earhart does not go missing in 1937 and later joins the Eagle Squadrons of the British Royal Air Force to fight against the Nazis in World War II.
- The Best of Harry Turtledove. A short story collection.
- Three Miles Down (2022): A first contact story set in the 1970s.
- The Wages of Sin (2023): An alternate history set in a nineteenth-century England ravaged by HIV.
- Powerless (2025): An alternate history set in a socialist California. The story expands on Vaclav Havel's essay The Power of the Powerless. The main character starts a chain of events by refusing to hang a propaganda poster in his small shop. The novel is a finalist for the 2025 Prometheus Award.

=== Short stories ===
- "A Massachusetts Yankee in King Arthur’s Court" (1992): John F. Kennedy is briefly transported back in time to ancient Britain, where he meets up King Arthur of Camelot. The story is collected in Mike Resnick's 1992 alternate history anthology Alternate Kennedys.
- Uncle Alf (2002): A novella included in the collections Alternate Generals II and Atlantis and Other Places. The German Empire has won World War I when Alfred von Schlieffen lived to see his Schlieffen Plan executed successfully and Germany occupies France and Belgium. In 1929, Feldgendarmerie Sergeant Adolf Hitler is sent to occupied France to hunt down Jacques Doriot, an agitator against the German occupation of France.

== Nonfiction ==
- The Chronicle of Theophanes, Harry Turtledove editor and translator, University of Pennsylvania Press, 1982. A translation of an important Byzantine historical text, completed soon after Harry Turtledove's PhD studies.

== Web publishing ==
- Winter of Our Discontent: The Impeachment and Trial of John F. Kennedy (2007). Fragment of a novel, co-written with the television series creator Bryce Zabel. After John Kennedy survives the attack at Dealey Plaza unharmed, the resulting investigation sets events in motion that tear apart his administration. Zabel eventually published the final work as a solo project entitled Surrounded by Enemies: What If Kennedy Had Survived Dallas? in 2013.
- Turtledove, Harry (2009). "The House That George Built". Babe Ruth remains a minor league player for most of his career until he retires and opens a Baltimore pub. In 1941, Ruth reminisces about what could have been with a skeptical H. L. Mencken.
- Vilcabamba (February 3, 2010). After an alien race known as the Krolp subjugates most of the world in the 22nd century, a rump United States and Canada that run along the Rocky Mountains and the Wasatch Range must decide how to respond to the aliens' plans to violate the treaty that guarantees the country's sovereignty. The story is told from the perspective of US President and Canadian Prime Minister Harris Moffatt III, and parallels the treatment of indigenous peoples of the Americas. The title is a reference to the city of Vilcabamba, Peru, the site of the last Inca resistance to Spanish colonization.
- Turtledove, Harry (April 14, 2011). "Shtetl Days". Tor Books. After a Nazi victory in the Second World War, Aryan historical reenactors portray the prewar lifestyle of the exterminated Jews at a tourist attraction. However, many of the actors come to identify more with the Jews than with their German heritage.
- Lee at the Alamo (September 7, 2011). When Texas secedes from the Union in 1861, Lieutenant-Colonel Robert E. Lee, acting commander of the Department of Texas, decides to defend US munitions at the Alamo and launches the first battle of a slightly different American Civil War.
- Turtledove, Harry (January 8, 2014). "The Eighth-Grade History Class Visits the Hebrew Home for the Aging". Tor.com. Macmillan. In 2013, an elderly Jewish woman shares stories of her life with a group of eighth graders.
- Hail! Hail! (2018). Shortly after the release of their film Duck Soup in mid-1934, the Marx Brothers visit Nacogdoches, Texas, where all four of them are struck by lightning and are transported back in time to December 15, 1826; arrive in the same town; and interfere with the Fredonian Rebellion.
