= Vilcabamba =

Vilcabamba may refer to:

- Vilcabamba, Peru, capital and last stronghold of the Neo-Inca state from 1539 to 1572
- Vilcabamba, Ecuador, town in the province of Loja in southern Ecuador
- Vilcabamba District, La Convención, one of eleven districts of the La Convención Province in the Cusco Region in Peru
- Vilcabamba mountain range, 85 kilometres (53 miles) long mountain range in the Cusco Region of southern Peru
- "Vilcabamba" (short story), 2010 science-fiction story by Harry Turtledove
