= Visitor from the East =

- Short story by Harry Turtledove
- Country: United States
- Language: English
- Genre: Alternate history

Publication
- Published in: Thirty Days Later: Steaming Forward: 30 Adventures in Time; The Best of Harry Turtledove
- Publication type: Print
- Published in English: May 2016
- Series: State of Jefferson Stories

Visitor from the East (2016) is an alternate history short story written by Harry Turtledove. It is the first of two short works published in Thirty Days Later: Steaming Forward: 30 Adventures in Time (A.J. Sikes, B.J. Sikes, and Dover Whitecliff, ed., Thinking Ink Press 2016) and would later be reprinted in Turtledove's short-story collection The Best of Harry Turtledove in 2021. It is also the first short story in the State of Jefferson Stories.

== Plot ==
The story is essentially a vignette, set in August 1979, spotlighting the Sasquatch Jefferson State Governor Bill Williamson's meeting/photo-op with the Yeti Lama of Tibet, who has been living in-exile in Jefferson ever since China's Invasion of Tibet in 1959. The story gives a quick sketch of Jefferson's history and comparatively open culture, and hints at the broad role sasquatches have played in the Pacific Northwest of the United States.
