= Windycon =

Literature convention held in Oak Brook, Illinois, US

- Status: Active
- Genre: Science Fiction/Fantasy Convention
- Locations: Oak Brook, Illinois
- Country: United States
- Inaugurated: October 25-27, 1974
- Most recent: November 7-9, 2025
- Next event: October 9-11, 2026
- Organizer: ISFiC
- Filing status: Non-profit
- Website: www.windycon.org

Windycon is a science fiction and fantasy literature convention held annually in the Chicago, Illinois area. In the past, it was held on the weekend closest to Veterans Day; as of 2026, the date has been moved to the second weekend of October.

ISFiC, the parent corporation that runs Windycon, was founded in 1973 in Chicago. The first Windycon was held the following year and has been held annually ever since either in Chicago or a Chicago suburb. It is a general interest convention.

ISFiC and Windycon were founded to raise the profile of fandom in Chicago in preparation for a Worldcon bid. In 1982, Chicon IV was the result. From its small beginnings, Windycon has grown to have an annual membership hovering around 1300. It is the largest of the two fan-run Chicago conventions.

Annually since 1986, ISFiC has hosted a writers contest, open to unpublished authors. The contest is judged by professional authors and editors. Separately, Windycon has hosted a writers' workshop under the coordination of Richard Chwedyk since 2000. From 2004 to 2015, ISFiC Press, the publishing arm of Windycon's parent organization, published a Guest of Honor book to be released at the convention.
