= The Last Article =

- Short story by Harry Turtledove
- Country: United States
- Language: English
- Genre: Alternate history

Publication
- Published in: Kaleidoscope; The Best Military Science Fiction of the Twentieth Century; The Best of Harry Turtledove
- Publication type: Print
- Publication date: January 1988

"The Last Article" (1988), is an alternate history short story by Harry Turtledove.

The story describes a German invasion of British India and the reaction of the Nazi occupation authorities to the nonviolent resistance and pacifism of Mahatma Gandhi and his followers. This story was later reprinted in Turtledove's short-story collection Kaleidoscope in 1990, the variety showcase The Best Military Science Fiction of the Twentieth Century in 2001, and in Turtledove's short-story collection The Best of Harry Turtledove in 2021.

== Plot summary ==
Germany's success in World War II has led to their invasion of the British Raj in 1947, resulting in the British Indian Army being decisively defeated. Rather than struggling for independence from the Crown, Gandhi and his friend Jawaharlal Nehru find themselves in the position of resisting Nazi occupation using the techniques that were successfully employed against the British. Although Nehru has a general concept of the inherently immoral nature of Nazi ideology, Gandhi thinks they still can be persuaded, not heeding the warning from an Austrian Jew named Simon Wiesenthal, who was able to flee occupied Poland to India.

The Nazis, however, led by Field Marshal Walther Model, are completely unmoved by Gandhi's strategy. They view themselves as a master race and have no moral qualms about killing those who resist non-violently (or even those who do not resist at all, if they are of a certain race). In the end the movement collapses as it proves unable to deal with the savagery of Nazism.

== Themes ==
Gandhi assumes a moral equivalence between the Nazi and British imperialists, naively dismissing reports otherwise; the story makes clear that this is a lethal mistake stemming from Gandhi's reluctance to entertain the idea that his moral and ethical assumptions are not shared in common among all human groups. Loyalty is explored as a powerful but amoral force. Gandhi is loyal to his concepts of passive resistance, however poorly they fit the situation or inevitably they lead to violence; the Indians are loyal to Gandhi, and some die for it; Model is loyal to his rank and volk; the British are loyal to their ideas of decency and mercy and defend them to the last, through the medium of war.

The story illustrates the weakness inherent in Gandhi's – and later Martin Luther King Jr.'s – nonviolence movement, the success of which depends on a reasoned appeal to the enemy's conscience—that is, on the ability to arouse shame and remorse in the oppressor, who eventually relents. This was a plausible strategy against British imperialism or American institutional racism, as the notion of oppression clashes unpleasantly with the values espoused by these nations. Historically, ideals of freedom, justice, and equality for all citizens are at the root of the British and American political system and, perhaps more important, the religion and national self-image of the people. The story explores the strategic difference between opposing a tolerant competitor, such as the British, and opposing a remorselessly violent foe, suggesting that violent resistance to malign forces like Nazism, such as the Warsaw Ghetto Uprising, is more likely to succeed than a pacifistic approach. Violence does not guarantee success, however; the Warsaw uprising is indicated as a failure.

Field Marshal Model compares the Nazi empire with the Roman Empire facing the early Christians, pointing out that Rome's collapse came as a result of its tolerance of a force that sought to undermine it. The story does not characterize Model as a bloodthirsty savage; rather, he is a merely a professional doing his job. Turtledove provides an appearance by Jurgen Stroop, the SS officer responsible for the Warsaw Ghetto massacre, to contrast Stroop's mindless savagery and Model's workmanlike, impassive decimation of the Indian resistance.

== See also ==
- Hypothetical Axis victory in World War II. It includes an extensive list of other Wikipedia articles regarding works of Nazi Germany/Axis/World War II alternate history.
- Mahatma Gandhi and the Jewish question
- List of artistic depictions of Mahatma Gandhi
