= Rulers of the Darkness =

2002 novel by Harry Turtledove

- Author: Harry Turtledove
- Cover artist: Bob Eggleton
- Language: English
- Series: Darkness
- Genre: Fantasy
- Publisher: Tor Books
- Publication date: 2002
- Publication place: United States
- Media type: Print
- Preceded by: Through the Darkness
- Followed by: Jaws of Darkness

Rulers of the Darkness (2002) is the fourth book in The Darkness Series by Harry Turtledove.

== Plot summary ==
Talsu spends a few months in a Jelgavan jail and, coupled with Skarnu's adventures, makes it clear that many Valmierans and Jelgavans support Algarve. Algarvians strike at the Naantali Project and kill Siuntio. Gyongyos loses more islands to Kuusamo and Istvan's unit is moved from Unkerlant to the island of Becsehely. Algarvians try to pinch off Unkerlanters in Durrwangen, leading to the Battle of Durrwangen. Most surviving Kaunians in Forthweg now use Vanai's Forthwegian disguise, and Algarvians are unable to catch nearly as many as before. Algarvian progress in the summer against Durrwangen very slow, and Unkerlanters battle them to a standstill, then force them back into Grelz, ultimately overrunning the capital Herborn. Raniero, the puppet king of Grelz, is boiled in a pot by Swemmel. Sibiu liberated by Lagoas and Kuusamo, and Cornelu is poisoned by his wife, who is sentenced to beheading. Garivald finds his village and family annihilated by the fighting. Vanai ends up caught by the Algarvians.
