= Kaleidoscope (short story collection) =

1990 collection of short stories by Harry Turtledove

- First edition cover
- Author: Harry Turtledove
- Cover artist: Barclay Shaw
- Language: English
- Genre: Science fiction short stories
- Publisher: Ballantine Books
- Publication date: April 1990
- Publication place: United States
- Media type: Print (paperback)
- Pages: 249 pp
- ISBN: 0-345-36477-5

Kaleidoscope is a collection of science fiction, fantasy and alternate history stories by Harry Turtledove, first published in paperback by Ballantine Books in April 1990. It was later gathered together with his novel Noninterference and collection Earthgrip into the omnibus collection 3 X T, published in hardcover by Baen Books in 2004.

The book contains thirteen short short stories and novelettes.

== Short stories ==
- "And so to Bed"
- "Bluff"
- "A Difficult Undertaking"
- "The Weather's Fine"
- "Crybaby"
- "Hindsight"
- "Gentlemen of the Shade"
- "The Boring Beast" (with Kevin R. Sanders)
- "The Road Not Taken"
- "The Castle of the Sparrowhawk"
- "The Summer Garden"
- "The Last Article"
- "The Girl who Took Lessons"
