= Zigeuner (short story) =

2017 science fiction short story by Harry Turtledove

- Short story by Harry Turtledove
- Country: United States
- Language: English
- Genres: Science fiction, alternate history

Publication
- Published in: Asimov's Science Fiction (September/October 2017 issue); The Best of Harry Turtledove
- Publication type: Print
- Published in English: August 2017

"Zigeuner" is a science fiction short story by Harry Turtledove, first published in the September/October issue of Asimov's Science Fiction Magazine in August, 2017. It was reprinted in The Year's Best Science Fiction: Thirty-Fifth Annual Collection, Gardner Dozois, ed. St. Martin's, 2018. It won the Sidewise Award for Alternate History for best short form work in 2017. It would also be reprinted in Turtledove's short-story collection The Best of Harry Turtledove in 2021.

== Plot ==
In October 1944, Joseph Stieglitz, a Hauptsturmführer of the SS, is stationed in Hungary shortly after Germany invaded the country and replaced Miklos Horthy with Ferenc Szálasi. Stieglitz is hopeful that Szálasi and his Arrow Cross Party will be motivated to fight off the Red Army, which has just crossed the country's eastern border and launched the Budapest offensive. In the meantime, Stieglitz is tasked with rounding up a village of Romani people (called Zigeuner in German), in western Hungary.

A Hungarian driver recounts Adolf Hitler's service in the Austro-Hungarian Army on the Eastern Front of World War I. As Stieglitz arranges for the Romani village's population to be placed on a train for occupied Poland, and, implicitly, their deaths, he further reflects on Hitler's antiziganism, which developed on the Eastern Front in part because of the efforts of Romani on behalf of Russia (who he reportedly saw stealing horses, telegraph wire and boots, leading to unnecessary deaths and injuries of German troops). Moreover, Hitler became sympathetic to the Jews after witnessing the Russians abuse them. Though Romani, communists, and homosexuals continue to be persecuted, Hitler and the Nazis are in fact tolerant towards Jews. (Note: In real life, Hitler was exempted from conscription by the Austro-Hungarian Army on medical grounds, moved to Munich, and fought for the Bavarian Army on the Western Front. Jews were a central target of Nazism and made up a plurality of Holocaust victims.)

The Romani are deported, and it is revealed that Stieglitz is actually a secular Jew. He encounters a field rabbi, who reminds Stieglitz that their people have been made to suffer as much as the Romani have, and that Stieglitz could have just as easily wound up on the train. Stieglitz angrily threatens the rabbi, and then goes about his business.

== Award nomination ==
Zigeuner won the 2017 Sidewise Award for Alternate History Short Form award.

== See also ==
- History of antisemitism
- Holocaust victims
- Nazi racial theories
