= Out of the Darkness (Turtledove novel) =

Novel by Harry Turtledove

- Author: Harry Turtledove
- Cover artist: Bob Eggleton
- Language: English
- Series: Darkness
- Genre: Fantasy
- Publisher: Tor Books
- Publication date: 2004
- Publication place: United States
- Media type: Print
- Preceded by: Jaws of Darkness

Out of the Darkness (2004) by Harry Turtledove is the sixth and final book in the Darkness series.

== Plot summary ==
Spinello is poisoned by Vanai. The southern front is in Yanina, which is in a bad position. The Unkerlanters use Yaninan forces as if they were penal battalions, while Algarvians start killing Yaninans for magical energy in retaliation for Yanina's switch to Unkerlant. In Jelgava, close to the Bratanu Mountains on the border with Algarve, Leino and Xavega are killed by an Algarvian magical trap. Puppet King Beornwulf installed in Forthweg, and Ealstan is drafted. Kuusamans and Lagoans occupy Valmiera. Unkerlanters push into Algarve, first on the southern front then the northern. Algarvians develop the superstick, first using it on Unkerlanters on the southern front. Ealstan in Unkerlanter army is having to reduce his own hometown, Gromheort, in which Algarvians were holed up. Algarvians come out with other desperate magics, some demonic, others new and unreliable, but appear to have given up killing Kaunians for the most part. Pekka destroys Becsehely in first test of divergent blast. Krasta has a baby boy, which she at first names Valnu (later Gainibu), but which turns out to be Lurcanio's; Merkela cuts all her hair off in punishment. Unkerlanters and Kuusamans meet at Torgavi on the Albi in the north of Algarve. Skarnu becomes marquis of Pavilosta. Lurcanio's army surrenders, followed by Gromheort. Ealstan is wounded, discharged from army, and stays in Gromheort with his family. Mezentio's palace falls, Algarve surrenders. Talsu released from prison (again) and expelled with his wife to Kuusamo. Lurcanio, who had been turned over to the Valmierans, is executed by firing squad. Ceorl is killed when he and Garivald escape from a mining camp. Garivald makes his way back to Obilot.
