= Through the Darkness (novel) =

2001 novel by Harry Turtledove

- Author: Harry Turtledove
- Cover artist: Bob Eggleton
- Language: English
- Series: Darkness
- Genre: Fantasy
- Publisher: Tor Books
- Publication date: March 2001
- Publication place: United States
- Media type: Print
- Pages: 512 (Paperback)
- ISBN: 978-0-312-87825-2
- Preceded by: Darkness Descending
- Followed by: Rulers of the Darkness

Through the Darkness is a 2001 fantasy novel by Harry Turtledove, the third book in the Darkness series.

== Plot summary ==
Algarve renews an assault in the south of Unkerlant toward the Mamming Hills, which is Unkerlant's source of cinnabar, leading to the mammoth Battle of Sulingen. Kaunian refugees begin showing up in Zuwayza, which takes them in; other Kaunians get away from a caravan in Valmiera and come to the attention of Skarnu and his friends (who had blown up the caravan to disrupt the Algarvians) or are set loose in a Lagoan raid on a camp in Valmiera. Leofsig is killed by Sidroc, who joins the Plegmund's Brigade. Istvan and his squad accidentally eat goat stew in a raid on a camp in Unkerlant's western forest and are purified by their captain. The Algarvians kill Kaunians in the Land of the Ice People in an attempt to use magic against the Lagoans, but the magic from the killed Kaunians slaughters the Algarvian army instead, and Algarve is forced to withdraw from the continent completely, leaving it to the Lagoans. The wear on the Algarvians is showing as they start to rely more on Sibians, Forthwegians and the unreliable Yaninans to keep up the fight against Unkerlant. The Battle of Sulingen is won by the Unkerlanters that winter, with Trasone dying in the final scene in the book. Algarve is on the way to losing the war. The Naantali Project starts and the Kuusamans take Obuda.
