= Darkness Descending =

2000 novel by Harry Turtledove

- Author: Harry Turtledove
- Cover artist: Bob Eggleton
- Language: English
- Series: Darkness
- Genre: Fantasy
- Publisher: Tor Books
- Publication date: 2000
- Publication place: United States
- Media type: Print
- Preceded by: Into the Darkness
- Followed by: Through the Darkness

Darkness Descending (2000) by Harry Turtledove is the second book in the Darkness series.

== Plot summary ==
Algarve starts killing Kaunians as their advance toward Cottbus starts to stall, which both causes Kuusamo to enter the war and Unkerlant to start killing its own peasants for magical power, and the Algarvians are halted by mud, winter, Unkerlanter behemoths with snowshoes, and logistics. Tealdo is killed in Thalfang, just outside Cottbus, and Unkerlant pushes back into the northwest corner of Grelz. Kaunians are herded into ghettos in Forthweg's cities and larger towns. Pekka's first "divergent" series is interrupted by the Algarvian magical blitz on Yliharma. Gyongyos attacks Unkerlant in the west and pushes through the mountains through which the border passes. Lagoas invades the Land of the Ice People.
