= Atlantis and Other Places =

2010 collection of short stories by Harry Turtledove

- First edition
- Author: Harry Turtledove
- Cover artist: Steve Stone
- Language: English
- Genre: Alternate history, Science fiction, Fantasy
- Published: December 2010
- Publisher: Roc Books
- Publication place: United States
- Media type: Print

Atlantis and Other Places is a collection of short stories by Harry Turtledove. Published by Roc Books in December 2010, the collection includes two stories from Turtledove's Atlantis series Audubon in Atlantis and The Scarlet Band along with 10 other unrelated stories.

== Stories ==
- "Audubon in Atlantis" (Part of the Atlantis Series)
- "Bedfellows"
- "News From the Front"
- "The Catcher in the Rhine"
- "The Daimon"
- "Farmers' Law"
- "Occupation Duty"
- "The Horse of Bronze"
- "The Genetics Lecture"
- "Someone is Stealing the Great Throne Rooms of the Galaxy"
- "Uncle Alf" (previously published in Turtledove's edited anthology Alternate Generals II)
- "The Scarlet Band" (Part of the Atlantis series)
