= Jaws of Darkness =

2003 novel by Harry Turtledove

- Author: Harry Turtledove
- Cover artist: Bob Eggleton
- Language: English
- Series: Darkness
- Genre: Fantasy
- Publisher: Tor Books
- Publication date: 2003
- Publication place: United States
- Media type: Print
- Preceded by: Rulers of the Darkness
- Followed by: Out of the Darkness

Jaws of Darkness (2003) by Harry Turtledove is the fifth book in the Darkness series.

== Plot summary ==
Habakkuk, a dragon carrier carved out of an iceberg, is introduced, with Leino serving on board her. Vanai has been thrown into Eoforwic's Kaunian Quarter, and later escapes during an Unkerlanter bombing raid, and is found by Ealstan who had disguised himself as an Algarvian. Krasta has sex with Valnu and Lurcanio in the same day and gets pregnant from one of them but is not sure which. Algarve invents "guided eggs". Istvan and his friends are captured on Becsehely by Kuusamans and taken to Obuda. Valmierans finally allowed to fight for Algarve as invasion looms and troop shortages worsen. Kuusamans and Lagoans fool the Algarvians by massing ships and troops on the strait across from Valmiera, and pretending to send a fleet eastward toward Gyongyos, but instead using the latter fleet to invade Jelgava. At this time, Unkerlant launches a massive offensive which sweeps the Algarvians out of northern Unkerlant and back into Forthweg to the Twegen River, while consolidating their hold on Grelz. The Eoforwic Uprising starts when Unkerlanter armies are well into Forthweg. Unkerlant launches major offensive against Zuwayza, forcing it to surrender with severe conditions, although it keeps its independence. Yanina switches over to Unkerlant's side as soon as the fighting crosses its borders. Sidroc's mixed regiment has to do a fighting retreat through Yanina. The Algarvians abandon and withdraw from Valmiera, enabling Skarnu to return home. Algarvians pushed out of most of Jelgava. Istvan's regiment sacrifices itself to vainly attack the Kuusaman occupation on Obuda, although Istvan and Kun escape by inducing diarrhea. Eoforwic Uprising suppressed by Algarvians, although Unkerlanters have not made more than a halfhearted attempt to cross the Twegen.
