= Richard Chwedyk =

American poet

Richard Chwedyk (born 1955) is an American science fiction author. In 2003, he won the 2002 Nebula Award for Best Novella for his story "Brontë's Egg."

Chwedyk's first published story was "Getting Along with Larga," which was the first winner of the ISFiC Writer's contest in 1986. In 1988, he won the contest again with his story "A Man Makes a Machine," which went on to be published as Chwedyk's first professional sale in Amazing Stories in November, 1990.

In addition to writing fiction, Chwedyk has also published a number of poems and has coordinated poetry slams in Chicago, where he makes his home.

In 2000, Chwedyk oversaw the writer's workshop at Chicon 2000, the Worldcon, and has overseen several other writers workshops at science fiction conventions over the years, often running the workshop at Windycon.

Richard Chwedyk is married to Chicago poet Pamela Miller Chwedyk.

In 2009, he donated his archive to the department of Rare Books and Special Collections at Northern Illinois University.

== Bibliography ==
=== Short fiction ===
- "Auteur Theory" F&SF 95/1 [564] (Jul 1998)

Saurs stories

- "The Measure of All Things", F&SF, January 2001
- "Brontë's Egg", F&SF, August 2002
- "In Tibor's Cardboard Castle", F&SF, October/November 2004
- "Orfy", F&SF, September/October 2010
- "The Man Who Put the Bomp", F&SF, March/April 2017

=== Poetry ===
- "A Few Kind Words for A. E. Van Vogt" (2002). Published in Tales of the Unanticipated 23 (2002) and in Year's Best SF 8
- "Rich and Pam Go to Fermilab and Later See a Dead Man", Strange Horizons, 17 March 2003
