= ISFiC =

Non-profit science fiction organization

ISFiC, or "Illinois Science Fiction in Chicago", is a non-profit organization that runs the Windycon science fiction convention and the ISFiC Press.

ISFiC was formed in 1973 as a coalition of the various science fiction clubs in Chicago, Illinois, United States. The founders of the organization include Mike and Carol Resnick.

== ISFiC Press ==
In 2004, ISFiC started up a small press, ISFiC Press. It often produces books by the guest of honor at Windycon, an annual Chicago science fiction convention, launching the appropriate title at the convention. Their first book was Robert J. Sawyer's Relativity. It was released on November 12, 2004, and included an introduction by Mike Resnick, an afterword by Valerie Broege and a cover by Jael. They have published additional books annually, with works winning the Aurora Award and being nominated for the Hugo Award. Relativity won the Prix Aurora Award for best English Work (Other) for 2004.

ISFiC Press released its first two novels, Every Inch a King, by Harry Turtledove with a cover by Bob Eggleton, and The Cunning Blood, by Jeff Duntemann with a cover by Todd Cameron Hamilton on November 11, 2005.

In 2006, ISFiC Press published its first non-fiction book, Worldcon Guest of Honor Speeches, edited by Mike Resnick and Joe Siclari, which was nominated for a Hugo Award for Best Related Book. In November of that year they published Outbound, a collection of short stories by Jack McDevitt.

In August 2012 ISFiC Press issued its first electronic book, Win Some, Lose Some: The Hugo Award Winning (and Nominated) Short Science Fiction and Fantasy of Mike Resnick (by Mike Resnick; Cover by Vincent Di Fate) as well as the hardcover edition of the same title. The e-book is offered in EPUB and MOBI format. The publication of this book is coincident with Chicon 7, the 70th World Science Fiction Convention, which was held in ISFiC Press's hometown of Chicago.

The publisher and editor of ISFiC Press from its inception until 2012 was Steven H Silver and the business manager is Bill Roper.

== ISFiC Writers Contest ==
In addition to sponsoring Windycon, ISFiC also sponsors an annual writing contest for new authors. The first winner of the ISFiC Writers Contest was Richard Chwedyk in 1986.
