= Hail! Hail! =

2018 novella by Harry Turtledove

Hail! Hail
- Author: Harry Turtledove
- Language: English
- Genre: Alternate history, time travel
- Publisher: Swallow's End Publishing
- Publication date: June 5, 2018
- Publication place: United States
- Media type: e-book

Hail! Hail! is a novella written by Harry Turtledove. It was published in e-book format by Swallow's End Publishing, June 5, 2018.

== Plot summary ==
Shortly after the release of their film Duck Soup in mid-1934, the Marx Brothers eventually visit Nacogdoches, Texas and all four of them get caught in a lightning storm that transports them back in time to December 15, 1826, and arrive in the same town just as when the Fredonian Rebellion is breaking out.

Having just completed their film Duck Soup, about a fictional Republic of Freedonia, the brothers actually know about the Fredonian Rebellion in some detail, particularly Julius "Groucho" Marx, who serves as the story's point of view. When they encounter Adolphus Sterne, the man who supplied the Rebellion, the Marx Brothers, despairing of ever returning to their own time, reveal their identity to Sterne, and agree to help the rebellion. This decision proves to have dire consequences for history resulting in the creation of a slave-holding "Confederal government" with a flag consisting of a white St. Andrew's Cross and 15 red stars well into the 20th century.
