= Sentry Peak =

2000 novel by Harry Turtledove

Sentry Park
- First edition
- Author: Harry Turtledove
- Cover artist: Carol Heyer
- Language: English
- Series: War Between the Provinces
- Genre: Fantasy
- Publisher: Baen Books
- Publication date: September 1, 2000
- Publication place: United States
- Media type: Print (Paperback)
- Followed by: Marching Through Peachtree

Sentry Peak is a 2000 fantasy novel written by Harry Turtledove. It is the first novel in the War Between the Provinces series, a fantasy version retelling of the American Civil War.

== Plot ==
When Avram (= Abraham Lincoln) becomes King of Detina (Detinu is "United" spelled backwards - a parody of the USA) after the death of his father King Buchan (= James Buchanan), he declares he intends to liberate the blond serfs from their ties to the land. The northern provinces (= Southern United States), where most of the serfs live, do not accept his lordship. The hot north is a land of broad estates, whose noble overlords take the serfs' labor and give back next to nothing. Those provinces secede from Detina, choosing Avram's cousin, Grand Duke Geoffrey (= Jefferson Davis), as their king in his place.

Avram refuses to let Geoffrey rule the north without a challenge. The southern provinces (= the Union), full of merchants and smallholders, stand solidly behind him, so he sends armies clad in gray against the north. Geoffrey raises his own army, and arrays his men in blue made from the indigo much raised on northern estates to distinguish them from the southrons. This begins the Detinan Civil War.

In Sentry Peak, the story begins with Detina General Guildenstern (= Union General William Rosecrans; Shakespeare's Hamlet has minor characters Rosencrantz and Guildenstern) going on his war unicorn to meet Thraxton the Braggart (= Confederate General Braxton Bragg) of the northern provinces, for a clash at Sentry Peak (= Lookout Mountain) near Rising Rock (= Chattanooga, Tennessee, whose name supposedly means "rock rising to a point" in the Creek language). Guildenstern is accompanied by Lieutenant General George, nicknamed "Doubting George" (= George Henry Thomas, commander of the Union XIV Corps). Everything else in the story is a parody in a vein similar to these examples.

== Reception ==
Kirkus Reviews dismissed the novel as "fairly typical Turtledove [content], with lots of talk and maneuvering, and very little actual fighting", and concluded by saying "shrug, so what?" Publishers Weekly was more positive, noting that in addition to "a treasure trove of japes and wordplays", the novel also has "some serious and cogent thinking on the position of minorities, the art of command (as practiced both well and badly) and the Civil War", as well as "some exacting tests of (...) cultural literacy" — if one can "resist the temptation to fling the book down."

Steven H Silver found the puns on the names of historical figures and locations to be "clever" but also "distract[ing]", and emphasized that the characterization was done in "broad strokes (...) relying on the reader's knowledge of [the characters'] historical models to supply the rest", with the result that readers who are not already "Civil War aficionados" will find these characters "flat"; Silver also faulted the novel's focus on battle scenes to the exclusion of "civilian culture".
