= The Darkness Series =

Series of fantasy novels by Harry Turtledove

Darkness
- Into the Darkness (1999); Darkness Descending (2000); Through the Darkness (2001); Rulers of the Darkness (2002); Jaws of Darkness (2003); Out of the Darkness (2004)
- Author: Harry Turtledove
- Country: United States
- Language: English
- Genre: Fantasy
- Published: 1999–2004
- Media type: Print (hardback & paperback)

Darkness, also known as World at War, is a series of six fantasy novels by Harry Turtledove.

Though a fantasy, its general history, geography, and combatants are analogs of World War II, called the "Derlavai War" in this universe. Many of its characters are also the equivalents of historical people. Magic and other fantastic beasts, like dragons, are also stand-ins for World War II technology. Important battles in the series are also based on famous World War II battles. For example, the Battle of Sulingen is an analog to the Battle of Stalingrad.

== Novels ==
- Into the Darkness (1999)
- Darkness Descending (2000)
- Through the Darkness (2001)
- Rulers of the Darkness (2002)
- Jaws of Darkness (2003)
- Out of the Darkness (2004)

== World of Derlavai ==
Most of the action in the series takes place on the main continent of Derlavai, located in the southern hemisphere of an unnamed planet. There are also some lesser land masses and island chains mentioned in the story and on the map included in the novels. The planet also has the smaller continents of Siaulia and The Land of the Ice People.

There are only 12 independent countries: Algarve, Forthweg, Gyongyos, Jelgava, Sibiu, Kuusamo, Lagoas, Ortah, Unkerlant, Valmiera, Yanina, and Zuwayza. There are also three dependent territories (Bari, Grelz, and Rivaroli). Populations are for the most part homogeneous enough that a difference in hair color is easily enough to make one stand out. The vast majority of the members of a given Derlavaian ethnic group have the same hair and eye color combination.

All nations in the Darkness series are monarchies with the exception of Kuusamo, in which seven princes have a hereditary power-sharing arrangement. While by no means all absolute monarchies, in all of them kings (or princes in Kuusamo) seem to have the executive power. There are foreign ministers, but no prime ministers and no cabinets - a foreign minister evidently reporting directly to the King. None of the people have family names, even if they are members of the nobility. To the extent that monarchs are limited in their power, the limitation comes mainly from hereditary aristocracies which still maintain many privileges of feudal times.

The nations in the Darkness series do not have randomly invented names for their people and locations. Rather, each nation has personal and geographical names taken from a real nation on Earth. Turtledove has, however, mixed up the attributes so that any given Derlavaian kingdom is not instantly recognizable as a cognate of the countries which took part in World War II. For example, Unkerlant has Germanic (German, Low German, and Frankish) place and personal names. Forthweg has a Germanic language, Old English. Similarly, the Algarvic nations all speak Latin-derived languages: Algarve speaks Italian, Lagoas has Portuguese, and Sibiu Romanian. Kaunian languages are based on modern Baltic languages - Lithuanian is Classical Kaunian and Latvian for Valmerian and Jelgavian.

Unkerlant, though German-speaking, is an unmistakable Russia in both its culture and politics. On the other hand, Kuusamo - though playing the strategic role of the United States - has a Scandinavian culture, fitting with its Finnish language. Similarly, while politically and strategically Algarve is a clear analogue of Nazi Germany - including its committing genocide against the Kaunians/Jews - its culture seems more Italian than German, fitting with its language.

== Magic ==
Magic in the Darkness series is not created by mages but rather harnessed by them. The mages of Derlavai gather magical power from the various power points scattered around the planet and the ley lines which link them, a recent discovery made only 200 years before the start of the books. Mages can also gather magic from human sacrifice. As such, the operation of magic is heavily reliant on location. Large, modern cities tend to be located on or near strong power points which provide the energy for the operation of the city's lighting, heating and other comforts. In addition, large power points tend to be linked to greater numbers of ley lines, which are utilised for transportation between cities and towns.

=== Mages ===
There are fundamental laws of magic, which require intense studying to master in order to become a mage. Though popular "how-to" books for the general public do exist, the spells published in them are not always reliable, and can backfire in dangerous or embarrassing ways. Professional mages are divided into "theoretical" and "practical." Theoretical mages research the relationships and underlying laws governing the behaviour of matter and energy, formulate hypotheses expressed in complicated mathematical formulas, and devise careful experiments in order to prove or disprove these hypotheses empirically. Practical mages use the theories devised by theoretical mages to make devices that can be used by the general public.

=== Magic and Technology ===
Derlavai has gone through a "Thaumaturgical Revolution" instead of an Industrial Revolution, using magic as the basis for much of its technology. Because of magic, there appears to be less of a need for mass industry. There are plants producing pottery, for example, in large amounts, but behemoths and dragons are bred on farms and clothing appears to be made by tailors instead of in factories.

On the civilian scene, magic is much less important, being limited to applications such as rest boxes (an analogue to the refrigerator which operates by slowing the effects of time on its contents), lighting (in places where such sorcerous power is available) and ley line ships, while in the military magic is involved in the production and use of almost all their weapons and supplies.

Most of the magical items in the world of Derlavai are analogues to everyday, or military, devices in our world. While the series is more concerned with military affairs than with economic ones, it seems that there are three competing ways of producing things:

- By direct magic, using the law of similarity which can obviously be applied to mass production. This method is fast, but can produce inferior goods if not conducted with skill and effort.
- By artisans, who work by hand and use a limited amount of magic. Each profession has some spells, and the knowledge and use of them is considered a normal part of that trade rather than a form of magecraft.
- Mass production by machines, as in our world.

There is a mention of the Kuusamans rapidly building a new port in a newly conquered island by magic, which is evident from all buildings being the same (indicating that the spells made extensive use of the law of similarity). It is noted that only a country with many skilled mages could have spared the resources for such construction. In another place it is noted that printing is usually done by mechanical means, but the Valmieren resistance utilises magic for reproducing a propaganda sheet in order to avoid detection by the occupying authorities. The result of this magical duplication is readable, but the ink smudges easily as it was produced without the aid of a power point or an experienced mage.

=== Magical Items in the Darkness series ===
Crystals: Described as smooth spheres of glass, crystals are imbued with spells which allow them to be used for communication, and thus take the place of radios in the world. If operated away from a power point or ley line, they require regular recharging by some other means, which in one instance in the series involves the sacrifice of captive humans for their life energy which is used to power the crystal. Crystals can operate as videophones, showing an image of the person at the other end, as well as in audio-only mode. The emanations by which speech and images are transmitted between them are subject to interception by other mages, something at the forefront of the minds of most military planners in the series.

Eggs: The name given to the Derlavaian equivalent of bombs and shells, eggs are thin metal shells filled with magical energy which burst, or explode, when they impact a target or are triggered by an appropriate spell. A variety of uses for eggs are seen in the series. Armies launch them like shells from magically powered 'egg-tossers', which may be standalone devices or mounted on ley-line ships or behemoths. Dragons can carry eggs beneath their bellies for their fliers to drop on enemy forces or cities. Eggs may also be buried in the ground and enchanted to explode like landmines if they sense pressure, or can be buried along ley lines and set to explode if a ley line caravan passes over them, which simultaneously destroys the caravan and overloads the ley line's controlling spells. Leviathan riders also use eggs for mining enemy ships. Later in the series, the Algarvian army develops a hand held egg which can be thrown like a hand grenade; these eggs are encased in small pottery sugar bowls rather than metal shells. The reason for the term "egg" is never explicitly explained; apparently, originally armies used natural dragon eggs which are explosive in themselves, and then more powerful ones were developed by mages - but this is not explicitly stated.

Sticks: Sticks are the analogue to guns in the world of Derlavai. A stick emits a beam of energy which leaves behind a sharp scent like that of a nearby lightning strike. A soldier's stick is a large device and is activated when bare flesh such as an uncovered finger is inserted into its 'blazing hole'. The beam from a soldier's stick can burn a hole through a person with little difficulty, although they are largely ineffective against dragons and behemoths, which are not only naturally tough but also armored or painted silver to reflect beams. Smaller sticks are seen owned by civilians for blazing vermin or hunting game, or used by constables. Larger sticks, known as heavy sticks, are carried by behemoths on the battlefield, and can blaze through several men, another behemoth's armor or even take down dragons. Even larger heavy sticks can be used as fixed installations on the ground, used for air and sea defense, and carried on ley-line warships for use against ships, dragons and leviathans. Portable sticks used away from a power point or ley line require periodic recharging, which can be achieved in some unspecified way through the delivery of what is only described as 'charges' in supply wagons, or by the interventions of a mage drawing energy from a power point or sacrifice.

Rest crates: in function, much like a refrigerator or freezer, only considerably more effective. Rest crates are often mentioned as an archetypal application of modern sorcery, based on a spell used by the ancient Kaunian Empire to paralyze enemy soldiers. After counterspells were developed, it fell into disuse until modern systematic sorcery discovered that it operates by dramatically slowing the rate at which time affects objects under its influence. The rest crate, therefore, operates by slowing down the passage of time within its volume while its lid is shut. Food placed within it does not decay at a noticeable rate, but also requires no defrosting or other preparation before being used. A variant on this technique is also used by medical mages, who can slow down people suffering from serious injury in order to give them time to perform surgery, or to transport the victim to a place of treatment.

=== The Naantali Project ===
The equivalent of the Manhattan Project. The project included over a hundred mages working on a secret project for Kuusamo to create a new magical weapon. Due to the inability to hide their magical experiments, attempts were made by Algarve to disrupt it but this failed. At one point it is led by the viewpoint character Pekka.

The weapon requires grandparent and grandchild rats, rabbits or any other living creatures. Given the appropriate spells and mages able to perform them, the grandparent is pushed forward in time and the grandchild backward, killing them in the process and deriving enormous magical energy. Moreover, the mages themselves can deliver the energy to any target, by simply pointing out the spot on the globe. The magic can also create a protective spell to defend a city and deflect the magical energy hurled against it. It is speculated that using humans may make a more powerful magical explosion.

== Nations ==
Turtledove depicts his nations as being analogous to real European nations, including as far as possible actual linguistic relationships. For example, the Derlavaian analogs of the Germanic nations are the Algarvic nations of Algarve, Sibiu, and Lagoas, but to confuse things somewhat, each uses names drawn from a different Romance language. In addition, the vast majority of the individuals belonging to each language group share the same hair and eye color; Algarvic peoples have red hair and green eyes, Kaunian peoples have blond hair and blue eyes, and the Unkerlantic peoples and most others have dark hair and eyes.

=== Algarve ===
The equivalent to Nazi Germany, ruled by King Mezentio, who is analogous to Adolf Hitler. Algarve was defeated in the Six Years' War a generation ago, which was analogous to World War I, and forced to sign the humiliating Treaty of Tartus. Mezentio and his generals have spent much time and energy in preparing for a revenge on all their foes - especially the Kaunians. Located in the center of the continent, Algarve's people are characterized as red-headed and green-eyed, given to flamboyancy in word and gesture, and its males exhibit manifest macho behavior. Their typical dress includes kilts. To their enemies, Algarvians often seem arrogant and overbearing, and their conduct amply earns them the hatred of those who had the misfortune to live under their rule. While capable of great cruelty, Algarvians can also be quite generous on occasion; they doff their hats (sometimes literally) to an enemy whose conduct earned their grudging respect; and the same cultural traits which make them seem insufferably arrogant in victory also enable them to face adversity - even the certainty of imminent death - with admirable courage and fortitude. Algarvian names are drawn from Italian.

=== Forthweg ===
The equivalent to Poland. Its people are dark-haired, stocky, bearded, and prone to wearing long tunics. Part of the Kaunian Empire many centuries ago, about one-tenth of the prewar population were blond ethnic Kaunians, the only people in Derlavai to speak classical Kaunian as a birth language. Previous to Six Years' War Forthweg was partitioned between Algarve and Unkerlant, but later gained independence after that war. King Penda declared war on Algarve as part of the initial coalition against Algarve, but was attacked by both Algarve and Unkerlant and the country got re-partitioned; later, the whole is occupied by Algarve and at the end of the war is occupied by Unkerlant, which decides not to annex it outright but make it a satellite. Forthweg has a subtropical climate, with olive and citrus groves a prominent part of its agriculture. Forthwegians and Kaunians alike are extremely fond of gathering mushrooms. Forthweg's largest city as well as its capital is Eoforwic. Forthwegian names are drawn from Old English.

=== Gyongyos ===
The equivalent to Imperial Japan. Located in far-western Derlavai, it is separated from Unkerlant by a vast mountain range. Its people are described as tall, broad, and muscular, with wirey blonde hair and beards, and are the only nation described as having varying eye colors. Names in their language come from Hungarian. It is ruled by an ekrekek (emperor) instead of a king; he is seen as a direct descendant of the stars and is the person with whom the stars commune. Their religion is different from that of all other nations, distinguished by worship of the stars (those upon whom the stars shine are blessed, while those who are denied their light are cursed) and a very strong taboo against eating of the flesh of goats.

Gyongyos and Kuusamo had been fighting a war over possession of islands in the Bothenian Ocean when the Derlavian War broke out. In the second year of the war, Gyongyos attacked Unkerlant from the west, but never threatened the Unkerlant homeland in the same way Algarve did, partly because Unkerlant stretches a "fourth of the way around the world" and the valleys that Gyongyos seizes are very sparsely populated. For several years, the Kuusamans made slow headway against Gyongyos in the Bothenian theater, capturing several key islands. In the sixth year of the war, Kuusaman magic destroyed the island of Becsehely; Gyongyosian prisoners of war watched the display, but could not convince the ekrekek's government to capitulate. Kuusamo responded with a magic attack on the capital, killing the ekrekek and forcing the horrified and demoralised Gyongyosians into surrender. Another contributing factor to their ultimate defeat was the simultaneous invasion of Gyongyos by Unkerlant, a move analogous to the 1945 Soviet invasion of Manchuria.

=== Jelgava ===
The equivalent of Spain and Portugal. Jelgava is portrayed as a smaller nation closely akin to Valmiera in language, ethnicity, and culture, and possesses colonies in Siaulia. Jelgava is dominated by an oppressive and reactionary aristocracy, and is ruled by the odious King Donalitu who was replaced by Algarvian King Mezentio's brother when the nation was occupied by Algarve (in this case, based more closely on the Napoleonic Wars than on World War II). Jelgava has a subtropical climate where olives and oranges grow, and is separated from the rest of the continent by a high mountain chain. The capital of Jelgava is Balvi.

=== Kuusamo ===
The equivalent of the United States. It occupies most of the island it shares with Lagoas. Instead of a king, Kuusamo is ruled by seven hereditary princes who share power between each other (roughly equivalent to the US federal structure). The largest city is Yliharma. Its people are East Asian in appearance and are deliberate and low-key in their work, and names in their language are taken from Finnish. While clearly filling the strategic role of the US in WWII, Kuusamo's history and culture are quite different from that of the US. Rather than a new nation created by immigrants, the Kuusamans are proud of their heritage of having been in their land before the Kaunians and the Lagoans came; a chant to this effect is recited as a ceremony before classes and before spells. Also, Kuusamian culture seems far more Scandinavian than American.

Kuusamo was involved in a war with Gyongyos over the possession of islands in the Bothenian Ocean when the Derlavian War started; they stayed neutral until the second year of the war, when Kuusamo declared war against Algarve over the massacre of Kaunians for their life force. The Algarvians retaliated with a magic strike against the capital city, killing two of the Seven Princes and destroying the princely palace in the city. Kuusaman sorcerers succeed in discovering a new method of magical energy release, first using it to counter Algarve's murder-fueled spells, and eventually, a more powerful version of the spell is used to destroy the capital of Gyongyos. Unlike in the historical World War II, the Kuusamans first demonstrate the power of the weapon for Gyongyosian captives (who are then released) but the Gyongyosian government refuses to believe in the demonstration and the spell is used to devastating effect.

=== Lagoas ===
The equivalent of Great Britain, with names drawn from Portuguese. Its capital is Setubal and it is ruled by King Vitor. It and Kuusamo share a large island off of the southeast coast of Derlavai, which is described as being considerably larger than Algarve. Its people are also Algarvic in blood and mannerisms - red-haired and wearing kilts like Algarvians - which is sometimes startling for other members of other peoples who had learned to hate Algarvians. Lagoans are, however, unique in the habit of tying their hair in ponytails - which Algarvians do not, and many of them have noticeable Kuusaman ancestry, including the viewpoint character Fernao. Lagoas joined the war against Algarve when Sibiu was invaded and underwent several air attacks from Algarvian dragons based in Valmiera. Lagoan and Kuusaman forces invaded Derlavai from the east in the fifth year of the war under the command of Kuusaman Grand General Nortano. Lagoas capital, Setubal, is described as being the wealthiest and most cosmopolitan city in the world. This is due in part to Setubal sitting at the confluence of more ley lines than any other city. Setubal has an extensive public transportation network and is described as having many unusually tall buildings.

=== Ortah ===
The equivalent of Switzerland. Isolationist, mountainous, and protected by swamps - its people are generally left alone on the political stage. Ortah is sandwiched between Algarve and Unkerlant. As a result, Ortah is invaded near the end of the war, and ends up an Unkerlanter satellite like Forthweg and Yanina. The people of Ortah are supposed to be related to the Ice People, and their language is similar to theirs, in both cases drawn from Hebrew.

=== Sibiu ===
Equivalent to Denmark, Norway and the Netherlands. It is an island chain nation off of the southern coast of Derlavai. Its people are Algarvic in blood, but it allies against Algarve. Sibiu, a member of the initial coalition, was overrun in a surprise attack by Algarve in the first year of the war, and freed in the third year of the war. It is mentioned that some 300 to 250 years in the past Sibiu fought a series of naval wars with Lagoas, over trade and control of the sea. Sibiu is named after a town in Transylvania. The capital of Sibiu is Tirgoviste. Sibian names are drawn from Romanian.

=== Unkerlant ===
The equivalent to the Soviet Union. It occupies nearly all of the western part of Derlavai. Ethnic Unkerlanters are dark-haired and stocky, clean-shaven, and wear long tunics (the tendency to be clean-shaven being what distinguishes them from the Forthwegians), but Unkerlant is apparently home to ethnic minorities such as the people of the Mamming Hills in the south, who look "more like Kuusamans than anything else." Its people are brutally treated by the paranoid and ruthless King Swemmel, analogous to Joseph Stalin. Swemmel is a hard, suspicious man who is fond of boiling his enemies alive. Swemmel defeated his brother Kyot in the Twinking's War, the equivalent to the Russian Civil War, shortly after the Six Years' War. The capital of Unkerlant is Cottbus. Names in Unkerlant are of German or pseudo-German origin.

=== Valmiera ===
Equivalent to France. It is located on the southeastern section of Derlavai. Its people are descendants of the ancient Kaunian Empire and as such are slim, blonde and blue-eyed and their dress is typically trousers and tunics. Valmiera was one of the states which declared war on Algarve in the first year of the war. The Algarvian offensive in the spring of the second year led to the defeat and occupation of the country. Activities of the Valmieran Resistance under the occupation, seen through the eyes of the character Skarnu, are closely equivalent to the French Resistance in World War II, while the collaboration of most nobles and the Valmieran police with the occupiers resembles the Vichy regime.. However, the corrupt Valmieran aristocracy is reminiscent of a much earlier period in French history, the pre-1789 Ancien Regime. Kuusaian and Lagoan victors give the Valmierans a share in the spoils after the war is over (like the British and Americans to 1945 France). Valmiera's capital is Priekule, describes as a center of high culture.

=== Yanina ===
The equivalent of Italy and Nazi Germany's other allies in general, although, strangely, their names are clearly Greek (e.g. Yanina, Patras). Allied with Algarve in the beginning of the war, its people are most noted for being incompetent militarily, though individual soldiers and dragon flyers sometimes show bravery. Also, Yanina has a colonial possession in the strategic Land of the Ice People, which it is unable to defend against Lagoas, and is being forced to pass effective conduct of the war there into the hands of the Algarvians (equivalent of Italy passing the war in North Africa to the Germans under Erwin Rommel). However, in the last phase of the war, when the Unkerlanter/Soviet army approaches its border and the Yaninan King quickly changes sides. The pom-poms which Yaninans wear on their shoes are the source of constant ridicule by members of other nations. Yaninas are described as being small, swarthy, dark-haired, and big-nosed, somewhat like Unkerlanters but shorter and less stocky. They share with the Algarvians a love for ostentatious mustaches and macho behavior; arguing is semi-humorously considered the national sport. The capital city is Patras.

=== Zuwayza ===
The equivalent of Finland. Located on a peninsula on the far northern part of Derlavai. Due to the hot climate, the people of Zuwayza typically go nude except for jewelry, sandals, and broad-brimmed hats. They are described as very dark-skinned, and Zuwayzin names are taken from Arabic. The Zuwayzi are known to use camels when fighting. Zuwayza was once ruled directly by Unkerlant but gained independence after the Six Years' War. Unkerlant attacked Zuwayza in the first year of the war and gained territory. In retaliation, Zuwayza allied with Algarve against Unkerlant. When Algarve was driven back, Zuwayza was forced to sign a separate peace, allowing Unkerlant great advantages, but preserving its independence. The Zuwayzin capital is Bishah.

=== The Land of the Ice People ===
The equivalent of North Africa located on an icy continent near the south pole. Ice People of both sexes have extensive body hair, on the order of primates. Their language is represented by Hebrew, as in Ortah. Ice People introduce themselves by describing their genealogy into the remote past ending by saying they are related to a god. Magic that works well in Derlavai will not work well in the Land of the Ice People; the Algarvians learned this to their disadvantage when they tried murdering Kaunians there. The Ice People are the only people known to worship gods, instead of spirits.

=== The Duchy of Bari ===
Roughly, the equivalent of the Rhineland or Austria. Once the southern part of Algarve, it was politically separated at the conclusion of the Six-Year war and given independence under Duke Alardo. Algarve's annexation of the region caused Valmiera, Forthweg, Jelgava, and Sibiu to attack, sparking the Derlavaian War.

=== The Duchy of Grelz ===
The equivalent of Ukraine. Located in the southern part of Derlavai. Its people are Unkerlanter but speak with a strong accent. While under Algarvian occupation, it is made into a puppet "Kingdom of Grelz" and is ruled by Mezentio's cousin Raniero. Support for the foreign king is very mixed.

=== The Marquisate of Rivaroli ===
Equivalent of Alsace-Lorraine and the Sudetenland. It is an area long disputed between Algarve and Valmiera, which was incorporated in the latter at the end of the Six Years' War. The people of Rivaroli have an Algarvian allegiance, revolting upon the approach of the Algarvian army in the early part of the war - for which they pay dearly at the war's end, being expelled en masse by the Valmierans.

== Kaunians ==
Kaunians are both equivalents of the Roman Empire and Jews. Kaunians are characterised as on the slender and tall side, with fair skin and blonde hair. Kaunians face suspicion and prejudice, a separate and vaguely detested minority in many nations. Kaunian names (including those in Valmiera and Jelgava) are drawn from the Baltic languages.

Originally most of the continent was covered by the Kaunian Empire. When the Kaunian Empire fell thanks to the "Algarvian Irruption" - analogous to the Germanic invasions of the late Roman Empire - the Kaunians remained the dominant cultural and ethnic group in Eastern Derlavai. First they lived in independent city states and small principalities which later coalesced into the successor-states Jelgava and Valmiera. Jelgavan and Valmieran have developed to the point that their speakers don't understand the classical language unless they study it especially. Ancient Kaunian is a language of many tenses and verb forms, which makes for a language of precision. Kaunians bring this precision into play when they switch to a more modern language, generally to the disdain of others.

In the parts of Lagoas and Kuusamo which were part of the empire, Kaunians disappeared completely. In the more westward parts of the continent, in contrast, Kaunians became an ethnic minority in countries formed by the invading "barbarians": maintaining a distinct and largely separate minority culture, keeping the ancient language in more or less its original form as their daily speech, clinging to the short tunics and trousers common in the days of Empire, and frowning at the idea of mixed marriages. The wearing of trousers by the Kaunian women tends to be a distraction for other peoples, as the tight pants reveal more than the more modern knee-length tunics do. This often results in Kaunian women being regarded as sexually promiscuous - a widespread racial stereotype which is deliberately used by King Mezentio in fomenting hatred of Kaunians.

In Algarve itself, Kaunians seem, already for several generations, to be deeply assimilated in the surrounding society. They speak Algarvian, wear kilts, call themselves by Algarvian names, and their males have Algarvian-style moustaches and behave in the blatant macho way encouraged by Algarvian culture. Until their persecutions started, there were prominent Kaunian scholars at the University of Trapani.

What happens to the Kaunians in the Darkness series is the equivalent to the Holocaust, where Kaunians under Algarvian control are systematically stripped of their rights and violence against them is ignored by the authorities. Eventually, Algarve, facing a desperate stalemate against Unkerlant, begins slaughtering Kaunians en masse to fuel vast quantities of death-energy-powered sorcery in an attempt to break the impasse. Mezentio's official aim is not to exterminate Kaunians but to win the war, thus Kaunians are provided with adequate food to keep them alive until they need to be sacrificed for the war effort. Unkerlant responds to these magical attacks by sacrificing their own people to attack Algarve in the same way.

Many Kaunians do not die without any resistance. The remaining Kaunians in Eoforwic join in the uprising in the city which is the equivalent to the Warsaw Uprising. Other Kaunians use magic to make themselves look like everyone else and are able to hide in plain sight.

Late in the war, as they got desperate, and as it became obvious to the Algarvians that non-Kaunians were now far more of a worry than the thoroughly cowed blonds, the Algarvians began to display a somewhat more pragmatic, open attitude toward the Kaunians. They allowed Valmierans and Jelgavans to join their army, and they played an important role on the southern front against the Unkerlanters and in Jelgava. Their mages still defaulted toward wanting to kill Kaunians out of habit, including the soldiers fighting on their side, but Algarvian officers increasingly refused to allow this, leading the mages to turn to killing Yaninan deserters or turning to other magics.
