= Advance and Retreat =

2002 novel by Harry Turtledove

- First edition
- Author: Harry Turtledove
- Cover artist: Tom Kidd
- Language: English
- Series: War Between the Provinces
- Genre: Fantasy
- Publisher: Baen Books
- Publication date: December 1, 2002
- Publication place: United States
- Media type: Print (Paperback)
- Preceded by: Marching Through Peachtree

Advance and Retreat is the third and final novel in The War Between the Provinces series, a fantasy version of the American Civil War by Harry Turtledove.

== Plot ==
After a long fought out civil war, the Southron forces of the Kingdom of Detina defeat the Northoners and serfdom is abolished throughout all the kingdom.

== Reception ==
Publishers Weekly praised Turtledove's "entertaining and well-drawn characters," "grimly realistic depictions of battlefields and occupied towns", and "beautifully subtle treatment of racism", but noted that the parallels between the Detinan war and the American Civil War result in "a somewhat predictable story".

Steven H Silver observed that these parallels were not exact, in that Turtledove introduced "changes in the events and characters in order to heighten the narrative tension", but considered that the novel could have been "more interesting" if Turtledove had made a greater exploration of how the presence of magic would alter military strategy and tactics.
