= Between the Rivers =

1998 novel by Harry Turtledove

- First edition
- Author: Harry Turtledove
- Cover artist: Gary Ruddell
- Language: English
- Genre: Fantasy
- Publisher: Tor Books
- Publication date: March 1998
- Publication place: United States
- Media type: Print
- Pages: 416 paperback
- ISBN: 0-8125-4520-6

Between the Rivers is a fantasy novel by Harry Turtledove. The book centers on a fantasy realm, analogous to ancient Mesopotamia, that is based on the myths and legends of Sumer and Babylon.

== Plot introduction ==
In the novel, the cities and regions are each ruled by their own gods. In the city of Gibil, however, the god Engibil has gotten lazy and does not monitor his city. Consequently the inhabitants have developed technology such as writing and smelting, and have started to lose respect for Engibil and his power. The other gods have gotten angry at Gibil for reasons they keep to themselves, and have started to refuse to trade with Gibil. It becomes the task of the main character, Sharur, a merchant, to travel the land, find out why the gods are angry, and try to solve the problem.

== Reviews ==
The book received a modestly favorable reception. One reviewer called it "an enjoyable way to pass a sunny weekend afternoon." Another states "Between the Rivers covers ground familiar to readers of Turtledove's work, however it does so in a manner which is frequently fresh and inventive."
