= Opening of the World =

Novel trilogy by Harry Turtledove

- Beyond the Gap (2007); The Breath of God (2008); The Golden Shrine (2009)
- Author: Harry Turtledove
- Country: United States
- Language: English
- Genre: Fantasy
- Published: 2007–2009
- Media type: Print (hardback & paperback)

The Opening of the World series is a trilogy of novels by Harry Turtledove set in a fantasy world.

In the trilogy, the Raumsdalian Empire is the dominant political entity, which shares ties to a loose collection of barbarian tribes with a common ethnicity, known as the Bizogots. The known world had always been bounded on the north by a massive glacier, but it melted through at the beginning of the series, allowing contact with lands to the north. The series details the exploration of these northern lands and combat with the people who live there, an aggressive race of fierce warriors and powerful sorcerers known as the Rulers.

== List of novels ==
- Beyond the Gap (2007)
- The Breath of God (2008)
- The Golden Shrine (2009)
