= Marching Through Peachtree =

2001 novel by Harry Turtledove

- First edition
- Author: Harry Turtledove
- Illustrator: David Mattingly
- Language: English
- Series: War Between the Provinces
- Genre: Fantasy
- Publisher: Baen Books
- Publication date: November 1, 2001
- Publication place: United States
- Media type: Print (Paperback)
- Preceded by: Sentry Peak
- Followed by: Advance and Retreat

Marching Through Peachtree is the second novel in The War Between the Provinces series, a fantasy version of the American Civil War by Harry Turtledove.

== Plot ==
A civil war is tearing apart the kingdom of Detina. When Avram became the new King of Detina, he announced his intent to abolish serfdom for the blond serfs upon which the northern provinces depended, Detina was torn in two, and the rebellious north took Avram's cousin, Grand Duke Geoffrey, as their king.

Neither side could expect an easy victory. While the south was larger and wealthier, the north had better soldiers and more powerful wizards. Led by officers riding unicorns, supplied by flying carpets, both sides clash for three years when Count Thraxton, a conceited wizard-general whose opinions of his spell-casting ability far outstripped the reality, bungled a spell which backfired disastrously against his own side, giving the Unionists a decisive victory.

But the war was far from over: Thraxton is relieved of his command; which means that the south faces a far more competent general: Joseph the Gamecock. And Joseph and his troops were determined to hold Peachtree Province against the loyalist troops. They had occupied Rockface Rise, which offered only two narrow places where the Unionists could come at them, and had further fortified it with trenches and catapults. When the southern army attacked, they would face formidable obstacles both natural and manmade, as well as the repeating crossbows of the troops and the deadly sorcerous storm and lightning wielded by the northern wizards.

== Reception ==
CNN considered the novel to have "very little in the way of new insights about the War Between the States", "prose [that] is functional at best [and] logy at worst", and "four hundred pages of puns", concluding that although Turtledove "probably had a blast" writing the novel, it is not "fun to read". James Nicoll called it "dismal".

Steven H Silver found that the puns and wordplay "enlivened" what was otherwise "a pretty straight-forward retelling of a major campaign in the Civil War", and observed that it "suffers from following history a little too closely" and does not sufficiently explore the effects of the presence of magic; ultimately, Silver concluded that although the book is an improvement over Sentry Peak (to which it is a sequel), and has "quality" writing, it nonetheless "fails to live up to its potential."
