= Justinian (novel) =

1998 novel by Harry Turtledove

- Author: H. N. Turteltaub
- Language: English
- Genre: Historical novel
- Publisher: TOR
- Publication date: 1998
- Publication place: United States
- Media type: Print (hardback & paperback)
- ISBN: 0-8125-4527-3 (paperback edition)

Justinian (ISBN 0-8125-4527-3), was published in 1998 by Tor Books. It is a novel by American writer Harry Turtledove writing under the pseudonym H. N. Turteltaub, a name he used for a time when writing historical fiction.

== Plot summary ==
The book is in the format of a fictional memoir written by Byzantine Emperor Justinian II, with brief interludes from a soldier named Myakes, who was close to Justinian throughout much of the emperor's life. The book follows Justinian's time before and after taking the throne, as well as his overthrow, mutilation and exile in the Crimea, his subsequent return to power (following a possibly apocryphal nose-job), his insane quest for revenge, and his finally being unseated a second time and executed. Myakes, who had been blinded and exiled to a monastery after Justinian's final defeat, listens as a fellow monk named Brother Elpidios reads the memoir out loud, and occasionally interrupts with commentary or criticism. In the end, Elipidos, who had been contemplating writing his own history, hides the book as he believes he could not properly separate the good from the evil in Justinian's life.

== Historical accuracy ==
In an author's note, Turtledove, who has a doctorate in Byzantine history, discusses the historical accuracy of the books. He notes that the reconstructive surgery which he describes Justinian undergoing is one which Indian surgeons were actually performing at the time and is one speculation about how the exiled emperor may have restored his nose. He says that most of the departures from the historical record were done for dramatic purposes, such as the creation of Myakes as a companion and sounding board for Justinian, and changes to the religious debates of the time, which Turtledove believed would appear hopelessly obscurantist to most modern readers.

== Major themes ==
The central theme of the book seems to be "power corrupts, and absolute power corrupts absolutely", but this is not necessarily the case. Justinian is a man who believes he can do no wrong. After all, he is on the throne because God wants him to be there. If he is acting in the name of God, how can he be doing evil?

Another central theme of the book is the importance of religion in the 8th century. Justinian's father is shown convening a synod, and both Justinian and his father lead battles against the newly arisen Muslim faith. The Popes, who are considered by many in Constantinople to be merely the Bishop of Rome, are shown as not having as much influence then as they would have in later centuries.

== Reception ==
In a mixed review, Jane Baird of Library Journal wrote, "In spite of lengthy and tedious descriptions of military campaigns and an underpopulated cast of characters, the reader is drawn into a Byzantine world where the glory of God and the glory of earthly power are two sides of a glittering gold coin." The Washington Post reviewer Brian Jacomb said the book was "action-packed, with many battle scenes and much palace intrigue" and called it an "evocative novel" that "commands the reader's attention".

In a positive review, Booklist's Margaret Flanagan wrote, "An artfully styled narrative and painstaking attention to historical detail vivify this mesmerizing fictional account". Publishers Weekly also praised the novel, stating, the author's "rich blend of fact and fiction brings the tyrant to life as a man obsessed with imperial power".
