= Atlantis (series) =

Novel series by Harry Turtledove

- Opening Atlantis (2007); The United States of Atlantis (2008); Liberating Atlantis (2009); Atlantis and Other Places (2010)
- Author: Harry Turtledove
- Country: United States
- Language: English
- Genre: Alternate history
- Publisher: Roc Books
- Published: 2005–2010

Atlantis is an alternate history series written by Harry Turtledove. The point of divergence occurs around 85 million years ago when the eastern portion of the North American continent splits off from the rest of the continent and forms Atlantis, a separate continent farther east in the Atlantic Ocean.

== Novels and stories ==
- Opening Atlantis (2007)
- The United States of Atlantis (2008)
- Liberating Atlantis (2009)

In addition to the three novels, two short stories Audubon in Atlantis (2005) and The Scarlet Band (2006) were written prior to the novels and they would later be reprinted in Turtledove's short story collection Atlantis and Other Places (2010).

== Series premise ==
The point of divergence from our timeline occurs around 85 million years ago when the eastern portion of the North American continent (roughly consisting of the present day Eastern Coast of the United States, extreme Southern Canada, Cuba and Hispaniola, Jamaica, Puerto Rico and various smaller Caribbean islands) splits off from the rest of the continent and forms Atlantis, a separate continent farther east in the Atlantic Ocean.

History remained more or less the same as in real life until around 1452, when Atlantis is visited for the first known time by humans. The first known people to arrive on Atlantis are Breton fisherman François Kersauzon and his crew of the Morzen (Breton for Mermaid). He promises a fellow fisherman, Englishman Edward Radcliffe, to guide him to the location in exchange for a third of his load of cod that year. Radcliffe agreed to the deal and eventually returned with his family and a few others to create a settlement, New Hastings (set in real-world Connecticut). Soon afterwards, Kersauzon founded his own city, Cosquer (set around real-life Virginia), and Basque fishermen erected their own town of Gernika (set in real-life Georgia) in the south. These settlements in turn gave birth to, and were ultimately eclipsed by, substantial English, French, and Spanish colonial holdings on the island.

The descendants of Edward Radcliffe played major roles throughout the history of Atlantis. While the Kersauzon family continued to have an important place in Atlantean society, it was much less prominent than the Radcliffe and Radcliff family (one branch dropped the e from the name).

In the early years of settlement, Edward Radcliffe's son Henry became the first person to navigate the west coast of Atlantis, while Henry's brother Richard routinely crossed over the Green Ridge Mountains on foot.

In 1470, King Edward IV banished Richard Neville, the Earl of Warwick to Atlantis. The Earl attempted to institute himself as Lord of New Hastings. Resistance on the part of Richard Radcliffe led to the death of his father Edward Radcliffe. The Radcliffe sons gathered enough support to defeat and kill Warwick at the Battle of the Strand. This was the first instance of rebellion in Atlantis.

By the 1660s, Avalon (set near real-life Buffalo, New York) had become the home of a number of pirates, the most notorious of these being Red Rodney Radcliffe. He and his pirate crew on the Black Hand launched attacks on Spanish and Dutch colonies in Terranova (the name of the rest of North and South America) and English Atlantis. To protect shipping lines across the Hesperian Gulf from danger, England and Holland pooled their resources and worked together. Under the leadership of William Radcliff (the second cousin to the pirate), the Avalon pirates were thoroughly defeated.

In 1761, the Seven Years' War in Europe had spread to Atlantis, with British Atlantis (formerly English Atlantis) going to war with French and Spanish Atlantis. The fighting on the Atlantis Front was ultimately brief when compared with other fronts, though when it was done, French Atlantis was no more and was absorbed into British Atlantis.

Victor Radcliff was the highest ranking Atlantean on the British side. Thanks to his decisive actions, British commander, Charles Cornwallis was able to decisively defeat French general Louis-Joseph de Montcalm (who was killed in action in 1761) and French Atlantean commander Roland Kersauzon.

The victory in the war had long term consequences. The financial cost of the victory was quite high for the Kingdom of Great Britain, and it sought to recoup that loss by taxing its Atlantean subjects. Moreover, French Atlantis had relied heavily on chattel slavery, and its perpetuation was crucial in keeping French subjects placated, particularly as British settlers made their way south after the war.

By 1775, the Atlanteans were fed up with British taxation, and with that, the Atlantean War of Independence began. The war lasted three years and ended in 1778. With Victor Radcliff in command, and with the eventual aid of France, Atlantis secured its independence as the United States of Atlantis. Upon its independence, the United States of Atlantis adopted a republican government based on the Roman Republic.

Despite securing a peace with the British, the United States of Atlantis came to blows with them again in 1809 after Atlantis provided aid to rebellions in Terranova. The War of 1809 ended as a draw between Atlantis and the United Kingdom, although arguably Atlantis received a substantial defeat at several points.

The ideals of the War for Independence did not translate into an end of slavery. Slavery was deemed too important in what used to be French Atlantis to be meddled with. It even expanded, when Atlantis purchased Gernika, Spain's mainland Atlantean possession.

Atlantis produced great authors such as Nathaniel Hawthorne and Ambrose Bierce. In 1843, Terranovan ornithologists John James Audubon and Edward Harris visited Atlantis and wrote a respected treatise of birds which they observed.

Enslaved African Atlanteans and Copperskin Terranovans continued to seek their freedom, through various uprisings they started were quickly crushed. Finally, in 1852, under the leadership of Frederick Radcliff, the illegitimate grandson of Victor Radcliff, Atlantis saw an insurrection so vast and so well organized that it could not be put down without the whole country paying a too expensive price in blood and treasure. The insurrection forced the Atlantean Senate to abolish slavery once and for all.

The remainder of the 19th century was relatively calm in Atlantis. From its very beginning, Atlantis paid lip-service to egalitarianism. Thus, people from all over the world immigrated to Atlantis. It also placed emphasis on religious toleration. Consequently, a new Atlantean form of Christianity appeared in the early 19th Century called the House of Universal Devotion. Its founder, Samuel Jones, held that God lived in all people, and that, if we simply lived the proper lifestyle, we might overcome our limitations and become divine. The House was vocally anti-slavery well before the Great Insurrection. In the 1880s, a cabal of the Atlantean establishment, disgusted with how quickly the House had grown, attempted to implicate Jones in the murder of several critics. When the plot was unraveled by British consulting detective Athelstan Helms, Atlantean society grew concerned that the House was now insulated from criticism.
