= Otto Witte =

German fantasist (1872–1958)

Otto Witte (October 16, 1872 – August 13, 1958) was a German circus acrobat and fantasist who said that he managed to be crowned King of Albania.

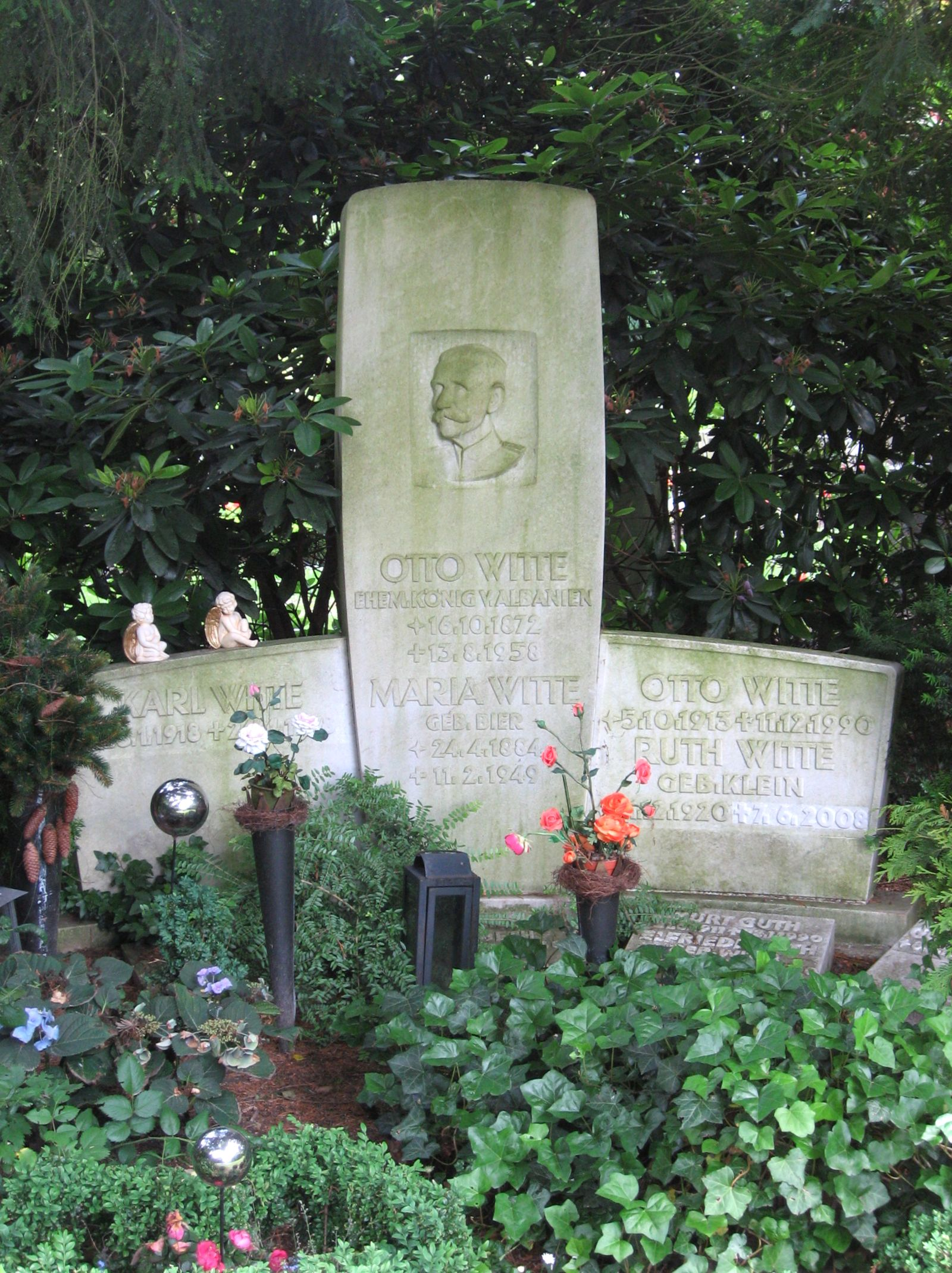
Otto Witte's grave in Ohlsdorf Cemetery, Hamburg

In 1913, when Albania broke away from the Ottoman Empire, some Albanian Muslims invited Halim Eddine, a nephew of the Sultan, to come and be crowned king. Noticing his own resemblance to Halim Eddine, Witte said, he traveled to Durrës with a friend, the sword-swallower Max Schlepsig. He claimed that he had succeeded in being crowned king by the local troops on 13 August 1913. He also claimed that, over the next five days, he enjoyed a harem and declared war on Montenegro before his ruse was discovered. His claims also include that he took a substantial portion of the kingdom's treasury, and along with Schlepsig he managed to escape the palace with the aid of the harem, and eventually made their way out of the country.

Most parts of his story were found to be impossible. There was no Halim Eddine and the Sultan Abdul Hamid II's son Burhan Eddine, who was offered the throne in 1914, never came; he may be the model for this story. Originally he claimed this escapade happened in February 1913, when Albania was still under Serbian occupation, so he changed the date to August 1913. There is no local evidence to support his claims. Nevertheless, he became famous in Germany for his public appearance. The Berlin police later allowed his official identity card to bear the artistic pseudonym ehemaliger König von Albanien ("former King of Albania"). For the rest of his life he insisted on being greeted with that title, and it was put on his tombstone at Ohlsdorf Cemetery, Hamburg (Parzelle Q 9, 430–433).

He may have suffered from pseudologia fantastica; for example, he claimed to have founded a political party. He said he was a candidate for the German presidency in 1925, gaining 25,000 to 230,000 votes in the first round but resigning in favour of Paul von Hindenburg. The voting records do not support this either.

Interest in Albania was high in the German-speaking world because the Great Powers had chosen a German prince to sit on the throne. William of Wied was offered the throne in 1913 and reigned for six months in 1914. The similarity in name between Wied and Witte may have inspired Witte to make up the story.

== Adaptations ==
Otto Witte's story was adapted by Harry Turtledove for his novel Every Inch a King (2005), which puts it in a high fantasy setting. Witte's story bears a strong resemblance to the best-selling adventure novel The Prisoner of Zenda (1894), of which the first film adaptation was released in 1913. The central concept of Zenda is a commoner being mistaken for a king, and assuming his place. (Another example is Rudyard Kipling's "The Man Who Would Be King," which is arguably a closer match to Witte's story.)

Another adaption of Otto Witte's story is in the 2012 novel "If you're reading this I'm already dead" by Andrew Nicoll.

Various newspapers and magazines took Otto's story as fact and repeated it, including Time magazine, which published an article about his tale in 1958.

== See also ==
- Wilhelm Voigt, a German impostor who disguised as a Prussian military officer
