= Uncle Alf =

- Short story by Harry Turtledove
- Country: United States
- Language: English
- Genre: Alternate history

Publication
- Published in: Alternate Generals II and Atlantis and Other Places
- Publication type: Print and online
- Publisher: Baen Books
- Publication date: 2002

"Uncle Alf" (2002) is an alternate history short story by Harry Turtledove. It was first published in Turtledove's edited anthology Alternate Generals II in 2002 and was later reprinted in his short story collection Atlantis and Other Places in 2010.

== Plot ==
The point of divergence occurs in 1913 when Alfred von Schlieffen, who in real life died in 1913, survives to personally oversee the successful implementation of his famous plan for two-front war against France and Russia. Germany wins the Great War in 1914 after only a few months, and fully occupies both France and Belgium while the United Kingdom and Russia back out of the war completely. Two years later in 1916, an earlier communist revolution erupts in Russia, Kaiser Wilhelm II (fearing the consequences within his country's own borders if the Russian Empire collapsed) helps his cousin and former enemy Tsar Nicholas II to crush it quickly.

The main action of the story itself is set in May 1929, as sergeant Adolf Hitler of the Feldgendarmerie is sent to Lille in pursuit of communist agitator Jacques Doriot. The story is a series of letters from "Uncle Alf" to his niece/lover, Geli Raubal. In these letters, he expresses his frustration with the complacency of the local German officials; his disgust with the "degraded" French; his utter devotion to the German Empire, and; his unrestrained (and incestrial) passion for his beloved Geli.

== See also ==
- Curious Notions (second volume of the Crosstime Traffic series), a novel also written by Turtledove with a similar point of divergence.
