= War Between the Provinces =

Fantasy novel series

- Sentry Peak (2000); Marching Through Peachtree (2001); Advance and Retreat (2002)
- Author: Harry Turtledove
- Country: United States
- Language: English
- Genre: Fantasy
- Publisher: Baen
- Published: 2000–2002
- Media type: Print (hardback & paperback)

The War Between the Provinces is a series of fantasy novels by Harry Turtledove.

The novels are a retelling of the American Civil War in a high fantasy setting called the Kingdom of Detina. The series focuses on the Eastern theater of the War Between the Provinces.

The names of locations have been changed, and North and South (and west and east) have been reversed, and, rather than skin color, hair color is used as the basis for the dehumanization. Many of the characters are based on real-world characters, and their names indicate this. Often their names are anagrams of the real-world character they are based on, or their nicknames contain their original's name. Hand-cranked crossbows replace guns to mirror slow reloading times, and the northern rebels have fewer flying carpet paths (railroads) than the southern kingdom, hence giving the slave-owning side the same logistical problems that existed in the American Civil War.

== Some characters with historical counterparts ==
=== Southern Detinan characters ===
- King Avram – counterpart of US President Abraham Lincoln
- General (later Marshal) Bart – counterpart of General Ulysses S. Grant
- General Hesmucet – counterpart of General William Tecumseh Sherman
- General "Doubting" George – counterpart of General George Henry Thomas
- General Guildenstern – counterpart of General William Rosecrans
- General Fighting Joseph – counterpart of General Joseph "Fighting Joe" Hooker
- General John the Hierophant – counterpart of General John Pope
- General Whiskery Ambrose – counterpart of General Ambrose Burnside
- General James the Bird's Eye – counterpart of James Birdseye McPherson
- Mage Alva – counterpart of Thomas Edison

=== Northern Detinan characters ===
- King Geoffrey – counterpart of Confederate President Jefferson Davis
- Duke Edward of Arlington – counterpart of General Robert E. Lee
- Thomas the Brick Wall – counterpart of General Thomas "Stonewall" Jackson
- Count Thraxton (the Braggart) – counterpart of General Braxton Bragg
- Marquis Peegeetee of Goodlook – counterpart of General P. G. T. Beauregard
- Ned of the Forest – counterpart of Nathan Bedford Forest
- Joseph the Gamecock – counterpart of Joseph E. Johnston
- Lt. Gen Bell – counterpart of John Bell Hood
- James of Broadpath – counterpart of James Longstreet
- Richard the Haberdasher – counterpart of Richard Taylor
- Roast Beef William – counterpart of William Hardee
- Provincial Prerogative – counterpart of States Rights Gist
- John of Barsoom – counterpart of General John C. Carter
- Leonidas the Priest – counterpart of Confederate general and Episcopalian bishop Leonidas Polk
- Dan of Rabbit Hill – counterpart of Confederate general D.H. Hill
- Early the Jubilant, aka Jubal the Late - counterpart of Jubal Early

=== Mentioned Detinan characters ===
- King Buchan – The previous King of Detina before his death. He was the father of Avram and uncle of Geoffrey. He is based on US President James Buchanan.
- Daniel the Weaver – A Detinan statesman. Ten years before the Detinan Civil War, he worked with Henry Feet of Clay and John the Typhoon to reach a compromise that headed off a war over serfdom by satisfying both northern nobles and King Zachary the Rough and Ready. He is based on Daniel Webster.
- Henry Feet of Clay – A Detinan statesman who is based on Henry Clay.
- John the Typhoon – A Detinan statesman who is based on John C. Calhoun.
- Zachary the Rough and Ready – The King of Detina ten years before the Detinan Civil War. He is based on US President Zachary Taylor.
- Hesmucet – He was a blond king who led a war against the ethnic Detinans before they had become firmly established as the rulers of the continent. Hesmucet frustrated the expansionist intentions of the Detinans for a long time but was killed in battle. He is based on Shawnee chief Tecumseh, who fought the United States during the War of 1812.
- "Inward" – He was the alias of a mage from the Mother Kingdom who anonymously wrote a theory that the gods created lower creatures than humans and other modern animals and let them vie for supremacy of the physical universe without intervening on behalf of early man or anyone else. The notion was condemned as heretical by most mages, and many threats were made against "Inward", which is why he went to great lengths to keep his identity a secret. He is based on British naturalist Charles Darwin.
- Kermit – He was an emperor on the continent across the Western Ocean from Detina. 50 years before the Detinan Civil War, Kermit waged a war against the other western kingdoms to expand his empire. His efforts were met with tremendous initial success, and he established a reputation as one of the world's all-time great military geniuses. However, he attempted to invade the massive southern kingdom of Sorb during the brutal winter months. Although Kermit's forces were able to make it to the Sorbian capital of Pahzbull, his army was forced to retreat from the city and it would never recover from the massive number of casualties that it sustained from the retreat. More men were lost to starvation and the winter temperatures than to Sorbian and allied counteroffensives. Kermit is based on French Emperor Napoleon.

=== Detinan gods ===
- Death Lord – The Detinan god of death
- Lion God – One of the two greatest in the Detinan pantheon
- Red Lady – The goddess of the Native Detinan blonds
- Thunderer – One of the two greatest in the Detinan pantheon
- Sweet One – The Detinan goddess of love and sexuality.
- Hunt Lady - The Detinan goddess of the hunt.

== Nations and regions ==
- Southern Detina – based on the United States (Union)
- Northern Detina – based on the Confederate States
- The Mother Kingdom – based on the United Kingdom
- The Sapphire Isle – based on Ireland, occupied by the Mother Kingdom
- An unnamed empire based on France, which fought an analog of the Napoleonic Wars some 50 years before the story setting.
- Sorb – based on Russia

=== Detinan Provinces ===
- Baha Province/Golden Province - based on the US state of California
- Cloviston Province - based on the US state of Kentucky
- Croatoan Province - based on the US state of North Carolina
- Dothan Province - based on the US state of Alabama
- East Parthenia - based on the US state of West Virginia
- Franklin Province - based on the US state of Tennessee
- Great River Province - based on the US state of Mississippi
- Highlow Province - based on the US state of Ohio
- New Eborac Province - based on the US state of New York
- Palmetto Province - based on the US state of South Carolina
- Parthenia Province - based on the US state of Virginia
- Peachtree Province - based on the US state of Georgia
- Peterpaulandia Province - based on the US state of Maryland
- ShowMe Province - based on the US state of Missouri

=== Detinan Cities ===
- Annasville - based on West Point, New York and Annapolis, Maryland
- Camphorville, Great River - based on Vicksburg, Mississippi
- Essoville - based on Gettysburg, Pennsylvania
- Georgetown, Detina - capital city of Detina, based on Washington, D.C.
- Hayek, Dothan - based on Selma, Alabama
- Karlsburg, Palmetto - based on Charleston, South Carolina
- Lemon's Justiciary, Parthenia - based on Orange, Virginia
- Luxor, Franklin - based on Memphis, Tennessee
- Marthasville, Peachtree - based on Atlanta, Georgia
- New Eborac City - largest city in the Province of New Eborac and Detina, based on New York City
- Nonesuch, Parthenia - based on Richmond, Virginia
- Old Capet - based on New Orleans, Louisiana
- Pierreville, Parthenia - based on Petersburg, Virginia
- Ramblerton, Franklin - based on Nashville, Tennessee
- Viziersville, Parthenia - based on Chancellorsville, Virginia
- Warsaw, Franklin
- Whiteside, Franklin

== Novels ==
- Sentry Peak (2000)
- Marching Through Peachtree (2001)
- Advance and Retreat (2002)
