= Beyond the Gap =

2007 novel by Harry Turtledove

- Author: Harry Turtledove
- Cover artist: Justin Sweet
- Language: English
- Series: The Opening of the World
- Genre: Fantasy, Alternate History
- Publisher: Tor Books
- Publication date: February 2007
- Publication place: United States
- Media type: Hardcover, Paperback, Audible
- Pages: 336 Hardcover
- ISBN: 0765317109
- Followed by: The Breath of God

Beyond the Gap is a fantasy novel by Harry Turtledove, published in February 2007. It is the first book of the Opening of the World series. The book centers on several citizens of the fictional Bronze Age Empire of Raumsdalia. Raumsdalia is situated south of a great steppeland which is bordered on the north by a vast, seemingly unending glacier.

== Plot summary ==
When a gap opens in the glacier, Count Hamnet Thyssen and Ulric Skakki are dispatched by Emperor Sighvat II of Raumsdalia to explore the other side. Together with Earl Eyvind Torfin and a wizard, Audun Gilli, they team up with Trasamund, a chieftain of the nomadic, mammoth-herding Bizogot nation. Crossing through the gap, the explorers discover that a powerful tribal confederation, who call themselves "the Rulers," are preparing to burst through the gap and seize the lands to the south for their own.
