= The War That Came Early =

Book series by Harry Turtledove

- Hitler's War (2009); West and East (2010); The Big Switch (2011); Coup d'Etat (2012); Two Fronts (2013); Last Orders (2014)
- Author: Harry Turtledove
- Country: United States
- Language: English
- Genre: Alternate history
- Published: 2009–2014
- Media type: Print (hardback & paperback)

The War That Came Early is a six-novel series by Harry Turtledove depicting an alternate history of World War II. As is typical of Turtledove's alternate histories, the narrative follows a large cast of both fictional and historical characters.

== Points of divergence ==
The series's initial point of divergence occurs when Spanish Nationalist leader José Sanjurjo avoids the plane crash that took his life in reality. While Sanjurjo's rule starts on a similar path to that of Francisco Franco, he later aligns Spain with the Axis powers and occupies Gibraltar (which Franco carefully avoided doing in actual history).

A second divergence occurs when British and French appeasement at the Munich Conference leads Adolf Hitler to decide that he should attack while his opponents are unprepared; he gets his casus belli when Konrad Henlein is assassinated by a fictional Czech nationalist. As a result, World War II starts in 1938 with a German invasion of Czechoslovakia rather than Poland, still drawing in Britain and France through treaty obligations, with both sides far less prepared for war than they were in 1939.

== Hitler's War ==
Hitler's War
- Author: Harry Turtledove
- Language: English
- Genre: Alternate history
- Publisher: Del Rey Books
- Publication date: August 4, 2009
- Publication place: United States
- Media type: Print (Hardcover & Paperback)
- Pages: 512
- ISBN: 978-0-345-49182-4

The first book in the series covers autumn 1938 to spring 1939.

After an initial tenacious resistance to the German army, subsequent Polish and Hungarian invasions combined with a Slovak rebellion lead to Czechoslovakia's collapse. In the Spanish Civil War, Sanjurjo's decision to seize Gibraltar from Britain ties the Nationalist Spaniards to the Axis side. France starts offering some aid to the hard-pressed Spanish Republicans who were on the verge of collapse, in addition to the meager aid they got from the Soviet Union –just enough to keep them going, but not to gain victory. The Spanish Civil War thus settles into a stalemate as both sides' foreign allies turn their attention to the larger war.

When the anticommunist Polish government also decides to side with Germany, war erupts with the USSR; there is no Nazi-Soviet Pact. Both the Germans and the Soviets immediately find themselves fighting two-front wars as the Soviets attack west and the Japanese invade Siberia (there are no Battles of Khalkhin Gol). Consequentially Germany launches the Manstein Plan, its own westward offensive to knock France out of the war. The German forces are not as overwhelming as they would have been with another year of preparation, and some are also still tied down on the Eastern Front. Moreover, in this history the Skoda factory was destroyed during the fierce Czech resistance, rather than falling intact into German hands and starting to produce high-quality tanks for them. The final result is that the German Blitzkrieg is not as devastating as it would be in 1940, the British and French armies are able to hold the line outside Paris, and there is no Fall of France – which makes for a strategically different war from the World War II we know, not least because there is no Battle of Britain or Attack on Pearl Harbor.

Discontent grows within the German army as the Western Front is threatened and has achieved little strategically, whilst dissatisfaction with Hitler's rash decision in starting the war in the first place leads to a purge of the officer corps. At home, although no Kristallnacht occurs, discrimination and persecution against German Jews continues to grow.

== West and East ==
West and East
- Author: Harry Turtledove
- Language: English
- Genre: Alternate history
- Publisher: Del Rey Books
- Publication date: July 27, 2010
- Publication place: United States
- Media type: Print (Hardcover)
- Pages: 448
- ISBN: 978-0-345-49184-8

The second book focuses on the stalemates that have developed all across Europe. In the Russian Far East, the Japanese are able to sever the Trans-Siberian Railway, but cold weather, mosquitoes, and bloody assaults cause high casualties on both sides. Tension mounts between American forces stationed in China and the Japanese Army. Germany is able to gain ground in Scandinavia and introduces the new Panzer III tank, but the British, the French and the Soviets are able to mount major offensives that push toward the German border.

== The Big Switch ==
The Big Switch
- Author: Harry Turtledove
- Language: English
- Genre: Alternate history
- Publisher: Del Rey Books
- Publication date: July 19, 2011
- Publication place: United States
- Media type: Print (Hardcover)
- Pages: 480
- ISBN: 978-0-345-49186-2

The third book's title refers to Britain and France joining Germany's side against the Soviet Union. After War Minister Winston Churchill dies in a car accident (widely suspected to be a cover for an assassination), Rudolf Hess is able to convince the two allies to send their armies into the Soviet Union. Prime Minister Neville Chamberlain steps down in favor of Horace Wilson, whose rule becomes increasingly authoritarian. The German Army withdraws from France; the Czechoslovak exiles, betrayed by the Allies, retreat to Republican Spain, while the United States abandons its Lend Lease support for Britain and France. Soviet forces retreat into their own territory as the winter starts. Jews in the conquered lands are harshly oppressed, although those in Poland are exempt as their country is an ally of Germany - there is no Holocaust. Japan finally takes Vladivostok and makes peace with the USSR. The United States enacts an embargo against Japan; in response, Japan attacks British, French, Dutch, and American targets across the Pacific on January 12, 1941.

== Coup d'État ==
Coup d'Etat
- Author: Harry Turtledove
- Language: English
- Genre: Alternate history
- Publisher: Del Rey Books
- Publication date: July 31, 2012
- Publication place: United States
- Media type: Print (Hardcover)
- Pages: 432
- ISBN: 978-0-345-52465-2

The fourth book covers a military coup in Britain, led by General Archibald Wavell with the blessing of King George VI, that turns the country away from their alliance with the Nazis, followed by the French (who did not need a change of government to do so). The Japanese gain ground throughout the Pacific and southeast Asia and bloody the American Pacific Fleet through air attacks, forcing them to retreat to Pearl Harbor; the Americans learn the hard way that the age of big surface warships is over and that with the advent of air power the only warships which count are the aircraft carriers -in which the US Navy is woefully deficient in both numbers and training.

== Two Fronts ==
Two Fronts
- Author: Harry Turtledove
- Language: English
- Genre: Alternate history
- Publisher: Del Rey Books
- Publication date: July 23, 2013
- Publication place: United States
- Media type: Print (Hardcover)
- ISBN: 978-0345524683

The fifth book spans from 1942 to early 1943. Having once again switched sides, the British and French have reopened the Western Front and are also fighting the Germans and Italians in North Africa. Because of the shift in German resources, the Red Army is finally able to break through and liberate Belarus and Ukraine near the end of the book. In the Pacific theater, Japan attempts a biological attack on Hawaii. President Franklin D. Roosevelt cuts government funding for the Manhattan Project.

== Last Orders ==
Last Orders
- Author: Harry Turtledove
- Language: English
- Genre: Alternate history
- Publisher: Del Rey Books
- Publication date: July 15, 2014
- Publication place: United States
- Media type: Print (Hardcover)
- ISBN: 978-0345524713

The last book takes place from late 1943 to 1944. After a coup in Germany takes Hitler's life, a new non-Nazi military dictatorship led by General Heinz Guderian negotiates an end to the European war; the Allies allow Germany to retain Czechoslovakia and the Soviet Union to retain the Baltic states. With the Soviets remaining on the eastern margins of Europe and no American forces present in Europe at all, Germany remains the dominant military power of Europe, and unlike the interwar period, no limitations are placed on its armaments. The military government restores all rights of citizenship to Germany's Jews, and nips the proto-Holocaust in the bud. Since the US abandoned its own nuclear program, Professor Albert Einstein is worried that Germany - no longer Nazi but still nationalist and militaristic - might be the first to gain nuclear arms. Britain is also under military rule, while Spain is united under the Republicans. The war against Japan is not over, however, and Stalin moves troops to the Far East while concluding an alliance with the United States.
