= Earthgrip =

1991 collection of linked science fiction stories by Harry Turtledove

- Cover of first paperback edition
- Author: Harry Turtledove
- Cover artist: Barclay Shaw
- Language: English
- Genre: Science fiction short stories
- Publisher: The Easton Press
- Publication date: December 1991
- Publication place: United States
- Media type: Print (hardcover)
- Pages: 264 pp
- ISBN: 0-345-37239-5 (pbk.)

Earthgrip is a collection of linked science fiction stories by Harry Turtledove, first published in hardcover by The Easton Press in 1991, and paperback by Ballantine Books in December of the same year. The cover of the paperback edition bears the subtitled "Tales from the Traders' World." It was later gathered together with his novel Noninterference and collection Kaleidoscope into the omnibus collection 3 X T, published in hardcover by Baen Books in 2004.

The book contains two novellas and one novelette.

== Contents ==
- "The G'Bur" (originally published as "6 +" in Analog Science Fiction and Fact, September 1987)
- "The Atheters (originally published as "Nothing in the Night-Time" in Analog Science Fiction and Fact, March 1989)
- "The Foitani (originally published in serial form as "The Great Unknown" in Analog Science Fiction and Fact, April–June 1991)
