= Every Inch a King =

2005 novel by Harry Turtledove

- Author: Harry Turtledove
- Cover artist: Bob Eggleton
- Language: English
- Genre: Fantasy
- Publication date: November 11, 2005
- Publication place: United States
- Media type: Print (hardcover & paperback)
- Pages: 314 pp.
- ISBN: 0-9759156-1-4

Every Inch a King is a 2005 fantasy novel by Harry Turtledove, published by ISFiC Press. It is a fictional account of the story of Otto Witte, who allegedly spent five days pretending to be the King of Albania. The title is a quotation from Shakespeare's King Lear, Act IV scene 6, wherein the insane King, crowned with weeds, makes futile assertions of his now usurped power.

== Plot ==
The book centers around Otto of Schlepsig, a circus performer and tightrope walker, who is surprised to learn that he's an almost dead-ringer for Prince Halim Eddin, recently invited to become king the newly independent country of Shqiperi. Fed up with his life in the circus, Otto, and his friend, the sword swallower Max of Witte, get some uniforms and set out to take the Prince's place as King of Shqiperi.

== Setting ==
The book takes place in a fictional version of the Balkans, between the First Balkan War and the Second Balkan War. All the countries mentioned there have real world analogues (i.e.: Hassocki Empire = Ottoman Empire, Lokris = Greece, Shqiperi = Albania). Magic is predominant in the land and fills the same roles technology does in our world. It is also worth noting that the names given to the analogous countries all have some basis in reality. For instance, Shqiperi is the Albanian name for Albania, Poland is named after Gdańsk, a city in northern Poland, the United States is Vespucciland after Amerigo Vespucci, Greece is named after the ancient region of Locris, etc.

The politics of the world are almost the same as our own, as well, right down to having analogues of Catholic Christianity, Eastern Orthodox Christianity, and Islam.

== Reception ==
Publishers Weekly praised the novel as a "fun romp", but observed its "lack of suspense", and noted that in terms of style, Turtledove is "no Terry Pratchett".
