= The Road Not Taken (short story) =

1985 short story by Harry Turtledove

- Short story by Harry Turtledove
- Country: United States
- Language: English
- Genre: Science fiction

Publication
- Published in: Analog Science Fiction/Science Fact
- Publisher: Dell Magazines
- Media type: Print (Magazine)
- Publication date: November 1985

Chronology
—	Herbig-Haro

"The Road Not Taken" is a science fiction short story by American writer Harry Turtledove about the first encounter between humanity and an alien race, the Roxolani. It is a prequel to another Turtledove short story entitled "Herbig-Haro".

== Plot summary ==
The story is told through limited third person point of view, with most of the story concerning a single Roxolani captain, Togram. During a routine journey of conquest, they happen upon Earth. The Roxolani anticipate a simple and rewarding campaign, as they detect no use of gravity manipulation, the cornerstone of their civilization. Humanity is awed by the alien invaders, as the maneuverability granted by their technology suggests the rest of their civilization is equally impressive. But as they begin their assault, things take a turn for the absurd—the Roxolani attack with matchlock weapons and black powder explosives. Humans retaliate with automatic weapons and missiles. The battle is over in minutes, and most of the invaders are killed. A few are captured alive.

When they are interrogated, the truth becomes evident: the method of manipulating gravity is absurdly simple, and species that discover it are able to use faster-than-light travel with primitive technological sophistication. This enabled them to engage in wars of conquest on a galactic scale. However, adopting the gravity technology stifles further technological development as the creative energies of societies that find it go into perfecting it. In contrast, humans somehow missed developing gravity manipulation and advanced further technologically. Unlike the broad reaching implications of Earth technology, gravity manipulation has no other uses.

As Togram and another Roxolani captive realize that they have now given a far more advanced civilization the means to travel to countless worlds, the story closes with the two asking themselves, "What have we done?"

== Publication history ==
The story was first published in Analog Science Fiction in the November 1985 issue. It is a prequel story to "Herbig-Haro"—set several centuries after humanity has conquered the Orion Arm of the Milky Way— published a year before under the name "Eric Iverson", and included in "The Stars at War" (Imperial Stars #1), edited by Jerry Pournelle.

This short story contains ideas which were later more developed in the Worldwar series, in which the invading aliens have an initial technological edge that is soon surpassed by human ingenuity and innovation.
