= Into the Darkness (novel) =

1999 fantasy novel by Harry Turtledove

- Author: Harry Turtledove
- Cover artist: Bob Eggleton
- Language: English
- Series: Darkness
- Genre: Fantasy
- Publisher: Tor Books
- Publication date: 1999
- Publication place: United States
- Media type: Print
- Followed by: Darkness Descending

Into the Darkness (1999) is a fantasy novel by American writer Harry Turtledove, the first book in the Darkness series.

== Plot summary ==
War breaks out in Derlavai a generation or two after the Six Years war. Most of the countries that declare war on Algarve do so only half-heartedly, allowing the Algarvians to use that reluctancy to their advantage. The Algarvians split Forthweg with Unkerlant and then overrun Valmiera, Jelgava, and Sibiu, while Unkerlant wrests away part of Zuwayza. Lagoas joins the war when Sibiu is taken. The book ends when the Algarvians "get the drop on" the Unkerlanters in Forthweg (who were plotting to attack them first). Kuusamo, meanwhile, tries to seize Obuda from Gyongyos but fails. Yanina succeeds in gaining control of the Land of the Ice People.

== Reception ==
The Darkness series received a generally positive response for its creative reimagining of World War II, often earning the nickname of "World War II with dragons". While many readers praised Turtledove's "magic-as-technology" world-building, some critics pointed to repetitive prose and a slow narrative pace across the six volumes as points of contention.
