= The Best of Harry Turtledove =

2021 book by Harry Turtledove

- Cover of first edition
- Author: Harry Turtledove
- Cover artist: Lee Moyer
- Language: English
- Genre: Science fiction
- Publisher: Subterranean Press
- Publication date: April 2021
- Publication place: United States
- Media type: Print (hardcover), ebook
- Pages: 584
- ISBN: 978-1-64524-022-8

The Best of Harry Turtledove is a collection of science fiction short stories by American author Harry Turtledove. It was first published in hardcover and ebook by Subterranean Press in April 2021.

== Summary ==
The book contains twenty-four short works of fiction by the author, together with a concluding blurb.

== Contents ==
- "The Visitor from the East" (from Thirty Days Later, Jun. 2016)
- "Peace is Better" (from Thirty Days Later, Jun. 2016)
- "Typecasting" (from Tor.com, Jun. 2016)
- "Junior and Me" (from Straight Outta Dodge City, Feb. 2020)
- "Bonehunters" (from Analog Science Fiction and Fact, May/Jun. 2019)
- "The Quest for the Great Gray Mossy" (from Analog Science Fiction and Fact, Jan./Feb. 2020)
- "Vilcabamba" (from Tor.com, Feb. 2010)
- "The Mammyth" (from Chicks and Balances, Jul. 2015)
- "The Eighth-Grade History Class Visits the Hebrew Home for the Aging" (from Tor.com, Jan. 2014)
- "Shtetl Days" (from Tor.com, Apr. 2011)
- "Zigeuner" (from Asimov's Science Fiction, Sep./Oct. 2017)
- "Bedfellows" (from The Magazine of Fantasy & Science Fiction, Jun. 2005)
- "News from the Front" (from Asimov's Science Fiction, Jun. 2007)
- "The Maltese Elephant" (from Analog Science Fiction and Fact, Aug. 1995)
- "Must and Shall" (from Asimov's Science Fiction, Nov. 1995)
- "Islands in the Sea" (from Alternatives, May 1989)
- "Deconstruction Gang" (from Amazing Stories, Sep. 1992)
- "The Genetics Lecture" (from Analog Science Fiction and Fact, Oct. 2005)
- "And So to Bed" (from Analog Science Fiction/Science Fact, Jan. 1986)
- "The Weather's Fine" (from Playboy, Jul. 1987)
- "The Castle of the Sparrowhawk" (from Fantasy Book, Sep. 1985)
- "The Last Article" (from The Magazine of Fantasy & Science Fiction, Jan. 1988)
- "The Girl Who Took Lessons" (from Playboy, Aug. 1988)
- "But It Does Move" (from Analog Science Fiction and Fact, Jun. 2009)
- "About Us"

== Awards ==
"Article" placed thirteenth in the 1989 Locus Poll Award for Best Novelette.

"Must and Shall" was nominated for the 1995 Sidewise Award for Best Short Form Alternate History, the 1996 Locus Poll Award for Best Novelette, the 1996 Hugo Award for Best Novelette, and the 1997 Nebula Award for Best Novelette.

"But It Does Move" placed second in the 2009 Analog Award for Best Novelette, and was a preliminary nominee for the 2010 Hugo Award for Best Novelette.

"Zigeuner" won the 2017 Sidewise Award for Best Short Form Alternate History.

"Bonehunters" won the 2019 Analog Award for Best Novelette.

"The Quest for the Great Gray Mossy" placed second in the 2020 Analog Award for Best Novelette.
