= List of Darkness viewpoint characters =

Harry Turtledove's the Darkness series is written in the third-person omniscient format from a large number of viewpoint characters. The first book, Into the Darkness, lists 17 viewpoint characters from 10 nations. Several of these viewpoint characters are killed off as the series progresses and new ones appear to take their place. The viewpoint characters rarely meet, so while the viewpoint may jump several times among a like number of characters in a chapter there is generally a substantial amount of writing done between jumps.

== Bembo ==
- Bembo is an Algarvian constable from the town of Tricarico in eastern Algarve. He is chubby, lazy, and prone to taking bribes. When Algarve occupies Forthweg, he is sent to serve as a constable in the occupation force - and to take part in rounding up Kaunians and sending them to their deaths. Precisely due to his venality, he is not the worst - being on occasion willing to save some people's lives in return for monetary or sexual favors. Turtledove sets him off in contrast to his partner Oraste, a dour and brutal man who enjoys breaking heads. In the end, Bembo returns to Tricarico and continues working as a constable under Kuusaaman occupation, while Oraste ends up a slave-labourer in the Unkerlanter mines - and there becomes a gang leader among the rough prisoners.

== Cornelu ==
- Cornelu is a Sibian Leviathan rider - riding on a huge cetacean which can eat a human in two bites but which can become very attached to its rider (and vice versa) and doing the equivalent of a submarine's job - from sinking enemy ships to ferrying spies and saboteurs into enemy territory and taking out VIP refugees such as the exile King of Forthweg. While he is on a mission, the Algarvians invade and conquer his homeland. Bitter but undaunted, he sets his Leviathan to swim to Lagoas and offers his services to their navy. He risks his life again and again and survives. Even when his beloved Leviathan Eforiel is killed by an Algarvian dragon, he swims to the Sibian shore, hides out in a logging camp and eventually manages to steal an Algarvian leviathan and return to the war. Yet upon his triumphant return to liberated Sibiu, he is poisoned by his wife, whom he found pregnant by an Algarvian officer. His wife is beheaded for the murder, and the fate of her unborn bastard and her and Cornelu's daughter is unknown.

== Ealstan ==
- Ealstan is a young Forthwegian, who appears in the very first and the very last episode of the series. In the beginning, he is a schoolboy, with no greater concerns than boredom at school and an idle curiosity about girls. The series takes him through a growing-up process greatly accelerated through war and occupation. A boys' rivalry with his cousin Sidroc turns literally into a matter of life and death when Sidroc becomes a collaborator with the Algarvian occupiers. Similarly, his meeting Vanai and their falling in love with each other, which in other circumstances might have been no more than an innocent teen love affair, becomes a highly sensitive and dangerous issue since she is one of the persecuted Kaunians, liable to be murdered out of hand for no more reason than having eyes and hair of a certain colour. They become totally committed to each other and get married, despite the laws prohibiting it. Much of Ealstan's story, particularly in the later books, revolves around his involvement in the Forthwegian resistance. He works as a bookkeeper, first for a half-Kaunian musician named Ethelhelm, then after having a falling out with him, he worked for Pybba, who ran the largest pottery business in Eoforwic. Pybba is quite secretive, and after Ealstan showed too much curiosity on where unaccounted-for funds went, he sacked him, but rehired him after hearing about what happened to Leofsig, as Pybba had been funding subversive activities against the Algarvians and now felt he could trust Ealstan. After the uprising at Eoforwic (Warsaw) is crushed by Algarve he evades capture, only to be impressed into the conquering Unkerlanter army. There, he is wounded fighting to take his home town, Gromheort - which turns out to be good fortune as it enables him to reunite with his family.
- In between all his dangerous adventures, Ealstan develops a skill as an accountant, a trade he learns from his father Hestan, together with also imbibing his father's deeply tolerant, humanitarian and broad-minded world-view.

== Fernao ==
- Fernao is a Lagoan mage of the first rank, one of the best mages in the kingdom. Starting out as a ship's mage, Fernao is later hired by a mysterious man whose identity is never fully revealed to travel to Yanina and rescue the fugitive King Penda of Forthweg, who fled after the fall of his own kingdom to Algarvian and Unkerlanter forces. Algarve and Unkerlant both demand that Penda be yielded to them, but Fernao, despite the untimely demise of his employer, is able to use his magic to get Penda to the land of the Ice People, and from there eventually makes his way to a Lagoan-held town from which the Sibian leviathan rider Cornelu is able to retrieve them just as Yaninan forces take the town. This experience leads to Fernao being assigned to the Lagoan expedition to take the austral continent from the Yaninans, who are supplying cinnabar (equivalent to oil) to their Algarvian allies from the mines there. Since Algarve has very little cinnabar in her own territory, the eventual Lagoan victory is a crippling blow to the Algarvian war effort. Before this occurs, however, Fernao is seriously injured by a bursting egg. Slowed down by magic, he is flown by dragon via several ships back to Setubal where he slowly starts to recover. He is then assigned to be the Lagoan representative on the Kuusaaman project to unify the laws of similarity and contagion, which ultimately leads to the development of spells equivalent to nuclear weapons. While working on the project, he falls in love with Pekka, a Kuusaaman theoretical sorcerer who developed the basis for their work, and they are married after Pekka's husband is killed during the liberation of Jelgava.

== Garivald ==
- Garivald, an Unkerlanter peasant, is perhaps analogous to Aleksandr Solzhenitsyn, though only in having literary talents and falling foul of the Soviet/Unkerlanter authorities, rather than in any specific biographical details. Garivald is an extremely capable and talented man, of which he himself is not fully aware, and would have gotten much further had he not been born an illiterate peasant under an oppressive regime which often rewards loyal service with severe punishment (especially when said service involved too much of an independent initiative). Specifically, he is from Unkerlant's Duchy of Grelz (analogue of the Ukraine), an area with some smouldering separatist tendencies, which makes the central government all the more suspicious of him. Shortly before the arrival of the invading Algarvian army, Garivald discovered that he has a talent for song and poetry, and once under occupation he applied this talent to composing patriotic songs, rousing the people to struggle, which soon became widely popular throughout the Algarvian-occupied part of Unkerlant. The Algarvians captured him, but on the way to execution he was liberated by a band of irregulars, soon became a renowned fighter as well as poet, and became the leader of the band when the previous leader was killed. Supported and complemented by the central government's emissaries as long as he was under occupation, once his band's area of operations was liberated he fell under suspicion - King Swemmel's "inspectors" (secret police) reasoning that a man who wrote subversive songs and headed insurgent guerrillas under one regime might continue to do so under another regime as well. Garivald slipped away in the night and returned to his original village - only to find it completely destroyed in the war, with his wife and children probably dead. Together with his lover Obilot, a former fellow-irregular who had also lost her entire family, he tried to hide out, the two of them cultivating a small forest clearing. Desperately needing to find the seed hidden by peasants in a ruined village, Garivald designs a magic spell which does the trick - but failed to draw from this any conclusion about his own innate power and ability. (Non-mages can perform some simple magic, but usually they use spells designed by professionals.) The couple's hide-out was discovered by the King's men - who didn't realize that "Fariulf", (as he now called himself) is the fugitive poet Garivald, but they did impress him into the army, then going into the offensive against the Algarvians and needing manpower to compensate for its enormous losses. Though a latecomer to the regular army, his evident ability soon earned him the rank of sergeant (had the war lasted a bit longer, he would have probably become an officer). He carefully refrained from composing any more songs, but the officer who taught him his letters soon noticed that his reports had a literary quality to them. Garivald took part in invading Algarve and cutting it in half, and was present when the Unkerlanters effected juncture with the Lagoan/Kuusaaman (Anglo-American) forces. Subsequently, the senior Kussaaman mage Ilmarinen, at the time a colonel, briefly met Garivald/Fariulf and detected in him "a blazing power, not magical though akin to magic power" whose like even Ilmarinen - one of the greatest mages of his generation - never encountered before. However, the Unkerlanters discovered Ilmarien's identity and, (correctly) suspecting him of espionage, barred him from their territory, so that he (and the reader, and for that matter Garivald himself) tantalisingly never found out more about the nature of Garivald's power. Meanwhile, after discharge from the army Garivald/Fariulf once again fell foul of the "inspectors" - for no more reason than that he had been in Algarve (Germany) long enough to notice how much richer and more highly developed than his own country it was - which could (and in fact, did) lead him to subversive thoughts. He was sent to twenty-five years in the cinnabar mines of the Mamming Hills, which amounted to a slow sentence of death. There he came in contact with Algarvian and Algarvian-allied captives, all feeling that on whatever side they had fought they had lost the war. He and Ceorl, who once fought each other, escaped together - Ceorl being killed by pursuing guards but Garivald managing to escape, helped on the way by sympathetic peasants, and rejoin Obilot - where the book finally leaves him. In the course of his escape, one further hint is given of Garivald's power: with a river too wide to swim in front of him and pursuit close behind, Garivald goes to sleep with the "irrational" belief that things will be okay in the morning - and wakes up to find the river full of logs which can be jumped across. It seems that Garivald is somehow able to manipulate events and even out a bit the enormous odds against him. That is all the reader can know, short of Turtledove writing a sequel.

== Hajjaj ==
- Hajjaj is the Zuwayzin (Finnish) foreign minister. As a young man, he studied in Trapani (analogue of Berlin) and remains fond of Algarvian (i.e. German) culture in preference to that of his country's oppressive neighbor Unkerlant (Russia/Soviet Union). He takes a central role in using the civil war among Unkerlanters in order to regain Zuwayza's independence, and thereafter loyally serves the Kings of Zuwayza as a diplomat to preserve that independence. Faced with an Unkerlanter attack (analogue of the Winter War), in which the Zuwayzi initially do well but are eventually overwhelmed, Hajjaj travels to Cottbus (Moscow), stands up to King Swemmel as few people dare to do, and gets terms which, while tough (Zuwayza loses quite a bit of territory, the equivalent of Karelia) still preserve his country's independence. Thereafter, he builds up the secret alliance with Algarve, bolstered by his personal friendship with the Algarvian ambassador Count Balastro. In the attack on Unkerlant (the Continuation War), Zuwayza does well; with the Unkerlanter capital directly threatened, they can't stop the Zuwayzi from regaining the territory they lost and a bit beside. However, Hajjaj is increasingly disturbed by the Algarvian massacre of Kaunians (historically, Finland - while an ally of Nazi Germany - rejected the Nazi persecution of Jews), makes secret efforts to get his country out of the war and convinces King Shazli to offer asylum to Kaunian refugees. With the collapse of Algarve forcing Zuwayza to seek terms, Hajjaj repeats his earlier performance - going to Cottbus and getting terms in which his country loses territory and accepts some restrictions on its sovereignty, but still keeps an independence which it might have lost. His last period in office involves a complication in his personal life, when the wife of the Yaninan ambassador asked for his personal protection. He finally resigns when the King refuses to give asylum to the now-fugitive Balastro, and hands him over to the Unkerlanters who execute him. While rationally aware that Zuwayza can't afford to offend the victorious Unkerlant, Hajjaj makes a gesture of loyalty to a friend in trouble and goes into retirement (where his opinion and "unofficial" involvement in sensitive diplomatic issues are still highly regarded).

== Ilmarinen ==
- Ilmarinen is a Kuusaman mage. He is analogous to Richard Feynman. He is brilliant, impulsive, and unpredictable, and his insight into the inverse relationship between the laws of similarity and contagion is crucial to the success of the Kuusaaman 'Manhattan Project'. He is convinced that the theory shows that similar magic would allow time travel, and although he was stopped from making an enormous mistake by attempting it with erroneous theory, he may do so again in the future.

== Istvan ==
- Istvan is a Gyongyosian soldier. At the beginning of the series, he was fighting the Unkerlanters in the mountain ranges between the two nations (an analogy to the Battle of Khalkhin Gol). He was sent to the Bothnian Ocean and fought Kuusaamans, then sent to participate in the Gyongyosian invasion of Unkerlant. There, inadvertently, he performed the most despicable act in Gyongyosian mores: he ate goats' flesh. He was very concerned that his secret would escape, but continued to soldier on until he was captured at Bechseley, by the end of the series he is the only survivor of the squad who ate goats flesh, leaving his secret safe. The Kuusumans released him to be a witness of the test of their magic, which destroyed Bechsely; but the Ekrekek's Eyes and Ears, the secret police, arrested him and confined him in prison where he refused to recant his account of what he'd seen, which the Eyes and Ears did not want to believe. While still imprisoned, he watched the destruction of the capital, and later helped in part of the cleanup operation before eventually returning to his home village of Kunhegyes.

== Krasta ==
- Krasta is a Valmerian marchioness. She is Skarnu's extremely haughty, shrewish, and spoiled sister. When the Algarvians occupy Priekule, the Valmerian capital, she ends up having an affair with an Algarvian colonel, Lurcanio, and bears his child. At the same time, she is friends with Valnu, who gives a great appearance of being a foppish, dissolute bisexual nobleman. There are hints throughout the first four books that he is a secret member of the Valmieran resistance, such as when a bomb explodes at a palace party after Valnu takes Krasta out of the palace for a walk, or when a pro-Algarvian nobleman with important information was taken out by the resistance after Krasta told him and nobody else about his itinerary, but it is revealed more fully later on.

== Leino ==
- Leino, Pekka's husband, is a practical mage (essentially, an engineer) involved in military-related research. In the early books he is seen only through his wife's eyes, becoming a viewpoint character in his own right only after the demise of Cornelu had created a kind of "vacancy", and Leino's own circumstances took him away from events which the reader was already seeing through Pekka's eyes. As first seen, as still officially a civilian expert in his normal university job, he helps develop a better armour for behemoths (equivalent to tanks). Then he is drafted and participates in a secret project on the austral continent - to turn an iceberg into a ship ( based on an actual, though uncompleted, project undertaken by the allies) called Habbakuk, specifically a dragon carrier which greatly increases the possibilities of bombing the Algravian-held territory and is instrumental in winning the war. Simultaneously with the beginning of Pekka's affair with Fernao, Leino also starts an affair with a Lagoan fellow-mage - Xavega, who at first treats him with haughty disdain, but they are brought together by having been both insulted by the odious King Donalitu of Jelgava, who they were supposed to restore to his throne. Unlike Pekka and Fernao, Leino and Xavega have no emotional hang-ups, never use the word "love" to each other, and do not plan on staying together after the war - but for the time being they enjoy the sex and act as a good magical team. They become, however, overconfident, trusting in superiority of "The New Magic" and fight the Algarvian mages in between bouts of love-making. Underestimating the enemy proves fatal: the Algarvians - with the more crude murder-magic - set a deadly trap, the earth opens under them and the two fall in and get crushed. Leino's death has indirect grave implications for the entire world, as grief and anger at his death - mixed with guilt feeling at having been unfaithful - help instill in the originally-gentle Pekka the ruthlessness needed to magically destroy the Gyongyosian capital and launch this world's equivalent of the nuclear age.

== Leofsig ==
- Leofsig is a Forthwegian soldier. He takes part in the ill-fated initial invasion of Algarve and is captured when it turns into rout. At the captives camp he stands up for the Kaunian captives, who suffer bullying and insults from both the Algarvian guards and racist fellow prisoners. He is sent to share with Kaunians the degrading work of digging latrines - which gets him also a share in the escape tunnel which the Kaunians secretly dig. On his return to his home in Gromheort, he continues to stand up for the Kaunians, and breaks up a promising relationship because his girlfriend - who could have become his wife - is an anti-Kaunian racist. Things eventually come to a head over the issue of his brother Ealstan living with Vanai, a Kaunian woman. The family living room becomes in effect a battlefield, and Leofsig is killed by his cousin Sidroc, an anti-Kaunian racist and collaborator with the Algarvians.

== Leudast ==
- Leudast is an Unkerlanter soldier. At the beginning of the series, like his counterpart Istvan, he is fighting the Gyongyosians in the mountain ranges between the nations. He is sent east to Forthweg to participate in the Unkerlanter occupation, and then to Zuwayza to take part in the "Summer War", where he encounters Marshal Rathar. Leudast makes sergeant and survives the initial Algarvian invasion of Unkerlant. In reoccupying the Duchy of Grelz, he captures the Algarvian set up as King of Grelz and is promoted to lieutenant. He takes part in the battles for western Algarve, including the occupation of Trapani, then is sent west to finish off Gyongyos. At the end of the series, he is one of the very few Unkerlanter soldiers to have lived through the entire war, fighting from its beginning to its end.

== Pekka ==
- Pekka is a Kuusaman mage. In her researches into magic, she discovers a principle analogous to the discovery of nuclear energy here-and-now. She becomes one of the leading researchers in the project to develop super-weapon based on this principle, to her surprise being accepted as an equal by Ilmarinen and Siuntio, the greatest theoretical mages of their age (possibly equivalent to Richard Feynman and Albert Einstein). She assumes direction of the "Naantali Distinct Project", (the Manhattan Project), having the combined roles of Leslie Groves and Robert Oppenheimer. A highly sympathetic character, warm-hearted, humorous, a devoted mother and a loyal wife, she agonises for over three volumes about having fallen in love with Fernao without falling out of love with her husband Leino - a dilemma solved tragically only when Algarvians kill Leino in a magical battle.
- Yet at the same time, Pekka gives her all to developing the most fearsome weapon her world has ever seen - with the best of motives, the apprehension that Algarvians may find it first and the urgent need to find a "clean" counterbalance to the Algarvian murder-powered magic. Eventually she gets to use the weapon herself, together with her beloved Fernao and with Illmarinen releasing enormous sorcerous energy upon the Gyongyosian capital Gyorvar, killing in a single instant all its inhabitants, including tens of thousands of other mothers and their children. In this she effectively assumes also the role of Colonel (later General) Paul W. Tibbets, Jr., commander of the plane Enola Gay which dropped the first atomic bomb and destroyed Hiroshima - though as a mage, she could actually feel the anguish and death of her victims, as a pilot could not. Immediately afterwards, she and Fernao have a rather bland wedding ceremony and settle down to domestic bliss in a nice provincial town, not too deeply haunted by what they had done - or so Turtledove would have his readers believe. (General Tibbets also has never expressed regret for using an ultimate weapon.)
- Note: "Pekka", like other Kuusaman names, is taken from Finnish. To non-Finnish readers, it is a plausible woman's name, but actually it is a typical male name, the Finnish equivalent to "Peter" (see , , ); the female version should be "Pekki". In fact, some of Finland's neighbours use it as a derogatory nickname referring to a drunken/bad-mannered Finnish tourist (see Offensive terms per nationality). It is unclear whether Turtledove was aware of this when he gave the name to a female character. (However, in many ways the series deliberately turns things upside down, as for example having blond, blue eyes Kaunian "Jews" persecuted by circumcised Algarvian "Nazis").

== Rathar ==
- Rathar is the Marshal of Unkerlant. He is analogous to Georgi Konstantinovich Zhukov. Originally a peasant conscripted during King Swemmel's civil war with his twin brother Kyot (equivalent to the Russian Civil War of 1918–1922), he rose to supreme command solely through his merits (which would not have been possible in other Derlavian countries, but Swemmel has weakened and decimated the Unkerlanter hereditary aristocracy). He is loyal to King Swemmel and has no designs on the throne (though he is not sure the King understands that) and is fiercely devoted to Unkerlant, constantly worried that if Swemmel has him replaced on a whim, the war will be handed over to less-competent leaders. His meetings with the King are always tense, with the possibility ever-present that they will end with his being killed or tortured by the paranoid monarch. Rathar much prefers being in the field - and not only because there he is superior to everybody else. Highly courageous, he often puts himself in personal danger in the front lines and lives simply and frugally, which makes him popular among soldiers (and civilians). He must always, however, keep down manifestations of such popularity for fear of arousing the King's suspicions. Rathar himself can be ruthless on occasion, as when ordering the summary execution of deserters, but never gratuitously. Up to the end of the book he manages to keep the delicate balance of winning the war while keeping Swemmel from turning on him. The dialogues between Rathar and Swemmel have some resemblance to those between Vyacheslav Molotov and Joseph Stalin in Turtledove's worldwar series. There is also a moment when he joins the front lines in Zuwayza where he and the Unkerlanter soldier Leudast are taking cover behind the same rock.

== Sabrino ==
- Sabrino is an Algarvian dragon-flyer. He is analogous to Hans-Ulrich Rudel. Courageous and gallant, always at the forefront of the fighting and arousing the immense loyalty of the dragon-riders under his command, he firmly opposes the mass killing of Kaunians and dares to speak his mind to King Mezentio in person - for which he is denied the promotion he amply deserves. Shot down during the last desperate fighting in Algarve, he loses a leg. In the aftermath, he rejects out of hand the Unkerlanter victors' offer to become their puppet king. The character bears some resemblance to Colonel Heinrich Jaeger, a German tank commander in Turtledove's Worldwar & Colonization Series.

== Sidroc ==
- Sidroc is a Forthwegian anti-Kaunian racist (i.e. Antisemite), and collaborator with Algarve. At the beginning of the war, Sidroc's home was destroyed and his mother and sister killed in a bombing, forcing Sidroc and his father Hengist to live with the family of his cousins Leofsig and Ealstan (who is Sidroc's schoolmate). Sidroc's bitterness at being in effect dependent on charity and jealousy of the much better scholar Ealstan fester, gradually turning a schoolboys' quarrel into a deadly vendetta. Sidroc develops into an active collaborator with the Algarvians (even though it was an Algarvian bomb which killed his mother) and anti-Kaunian racist, in direct opposition to his cousins' being Forthwegian patriots and "Kaunian-lovers" (literally in the case of Ealstan, who falls in love with the Kaunian Vanai). The conflict tearing the family apart culminates with Ealstan beating Sidroc senseless and running away, and later with Sidroc picking a fight in which he kills Leofsig - a result which he did not intend but did not regret, either.
- Sidroc avoids prosecution because of having enlisted in King Plegmund's Brigade, a Forthwegian-manned unit of the Algarvian army, analogous to the French Charlemagne Division of the Waffen SS. After intensive training he takes part in fighting guerrillas in the eastern Unkerlant, briefly facing Garivald (though they are not introduced to each other). He makes corporal during brutal fighting in which he takes part in such atrocities as raping peasant women and massacring Unkerlanter and Yaninan villagers. His (relatively) saving grace is his loyalty to his equally roguish comrades - especially Ceorl, a robber who joined the brigade since his other option was the gallows - and his sticking to the bitter end with the doomed Algarvian cause (even though he had originally joined up under the clear impression that the Algarvians were the winning side). Among the ruins of burning Trapani (analogue of Berlin), it falls to him to kill King Mezentio (Hitler) at the King's own request, depriving the Unkerlanter King Swemmel of the chance to kill Mezentio by slow torture. The shaken Sidroc is consolated in a highly uncharacteristic warm gesture by the rough Ceorl, and is soon afterwards killed in the Algarvian last stand against the Unkerlanter troops breaking into the royal palace.

== Ceorl (continuing the Sidroc thread) ==
- The Sidroc thread is continued by Ceorl as a brief point of view character, a brutally frank outlaw lacking in the slightest hint of hypocrisy or apology for his banditry and having no loyalty outside himself. Captured and sent to slave labour at the Unkerlanter Mamming Hills (Siberia), Ceorl - with a considerable previous prison experience - makes himself a gang leader among the slave labourers, which ensures him such small vital privileges as a place near the stove in the bitterly cold Unkerlanter winter nights. Nevertheless, he realizes that even so, the mines are a slow but certain death sentence. Staking all on the slim chance of escape, he chooses Garivald - their former bitter fight in the guerilla wars forging a paradoxical link between them - as his mate in this desperate enterprise. Pursued by guards with dogs, the two of them separate. Having hoped that the guards would pursue Garivald, Ceorl finds himself trapped but manages to kill several of his pursuers before being blazed down, dying as he had lived.

== Skarnu ==
- Skarnu is a Valmerian soldier. He starts off as a young Valmieran Marquis who took up the call to arms. With no other qualification for being an officer than his aristocratic title, he is willing to listen to his experienced commoner sergeant and gradually becomes a fairly capable officer - unlike other aristocratic officers whose arrogance and incompetence lead to military disaster and the occupation of Valmiera. Determined to fight on, he and his sergeant hide with a peasant family, and start being involved in the emerging irregular underground movement. When his host is killed by the Algarvian occupation he forms a strong liaison with his host's widow - a fierce peasant woman full of hatred of the Algarvians and their collaborationist Valmieran nobility. Together, they take part in daring raids, killing collaborators and rescuing Kaunian prisoners en route to being killed for the Algarvian murder magic, as well as producing and distributing leaflets revealing the Algarvian atrocities - she being slowed down only by the birth of their child. Skarnu, under his nom de guerre Pavilosta, becomes a leading member of the resistance - which earns him a high place on the Algarvian "most wanted" list. He furtively moves from one town to another and has several narrow escapes, with the hunt on him coordinated by the Algarvian lover of his collaborationist sister Krasta. After the liberation of Valmiera, his by now official wife takes revenge on Krasta by cutting her hair (as was actually done in 1944 France to women who had liaisons with Germans). Finally, he is rewarded with getting the estate of an oppressive collaborationist nobleman which he killed, and tries his best for the peasants. To some degree, he stands for the aristocrats who joined the French Resistance. But since the Valmieran society described is more like that of pre-1789 French society than of the 1940s, the character might also be inspired by aristocrats who sided with the French Revolution against other aristocrats.

== Spinello ==
- Spinello is an Algarvian major (later colonel), whose character expresses the complicated and contradictory Algarvian attitude to the Kaunians. Before the war he was a scholar specializing in ancient Kaunian culture and liked to spend quiet hours at the Kaunian Museum in Trapani, the Algarvian capital. With the outbreak of war he becomes the military governor of the Forthweg village where Vanai and her grandfather Brivibas live. Spinello first befriends Brivibas, a famous Kaunian scholar of whom he heard a lot, and treats him as a pupil to master. Then, however, Spinello begins to demand that he publish an endorsement of Algarvian rule, and upon Brivibas' complete refusal Spinello forces him into hard physical labour which would soon lead to his death. To save her grandfather, Vanai agrees to have sexual relations with Spinello, who is well-aware that she finds him hateful but enjoys imposing his will on her - which clearly has as much to do with her being Kaunian as with her being an attractive young woman. As seen through Vanai's eyes, he is a hateful monster. In desperation, Vanai casts a spell to make him go away, and Spinello is sent to Unkerlant to command the unit in which Trasone serves; he and his fellow soldiers are surprised to see their theatrical new commander develop into a good combat officer, brave without being reckless and caring about his men's welfare - though they soon feel tired of his repeated boasts about his sexual exploits with Vanai. Spinello is wounded at Sulingen (Stalingrad) and is evacuated at the last moment to save his life from the tightening siege.
- At his point, Spinello becomes a viewpoint character in his own right. Back in Trapani, he visits the museum and is severely reproved by his old teacher for the army's persecution of Kaunians. Back at the front, he forms a liaison with another Kaunian girl, Yadwigai, who has been adopted as a mascot by his new unit. This time, the relationship is entered into willingly by the girl and is based on as much mutual trust and affection as could be expected in the circumstances. Spinello and Yadwigai escape together through the marches, hunted by the advancing Unkerlanters, and reach Forthweg, where she departs though bearing no ill-will to Spinello. However, at the Forthwegian capital Spinello resumes his habit of boasting to everybody around of his relations with Vanai - with fatal consequences. Vanai, who still deeply hates Spinello, hears about it from her husband Ealstan, who happened to hear Spinello talk with his soldiers in the street. Furious and determined to get her revenge at last, Vanai disguises herself magically and feeds Spinello poison mushrooms which kill him three days later.

== Talsu ==
- Talsu is a Jelgavan tailor who fought in the Jelgavan army until its surrender. Returning home, he found himself as pawn between the resistance and the Algarvian occupiers, including being thrown into a dungeon. He assists the Kuusaaman army in liberating his country, only to be thrown back into a dungeon again and interrogated by the same persons who worked for the Algarvians. His wife writes Pekka, the Kuusaaman mage, and the Jelgavan government releases him from prison and expels him into Kuusaman custody.

== Tealdo ==
- Tealdo is an Algarvian soldier, the friend of Trasone. The story follows him from being a raw recruit taking part in the bloodless occupation of Bari (analogous to the Austrian Anschluß ), through the relatively easy conquests of Sibiu, Valmiera and Jelgava, and through the first part of the war in Unkerlant. Tealdo becomes a veteran, learns to kill and act ruthlessly, but also shows unexpected compassion and sensitivity in an encounter with a starving girl in occupied Jelgava. He is killed at the high-tide mark of the invasion when Algarvian soldiers get within sight of Cottbus (Moscow) but are thrown back.

== Trasone ==
- Trasone is an Algarvian soldier, Tealdo's friend and comrade in arms, who continues this thread after Tealdo's death. A member of an army which commits terrible atrocities, Trasone is not personally party to them. He is a seasoned combat veteran, daily fighting the Unkerlanters and developing a grudging respect for them. He takes part in the battle of Sulingen (Battle of Stalingrad) and is part of the Algarvian forces which are cut off and are in an increasingly desperate situation. In his final scene he and his superior and friend, Sergeant Panfilo, are shown facing bravely and stoically the certainty of their approaching doom, and recalling Tealdo who was killed a year before. Soon afterwards, the Unkerlanters launch their final assault and Trasone is killed by an exploding "egg".

== Vanai ==
- Vanai is a Forthwegian Kaunian girl, which would have made her lot in life difficult in any case. It is made more difficult by being orphaned at a young age and being raised by her grandfather Brivibas - a brilliant scholar, but authoritarian, egocentric and narrow-minded. She becomes increasingly alienated from her own people, especially after consenting to have sexual relations with Spinello in order to save her grandfather's life, which makes her a collaborator in the eyes of other Kaunians - and for his part Brivibas, rather than be grateful, treats her narrow-mindedly as a "whore". Ealstan offers her a way out with his warm love and empathy, and she elopes with him without looking back. But their new life in the Forthwegian capital Eoforic (analogue of Warsaw) is threatened by the escalating persecution of Kaunians. Vanai becomes a virtual prisoner in their apartment, any venturing putting her in life danger (one time when she had to, in order to get medicine for the seriously ill Ealstan, she was nearly caught by Algarvian constables but saved by the capital's more pro-Kanunian lower-class crowd).
- Finally, she figures out the spell which allows herself (and afterwards, other Kaunians as well) to masquerade as Forthwegians - a great service to her people and a major blow against Algarve. However, the spell is ineffective for pregnant women, when it has to "cover" two persons, and Vanai is caught and sent to the Kaunian Quarter (Warsaw Ghetto) where she manages to survive several lethal Algarvian raids and finally succeeds in escaping during an Unkerlanter bombing, reuniting with Ealstan and safely giving birth to a baby daughter. She manages also to survive during the doomed, destructive Forthwegian uprising (Warsaw Uprising), and to get her revenge on Spinello whom she poisons with mushrooms. At the end of the series she finds a safe haven, warmly received by Ealstan's broad-minded family, starting a second pregnancy and in general having as happy a prospect as anyone can in the Unkerlanter-dominated post-war Forthweg - a situation which she, as a Kaunian who did not fare so well even in the pre-war independent Forthweg, minds less than her Forthwegian (Polish) patriotic husband.
