= List of fictional universes in literature =

This is a list of fictional universes in literature.

Universe	Origin	Creation date	Author	Notes
1632-verse	1632	2000	Eric Flint	
The 5th Wave universe	The 5th Wave	2013	Rick Yancey	
Abeir-Toril	Forgotten Realms	1985	Ed Greenwood	Location of Forgotten Realms novels and games
Acorna universe	Acorna: The Unicorn Girl	1997	Anne McCaffrey, Margaret Ball, & Elizabeth Ann Scarborough	
Alagaësia	Eragon	2002	Christopher Paolini	The settings of the novels of the Inheritance Cycle: Eragon, Eldest, Brisingr and Inheritance
Agatha Christie's fictional universe	The Mysterious Affair at Styles	1920	Agatha Christie	
All-World	The Dark Tower: The Gunslinger	1982	Stephen King	The setting for the Dark Tower series of novels and derived works, which also ties into all of King's other novels, such as The Stand and Eyes of the Dragon. Includes the towns of Derry, 'Salem's Lot and Castle Rock, and the recurring antagonist Randall Flagg.
Alliance-Union universe	Heavy Time	1991	C. J. Cherryh	The setting for an epic future history series extending from the 21st century out into the far future. It consists of 27 science fiction novels along with a series of seven short story anthologies and a few other miscellaneous works.
Amber multiverse	Nine Princes in Amber	1970	Roger Zelazny	Multiverse in which The Chronicles of Amber take place; two worlds of opposed chaos and order of which all others are merely "shadows"
Amtor	Pirates of Venus	1934	Edgar Rice Burroughs	A fictionalised version of the planet Venus as depicted in the Venus series of novels featuring the character Carson Napier
Anita Blake mythology	Guilty Pleasures	1993	Laurell K. Hamilton	Alternate history in which the contemporary United States is reinterpreted into a world in which vampires, necromancy, and fairies exist. Setting for the Anita Blake: Vampire Hunter series of novels
Anno Dracula universe	Anno Dracula	1992	Kim Newman	
Avonlea	Anne of Green Gables	1908	Lucy Maud Montgomery	Fictional location on Prince Edward Island, Canada, and setting for a series of novels featuring the character Anne Shirley.
Barsetshire	The Warden	1855	Anthony Trollope	Featured in the series of novels known as the "Chronicles of Barsetshire". The county town and cathedral town is Barchester. Other towns mentioned in the novels include Silverbridge, Hogglestock and Greshamsbury.
Barsoom	Under the Moons of Mars	1912	Edgar Rice Burroughs	A fictionalised version of the planet Mars in over 100 adventure stories featuring the character John Carter
Bas-Lag	Perdido Street Station	2000	China Miéville	Steampunk setting for a trilogy of novels.
BattleTech Universe	Battledroids	1984	Jordan Weisman, L. Ross Babcock III, & Patrick Larkin	Futuristic wargame setting created for the Battledroids/BattleTech boardgame, also detailed in more than 100 print novels by various authors (including Michael A. Stackpole, William H. Keith Jr., Robert N. Charrette, Blaine Lee Pardoe, Loren L. Coleman, and numerous others) plus print anthologies and additional novels and stories published in electronic format.
Beklan Empire	Shardik	1974	Richard Adams	Kingdom in which slavery is legal and setting for the novels Shardik and Maia
Bensalem	New Atlantis	1624	Sir Francis Bacon	Utopian community in the Pacific Ocean that focuses on scientific discovery
Blandings Castle	Something Fresh	1915	P. G. Wodehouse	An idealized English country estate (with nearby village) and seat of the Threepwood family
Bobiverse	We Are Legion	2016	Dennis E. Taylor	
Boxen	Boxen: The Imaginary World of the Young C. S. Lewis	1908	C. S. Lewis & Warren Lewis	Animal-based kingdom (complete with its own politics, economics and government) created by CS Lewis and his brother when they were young; heavily influenced by Beatrix Potter
Carcosa	An Inhabitant of Carcosa	1886	Ambrose Bierce	Carcosa is a fictional ruined city in which the spirit of a man roamed and found he was dead, later borrowed by Robert W. Chambers for weird fantasy The King In Yellow
Catteni universe	Freedom's Landing	1995	Anne McCaffrey	
A Certain Magical Index Universe	To Aru Majutsu no Index Volume 1	2004	Kazuma Kamachi	Consists mainly of Academy City, a futuristic city-state near Tokio, and its surroundings. Magic and science compete for supremacy while many heroes and villains from different factions fight to understand the true nature of the world. Setting for many storylines in the main books as well as the numerous spin offs the franchise has to offer.
City of the Sun	The City of the Sun	1602	Tommaso Campanella	Theocratic society in which goods, women and children are held in common.
CoDominium	A Spaceship for the King	1973	Jerry Pournelle	Interstellar empire controlled by a unified United States and Soviet Union.
Corona	The Demon Awakens	1997	R. A. Salvatore	Setting for The DemonWars Saga and The Highwayman. Bears a strong resemblance to eastern Canada
Cosmere	Elantris	2005	Brandon Sanderson	The Cosmere is the fictional universe in which the various worlds in most of Sanderson's adult fantasy works are set.
The Culture	Consider Phlebas	1987	Iain M. Banks	Interstellar anarchist, socialist, and utopian society created for a number of science fiction novels and works of short fiction collectively called the Culture series.
Dark Hunter Universe	Dark-Hunters (formerly Fantasy Lover)	2002	Sherrilyn Kenyon	
Darkover	The Planet Savers	1958	Marion Zimmer Bradley	Fictional planet in orbit around a red giant star and setting for the Darkover series of novels.
Deathstalker universe	Mistworld	1992	Simon R. Green	Setting for the Deathstalker series; a totalitarian, corrupt human galactic empire in which dissent is crushed and alien races are enslaved or exterminated
Derlavai	Into the Darkness	1999	Harry Turtledove	Fantasy land in which The Darkness Series, a retelling of World War II in a fantasy context, takes place
Deverry	Daggerspell	1986	Katharine Kerr	Celtic-inspired fantasy kingdom that is the setting for the Deverry Cycle
Dinotopia	Dinotopia: A Land Apart from Time	1992	James Gurney	Lost land in which humans coexist with sapient dinosaurs.
The Dire Earth Cycle	The Darwin Elevator	2013	Jason M. Hough	
The Discworld	The Colour of Magic	1983	Terry Pratchett	A flat world set on the backs of four elephants who in turn stand on the back of a giant turtle, the Discworld is the setting for 41 comedic fantasy novels.
Divergent	Divergent	2011	Veronica Roth	Set in a post-apocalyptic version of Chicago.
Dreamlands	Polaris	1918	H. P. Lovecraft	A vast, alternate dimension that can be entered via dreams.
The Dresden Files	Storm Front	2000	Jim Butcher	
Dune universe	Dune	1965	Frank Herbert	Interstellar empire governed by a feudal system dominated by Great Houses and dependent on the Spice that forms only on the planet Arrakis, or Dune.
Dying Earth	The Dying Earth	1950	Jack Vance	Far future world in which the Sun has almost exhausted its fuel and magic reasserted itself. Setting for the Dying Earth series
Earthsea	The Word of Unbinding	1964	Ursula K. Le Guin	Fantasy realm consisting of an archipelago of islands in a vast ocean that forms the setting for six books and seven short stories.
Earwa	The Darkness That Comes Before	2004	R. Scott Bakker	Fantasy realm that combines alien technology with magic
Eight Worlds	"Bagatelle"	1974	John Varley	
The Emberverse/Nantucket	Island in the Sea of Time	1998	S. M. Stirling	
Emelan	Sandry's Book	1997	Tamora Pierce	Pseudo-mediaeval magical setting for the Circle of Magic series
Empire duet	Empire	2006	Orson Scott Card	
Empire of Man	March Upcountry	2001	David Weber & John Ringo	
The Enderverse	Ender's Game	1985	Orson Scott Card	
Endworld	The Fox Run	1986	David L. Robbins	
Erewhon	Erewhon: or, Over the Range	1872	Samuel Butler	Satirical society that parodies Victorian conventions.
Everworld	Search for Senna	1999	Katherine Applegate and Michael Grant	
Fablehaven	Fablehaven	2006	Brandon Mull	
Familias Regnant universe	Hunting Party	1993	Elizabeth Moon	Feudal galactic society in the far future
Fear Street Multiverse	The New Girl	1989	R. L. Stine	A fictional universal world Multiverse where the various Fear Street continuities all take place ranging from the books, films, and everything in between and beyond.
Field of Arbol	Out of the Silent Planet	1938	C. S. Lewis	A fictionalised version of the Solar System, as depicted in the fictional theology of the Space Trilogy.
Finisterre universe	Rider at the Gate	1995	C. J. Cherryh	Hostile alien planet of telepathic flora and fauna
Friardale universe	The Magnet issue 1	1908	Frank Richards	A world containing a number of private boys and girls schools.
Flatland	Flatland: A Romance of Many Dimensions	1884	Edwin Abbott Abbott	Authoritarian 2-dimensional world inhabited by sentient geometric shapes ignorant of the "higher dimensions" of up and down.
Foreigner universe	Foreigner	1994	C. J. Cherryh	Centres around the descendants of a ship lost in transit from Earth en route to found a new space station.
Foundation universe	"Strange Playfellow"	1940	Isaac Asimov	Future history of humanity's colonization of the galaxy, spanning nearly 25,000 years, created through the gradual fusion of the Robot, Foundation and Empire series'.
Foundationverse	SCP-173	2007	An anonymous 4Chan user	A colloquial name for the multiversal setting of the internet collaborative writing project the SCP Foundation, where the titular organization is responsible for the containment and study of supernatural entities and objects. Also known as the SCP-verse, Skipverse or Scipverse.
The Four Lands	The Sword of Shannara	1977	Terry Brooks	A fantasy realm in which the Shannara series is set. Possibly a future post-apocalyptic Earth.
Future History	Life-Line	1939	Robert Heinlein	Future history of humanity from the mid 20th century to the 23rd, seen largely through the eyes of the immortal Howard families, in particular Lazarus Long.
Gaea universe	Titan	1979	John Varley	
Gaean Reach	Trullion: Alastor 2262	1973	Jack Vance	
Galactic Center Saga	In the Ocean of Night	1977	Gregory Benford	
Galactic Marines universe	Semper Mars	1998	William H. Keith Jr.	
The Gap Cycle	The Gap into Conflict: The Real Story	1991	Stephen R. Donaldson	
Gene Wars Universe	Hammerfall	2001	C. J. Cherryh	Currently consists of two science fiction novels (Hammerfall and Forge of Heaven).
Gezeitenwelt	Der Wahrträumer	2002	Bernhard Hennen and others	Alternate world hit by a comet that forms the setting for a series of post-apocalyptic novels
Goosebumps Multiverse	Welcome to Dead House	July 1992	R.L. Stine	A fictional universal world Multiverse where the various Goosebumps continuities all take place ranging from the books (including the original series, Give Yourself Goosebumps, Series 2000, HorrorLand, Most Wanted, and SlappyWorld), comics, films, television series, video games, and everything in between and beyond.
Gor	Tarnsman of Gor	1966	John Norman	"Counter-Earth", sword and planet setting for 30 novels. Its depiction (and apparent endorsement) of aggressively subdued women has been widely criticised as sexist.
Gormenghast	Titus Groan	1946	Mervyn Peake	Grim castle and surroundings that is the setting for the Gormenghast series of gothic fantasy novels.
Green-Sky	Below the Root	1975	Zilpha Keatley Snyder	Low-gravity forest planet inhabited by an arboreal culture
Grishaverse	Shadow and Bone	2012	Leigh Bardugo	The fictional universe of Leigh Bardugo's fantasy novels, starting with Shadow and Bone trilogy, which includes Siege and Storm and Ruin and Rising. It is also the universe which includes the Six of Crows and King of Scars duologies. Named for the magical Grisha, a central group in the books.
Islands of Gulliver's Travels	Gulliver's Travels	1726	Jonathan Swift	Series of islands visited by Lemuel Gulliver in the satirical novel Gulliver's Travels, including Lilliput and Blefuscu, Brobdingnag, Laputa and the land of the Houyhnhnms (although Brobdingnag is not an island but a peninsula attached to North America).
Gwynedd	Deryni Rising	1970	Katherine Kurtz	Setting for the Deryni novels; an alternate-mediaeval kingdom in which certain people (Deryni) have magic powers
Hainish Cycle	Rocannon's World	1966	Ursula K. Le Guin	
Halla	The Merchant of Death	2002	D. J. MacHale	Setting for The Pendragon Adventure; the sum of all alternate realities.
Hammerverse	Hammer's Slammers	1979	David Drake	
Harry Potter universe	Harry Potter and the Philosopher's Stone	1997	J. K. Rowling	The fictional universe of J. K. Rowling's Harry Potter series of fantasy novels comprises two separate and distinct societies: a Muggle world (our own world) and a "wizarding world" (various magically hidden places throughout the world).
Heechee Saga	Gateway	1977	Frederik Pohl	
Heirs of Alexandria	The Shadow of the Lion	2002	Mercedes Lackey, Eric Flint, & Dave Freer	
His Dark Materials worlds	Northern Lights (aka The Golden Compass)	1995	Philip Pullman	Multiverse setting for the trilogy His Dark Materials. Northern Lights centres on a world in which every human has a companion animal, (a daemon) that represents their personality, books 2 and 3 are set in other worlds, including our own.
Honorverse	On Basilisk Station	1992	David Weber	Future interstellar setting in which humans have been genetically altered to cope with various alien environments.
Hundred Acre Wood	Winnie-the-Pooh	1926	A. A. Milne	Setting for the Winnie-the-Pooh series of children's books based on Ashdown Forest in Sussex
Hyborian Age and Thurian Age	The Shadow Kingdom	1929	Robert E. Howard	Supposedly mythical times during which the stories concerning Kull of Atlantis, Conan the Barbarian and Red Sonja are set.
Hyperion universe	Hyperion	1989	Dan Simmons	
Instrumentality of Mankind	The Planet Buyer	1964	Cordwainer Smith	Interstellar human empire 14,000 years in the future; setting for two novels and a series of short stories collected in The Rediscovery of Man
Isaac's Universe	The Diplomacy Guild	1990	Isaac Asimov	Invented by Asimov for other science fiction writers to use.
Jack Ryan Universe	The Hunt for Red October	1984	Tom Clancy	
Janissaries	Janissaries	1979	Jerry Pournelle, Roland J. Green, Phillip Pournelle & David Weber	
Jason Bourne Universe	The Bourne Identity	1980	Robert Ludlum	
Jeżycjada	Małomówny i rodzina	1975	Małgorzata Musierowicz	Setting of twenty two books.
Kelewan	Magician	1982	Raymond E. Feist	High fantasy setting for The Riftwar Saga.
Known Space	"The Coldest Place"	1964	Larry Niven	Interstellar region inhabited by a future humanity. Created by Niven for him and other writers to use.
The Meg/Loch	Meg: A Novel of Deep Terror	1997	Steve Alten	
Lake Wobegon	Lake Wobegon Days	1985	Garrison Keillor	Fictional Minnesota town characterized as the town where "all the women are strong, all the men are good looking, and all the children are above average."
The Land	Lord Foul's Bane	1977	Stephen R. Donaldson	Thomas Covenant is transported to a world simply called "the Land" by the Staff of Power and is enlisted by its inhabitants to stop Lord Foul from destroying it.
Landover	Magic Kingdom for Sale — SOLD!	1986	Terry Brooks	Rural high fantasy world and setting for six novels.
Left Behind	Left Behind: A Novel of the Earth's Last Days	1995	Tim LaHaye and Jerry B. Jenkins	
Legacy of the Aldenata	A Hymn Before Battle	2000	John Ringo, Tom Kratman, and Julie Cochrane	
Lensman	Triplanetary	1948	E. E. Smith	
L'Engle multiverse	Meet the Austins	1962	Madeleine L'Engle	Science fiction multiverse infused with Christian religious themes and featuring a number of recurring characters.
Leviathan universe	Leviathan	2009	Scott Westerfeld	
Liaden universe	Agent of Change	1988	Sharon Lee and Steve Miller	Setting for an ongoing series of science fiction stories.
Lord Darcy universe	Murder and Magic	1979	Randall Garrett	
Lovecraft Country	The Picture in the House	1920	H. P. Lovecraft	Fictional region of Massachusetts in which several stories by Lovecraft take place, as part of his wider Cthulhu Mythos. Areas within it include Arkham, Dunwich, Innsmouth, Kingsport and the Miskatonic River.
The Lunar Chronicles	Cinder	2012	Marissa Meyer	
World of Malazan Book of the Fallen	Gardens of the Moon	1999	Steven Erikson	Fictional world of many of Steven Erikson's and Ian Cameron Esslemont's novels and novellas.
Michael Vey universe	Michael Vey: The Prisoner of Cell 25	2011	Richard Paul Evans	
Mars trilogy	Red Mars	1992	Kim Stanley Robinson	
Maximum Ride	Maximum Ride: The Angel Experiment	2005	James Patterson	
The Maze Runner universe	The Maze Runner	2009	James Dashner	
Mecha Samurai Empire	United States of Japan	2016	Peter Tieryas	
Middle-earth	The Hobbit	1936	J. R. R. Tolkien	The setting of the majority of Tolkien's fantasy writings, including The Hobbit, The Lord of the Rings and The Silmarillion. Middle-earth represents the Old World of our planet Earth (named Arda in the stories) in a fictional (pre)historic era.
Mistborn	The Final Empire	2006	Brandon Sanderson	
Misterland	Mr. Tickle	1971	Roger Hargreaves	Setting of Mr. Men and Little Miss series.
Mortal Engines Quartet	Mortal Engines	2001	Philip Reeve	
The Mouse That Roared universe	The Mouse That Roared	1955	Leonard Wibberley	Beware of the Mouse prequel to The Mouse That Roared and The Mouse on the Moon, sequel to The Mouse That Roared
Monster Hunter universe	Monster Hunter International	2007	Larry Correia	
The Multiverse	Behold the Man	1969	Michael Moorcock	Concept that forms the basis for several of Moorcock's novels via the Eternal Champion and the struggle between Law and Chaos
MythAdventures	Another Fine Myth	1978	Robert Lynn Asprin	
Nancy Drewniverse	The Secret of the Old Clock	1930	Edward Stratemeyer	A fictional universal world Multiverse where the various Nancy Drew continuities all take place ranging from literature, comic books, films, live-action television series, tabletop games, and video games. It is also the setting for The Hardy Boys, Tom Swift, and The Dana Girls.
Narnia	The Lion, the Witch and the Wardrobe	1950	C. S. Lewis	setting for the 7-volume fantasy series The Chronicles of Narnia. It includes the world of Narnia, Earth of the 1940s and 1950s, and other possible worlds (such as Charn) suggested by The Magician's Nephew.
Nations of Nineteen Eighty-Four	Nineteen-Eighty Four	1949	George Orwell	A perpetually war-torn world ruled by super-states.
Nehwon	"The Jewels in the Forest"	1939	Fritz Leiber	Common setting for the series of fantastical short stories featuring the characters Fafhrd and the Gray Mouser. Its capital is Lankhmar.
Nemesis Saga	Project Nemesis	2012	Jeremy Robinson	
Neverland	Peter Pan, or The Boy Who Wouldn't Grow Up	1904	Sir J. M. Barrie	An island representing the imagination of a child
Neverness Universe	Neverness	1988	David Zindell	
The Night's Dawn Trilogy	The Reality Dysfunction	1996	Peter F. Hamilton	
Noon Universe	Noon: 22nd Century	1967	Arkady and Boris Strugatsky	("Мир Полудня" or "Мир Полдня" - "World of Noon") is a fictional future setting for a number of hard science fiction novels.
Northern Lights universe	Northern Lights	1995	Philip Pullman	
Nowhere	News From Nowhere	1890	William Morris	Utopian socialist society
Okal Rel Universe	Throne Price	2003	Lynda Williams	Sevolite super-pilots adept at Reality Skimming (FTL travel) work out cultural differences with technically sophisticated Reetions and associated canon by collaborators also set in the Okal Rel Universe.
Old Man's War Universe	Old Man's War	2005	John Scalzi	
Opening of the World	Beyond the Gap	2007	Harry Turtledove	
Osten Ard	The Dragonbone Chair	1988	Tad Williams	Fantastical continent populated by humans, elf-like Sithi and troll-like Quanuc. Setting for the Memory, Sorrow and Thorn trilogy
Outlanders	Exile to Hell	1997	Mark Ellis	
Oz	The Wonderful Wizard of Oz	1900	L. Frank Baum	Fantasy land initially created by Baum and subsequently elaborated on by several other authors in 40 canonical novels. Baum set numerous other novels and short stories explicitly in the same universe, including The Magical Monarch of Mo, Dot and Tot of Merryland, The Life and Adventures of Santa Claus, Queen Zixi of Ix, John Dough and the Cherub, The Sea Fairies, Sky Island, "The Enchanted Types," "The Dummy that Lived," "A Kidnapped Santa Claus", "The Runaway Shadows", "The Ryl of the Lilies," "The Yellow Ryl," "Nelebel's Fairyland," and "The Littlest Giant".
Panem	The Hunger Games	2008	Suzanne Collins	Set in a totalitarian future of North America that is the setting for the Hunger Games trilogy.
Pegāna	The Gods of Pegāna	1905	Lord Dunsany	A realm, which is described as "The Middle of All", where a pantheon of fictional gods reside.
Pern	Dragonflight	1968	Anne McCaffrey	Fictional planet and setting for the Dragonriders of Pern novel series, in which genetically engineered dragons fight an alien menace called Thread.
Perry Rhodan	Enterprise Stardust	1961	Karl-Herbert Scheer & Clark Darlton	
Petaybee universe	Powers That Be	1993	Anne McCaffrey & Elizabeth Ann Scarborough	
Pointland	Flatland: A Romance of Many Dimensions	1884	Edwin Abbott Abbott	0-Dimensional world occupied by a single sentient point called "The Monarch of Pointland"
Prydain	The Book of Three	1964	Lloyd Alexander	Fantasy Celtic Britain that forms the setting for the Chronicles of Prydain
Rafał Kosik's universe	Mars	2003	Rafał Kosik	Setting of Rafał Kosik's novels and short stories.
The Republic	The Republic	380 BC	Plato	Idealised "perfect society" as depicted by Plato in his dialogues The Republic and Laws
Revelation Space universe	Revelation Space	2000	Alastair Reynolds	Used as the setting for a number of novels and stories which follow the fictional history of humans from roughly 2200 to 40,000 AD.
The Riftwar Cycle	Magician	1982	Raymond E. Feist	
Riordanverse	Percy Jackson and the Lightning Thief	2005	Rick Riordan	Set in the modern world where gods from mythology exist; and consists of the series Percy Jackson & the Olympians, The Heroes of Olympus, The Trials of Apollo, The Kane Chronicles and Magnus Chase and the Gods of Asgard.
Riverworld	To Your Scattered Bodies Go	1971	Philip Jose Farmer	"Afterlife" in which every human who ever lived is continuously reincarnated beside a seemingly endless river.
Safehold universe	Off Armageddon Reef	2007	David Weber	
The Saga of Recluce	The Magic of Recluce	1991	L. E. Modesitt Jr.	
The Saga of Seven Suns	Hidden Empire	2002	Kevin J. Anderson	
Saga of the Skolian Empire	Primary Inversion	1995	Catherine Asaro	
Sentinels Universe	When Strikes the Warlord	2006	Van Allen Plexico	
Sime~Gen Universe	"Operation High Time"	1969	Jacqueline Lichtenberg	
Island of Sodor	The Three Railway Engines	1945	Rev. W. Awdry	Fictional island in the Irish Sea between Wales and the Isle of Man; home to the characters of the Railway Series of books, including sentient locomotives Thomas the Tank Engine, James the Red Engine and Gordon the Big Engine.
The Shadowhunter Chronicles	City of Bones	2007	Cassandra Clare	
Shaper/Mechanist universe	"Swarm"	1982	Bruce Sterling	
Southern Vampires universe	Dead Until Dark	2001	Charlaine Harris	Alternate history in which vampires, werewolves and other supernatural creatures coexist with humans. Setting for the Southern Vampire Mysteries
Southern Victory universe	How Few Remain	1997	Harry Turtledove	
The Sprawl	Fragments of a Hologram Rose	1977	William Gibson	Futuristic urban sprawl that forms the setting for the Sprawl trilogy of science fiction novels, as well as four short stories
Star Wars Expanded Universe	Star Wars: From the Adventures of Luke Skywalker	1976	George Lucas, Alan Dean Foster, among others	
StarFist Universe	First to Fight	1997	David Sherman & Dan Cragg	
The Strain universe	The Strain	2009	Guillermo del Toro & Chuck Hogan	
The Sword of Truth	Wizard's First Rule	1994	Terry Goodkind	
The Talents universe	To Ride Pegasus	1973	Anne McCaffrey	
TekWar Universe	TekWar	1989	William Shatner & Ron Goulart	
Temeraire	His Majesty's Dragon	2006	Naomi Novik	
Thieves' World universe	Thieves' World	1978	Robert Lynn Asprin	
The Threshold Universe	14	2012	Peter Clines	
Uglies universe	Uglies	2005	Scott Westerfeld	
Uplift Universe	Sundiver	1980	David Brin	A central feature in this universe is the process of biological uplift.
Utopia	Utopia	1516	Sir Thomas More	An idealised perfect society located somewhere in the New World
Vampire Academy universe	Vampire Academy	2007	Richelle Mead	
The Vampire Chronicles universe	Interview with the Vampire	1976	Anne Rice	
Vampire Earth	Way of the Wolf	2003	E. E. Knight	
Velgarth	Arrows of the Queen	1987	Mercedes Lackey	World infused with magic created for the 30+ volume Valdemar Saga
Videssos cycle	The Misplaced Legion	1987	Harry Turtledove	
Viriconium	The Pastel City	1971	M. John Harrison	City set in a wasteland dying Earth amid the ruins of civilisation. Setting for a number of stories.
Vorkosiverse	Shards of Honor	1986	Lois McMaster Bujold	Interstellar empire in humanity's far future that forms the setting for the Vorkosigan Saga
War Between the Provinces	Sentry Peak	2000	Harry Turtledove	
Warhammer Fantasy	Warhammer	1983	Bryan Ansell, Richard Halliwell, & Rick Priestley	Fantasy world populated by historical and phantastical cultures under threat from Chaos
Warstrider universe	Warstrider	1993	William H. Keith, Jr.	
Watches worldline	Night Watch	1998	Sergei Lukyanenko	Setting for the World of Watches series; a hidden realm in which magically empowered humans ("Others") have access to a deeper layer of reality called "The Gloom".
The Way universe	Eon	1985	Greg Bear	
Well World	Midnight at the Well of Souls	1977	Jack L. Chalker	World consisting of 1560 hexagonal regions, each with its own climate and ecosystem
Wessex	Under the Greenwood Tree	1872	Thomas Hardy	Setting of all of Hardy's major novels in the south and southwest of England. He named the area Wessex after the medieval Anglo-Saxon kingdom that existed in this part of that country prior to the Norman Conquest.
The Wheel of Time	The Eye of the World	1990	Robert Jordan	Common setting for The Wheel of Time fantasy series, that covers thousands of years of fictional history
Wild Cards Universe	Wild Cards	1987	George R. R. Martin	
William Blake's mythology	All Religions are One	1788	William Blake	Complex fictional mythology blending gnosticism, kabbalism and various forms of pre-Christian paganism
Witch World	Witch World	1963	Andre Norton	High-fantasy setting ruled by magic-using women
Wold Newton Universe	Tarzan Alive	1972	Philip Jose Farmer	Universe connecting many fictional characters from several genres, including Tarzan, Doc Savage and Sherlock Holmes, who, according to the concept, were all created via genetic mutation caused by the fall of a radioactive meteorite in Wold Newton in 1795.
Wonderland and Looking-Glass Land	Alice's Adventures in Wonderland	1865	Lewis Carroll	Nonsensical fantasy lands visited by the character Alice in the novels Alice's Adventures in Wonderland and Through the Looking-Glass and What Alice Found There
World of A Song of Ice and Fire	A Game of Thrones	1996	George R. R. Martin	Medieval-like world with years-long seasons that is the setting of the series A Song of Ice and Fire
World of The Expanse	Leviathan Wakes	2011	James S. A. Corey	Fictional version of the Solar System that is the setting for The Expanse
World of The Kingkiller Chronicle	The Name of the Wind	2007	Patrick Rothfuss	The portion of the world where most of the events take place is called the Four Corners of Civilization in the books, and the whole world has been officially named "Temerant" by Patrick Rothfuss in his blog.
World of Tiers	The Maker of Universes	1965	Philip Jose Farmer	Series of pocket universes created by an advanced, decadent humanoid race.
World of the Three Moons	Black Trillium	1990	Marion Zimmer Bradley, Julian May and Andre Norton	Fantasy world with three natural satellites that forms the setting for the Trillium series
World of The Worm Ouroboros	The Worm Ouroboros	1922	E. R. Eddison	A fictionalised version of the planet Mercury
The World State	Brave New World	1932	Aldous Huxley	Parodic utopian world in which individuality and passion are sacrificed in favor of drug-induced happiness and consumerism
World War Z universe	World War Z	2006	Max Brooks	
Worldwar universe	Worldwar: In the Balance	1994	Harry Turtledove	
The Witcher	Droga, z której się nie wraca	1990	Andrzej Sapkowski	Fantasy world. Setting of The Witcher novel series, game series and TV series.
Xanth	A Spell for Chameleon	1977	Piers Anthony	A fantasy world created for the Xanth series of novels, also known as The Magic of Xanth
Xeelee universe	Raft	1991	Stephen Baxter	Setting for the Xeelee Sequence of novels and short stories, featuring a far future galaxy colonised by the descendants of man engaged in a war with a hypertechnological race called the Xeelee.
Yoknapatawpha County	Sartoris	1929	William Faulkner	The setting for all but three of Faulkner's novels, based loosely on Lafayette County, Mississippi.
Young Wizards	So You Want to Be a Wizard	1983	Diane Duane	
Zimiamvia	Mistress of Mistresses	1935	E. R. Eddison	Shares a connection with the world of The Worm Ouroboros.
Zothique	Empire of the Necromancers	1932	Clark Ashton Smith	Mediaeval-level future continent of Earth that forms the setting for 16 short stories.

== See also ==
- List of science fiction universes
