= Superhero fiction =

Subgenre of speculative fiction

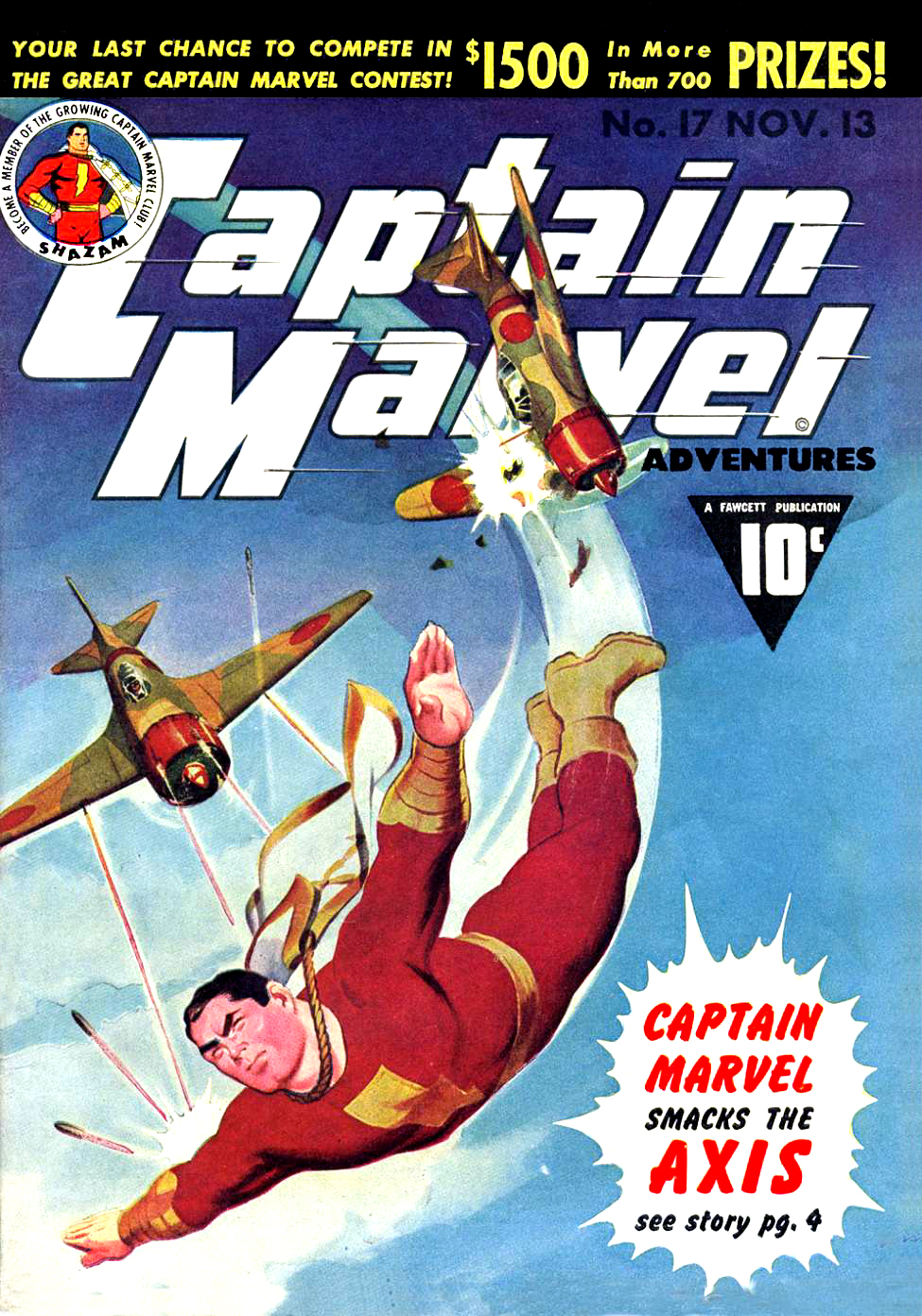
- DC Entertainment's Captain Marvel (Shazam), an iconic and influential example of the genre
- Stylistic origins: Pulp fiction, Science fiction, Adventure fiction, Crime fiction, Fantasy
- Cultural origins: United States
- Features: Adventures of heroic figures typically possessing superhuman powers or extraordinary abilities, often involving crime-fighting and battles against villains

Superhero fiction is a subgenre of speculative fiction that explores the adventures of costumed heroes, commonly known as superheroes, who often possess superhuman powers or extraordinary abilities and use them to combat crime, protect society, and confront powerful adversaries known as supervillains.

Emerging from American popular culture, superhero fiction was influenced by stories of heroic adventurers, mystery-solving detectives, and masked vigilantes in early twentieth-century American pulp magazines before becoming closely associated with comic books. The genre has since expanded into film, television, literature, animation, and video games through adaptations and original works.

== Common plot elements ==
=== Superheroes ===
A superhero is most often the protagonist of superhero fiction. However, some titles, such as Marvels by Kurt Busiek and Alex Ross, use superheroes as secondary characters. A superhero (sometimes rendered super-hero or super hero) is a type of stock character possessing "extraordinary or superhuman powers" and dedicated to protecting the public. Since the debut of the prototypical superhero Superman in 1938, stories of superheroes—ranging from brief episodic adventures to continuing years-long sagas—have dominated American comic books and crossed over into other media. The word itself dates to at least 1917. A female superhero is sometimes called a superheroine (also rendered super-heroine or super heroine). In the United States, the term "SUPER HEROES" was a registered trademark co-owned by DC Comics and Marvel Comics until 2024.

By most definitions, superheroes are not required to possess superhuman powers. Characters such as Batman and Green Arrow, who lack such powers but exhibit other defining characteristics of superheroes, are sometimes described as costumed crime fighters or masked vigilantes. During the Golden Age of Comic Books, such characters were commonly referred to as mystery men to distinguish them from heroes with superhuman abilities. Superheroes typically use their powers, skills, or specialized equipment to combat ordinary crime and confront larger threats to humanity, often posed by their villainous counterparts, known as supervillains.

Long-running superheroes such as DC's Batman, Superman and Wonder Woman and Marvel's Spider-Man, Captain America and Iron Man have a "rogues gallery" of such enemies. One of these supervillains might be the superhero's archenemy. Superheroes will sometimes combat other threats such as aliens, magical/fantasy entities, natural disasters, political ideologies such as Nazism or communism (and their proponents), and godlike or demonic creatures.

==== Discrimination against superheroes ====
Some superhero fiction portrays discrimination against superheroes, by the way of "Registration Acts", that mandate registration of superpowered individuals with the government, or laws that regulate extra-legal vigilante activity. For example, in the alternate universe of Watchmen, first published in 1986, a backlash against superheroes leads to the passage of the "Keene Act", a federal law that prohibits "costumed adventuring" except by superheroes working for the government. A similar device was used in the Marvel Comics universe in the mid-2000s, where a "Superhero Registration Act" is passed, that requires superpowered individuals to not only register with the government, but to make themselves available to be drafted to respond to emergencies.

The backlash against superheroes and metahumans in JLA: The Nail series has been compared to the real-life moral campaign against comic book superheroes in the mid-1950s.

In an essay, Ethan Faust argued that the depiction of superheroes in the 2004 film The Incredibles is used to examine societal attitudes towards those with disabilities, first by showing them through the prism of ableism in providing unwanted help to people they view as unable to help themselves, and later as those forced to hide their differences that are now an object of discrimination.

=== Supervillains ===
A supervillain (or supervillainess) is a type of villain commonly featured in comic books, action films, science fiction, and other forms of media. Supervillains frequently serve as adversaries and foils to superheroes and other heroic characters. Like superheroes, they often possess extraordinary powers or abilities that enable them to pose formidable challenges to their opponents. However, supervillains do not necessarily require physical, mystical, superhuman, or extraterrestrial powers. Those without such abilities may instead possess exceptional intelligence, advanced technological expertise, or specialized skills, allowing them to devise elaborate schemes, develop sophisticated weapons and devices, and threaten even the most powerful heroes.

Another common trait is possession of considerable resources to help further their aims. Many supervillains share some typical characteristics of real-world dictators, mobsters, mad scientists, trophy hunters, warlords, corrupt businesspeople, serial killers, and terrorists and often have aspirations of world domination or universal leadership. Superheroes and supervillains often mirror each other in their powers, abilities, or origins. In some cases, the only difference between the two is that the hero uses their extraordinary powers to help others, while the villain uses their powers for selfish, destructive, or ruthless purposes.

=== Secret identities ===
Both superheroes and supervillains often use alter egos while in action. While sometimes the character's real name is publicly known, alter egos are most often used to hide the character's secret identity from their enemies and the public.

With superheroes, the duality of their identities is kept a secret and closely guarded to protect those close to them from being harmed and to prevent them from being called upon constantly, even for problems not serious enough to require their attention. This can be a source of drama with the superhero being forced to devise means of getting out of sight to change without revealing their identity, or bearing the price of keeping such a secret. In addition, this narrative trope can allow fantasy characters to be in occasional realistic stories without the fantasy element of the sub-genre appearing.

With supervillains, by contrast, the duality of their identities is kept a secret and closely guarded to conceal their crimes from the general public, so that they may inflict greater harm on the general public, and to enable them to act freely, and hence illegally, without risk of arrest by law-enforcement authorities.

=== Death ===
Death in superhero fiction is rarely permanent, as characters who die are often brought back to life through supernatural means or via retcons (retroactive changes to the continuity), the alteration of previously established facts in the continuity of a fictional work. Fans have termed the practice of bringing back dead characters "comic book death".

One of the most "permanent" forms of death in superhero fiction occur in origin stories. Examples may include Batman's parents being murdered by a lowly crook, Spider-Man's uncle being shot by a robber he neglected to catch, and while not typically considered a superhero, The Punisher exacts vengeance on criminals for the violent killing of his family during a shootout in Central Park. These "backstory deaths" are typically permanent in main continuities, though they may appear as ghosts or visions to motivate or comfort the superhero, or in flashbacks.

Another common trait of superhero fiction is the killing off of a superhero's romantic partner by a supervillain to advance the plot. Comic book writer Gail Simone has coined the term "Women in Refrigerators" (named after an incident in Green Lantern vol. 3, #54 where Kyle Rayner's girlfriend Alex DeWitt is murdered by the supervillain Major Force and stuffed into Rayner's refrigerator) to refer to this practice.

=== Continuity ===
Many works of superhero fiction occur in a shared fictional universe, sometimes (as in the cases of the DC and Marvel Universes) establishing a fictional continuity of thousands of works that spread over many decades.

Changes to continuity are also common, ranging from small changes to established continuity, commonly called retcons, to full reboots, erasing all previous continuity.

Works of superhero fiction may also feature established characters and settings while taking place outside the main canon of their respective fictional universes.

=== Crossovers ===
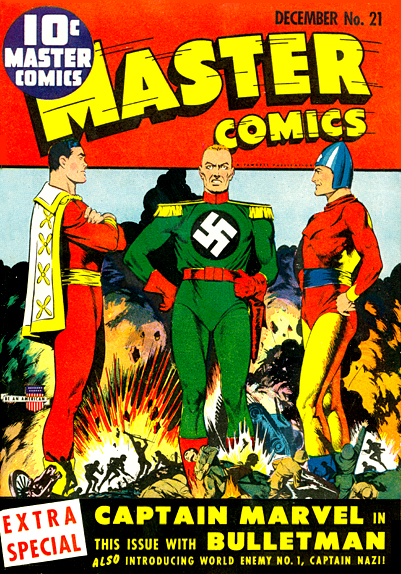
An early example of a superhero crossover: Captain Marvel and Bulletman join forces to battle Captain Nazi.

Crossovers often occur between characters of different works of superhero fiction. In comic books, highly publicized "events" are published featuring crossovers between many characters. In previous eras, especially in the Bronze Age of Comic Books, Marvel and DC had dedicated series in which their marquee characters such as Spider-Man and Superman would meet various characters in single stories such as Marvel Team-Up and DC Comics Presents. However, that publishing fashion has fallen away in favor of occasional limited series and guest appearances in regular series when the writers felt the character's presence was justified.

Intercompany crossovers, between characters of different continuity, are also common.

=== Genre flexibility ===
Over the history of the comic book genre, writers for major characters' series were required to produce material to strict regular publishing schedules that often ran for years. As such to fulfill this strenuous creative requirement, superhero stories have used a wide variety of story genres such as Fantasy, Science fiction, Mystery, Horror, Crime fiction etc. that put superhero characters in a variety and combinations of story settings and fiction tropes with their presence the major common element. As such, it has become an expected element to superhero fiction for the heroic characters to be placed in nearly any story situation, including relatively down-to-Earth drama with their personal lives out of costume.

For instance, The New Teen Titans was a mainstream superhero series which had characters that were a mix of fantasy (Raven, Wonder Girl), science fiction (Cyborg, Changeling, Starfire, Kid Flash) and crime fiction (Robin). Furthermore, their series had such a variety of stories, such as in a year-long period of 1982-3 where in rapid succession, the team would face Brother Blood, a costumed supervillain cult leader, then promptly have a space opera story where the team goes to another planet to oppose the imperial forces of Blackfire and then return to Earth only to get involved in a relatively realistic urban crime story about runaways.

== History ==
=== Prototypes ===
The first Phantom Sunday strip (May 28, 1939). Art by Ray Moore.

The mythologies of many ancient civilizations feature pantheons of gods and goddesses with superhuman powers, as well as heroes such as Hanuman, Gilgamesh, Odysseus, and David, and demigods like Heracles, and Perseus. Real life inspirations behind costumed superheroes can be traced back to the "masked vigilantes" of the American Old West such as the San Diego Vigilantes and the Bald Knobbers who fought and killed outlaws while wearing masks. The character of Spring Heeled Jack, who first emerged as an urban legend of the early 19th century, was re-conceived as a masked and costumed adventurer during the 1890s.

The hero's journey is a well-known archetypal story type in which the protagonist undertakes a quest to achieve both material advantage and psychological and ethical maturity, and is generally considered to function as a metaphor and guide for children transitioning to adulthood or from egoism to altruism as the core concept of the self. Antecedents of the superhero archetype include such folkloric heroes as Robin Hood, who adventured in distinctive clothing, and King Arthur, who possessed a supernatural weapon, Penny dreadfuls, shilling shockers, dime novels, radio programs, and other popular fiction of the late 19th and early 20th centuries featured mysterious, swashbuckling heroes with distinct costumes, unusual abilities and altruistic missions. The 1903 play The Scarlet Pimpernel and its spinoffs further popularized the idea of a masked avenger and the superhero trope of a secret identity; such characters as the Green Hornet and the Scarecrow of Romney Marsh, would follow. Likewise, the science-fiction heroes L'Oiselle, John Carter of Mars, Buck Rogers, Flash Gordon and Lensman, with their futuristic weapons and gadgets; Tarzan, with his high degree of athleticism and strength, and his ability to communicate with animals; Robert E. Howard's Conan the Barbarian, the biologically modified Hugo Danner of the novel Gladiator, and Aarn Munro of The Mightiest Machine, who gained superhuman abilities from Jupiter's intense gravity, were heroes with unusual abilities who fought sometimes larger-than-life foes. The word "superhero" itself dates to at least 1917.

Pecos Bill, created by Tex O'Reilly in 1923, also embodied proto-superheroic qualities. Raised by coyotes after being lost as a child, Bill grew into a larger-than-life cowboy capable of taming tornadoes, riding wild beasts, and performing impossible feats across the frontier.

The most direct antecedents are pulp magazine film serials crime fighters.

Nyctalope (1911), created by the French Jean de La Hire, revolutionized the concept of heroes by introducing Léo Saint-Clair, a scientifically enhanced character with superhuman night vision and an artificial heart, considered one of literature's first cyborgs and a precursor to technologically empowered heroes. As a response to the villainy of Fantômas (1911), created by Marcel Allain and Pierre Souvestre, Judex debuted in 1916 in a French silent serial of same name by Louis Feuillade. A cloaked avenger with a secret lair, dual identity, and strong moral mission. That same year, Ravengar appeared in The Shielding Shadow, a French-American serial directly inspired by Judex. Also a shadowy figure driven by justice, Ravengar reinforced the model of the mysterious masked vigilante. Both characters predated The Shadow (1930), who refined the archetype with hypnotic powers and a terrifying presence. His visual style recalls Judex, while his power of invisibility echoes Ravengar. Other characters include the masked Zorro (introduced by Johnston M. McCulley in 1919 with The Curse of Capistrano) with his trademark "Z", the technologically advanced "Black Sapper" (1929). The winged hero Night Hawk (1930), published in The Nelson Lee Library, written by John James Brearley Garbutt. Thurston Kyle, was a scientific detective and inventor who devised winged apparatus that allowed him to fly, the "peak human" Doc Savage (1933), and The Spider (1933), and comic strip characters such as Hugo Hercules (1902), Popeye (1929), Mandrake the Magician (1934), Magic Phantom (1935), the Phantom (1936) and Olga Mesmer (1937). Created by Lee Falk, both Mandrake (1934) and The Phantom (1936) pioneered essential genre conventions. Mandrake showcased extraordinary abilities, initially portrayed as genuine magic but later explained as hypnotism. The Phantom introducing two groundbreaking elements, the blank-eyed mask (with completely white eyes) and the skintight costume.

Like Nick Carter, also published by Street & Smith, and Henry Stone from Philip Wylie's The Savage Gentleman (1932), Doc Savage was shaped by his father to become physically and intellectually superior. While Nick and Doc embraced heroic paths, Henry turned inward, facing personal and existential struggles rather than fighting crime. Philip Wylie, author of Gladiator and The Savage Gentleman, also co-wrote When Worlds Collide (1933) with Edwin Balmer, a story of rogue planets on a collision course with Earth that is said to have inspired Flash Gordon.

The first masked crime-fighter created for comic books was writer-artist George Brenner's non-superpowered detective the Clock, who debuted in Centaur Publications' Funny Pages #6 (Nov. 1936). In August 1937, in a letter column of the pulp magazine Thrilling Wonder Stories, the word superhero was used to define the title character of the comic strip Zarnak by Max Plaisted. Historians point to the first appearance of Superman, created by Jerome "Jerry" Siegel and designed by Joseph "Joe" Shuster, in Action Comics #1 (June 1938) as the debut of the comic-book archetype of the superhero.

Outside the American comics industry, superpowered, costumed superheroes, such as Ōgon Bat (1931) was visualized in painted panels used by kamishibai oral storytellers in Japan. Anticipated elements of Superman and Batman. An earlier example from Japan is Sarutobi Sasuke, a superhero ninja from Japanese the Japanese folklore and children's novels in the 1910s. By 1914, his abilities included superhuman strength, chanting incantations, appearing and disappearing, jumping to the top of the highest trees, riding on clouds, conjuring the elements (water, fire and wind), and transforming into other people or animals.

=== Golden Age ===
In 1938, writer Jerry Siegel and artist Joe Shuster, who had previously worked in pulp science fiction magazines, introduced Superman. (Siegel, as the writer, actually created the central and supporting characters; Shuster, as the artist, designed these characters, and gave Superman the first version of his now-iconic uniform.) The character possessed many of the traits that have come to define the superhero: a secret identity, superhuman powers and a colorful costume including a symbol and cape. His name is also the source of the term "superhero", although early comic book heroes were sometimes also called mystery men or masked heroes.

DC Comics, which published under the names National and All-American at the time, received an overwhelming response to Superman and, in the years that followed, introduced Batman, Wonder Woman, The Green Lantern, The Flash, The Hawkman, Aquaman, and The Green Arrow. The first team of superheroes was DC's Justice Society of America, featuring most of the aforementioned characters. Although DC dominated the superhero market at this time, companies large and small created hundreds of superheroes. The Human Torch of the Golden Age and the Sub-Mariner, from Marvel Comics (then called Timely Comics and later re-branded Atlas Comics), and Plastic Man and Phantom Lady from Quality Comics were also hits. Will Eisner's The Spirit, featured in a comic strip, would become a considerable artistic inspiration to later comic book creators. The era's most popular superhero, however, was Fawcett Comics's Captain Marvel (Now known under DC's trademark, Shazam!), whose exploits regularly outsold those of Superman during the 1940s. When Fawcett Comics went out of business as such, DC Comics, which had been embroiled in a bitter copyright dispute with Fawcett Comics over Captain Marvel, bought out the copyright to not only the character but also his ancillary "Marvel Family" of heroes and villains.

During World War II, superheroes grew in popularity, surviving paper rationing and the loss of many writers and illustrators to service in the armed forces. The need for simple tales of good triumphing over evil may explain the wartime popularity of superheroes. Publishers responded with stories in which superheroes battled the Axis powers and the patriotically themed superheroes, most notably Marvel's Captain America as well as DC's Wonder Woman.

Like other pop-culture figures of the time, Superheroes were used to promote domestic propaganda during wartime, ranging from the purchasing of war bonds.

Following superheroes's popularity during this time, those characters' appeal began to dwindle in the post-war era. Comic-book publishers, casting about for new subjects and genres, found success in, particularly, crime fiction, the most prominent comic of which was Lev Gleason Publications's Crime Does Not Pay, and horror. The lurid nature of these genres sparked a moral crusade in which comics were blamed for juvenile delinquency and the United States Senate Subcommittee on Juvenile Delinquency began. The movement was spearheaded by psychiatrist Fredric Wertham, who argued in Seduction of the Innocent, that "deviant" sexual undertones ran rampant in superhero comics. In 2012, his methodology was reviewed and his results were found to be misleading if not falsified. This environment of censorship and shrinking sales led to the closure of several comic book publishers, with some companies completely abandoning the comics market. One significant consequence of this period was that many characters and comic series fell into the public domain, largely due to the failure to renew their copyrights. Under U.S. law at the time, publishers were required to renew their copyrights after 28 years.

In response, the comic book industry adopted the stringent Comics Code. By the mid-1950s, only Superman, Batman and Wonder Woman retained a sliver of their prior popularity, although effort towards complete inoffensiveness led to stories that many consider silly, especially by modern standards. This ended what historians have called the Golden Age of comic books.

=== Silver Age ===
In the 1950s, DC Comics, under the editorship of Julius Schwartz, recreated many popular 1940s heroes, launching an era later deemed the Silver Age of comic books. The Flash, Green Lantern, Hawkman and several others were recreated with new origin stories. While past superheroes resembled mythological heroes in their origins and abilities, these heroes were inspired by contemporary science fiction. In 1960, DC banded its most popular heroes together in the Justice League of America, which became a sales phenomenon.

Empowered by the return of the superhero at DC, Marvel Comics editor/writer Stan Lee and the artists/co-writers Jack Kirby, Steve Ditko and Bill Everett launched a new line of superhero comic books, beginning with the Fantastic Four in 1961 and continuing with the Incredible Hulk, Spider-Man, Iron Man, Thor, the X-Men, and Daredevil. These comics continued DC's use of science fiction concepts (radiation was a common source of superpowers) but placed greater emphasis on personal conflict and character development. This led to many superheroes that differed from predecessors with more dramatic potential. For example, the Fantastic Four were a superhero family of sorts, who squabbled and even held some unresolved acrimony towards one another, and Spider-Man was a teenager who struggled to earn money and maintain his social life in addition to his costumed exploits.

== In non-comics media ==
=== Film ===
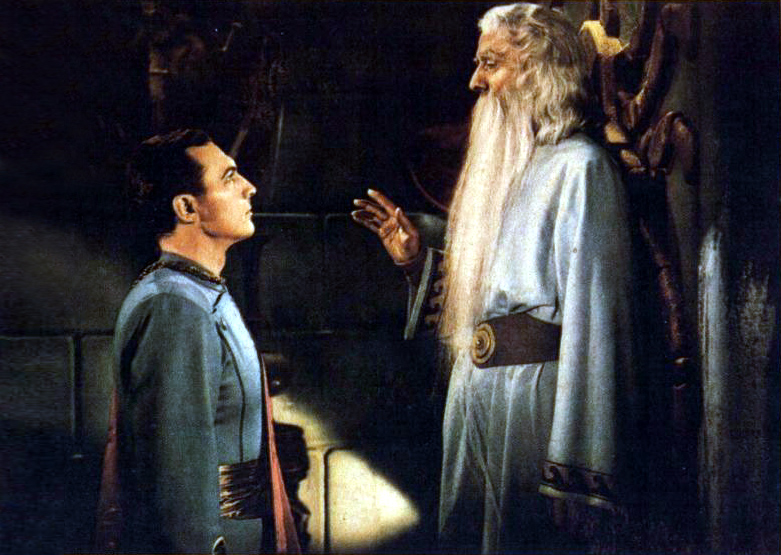
The 1941 film Adventures of Captain Marvel, Republic Pictures

Superhero films began as Saturday movie serials aimed at children during the 1940s with the first film adaptation of a comic book superhero being The Adventures of Captain Marvel in 1941. The decline of these serials meant the death of superhero films until the release of 1978's Superman, a critical and commercial success. Several sequels followed in the 1980s. 1989's Batman was also highly successful and followed by several sequels in the 1990s. Yet while both franchises were initially successful, later sequels in both series fared poorly both artistically and financially, stunting the growth of superhero films for a time.

Hit films such as 1998's Blade, 2000's X-Men and Unbreakable, and 2002's Spider-Man have led to sequel installments as well as encouraging the development of numerous superhero film franchises in the 21st century, both successful (such as 2005's Batman Begins, a reboot of the Batman film series) and unsuccessful (such as 2004's Catwoman). With that resurgence, the subgenre has become a major element of mainstream film production with outstanding successes like 2008's The Dark Knight, 2012's The Avengers and The Dark Knight Rises, 2013's Iron Man 3, and 2015's Avengers: Age of Ultron attracting major revenue and critical plaudits. This trend was reinforced in 2016 with the outstanding success of the critically lauded Deadpool, a film adaptation of a relatively minor Marvel Comics character that premiered at over $100 million in February, a time of year generally considered poor for movie audience interest. It was an observation further confirmed in 2018 when Black Panther was an even grander success with a $235 million debut in the same time of year, and later became the first superhero film to be nominated for the Academy Award for Best Picture. Avengers: Endgame became the highest-grossing film of all time. In 2017, the film Sign Gene featured about deaf superheroes who use sign language.

=== Live-action television series ===
Several live-action superhero programs aired from the early 1950s until the late 1970s. These included Adventures of Superman starring George Reeves, the action-comedy Batman series of the 1960s (often interpreted as being campy) starring Adam West and Burt Ward. In the 1970s however, the genre would find a newfound credibility in the medium with the original series, The Six Million Dollar Man and its spinoff, The Bionic Woman, being sustained successes. This led to direct adaptations of comic-book superheroes such as ABC/CBS drama series Wonder Woman of the 1970s starring Lynda Carter. The Incredible Hulk of the late 1970s and early 1980s, however, had a more somber tone. Superboy ran from 1988 to 1992 in syndication. In the 1990s, the Power Rangers, adapted from the Japanese Super Sentai, became popular. Other shows targeting teenage and young adult audiences that decade included Lois and Clark: The New Adventures of Superman. In 2001, Smallville retooled Superman's origin as a teen drama. The 2006 NBC series Heroes tells the story of several ordinary people who each suddenly find themselves with a superpower. The British series Misfits incorporates super-human abilities to undesirables in society. In this case, young offenders put on community service all have super powers and each use them to battle villains of sorts. In the 1980s, an unsuccessful attempt was made to realize this last concept in the United States with the short-lived action comedy, Misfits of Science. In the 2010s, Warner Brothers created a successful adaptation of the Green Arrow, Arrow, that began the successful Arrowverse television franchise. Marvel meanwhile had a successful television spin-off of their Marvel Cinematic Universe franchise Agents of S.H.I.E.L.D., while creating a number of series on the streaming service Netflix, before moving the bulk of their properties to the copyright owner's, Disney, to its own streaming service, Disney+. DC series include Shazam!, The Secrets of Isis, The Flash (1990 TV series), Birds of Prey and Gotham. Arrowverse series include The Flash (2014 TV series), Supergirl, Legends of Tomorrow and Constantine. Marvel series include The Amazing Spider-Man, Spidey Super Stories and Mutant X. Netflix series include Daredevil, Jessica Jones, Luke Cage, Iron Fist and The Defenders.Japanese tokusatsu series include Ultraman, Spectreman and Kamen Rider. Other series include- Buffy the Vampire Slayer, Angel, The Phantom Captain Nice, Mr. Terrific, The Green Hornet, Electra Woman and Dyna Girl, The Greatest American Hero, Dark Angel, No Ordinary Family, Alias and The Boys franchise.

=== Animation ===
In the 1940s, Fleischer/Famous Studios produced a number of groundbreaking Superman cartoons, which became the first examples of superhero fiction in animation. Since the 1960s, superhero cartoons have been a staple of children's television, particularly in the U.S.. However, by the early 1970s, US broadcasting restrictions on violence in children's entertainment led to series that were extremely tame, a trend exemplified by the series Super Friends. Meanwhile, Japan's anime industry successfully contributed its own style of superhero series, such as Science Ninja Team Gatchaman.

In the 1980s, the Saturday morning cartoon Spider-Man and His Amazing Friends brought together Spider-Man, Iceman, and Firestar. The following decade, Batman: The Animated Series, which was aimed at somewhat older audiences, found critical success in mainstream publications. This series led to the successful DC Animated Universe franchise and other adaptations such as Teen Titans, which Marvel emulated with X-Men and Spider-Man: The Animated Series.

Superhero mythos in comics itself received a nostalgic treatment in the 2004 Disney/Pixar release The Incredibles, which utilized computer animation. Original superheroes with basis in older trends have also been made for television, such as Disney's Gargoyles by Greg Weisman and Cartoon Network's Ben 10 franchise and Nickelodeon's Danny Phantom.

=== Radio ===
Beginning 1940s, the radio serial Superman starred Bud Collyer as the titular hero. Fellow DC Comics stars Batman and Robin made occasional guest appearances. Other superhero radio programs starred characters including the costumed but not superpowered Blue Beetle, and the non-costumed, superpowered Popeye. Also appearing on radio were such characters as the Green Hornet, the Green Lama, Doc Savage, and the Lone Ranger, a Western hero who relied on many conventions of the superhero archetype.

=== Literature ===
==== Adaptations ====
Superheroes occasionally have been adapted into prose fiction, starting with Random House's 1942 novel The Adventures of Superman by George Lowther. In the 1970s, Elliot S! Maggin wrote the Superman novels, Last Son of Krypton (1978) and Miracle Monday, coinciding with but not adapting the movie Superman. Other early adaptations include novels starring the comic-strip hero The Phantom, starting with 1943's Son of the Phantom. The character likewise returned in 1970s books, with a 15-installment series from Avon Books beginning in 1972, written by Phantom creator Lee Falk, Ron Goulart, and others.

Also during the 1970s, Pocket Books published 11 novels based on Marvel Comics characters. Juvenile novels featuring Marvel Comics and DC Comics characters including Batman, Spider-Man, the X-Men, and the Justice League, have been published, often marketed in association with TV series, as have Big Little Books starring the Fantastic Four and others.

In the 1990s and 2000s, Marvel and DC released novels adapting such story arcs as "The Death of Superman", "Planet Hulk", "Wonder Woman: Earth One", "Spider-Man: Birth of Venom" and Batman's "No Man's Land".

==== Original ====
Original superhero or superhuman fiction has appeared in both novel and short story print forms unrelated to adaptations from the major comic-book companies. It has also appeared in poetry.

Print magazines devoted to such stories include A Thousand Faces: A Quarterly Journal of Superhuman Fiction, published since 2007 in print and electronic form, and online only as of 2011 and This Mutant Life: Superhero Fiction, a bimonthly print publication from Australia, published since 2010. The latter magazine was one of the few to also publish superhero poetry, ceasing to do so as of 2011. Superhero poems there included Philip L. Tite's "Brittle Lives", Mark Floyd's "Nemeses", and Jay Macleod's "All Our Children".

Novels with original superhuman stories include Robert Mayer's Superfolks (St. Martin's Griffin, March 9, 2005); James Maxey's Nobody Gets the Girl (Phobos Books, 2003); Rob Rogers's Devil's Cape (Wizards of the Coast Discoveries imprint, 2008); Austin Grossman's Soon I Will Be Invincible (Pantheon Books, 2007); Lavie Tidhar's The Violent Century (Hodder & Stoughton, 2013), David J. Schwartz's Superpowers: A Novel (Three Rivers Press, 2008); Matthew Cody's Powerless (Knopf, 2009); Van Allen Plexico's Sentinels series of superhero novels (Swarm/Permuted Press, beginning in 2008); Marissa Meyer's Renegades trilogy; and Ben Langdon's The Miranda Contract and The Adventures of Charlie Conti, both set in the same shared Uberworld Universe. Collections of superhuman short stories include Who Can Save Us Now?: Brand-New Superheroes and Their Amazing (Short) Stories, edited by Owen King and John McNally (Free Press, 2008), and Masked, edited by Lou Anders (Gallery, 2010). With the rise of e-book readers like Kindle and Nook, a host of superhero stories have been self-published, including R. R. Haywood's Extracted (2017), R. T. Leone's Invinciman (2017), and Mike Vago's Selfdestructible (2018).

=== Video games ===
While many popular superheroes have been featured in licensed video games, up until recently there have been few that have revolved around heroes created specifically for the game. This has changed due to popular franchises: The Silver Age-inspired Freedom Force (2002), City of Heroes (2004), Infamous series and Champions Online (2009), a massively multiplayer online role-playing game (or MMORPG), all of which allow players to create their own superheroes and/or villains.

=== Internet ===
In the 1980s and 1990s, the Internet allowed a worldwide community of fans and amateur writers to bring their own superhero creations to a global audience. The first original major shared superhero universe to develop on the Internet was Superguy, which first appeared on a UMNEWS mailing list in 1989. In 1992, a cascade on the USENET newsgroup rec.arts.comics would give birth to the Legion of Net. Heroes shared universe. In 1994, LNH writers contributed to the creation of the newsgroup rec.arts.comics.creative, which spawned a number of original superhero shared universes.

Magazine-style websites that publish superhero fiction include Metahuman Press, active since 2005, and Freedom Fiction Journal. Superhuman fiction has also appeared in general science fiction/speculative fiction web publications, such as the weekly Strange Horizons, a publication that pays its contributors. Two examples there are Paul Melko's "Doctor Mighty and the Case of Ennui" and Saladin Ahmed's "Doctor Diablo Goes Through the Motions".

The web serial Worm began publication in 2011 and completed in 2013 while its sequel, Ward, began in November 2017 and completed in May 2020.

== Outside the United States ==
There have been successful superhero works in other countries most of whom share the conventions of the American model. Examples include Cybersix from Argentina, Captain Canuck from Canada, and the heroes of AK Comics from Egypt. The earlier of these wore scarves either in addition to or as a substitute for capes and many wear helmets instead of masks.

=== Japan ===
Japanese superheroes date back to the 1930s, when some of the earliest superpowered costumed heroes appeared in Japan's kamishibai, a form of street theater where scenes are visualized in painted panels used by oral storytellers. Popular examples of kamishibai superheroes include Ōgon Bat, who debuted in 1931, anticipated several superhero fiction elements and superpowers that later appeared among American comic superheroes such as Superman (1938 debut) and Batman (1939 debut).

The iconic manga series Astro Boy (1952–1968) by Osamu Tezuka is considered to be the first superhero of Japanese manga and anime, and considered to be one of the most influential works in the medium to date. The character of Astro Boy (Atom) himself is sometimes considered the manga equivalent to Superman, due to the influence and popularity of the character and the series.

Additionally, Moonlight Mask, Ultraman, Kamen Rider, Super Sentai (the basis for Power Rangers), Metal Hero Series and Kikaider have become popular in Japanese tokusatsu live-action shows, and Science Ninja Team Gatchaman, Casshern, Devilman, Dragon Ball, The Guyver, One-Punch Man, My Hero Academia and Sailor Moon are popular series of Japanese anime and manga. Japanese manga that target female readers include varieties such as "magical girl" (e.g. Sailor Moon and Cardcaptor Sakura).

=== Other countries ===
In 1947, Filipino writer/cartoonist Mars Ravelo introduced the Asian superheroine Darna, a young Filipina country girl who found a mystic talisman-pebble from another planet that allows her to transform into an adult warrior-woman. She appeared in her own feature-length motion picture in 1951 and has become a cultural institution in the Philippines.

British superheroes began appearing in the Golden Age shortly after the first American heroes became popular in the UK. Most original British heroes were confined to anthology comics magazines such as Lion, Valiant, Warrior, and 2000 AD. Marvelman, known as Miracleman in North America, is an original British superhero (although he was based heavily on Captain Marvel). Popular in the 1960s, British readers grew fond of him and contemporary UK comics writers Alan Moore and Neil Gaiman revived Marvelman in series that reinvented the characters in a more serious vein, an attitude prevalent in newer British heroes, such as Zenith. Judge Dredd is also a well known British comics character.

In France, where comics are known as bande dessinée (literally "drawn strip") and regarded as a proper art form, Éditions Lug began translating and publishing Marvel comic books in anthology magazines in 1969. Soon, Lug started presenting its own heroes alongside Marvel stories. Some closely modeled their U.S. counterparts (such as the trio of Harvard entomologists-Olympic athletes—Mikros, Saltarella and Crabb—of the S.H.I.E.L.D.-esque saga of C.L.A.S.H.), while others included the shape-changing alien Wampus. Many were short-lived, while others rivaled their inspirations in longevity and have been the subject of reprints and revivals.

In the late 1980s, Raj Comics introduced the superhero genre in India and in the process became one of the biggest comics publishing house in India. The Raj comics universe is home to many Indian superheroes, most notable among them being Nagraj, Super Commando Dhruva and Doga. Indian superheroes have also made their presence felt in other media including television and movies over the years. Notable among these are Shaktimaan, Mr. India, Krrish, Chitti and G.One.

In 1954, Brazilian filmmaker Rubem Biáfora introduced Capitão 7 (Captain 7), the first Brazilian superhero (described as a mix of Superman, Captain Marvel and a "dash" of Flash Gordon), in a television series for TV Record, later the superhero was adapted into comics as well.

On Middle East Kuwait-based company Teshkeel Comics after translating American comics also published an original superhero comic book series, The 99. The 99 debuted in May 2006, and continued to be published until September 2013. Teshkeel published The 99 in English, Arabic, and Indonesian, among other languages. The 99 was distributed in North America via Diamond Comic Distributors.

Cat Claw is a superheroine co-created by a pair of Serbian comic artists and writers.

Biały Orzeł (White Eagle) is a Polish mainstream superhero created by brothers Adam and Maciej Kmiołek (and colored by Rex Lokus who also working for DC and Marvel). Earlier attempts of introduction superhero convention in Poland includes Leopold Tyrmand's novel Zły - also known as The Man With White Eyes, Andrzej Kondratiuk's parodistic movie Hydrozagadka about Superman's-spoof As (Ace), Bond-esque cosmic superspy Tajfun (Typhoon) created by Tadeusz Raczkiewicz, and cult following underground punk Likwidator (Liquidator) by Ryszard Dąbrowski, about anti-hero ecoterrorist anarchist vigilante comparable to Lobo and The Punisher.

Malaysia also created a few notable superheroes, such as Keluang Man (who is very similar to Batman and appeared in his own animation series), and Cicak-Man (who has appeared in two successful comedic superhero films).

In Australia, the print magazine This Mutant Life: Superhero Fiction was launched by editor Ben Langdon as a bi-monthly to publish prose and some poetry (it discontinued accepting poetry in 2011) of original superhuman fiction.
