= List of science fiction universes =

Several fictional universes exist in science fiction that serve as backstage for novels, short stories, motion pictures and games. This list includes:

- The Æon Flux universe by Peter Chung
- The Alien Nation universe by Rockne S. O'Bannon
- The Alliance-Union universe by C. J. Cherryh
- The Avatar universe by James Cameron
- The BattleTech universe, originally created by Jordan Weisman and Patrick Larkin and fleshed out by a multitude of other authors including Michael A. Stackpole, William H. Keith Jr., Blaine Lee Pardoe, and Loren L. Coleman
- The Battlestar Galactica universe by Glen A. Larson
- The Blade Runner universe by Philip K. Dick
- The Bolo universe by Keith Laumer
- The Cloverfield universe by J. J. Abrams
- The CoDominium universe by Jerry Pournelle
- The Culture universe by Iain M. Banks
- The Dead Space universe by Glen Schofield
- The Whoniverse co-created with Sydney Newman, Verity Lambert, Mervyn Pinfield, Anthony Coburn and C.E. Webber, among others
- The Dune universe by Frank Herbert
- The Eight Worlds universe by John Varley
- The Enderverse by Orson Scott Card
- The Enthiran universe by S. Shankar
- The Expanse universe by James S. A. Corey
- The Firefly universe by Joss Whedon
- The Foundation universe of the Robot–Empire–Foundation series by Isaac Asimov
- The Gaean Reach universe by Jack Vance
- The Galactic Center Saga universe by Gregory Benford
- The Halo universe by Bungie
- The Heechee universe by Frederik Pohl
- The Hitchhiker's Guide to the Galaxy universe by Douglas Adams
- The Honorverse by David Weber
- The Humanx Commonwealth universe by Alan Dean Foster
- The Hyperion universe by Dan Simmons
- The Independence Day universe by Roland Emmerich and Dean Devlin
- The Instrumentality of Mankind universe by Cordwainer Smith
- Isaac's Universe by Isaac Asimov
- The Known Space universe by Larry Niven
- The Legend of the Galactic Heroes universe by Yoshiki Tanaka
- The Liaden universe by Sharon Lee and Steve Miller
- The Macross universe by Studio Nue and Artland
- The Mass Effect universe by BioWare
- The Men in Black universe by Lowell Cunningham
- The Noon universe by Arkady and Boris Strugatsky
- The Old Man's War universe by John Scalzi
- The Orion's Arm universe by M. Alan Kazlev, Donna Malcolm Hirsekorn, Bernd Helfert and Anders Sandberg
- The Outlaw Star universe by Sunrise
- The Planet of the Apes universe by Pierre Boulle
- The Perry Rhodan universe by Karl-Herbert Scheer and Clark Darlton
- The Red Rising universe by Pierce Brown
- The Revelation Space universe by Alastair Reynolds
- The Rifts Megaverse by Kevin Siembieda
- The Saga of the Skolian Empire universe by Catherine Asaro
- The Sector General universe by James White
- The Skyline universe by Joshua Cordes and Liam O'Donnell
- The Space Odyssey universe by Arthur C. Clarke
- The Starcraft universe by Blizzard Entertainment
- The Stargate universe by Brad Wright and Jonathan Glassner
- The Starship Troopers universe by Robert A. Heinlein
- The Star Trek universe by Gene Roddenberry
- The Sun Eater universe by Christopher Ruocchio
- The Tekwar universe by William Shatner
- The Traveller universe by Game Designers' Workshop
- The Uplift universe by David Brin
- The Vorkosigan Saga universe by Lois McMaster Bujold
- The Wayfarers universe by Becky Chambers
- The X-COM universe by Mythos Games and MicroProse
- The X-Files universe by Chris Carter
- The Xeelee universe by Stephen Baxter
- The Zones of Thought universe by Vernor Vinge

Some universes also include elements from other genres of speculative fiction such as fantasy or horror.

- The Cosmere by Brandon Sanderson
- The Star Wars universe by George Lucas (space opera with some J. R. R. Tolkien influences)
- The Warhammer 40,000 universe by Games Workshop
- Bas-Lag by China Miéville

== See also ==
- Galactic empire
- List of fictional universes in literature
- List of galactic communities
