= List of Fear Street books =

First edition cover of The New Girl, the first Fear Street book

This is a list of books from the Fear Street book series created and written by R. L. Stine. The first book, The New Girl, was published in 1989. Various spin-off series were written, including the Fear Street Sagas and Ghosts of Fear Street. More than 80 million Fear Street books have been sold as of 2003. The books appeared in many bestseller lists, including The New York Times Best Seller list for children, USA Today bestseller list and Publishers Weekly bestseller list, and the series was listed as the bestselling young-adult book series of all time.

== Original Fear Street series ==
#	Title	ISBN
01	The New Girl	0-671-74649-9
Cory falls in love with Anna, the mysterious new girl at school, but his friends never see her, and when he looks her up, her family name is not listed. Cory decides to investigate about whether Anna is real or not, but also to find out if something sinister is going on.
02	The Surprise Party	0-671-73561-6
A year after one friend died and another moved away, Meg decides to throw a surprise party for Ellen when she returns for a visit. Soon, she starts getting eerie calls, threats, and acts of violence, all with one message: "Cancel the party... or else".
03	The Overnight	0-671-74650-2
Della O'Connor and her fellow Outdoors Club members are being stalked by someone.
04	Missing	0-671-69410-3
After their parents go missing, Mark and Cara Burroughs begin to notice strange happenings around them and later the real terror begins.
05	The Wrong Number	0-671-69411-1
Deena and Jade learn the consequences of prank calls when Deena's half brother, Chuck, dials a wrong number and catches the attention of a murderer.
06	The Sleepwalker	0-671-74652-9
Mayra Barnes suspects that her new boss, old Mrs. Cottler, may be a witch and has cast a spell on her to make Mayra sleepwalk, leading her into increasing peril.
07	Haunted	0-671-74651-0
Melissa, scared by reports of a neighbourhood prowler, is tormented by a menacing figure in her bedroom.
08	Halloween Party	0-671-70243-2
The scares at a Halloween party turn real when someone is murdered.
09	The Stepsister	0-671-70244-0
Emily, struggling to fall in love with her new stepsister Jessie, finds out a horrifying secret in Jessie's diary.
10	Ski Weekend	0-671-72480-0
Best friends Ariel Munroe, Doug Mahr and Shannon Harper become stranded in a blizzard and are saved by a strange man named Red, who guides them to a hilltop ski resort. When they come to the resort, however, their hosts are acting very sinister. Doug's car is gone, the phones are dead, and the house is full of guns. Then a shot is fired and the real terror begins.
11	The Fire Game	0-671-72481-9
Gabe, a teenager new to Shadyside, goads the other neighbourhood kids into proving their courage by starting fires.
12	Lights Out	0-671-72482-7
While working at Camp Nightwing, junior counselor Holly Flynn finds her fellow counselors being murdered.
13	The Secret Bedroom	0-671-72483-5
There is a barricaded room in Lea's new house. Someone had been murdered in that room, and it had not been used ever since. Lea also hears a footsteps coming from that room.
14	The Knife	0-671-72484-3
Every private room at Shadyside Hospital holds a shocking secret of its own. Student volunteer Laurie stumbles onto the hospital's sickest secret of all.
15	The Prom Queen	0-671-72485-1
Lizzie McVay was so excited to be nominated Prom Queen, but when the other candidates are murdered, Lizzie must uncover the killer's identity before it is too late.
16	First Date	0-671-73865-8
Shy, lonely Chelsea is asked out by two new boys in town, but one of them is a crazed killer.
17	The Best Friend	0-671-73866-6
Becka Norwood's life is turned upside down when a new girl named Honey starts claiming to be her best friend. It later becomes clear how far Honey will go to make that illusion a reality.
18	The Cheater	0-671-73867-4
Desperate to pass math, Carter Phillips convinces math wiz Adam to take a test for her in exchange for one date.
19	Sunburn	0-671-73868-2
While at her friend Marla's beach house for the weekend, Claudia believes a series of fatal accidents are actually murders.
20	The New Boy	0-671-73869-0
Janie and her friends make bets on which of them will date hunky, mysterious Ross first, but then the murders begin.
21	The Dare	0-671-73870-4
Johanna Wise would do anything to date Dennis and be a part of his popular clique, but is apparently capable to commit a murder.
22	Bad Dreams	0-671-78569-9
Maggie is plagued by the same dream of a murder each night, leaving her afraid to sleep, but soon the terrifying dream starts to become a reality.
23	Double Date	0-671-78570-2
Bobby is a heartbreaker, and sets his sights on the Wade twins, bragging they will both fall for him. They do, but one of them is murderously jealous.
24	The Thrill Club	0-671-78581-8
Talia's friends love hearing her horror stories until they become real.
25	One Evil Summer	0-671-78596-6
Chrissy seemed like the perfect babysitter, but unbeknownst to the Conklin family, Chrissy has a secret agenda.
26	The Mind Reader	0-671-78600-8
Ellie is haunted by ghostly visions that lead her to a girl's body, and along the trail of the girl's killer.
27	Wrong Number 2	0-671-78607-5
Deena and Jade's wrong number from the previous year comes back to haunt them.
28	Truth or Dare	0-671-86836-5
Seven friends, stuck in a luxury ski condo, play a game of truth or dare, but the game turns deadly when one of them would rather kill than tell the truth.
29	Dead End	0-671-86837-3
Natalie and her friends were all in the car that night when someone died at the dead end. Now someone will do anything to keep that secret buried.
30	Final Grade	0-671-86838-1
Lily Bancroft lives to win but when her rival is brutally murdered, she is drawn into a nightmare that she cannot control it.
31	Switched	0-671-86839-X
Nicole thinks that her friend Lucy's life is much better than hers. When Lucy asks her if she wants to switch bodies, Nicole thinks to be a fun idea. The switch soon works, but she does not know that Lucy's life is not all that sweet after all.
32	College Weekend	0-671-86840-3
High school student Tina arrives at Patterson College to spend the weekend with her boyfriend Josh, but soon notices that he is missing and that his friends are clearly hiding something.
33	The Stepsister 2	0-671-89426-9
Emily's sister Nancy is returning home after being declared sane, but their troubled past soon haunts them.
34	What Holly Heard	0-671-89427-7
Holly learned a terrible secret, and now her friends know it too. Someone wants to make sure they never talk about it.
35	The Face	0-671-89428-5
Martha begins drawing the face of a boy she does not recall seeing. As if against her will, she ends up drawing the face over and over again.
36	Secret Admirer	0-671-89429-3
Selena is on top of the world and her acting career at Shadyside High goes well, until she starts getting messages from someone posing as "The Sun" and accidents start happening.
37	The Perfect Date	0-671-89430-7
After his girlfriend's gruesome death in a sledding accident, Brady is ready to move on. He meets a girl named Rosha and she seems like the perfect girl, but he later learns that she could be a nightmare.
38	The Confession	0-671-89431-5
After one of her friends confesses to a murder, Julie decides to keep his secret, but that incident does not go away without consequences.
39	The Boy Next Door	0-671-89432-3
Lynne and Crystal would do anything to go out with Scott, Crystal's new neighbor, but they soon discover that Scott's last girlfriend is dead.
40	Night Games	0-671-52958-7
Diane and her friends love to go out late at night and play pranks, until someone dies. Soon they are all pulled into a nightmare beyond their control.
41	Runaway	0-671-52959-5
Hoping to escape her dark past, Felicia moves to Shadyside. All seems well there until someone discovers her secret.
42	Killer's Kiss	0-671-52960-9
Delia and Karina would do anything to date Vincent, but one of them wants to kill him.
43	All-Night Party	0-671-52961-7
For Cindy's birthday, her friends take her to Fear Island for a party, bur when Cindy is murdered, the friends are pulled into a nightmare.
44	The Rich Girl	0-671-52962-5
After discovering a bag full of money, Emma and Sydney decide to keep it a secret, but when Sydney tells her boyfriend Jason about it, Emma is scared.
45	Cat	0-671-52963-3
After accidentally killing a cat that lived in the school gym, Marty is sentenced to community service. He is later chased by cats wherever he goes and the cats apparently want a revenge on him.
46	Fear Hall: The Beginning	0-671-00874-9
Hope has got this terribly sick boyfriend who basically kills everything that touches her, but in the end, not everything is as it seems.
47	Fear Hall: The Conclusion	0-671-00875-7
Hope hides in an abandoned sorority house where she discovers that the evil she is trying to escape has become a part of her.
48	Who Killed The Homecoming Queen?	0-671-52964-1
Tania is having the best year of her life. After being voted homecoming queen, someone is jealous, plans to ruin Tania's perfect year, and even to kill Tania as well.
49	Into The Dark	0-671-52966-8
Paulette Fox refuses to let her blindness stop her from living a normal life, especially when it comes to love. Later, her sighted friends witness her new boyfriend commit a heinous crime and fear that Paulette may be next.
50	Best Friend 2	0-671-52965-X
Becka can finally forget how she was blamed for all the horrible things Honey did to her friends, but Honey returns, and this time she won't stop until Becka is dead.
51	Trapped	0-671-01500-1
Some kids in the 1960s used to party in the tunnels under Shadyside High School, until someone (or something) left a bunch of people dead. Elaine Butler and her detention friends are exploring the same tunnels and want to discover the cause of this incident.

== New Fear Street ==
#	Title	ISBN
1	The Stepbrother	0-307-24650-7
Sondra has nightmares of her own death since her stepbrother moved in. A psychic believes that the dreams are memories from a past life and the person who killed her in that life is after her again, and it could be her stepbrother.
2	Camp Out	0-307-24701-5
Maria is hesitant about going camping, but her two best friends convince her to join them. Soon, their camping trip quickly turns dangerous and the girls' lives are at risk.
3	Scream Jennifer, Scream!	0-307-24702-3
Shelli and her friends cheat on their college placement test, but when Jennifer threatens to reveal their secret, they have to do whatever it takes to hide the truth, even murder. Their plan, however, goes wrong, and they are in danger instead.
4	The Bad Girl	0-307-24703-1
Jan creates a formula in the lab to revive dead creatures. When she and her friend Dawn accidentally kill a girl, Dawn revives her with the formula, but the revived girl, Cindy, comes back different and seeks revenge.

== A Fear Street Novel ==
Six new Fear Street books were published from September 2014 to April 2017. Give Me a K-I-L-L was the last contracted novel, but R.L. Stine confirmed via Twitter that more Fear Street books were planned.

Title	Publication date	ISBN
Party Games	September 30, 2014	978-1-250-05161-5
Don't Stay Up Late	April 7, 2015	978-1-250-05162-2
The Lost Girl	September 29, 2015	978-1-250-05163-9
Can You Keep a Secret?	April 12, 2016	978-1-250-05894-2
The Dead Boyfriend	September 27, 2016	978-1-250-05895-9
Give Me a K-I-L-L	April 4, 2017	978-1-250-05896-6

== Return To Fear Street ==
HarperCollins' HarperTEEN picked up the Fear Street series in 2018 with Return to Fear Street. The first novel in this series, You May Now Kill The Bride, was released in July 2018. This new series was released in paperback and also brought a return to the retro "pulp" style book covers.

Title	Publication date	ISBN
You May Now Kill The Bride	July 24, 2018	9780062694256
Two resentful sisters, separated by time, each encounter an ancient curse that haunts their family's weddings. The curse feeds off the family's evil and allows dark history to repeat itself, taking its toll in unexpected ways.
The Wrong Girl	September 25, 2018	9780062694270
Poppy Miller seeks revenge on Jack Saber for his humiliating prank, but when her classmates start dying, suspicion falls on her.
Drop Dead Gorgeous	February 5th, 2019	978-0-062-69429-4
New girl Morgan Marks is popular, smart, and beautiful, but her mysterious past raises questions. As Shadyside Homecoming approaches, Morgan's dark secrets are on the verge of being revealed.

== Fear Street Super Chiller ==
#	Title	ISBN
01	Party Summer	0-671-72920-9
Cari Taylor and her three friends look forward to a "party summer", working at The Howling Wolf Inn. After finding it deserted the mysterious owner allows them to stay, but after a murder is committed, Cari and her friends want to go out but find themselves trapped on the island.
02	Silent Night	0-671-73822-4
Spoiled rich girl Reva is in for a not-so Merry Christmas when someone begins stalking her.
03	Goodnight Kiss	0-671-73823-2
Matt, his girlfriend April, and his friend Todd want a peaceful summer at the beach. This all changes when April and Todd suddenly become weak and pale, have two puncture wounds on their necks, and they might have something to do with the two bats flying over the beach.
04	Broken Hearts	0-671-78609-1
There is someone in Shadyside who kills on Valentine's Day. Josie and Melissa are scared when they each receive threatening valentines.
05	Silent Night 2	0-671-78619-9
One year after the events of "Silent Night", Reva is still in her usual hideous state and ends up being kidnapped.
06	The Dead Lifeguard	0-671-86834-9
The lifeguards at North Beach Country Club want to have fun day and night, but some people say the club is cursed and haunted. The lifeguards soon become aware that something evil is stalking them as they begin to die horrible deaths.
07	Cheerleaders: The New Evil	0-671-86835-7
08	Bad Moonlight	0-671-89424-2
Danielle Verona is chosen to be the lead singer of an up-and-coming band, and discovers that her place in the band (and the therapy sessions she has been in ever since her parents died) are connected to something supernatural.
09	The New Year's Party	0-671-89425-0
P.J. is dead, a practical joke at a Christmas party gone terribly wrong, but now someone is taking revenge for him, killing the kids from the party one by one. If anyone can survive until midnight they will find out who the killer is.
10	Goodnight Kiss 2	0-671-52969-2
Last summer, Billy's girlfriend fell victim to a vampire attack. One year later, Billy wants revenge on her.
11	Silent Night 3	0-671-52970-6
In the final "Silent Night" book, Reva is targeted for murder after her fashion show for her new line of silk scarves (actually belonging to her cousin, Pam, and her friend, Willow) is sabotaged.
12	High Tide	0-671-52971-4
13	Cheerleaders: The Evil Lives!	0-671-52972-2

== Fear Street Cheerleaders ==
#	Title	ISBN
01	The First Evil	0-671-75117-4
02	The Second Evil	0-671-75118-2
03	The Third Evil	0-671-75119-0
04	Cheerleaders: The New Evil	978-0671868352
05	Cheerleaders: The Evil Lives!	978-0671529727

== The Fear Street Saga ==
#	Title	ISBN
01	The Betrayal	0-671-86831-4
02	The Secret	0-671-86832-2
03	The Burning	0-671-86833-0

== 99 Fear Street: The House of Evil ==
#	Title	ISBN
01	The First Horror	0-671-88562-6
02	The Second Horror	0-671-88563-4
03	The Third Horror	0-671-88564-2

== Fear Street: The Cataluna Chronicles ==
#	Title	ISBN
01	The Evil Moon	0-671-89433-1
02	The Dark Secret	0-671-89434-X
03	The Deadly Fire	0-671-89435-8

== Fear Street: Fear Park ==
#	Title	ISBN
01	The First Scream	0-671-52955-2
Back in 1935, a group of teens killed each other due a curse placed on land owned by the Fears to prevent a carnival from being built. Years later, Deirdre Bradley's father owns Fear Park and the horror is going to start all over again.
02	The Loudest Scream	0-671-52956-0
While accidents keep plaguing the park, Deirdre finds herself becoming attracted to Robin Fear, unaware of his true intentions.
03	The Last Scream	0-671-52957-9
Robin Fear's plans for Fear Park may come to fruition, unless the one person he never suspected of turning on him can help Deirdre.

== Ghosts of Fear Street ==
Ghosts of Fear Street is a younger version of the Fear Street series, aimed at children ages 8 to 12. In every book, a 12-year-old child (sometimes with their friends or family) has a terrifying adventure in Fear Street, a small street in the town of Shadyside which is known by the kids in the books to have many ghosts and monsters. Every book has a different monster and child. The series was released by the Simon & Schuster imprint Aladdin Paperbacks, and lasted for thirty-six books, released from 1996 to 1998. In August 2009, Simon & Schuster, under their Children's Publishing imprint, began to reissue the books in special two-in-one editions. Despite being published under Stine's name, the books were in fact ghostwritten.

No.	Title	ISBN
01	Hide and Shriek	0-671-52941-2
Newcomer to Shadyside named Randy hears the stories about a ghost named Pete and is invited to play an unusual game of tag. When Pete tags her, Randy is on the verge of losing the game and could become the newest ghost on Fear Street.
02	Who's Been Sleeping In My Grave?	0-671-52942-0
Shadyside Middle School's newest substitute teacher is a wandering spirit and wants to know who desecrated her gravesite.
03	The Attack of the Aqua Apes	0-671-52943-9
Scott and Glen use water from the Fear Street lake to bring their sea monkeys to life, but this turns them into ravenous monsters.
04	Nightmare in 3-D	0-671-52944-7
Wes Parker buys a 3D magic eye poster from a strange general store, and the more Wes tries to find the hidden picture, the more the hidden picture wants to come into the real world.
05	Stay Away from the Tree House	0-671-52945-5
Two boys find an abandoned tree house in Fear Street woods that is said to be haunted by a boy who died in it while hiding from a lightning storm.
06	Eye of the Fortuneteller	0-671-52946-3
Kelsey Moore has been a Fear Street resident for years and knows the horrors are just urban legends, until she meets a fortuneteller named Madame Valda, who curses Kelsey to face her fears.
07	Fright Knight	0-671-52947-1
Fear Street Museum gets a new delivery: a knight's suit of armor said to be haunted by a knight cursed by a wizard to live and die in his armor. Mike, the son of the Fear Street Museum owner, thinks it is cool, until the armor comes alive and accuses Mike of putting the curse on him.
08	The Ooze	0-671-52948-X
School nerd Al gets a chemistry set for his birthday, but it turns out to be a dud when the stink bomb he makes from it turns to ooze — a strange, bright orange ooze-like substance that saps the intelligence of anyone who touches it.
09	Revenge of the Shadow People	0-671-52949-8
Vinny Salvo wants to hide from own shadow after he discovers that his shadow has a life of its own.
10	The Bugman Lives!	0-671-52950-1
After accidentally mowing down the tombstone of an insect-obsessed scientist known as the Bugman, Janet is haunted by bugs of all shapes and sizes.
11	The Boy Who Ate Fear Street	0-671-00183-3
A picky eater named Sam suddenly starts to devour everything in sight that is not considered food when his friend's weird aunt laces his rice pudding (Note: Referred to as macaroni and cheese in the description.) with a weird spice said to send people into feeding frenzies.
12	Night of the Werecat	0-671-00184-1
Wendy is a girl obsessed with cats, but her parents won't let her have one. While at a craft's fair, Wendy steals a charm necklace from an old woman who claims that it mutates people into werecats.
13	How to Be a Vampire	0-671-00185-X
One morning, Andrew finds a guide book on how to be a vampire, along with some bite marks on his neck. While Andrew thinks being a child of the night is all fun and games, his teacher has other plans.
14	Body Switchers from Outer Space	0-671-00186-8
A clumsy boy named Will would do anything to be like Chad, the coolest kid in school. When Chad tells Will he has his own invention (a body-swapping machine) in his house, he jumps at the chance to make the switch, only to regret it when he discovers that Chad is an extraterrestrial.
15	Fright Christmas	0-671-00187-6
Charles Dickens' holiday classic A Christmas Carol gets a modern-day horror twist in this tale of a bully named Kenny Frobisher who gets locked in Darby's Department Store (the same one owned by rich girl Reva in the Fear Street Super Chiller books) on Christmas Eve and encounters three ghosts who show him why he is mean during the holidays and what will happen if he does not change his ways.
16	Don't Ever Get Sick at Granny's	0-671-00188-4
Corey is spending the weekend with his Granny Marsha, but before his parents leave, they warn Corey not to get sick at her place and Corey finds out that Granny Marsha's home remedies escalate to torture, bizarre science experiments, and reality warping.
17	House of a Thousand Screams	0-671-00190-6
Jill and Freddie inherit their dead Uncle Solly's house, which would not be a problem, except that Solly was a magician who left behind some magic creatures that won't stay dead.
18	Camp Fear Ghouls	0-671-00191-4
Lizzy joins a girls' nature club called the Fear Girls, who turn out to have strong connections with the undead.
19	Three Evil Wishes	0-671-00189-2
Hannah finds a bottle at Fear Lake that reads, "Danger: Do Not Open". Hannah's brother, Jesse, ignores this warning, and the siblings find themselves doing battle with a bitter genie who has been stuffed in the bottle for 100 years.
20	Spell of the Screaming Jokers	0-671-00192-2
Brittany finds herself playing for her life when the jokers in her new deck of cards come after her.
21	The Creature from Club Lagoona	0-671-00850-1
Tad and his family are on vacation at Club Lagoona, which, for Tad, is not good, as he is afraid of swimming in the deep end, and also fearing that a scaly monster may be waiting for him there.
22	Field of Screams	0-671-00851-X
During a Little League game, Buddy gets hit in the head with a baseball and finds himself back in the late 1940s as Shadyside's greatest baseball player, one that was a member of a baseball team who died in a bus crash after the championship game. Buddy tries to find a way to change the course of history before his fate is sealed.
23	Why I'm Not Afraid of Ghosts	0-671-00852-8
Robbie and Dora are ghost kids living in a haunted house that now has a new resident, a human boy named Oliver Brown, who does not believe in ghosts and has a logical explanation behind all the paranormal activity. Robbie and Dora try to scare Oliver into believing that the ghosts are real.
24	Monster Dog	0-671-00853-6
Maggie gets a new puppy named Poocher, but one visit to Fear Street's most gruesome veterinarian turns the cute little pooch into a monster.
25	Halloween Bugs Me!	0-671-00854-4
Greg Romer always loses to Paul Boyd, but not this time. Even though Paul says he will get more Halloween candy than Greg, Greg is going to beat him with his secret weapon, which is a bag that produces more of whatever is put in it, like candy, money and bugs.
26	Go to Your Tomb—Right Now!	0-671-00855-2
While taking a shortcut through the Fear Street Cemetery, Jack meets a strange girl who offers him a chance to become invisible, but Jack soon learns that nothing good can come from it, especially if the girl in question has an ulterior motive.
27	Parents from the 13th Dimension	0-671-00857-9
Sarah would like nothing more than to trade her bizarre family for one that is more well-behaved, which she does by flipping a coin that lets her go into an alternate dimension where she has a perfect family. Sarah, however, is unaware that this perfect family wants to eat her for lunch.
28	Hide and Shriek II	0-307-24900-X
In the sequel to the first book, the ghost children of Shadyside's graveyard are back and ready to lure human kids into playing hide and seek with them for their lives.
29	The Tale of the Blue Monkey	0-307-24902-6
Amanda and Danny find a blue monkey doll in the backyard, the same one their babysitter described in a story that can curse a family with bad luck.
30	I Was a Sixth-Grade Zombie	0-307-24901-8
Valerie and Mark know that there is something weird about the new after-school club building on Oak Street, especially when the students of Shadyside Middle School start joining and come out acting polite and robotic and Valerie finds herself mindlessly obeying commands and unable to tell her parents about the after-school club's ulterior motives.
31	Escape of the He-Beast	0-307-24904-2
Jamie Kolker is a fan of comic book villain, Hecula the He-Beast, and gets a computer CD featuring Hecula's sketches and drawings, which come to life when he uploads them to the computer.
32	Caution: Aliens At Work	0-307-24903-4
Matt finds a toolbox in Fear Street Woods, but the tools inside are more than just screwdrivers, hammers, and wrenches. This toolbox is literally out of this world, and the alien who lost it is coming to Earth to get it back.
33	Attack of the Vampire Worms	0-307-24905-0
Jane and Lewis find themselves trapped underground, along with a species of bloodsucking worms and two pale strangers who cannot tolerate the sunlight.
34	Horror Hotel – Part I: The Vampire Checks in	0-307-24906-9
When Joe and his family move to Fear Street to help run Grandpa Howie's hotel, Joe discovers that the hotel is home to some vampires, and a ghost boy with a magic key that curses Joe and Grandpa Howie to switch bodies.
35	Horror Hotel – Part II: Ghost in the Guest Room	0-307-24907-7
With Grandpa Howie and Joe in each other's bodies, the two must work together to break the spell and banish the ghost who cursed them.
36	The Funhouse of Dr. Freek	0-307-24909-3
Joe (not the same one from the "Horror Hotel" two-parter) smashes a funhouse mirror at a carnival, but instead of seven years' bad luck, Joe gets an evil twin. NOTE: It is currently unknown if this book exists and was scrapped (similar to how Goosebumps 2000 was originally supposed to end with "The Incredible Shrinking Fifth Grader") or if it never existed in the first place.

== Fear Street Sagas ==
The 16 books in this series were published by Simon Pulse and Golden Books from March 1996 to January 1999. Two other books, The Raven Woman and Carousel of Fear appeared on advertisements, but were never released. R. L. Stine confirmed via his official Twitter account that neither of these unpublished books were ever written.

#	Title	Publisher	Publication date	ISBN
01	A New Fear	Simon Pulse	March 1996	0-671-52952-8
The dark power of the Fear family consumes all those connected with it, which includes the entire town of Shadyside. All are tainted forever by the evil of the family's curse and no one can escape. Nora Goode and Daniel Fear hoped to end the curse of the Fear family, but on their wedding day, a horrible fire swept through the Fear mansion, taking the life of every member of the doomed family, except for Nora and Nicholas, Nora and Daniel's children, and the dark forces try to claim another life from Fear family.
02	House of Whispers	Simon Pulse	June 1996	0-671-52953-6
Visiting her cousins Simon and Angelica Fear, unaware of the terrible legacy that haunts everyone associated with the Fear family, Amy Pierce senses an evil presence in their New Orleans mansion and fears she will never escape.
03	Forbidden Secrets	Simon Pulse	September 1996	0-671-52954-4
Refusing to believe in the superstitions surrounding the Fear family, Savannah Madison proceeds with her wedding to handsome Tyler Fear and moves to Blackrose Manor, where she is terrified by a series of bizarre deaths.
04	The Sign of Fear	Simon Pulse	December 1996	0-671-00291-0
Discovering the ancient Fear amulet, Christina, a young servant girl, finds her fate linked to the revenge-driven warrior Fieran, the amulet's creator, who cursed the Fear family centuries earlier.
05	The Hidden Evil	Simon Pulse	February 1997	0-671-00292-9
Timothy tells his friends a story that gives him the power to control other people and summon the dead. The story is about Maggie, who escapes prison to work as a governess of two children.
06	Daughters of Silence	Simon Pulse	April 1997	0-671-00293-7
Angelica and Simon Fear attempt to bring their two daughters back from the grave, even if it means killing two innocent girls.
07	Children of Fear	Simon Pulse	June 1997	0-671-00294-5
After their parents' death, Luke, Leah, and Corey Fier must find themselves a brand-new place to live. There are some people who happen to get on their way, but not if the animals have the job to get rid of them. Luke blames his siblings for their power to control animals, but it is possible that they are just an accidents.
08	Dance of Death	Simon Pulse	August 1997	0-671-00295-3
Having fallen in love with Justin Fier, Madeline is warned by two unusual sources that Justin is driven by an evil quest that destroys any woman who would get close to him.
09	Heart of the Hunter	Simon Pulse	October 1997	0-671-00296-1
A medicine woman tells Jamie Fier that she knows how he can win the heart of the girl he loves, but it will cost him. She gives him a potion to drink, and that night, when the moon is full, Jamie is mutated into a wolf. With each full moon, he metamorphoses again, but if his true love sees him while he is in the form of a wolf, he will remain a wolf forever.
10	The Awakening Evil	Simon Pulse	December 1997	0-671-00297-X
After seeing her husband Thomas getting pushed into a pool of boiling water and die soon afterwards, Jane turns ill. She gets well in a month's time, during which time the spirit of Sarah Burns, her best friend, goes inside her. She causes Jane to murder her friend Liza Teasedale, the foreman of the mill and Clara, Jane's maid, by controlling her body. Jane commits suicide soon afterwards in order to stop Sarah from leaving her body and committing any more murders.
11	Circle of Fire	Golden Books	February 1998	0-307-24800-3
Mia Saxton is invited by a group of girls to perform magic from Emma Reade's spellbook, but the spells are dangerous. Mia must figure a way to stop the girls' spells before they stop her.
12	Chamber of Fear	Golden Books	April 1998	0-307-24801-1
Carolyn is hired as a magician's assistant to the Fier family. She discovers they hold the Chamber of Fear and is ready to free her mother's spirit.
13	Faces of Terror	Golden Books	July 1998	0-307-24802-X
One day, a nightmare convinces Elizabeth Nelson that something horrible has happened to her twin brother Thomas, who works as a sculptor for Peter Gustavson. She travels to his home, where she discovers that Thomas was murdered and all of Gustavson's wax figures have spirits trapped inside of them. Out of rage, she burns all the wax figures in his workshop, taking Gustavson's and Virginia's life with them.
14	One Last Kiss	Golden Books	September 1998	0-307-24803-8
Eleanor Rawlings is determined to kill the vampire that killed her father. She goes to Trevor Fier, one of her father's friends, for help. She falls in love with him, until she realizes Trevor might be the vampire she is looking for.
15	Door of Death	Golden Books	November 1998	0-307-24804-6
16	The Hand of Power	Golden Books	January 1999	0-307-24805-4
Margarete Fier feels very fortunate when Peter Sturdevant rescues her from a mob, but more danger awaits when she finds a secret source of power hidden in his haunted mansion.
17	The Raven Woman	Golden Books	Cancelled	0-307-24806-2
The American Revolution approaches and Meg Fier finds shelter with Dr. Malcolm Howell, a renowned physician. She falls in love with him, until she discovers his dangerous mind control experiments and turns to the mysterious Raven Woman for help.
18	Carousel of Doom	N/A	N/A	Cancelled

== Fear Street Seniors ==
#	Title	ISBN
01	Let's Party!	0-307-24705-8
02	In Too Deep	0-307-24706-6
03	The Thirst	0-307-24707-4
04	No Answer	0-307-24708-2
05	Last Chance	0-307-24709-0
06	The Gift	0-307-24710-4
07	Fight, Team, Fight!	0-307-24711-2
08	Sweetheart, Evil Heart	0-307-24712-0
09	Spring Break	0-307-24713-9
10	Wicked	0-307-24714-7
11	The Prom Date	0-307-24715-5
12	Graduation Day	0-307-24716-3

== Fear Street Nights ==
#	Title	ISBN
01	Moonlight Secrets	0-689-87864-8
Lewis and Jamie start hanging out after midnight with their friends "The Night People", but soon they become the targets of someone who wants them dead.
02	Midnight Games	0-689-87865-6
Dana Fear comes to Shadyside, and joins "The Night People", but the killings start again and all fingers point to her.
03	Darkest Dawn	0-689-87866-4
Things are finally starting to look better for "The Night People", until the murders start again.

== Bibliography ==
- Collins, Robert A.; Latham, Robert. Science Fiction & Fantasy Book Review Annual 1991. Greenwood Publishing Group: 1993. ISBN 0-313-28326-5
- Gerasimo, Luisa; Whiteley, Sandra. The Teacher's Calendar of Famous Birthdays. McGraw-Hill: 2003. ISBN 0-07-141230-1
