= Sentinels novels =

Series of novels by Van Allen Plexico

Sentinels series
- Author: Van Allen Plexico
- Illustrator: Chris Kohler
- Cover artist: Jim Jiminez, Rowell Roque, Danny Wall, Mitch Foust, Chris Kohler
- Country: United States
- Language: English
- Genre: Superhero fiction, space opera
- Published: 2006-2017

The Sentinels novels by Van Allen Plexico comprise a sequence of superhero fiction works in prose format with occasional interior illustrations. They are set primarily in the present-day United States. The first novel was published in 2006.

The novels follow the adventures of a group of paranormal agents loosely affiliated with the United States government and the US Defense Department. The central character, Lyn Li (codenamed "Pulsar"), is a Chinese-American college student and self-proclaimed "nerd" who discovers she possesses electromagnetic-based super powers. She is pursued by both good and villainous agents wishing to recruit her onto their teams. Thus far the series includes nine novels and one anthology, plus a large-format book collecting the interior and cover artwork done for the series by Chris Kohler.

The first trilogy of novels, The Grand Design, centers around the schemes of an over-the-top villain called the Warlord and his assistant, Francisco, to unify the Multiverse into a single realm that the Warlord can rule. The second trilogy, The Rivals, takes on a more "cosmic" aspect, with vastly powerful entities from space coming to Earth and possibly destroying it as a consequence of their ancient conflicts. The third trilogy, originally called Order Above All but then revised to The Earth - Kur-Bai War, began in December 2012 with publication of Metalgod and concluded in 2017 with Vendetta.

Plexico has spoken in interviews and in panel discussions at conventions about the origins of the characters and the series, and of planning a total of twenty or twenty-one novels in the series. He has described them as "action/adventure novels with a heavy “cosmic” SF theme, but with the flavor of 1970s-80s Marvel comics such as the AVENGERS." He has said that the main themes he seeks to address in the series are the concepts of identity, memory and loyalty.

Plexico has said his reason for writing superhero stories as novels rather than in the more traditional comic book format is, "I'm able to both cover a LOT of ground, time-wise-- more than a year's worth of story in just one book--and go more in-depth with the characters, the way a novel allows you to do."

The first three novels in the series were published in 2006 and 2007 by WhiteRocketBooks and then, beginning in 2008, were reprinted by Swarm Press, an imprint of horror/apocalyptic fiction publishers Permuted Press. Subsequent volumes have been published by White Rocket Books. A paperback omnibus of the first three volumes, as well as a limited edition hardcover containing the first three books plus additional art and features, were published in 2007 but are now both out of print. New omnibus paperbacks of the first and second trilogy were published by White Rocket Books in 2012. Sentinels short stories have been published by A Thousand Faces magazine.

The seventh volume overall and sixth novel, Stellarax, completing the "Rivals" trilogy, was published by White Rocket Books in June 2011. The eighth volume overall and seventh novel, Metalgod, beginning The Earth - Kur-Bai War trilogy, was published by White Rocket Books in December 2012. The ninth volume overall and eighth novel, The Dark Crusade, was published by White Rocket Books in September 2016. The final novel in the third trilogy, Vendetta, was published in May 2017.

== The Sentinels series ==
Cover of the fifth novel in the Sentinels series of Superhero fiction novels, Worldmind (White Rocket Books, 2010)

1. When Strikes the Warlord (White Rocket Books edition, 2006; Swarm Press edition, 2008) ISBN 1-934861-06-5
2. A Distant Star (White Rocket Books edition, 2007; Swarm Press edition, 2008) ISBN 1-934861-07-3
3. Apocalypse Rising (White Rocket Books edition, 2007; Swarm Press edition, 2008) ISBN 1-934861-08-1
4. The Shiva Advent (2009) ISBN 978-0-9841392-1-7
5. Worldmind (2010) ISBN 978-0-9841392-2-4
6. Stellarax (2011) ISBN 978-0-9841392-4-8
7. Metalgod (2012) ISBN 978-0-6157339-0-6
8. The Dark Crusade (2016) ISBN 978-0984139293
9. Vendetta (2017) ISBN 978-1546517832

The nine novels have been collected in three paperback omnibus editions:

1. The Grand Design (omnibus paperback collection of first three novels; 2008; reissued 2012) ISBN 978-0-984-13925-5
2. The Rivals (omnibus paperback collection of second trilogy of novels; 2012) ISBN 978-0-984-13927-9
3. The Earth - Kur-Bai War (omnibus paperback collection of third trilogy of novels; 2018) ISBN 978-1721688487

Following publication of the ninth novel, an over-sized art book was published containing all the black-and-white interior illustrations from all nine books plus cover artwork and commentary by artist Chris Kohler and author Van Allen Plexico: Sentinels: The Art of Chris Kohler (2017) ISBN 978-1548867454

There is also an anthology with stories by Plexico and several guest writers: Alternate Visions (anthology; 2009) ISBN 978-0-578-01120-2

In 2007 White Rocket issued a special limited edition hardcover Widescreen Special Edition volume that included the first three novels plus the short stories from Alternate Visions and additional sketch art and other material.
