= Okal Rel Universe =

Setting for a 10-novel series written by Lynda Williams

The Okal Rel Universe (also referred to as the ORU) is the setting for a 10-novel series written by Lynda Williams.

== Description ==
The universe is a future where the cultural and biological evolution of the human race has divided it into two societies: "Gelacks" and "Reetions". Gelacks are dominated by the neo-feudal descendants of an ancient bioengineering project that modified humans to tolerate reality skimming. "Reality skimming" (also known as rel-skimming) is a physically and mentally strenuous method of faster than light space travel which underpins the economy and culture of the Okal Rel Universe. The Reetions are the descendants of unmodified humans whose social system depends upon transparency moderated by a form of artificial intelligence known as arbiters. Each race has advantages and handicaps, physical or cultural.

One of the dominant themes of the ORU is an exploration of how those two societies settle conflicts. In the first novel in the series The Courtesan Prince, Gelacks and Reetions are obliged to take official notice of each other for the first time in 200 years.

Okal Rel is the belief system of the bio-engineered sub-species of humans called Sevolites, comes in a variety of sects, and is based on the sacredness of habitat as the stage on which souls are reborn. Most varieties link the prospects of rebirth to honorable behavior in life, as judged by other souls awaiting rebirth, and the availability of descendants.

== Published works ==
=== The Saga ===
- The Courtesan Prince (2005) ISBN 1-894063-28-7
- Righteous Anger (2006) ISBN 978-1-894063-38-8
- Pretenders (2006) ISBN 978-1-894063-13-5
- Throne Price (2003) ISBN 1-894063-06-6
- Far Arena (2009) ISBN 978-1-894063-45-6
- Avim's Oath (2010) ISBN 978-1-894063-35-7
- Healer's Sword (2012) ISBN 978-1-894063-51-7
- Gathering Storm (2013) ISBN 978-1-77053-020-1
- Holy War (2013) ISBN 978-1-77053-032-4

=== Okal Rel Legacy Series ===
- Encyclopedic Guide to the ORU (2009) ISBN 978-1-894817-43-1
- Horth in Killing Reach (2008) ISBN 978-1-894063-37-1
- Kath: An Okal Rel Universe Legacy Novella (2009) ISBN 978-1-894817-41-7
- The Lorel Experiment: The story of Sevolite Origins (2009) ISBN 978-1-894817-39-4
- Mekan'stan: An Okal Rel Universe Legacy Novella (2009) ISBN 978-1-894817-37-0
- Opus 1: An Okal Rel Universe Legacy Anthology (2009) ISBN 978-1-894817-31-8
- Opus 2: An Okal Rel Universe Legacy Anthology (2009) ISBN 978-1-894817-33-2
- Opus 3: An Okal Rel Universe Legacy Anthology (2009) ISBN 978-1-894817-35-6
