= Bernhard Hennen =

German writer of fantasy literature (born 1966)

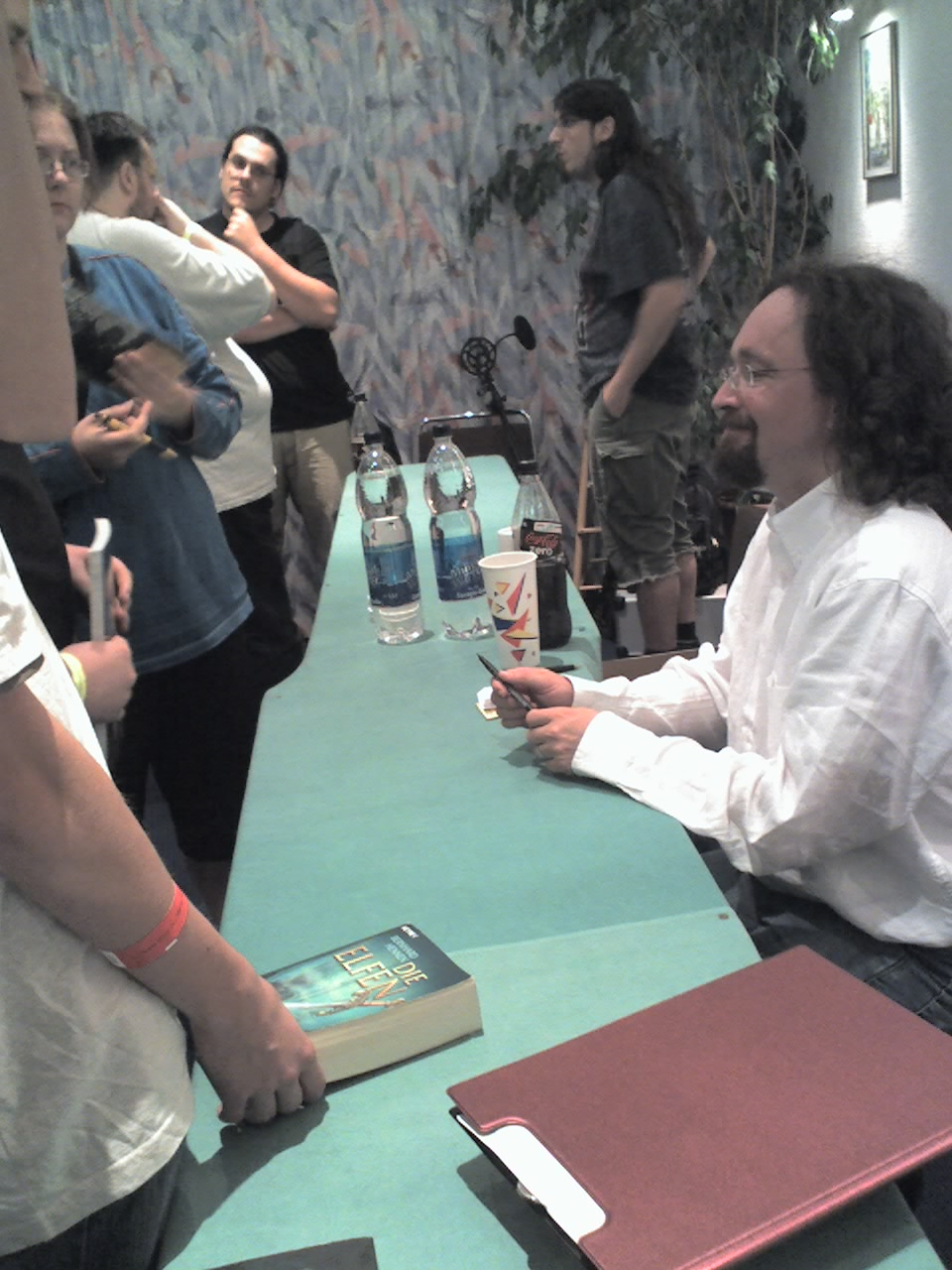
- Born: 1966 (age 59–60); Krefeld, Germany
- Occupation: Novelist
- Writing career
- Genre: Fantasy
- Website: www.bernhard-hennen.de

Bernhard Hennen (born 1966 in Krefeld) is a German writer of fantasy literature.

He is best known internationally for his series Die Elfen ("The Elves", since 2004), which has been translated into a number of European languages.

== Career ==
He graduated from the University of Cologne. He worked as a journalist for various newspapers and radio stations.

He began his writing career with Das Jahr des Greifen which he co-authored with Wolfgang Hohlbein in 1994. He followed up with four historical novels published 1996–1999 before returning to the fantasy genre in the 2000s.

He also wrote for the role-playing game The Dark Eye.

== Personal life ==
He is married, has two children, and has been living once again in Krefeld since 2000.

== Bibliography ==
- 1996 - Der Tempelmord
- 1996 - Der Flötenspieler
- 1998 - Die Husarin
- 1999 - Die Könige der ersten Nacht
- 2001 - Nebenan
- 2001 - Das Jahr des Greifen, together with Wolfgang Hohlbein (a The Dark Eye-novel)
- 2002 - Der Wahrträumer. Gezeitenwelt 1
- 2003 - Im Schatten des Raben (a The Dark Eye-novel)
- 2004 - Das Geheimnis der Gezeitenwelt - Die Saga von der Wiedergeburt der Magie
- 2005 - Alica und die Dunkle Königin
- 2007 - Rabensturm (a The Dark Eye-novel)

Die Elfen

Bernhard Hennens Die Elfen series was translated into Dutch (De Elfen), Italian (Gli Elfi), French (Les Elfes), Czech (Elfové), Spanish (Los Elfos), Portuguese (Os Elfos), Russian (Эльфы), Ukrainian (Ельфи) and English (The Elven).

- 2004 - Die Elfen, together with James A. Sullivan
  - Translated into English as The Elven
- 2005 - Elfenwinter
  - Translated into English in two parts: Elven Winter and Elven Queen
- 2006 - Elfenlicht
- 2009 - Elfenlied
- 2009 - Elfenkönigin
- 2010 - Elfenwelten
- 2017 - Elfenmacht
- 2024 - Elfenmond

Drachenelfen

- 2011 - Drachenelfen
- 2012 - Drachenelfen - Die Windgängerin
- 2013 - Drachenelfen - Die gefesselte Göttin
- 2015 - Drachenelfen - Die letzten Eiskrieger
- 2016 - Drachenelfen - Himmel in Flammen

Elfenritter

- 2007 - Elfenritter - Die Ordensburg
- 2008 - Elfenritter - Die Albenmark
- 2008 - Elfenritter - Das Fjordland

Die Phileasson-Saga (together with Robert Corvus)

- 2016 – Die Phileasson-Saga – Nordwärts
- 2016 – Die Phileasson-Saga – Himmelsturm
- 2016 – Die Phileasson-Saga – Die Wölfin
- 2017 – Die Phileasson-Saga – Silberflamme
- 2018 – Die Phileasson-Saga – Schlangengrab
- 2018 – Die Phileasson-Saga – Totenmeer
- 2019 – Die Phileasson-Saga – Rosentempel
- 2020 – Die Phileasson-Saga – Elfenkrieg
- 2020 – Die Phileasson-Saga – Echsengötter
- 2022 – Die Phileasson-Saga – Nebelinseln
- 2022 – Die Phileasson-Saga – Elfenkönig
- 2023 – Die Phileasson-Saga – König der Meere
