= Lynda Williams =

Canadian science fiction author and blogger (born 1958)

- Born: February 17, 1958 (age 68)
- Education: McMaster University, University of Toronto, University of Victoria
- Occupations: Author, blogger, analyst
- Writing career
- Genre: Science fiction
- Notable work: Okal Rel Universe

Lynda Williams (born February 17, 1958) is a Canadian science fiction author and blogger.

Williams' fiction is centered on a series of ten novels set in the fictional Okal Rel Universe and published by Edge Science Fiction and Fantasy Publishing. Additional works by Williams and votary authors writing in her universe are published by the Absolute XPress imprint of Hades Publications, Inc.

She is the founder of the online journal Reflections on Water.

Williams lives in Burnaby, British Columbia where she is a Learning Technology Analyst and Manager for Teaching and Learning Centre at Simon Fraser University.

Lynda has extensive experience in learning technologies and instructional design.

== Bibliography ==
=== Complete list of works in the Okal Rel series ===
==== Novels ====
1. The Courtesan Prince (2005)
2. Righteous Anger (2006)
3. Pretenders (2008)
4. Throne Price (2003) with Alison Sinclair
5. Far Arena (2009)
6. Avim's Oath (2010)
7. Healer's Sword (2012)
8. Gathering Storm (2012)
9. Holy War (2013)
10. Unholy Science (2014)

==== Anthologies ====
1. The Okal Rel Universe Anthology I (2005) with Virginia O'Dine
2. The Okal Rel Universe Anthology 2 (2007) with John Preet
3. Opus 3: An Okal Rel Universe Legacy Anthology (2009) with Jennifer Sparling
4. Opus 4 (2010) with Shelia Flesher
5. Opus 5 (2011) with Sandra Fitzpatrick
6. Opus 6 (2013) with Paula Johanson

==== Nonfiction ====
1. Guide to the Okal-Rel Universe (2006)

== See also ==
- List of science-fiction authors
