= Gezeitenwelt =

Die Gezeitenwelt (World of Tides) is the name of a series of German fantasy novels. They are set on a planet named World of Tides that is hit by large fragments of a comet with dramatic consequences: The coasts are hit by gigantic tsunamis, earthquakes alter the landscape, a global climate change ensues - and mysterious magic awakes, that lets monsters appear and dreams become reality.

A distinct feature of the Gezeitenwelt is its attempted realism in a fantastic context, which is based on research by the authors with the help of geophysicists, archaeologists, anthropologists and biologists.

The series was planned in three groups of four books. After the release of the introductory group, the publisher Piper Verlag offered only to finish the series with one instead of eight more books, which the authors refused. The series rests at the moment (2007).

== Authors ==
The novels are written by four authors sharing the pseudonym Magus Magellan. Magus stands for the magic in the World of Tides, while Magellan represents the element of discovery.

The authors are:

- Bernhard Hennen
- Hadmar von Wieser
- Thomas Finn
- Karl-Heinz Witzko

These authors have among other works contributed intensively to the role-playing game The Dark Eye.

== Books ==
The Gezeitenwelt series was planned to cover a fictitious period of about 50 years divided into three groups. Only the first group has been realized (2007).

- Prelude
  - Das Geheimnis der Gezeitenwelt (The Secret of the World of Tides)(10/2004) ISBN 3-492-26566-9 (SC)
- 1st group
  - Der Wahrträumer (The True-Dreamer) by Bernhard Hennen (10/2002) ISBN 3-492-70051-9 (HC) / ISBN 3-492-26541-3 (SC)
  - Himmlisches Feuer (Heavenly Fire) by Hadmar von Wieser (03/2003) ISBN 3-492-70052-7 (HC) / ISBN 3-492-26542-1 (SC)
  - Das Weltennetz (The Worlds' Net) by Thomas Finn (09/2003) ISBN 3-492-70054-3 (HC) / ISBN 3-492-26543-X (SC)
  - Die Purpurinseln (The Crimson Islands) by Thomas Finn (04/2004) ISBN 3-492-70055-1 (HC) / ISBN 3-492-26544-8 (SC)
  - Das Traumbeben (The Dreamquake) by Karl-Heinz Witzko (10/2004) ISBN 3-492-70053-5 (HC) / ISBN 3-492-26545-6 (SC)

Each book of the 1st group is a self-contained description about the events directly before to some years after the cosmic hit in different parts of the world (only book three and four by Thomas Finn belong together), with some reappearing events and minor characters. The novels won the Deutscher Rollenspiele Preis (German role-playing prize) for best novel in 2003 and 2004.

== Illustrations ==
The maps of the world were designed by Franz Vohwinkel, who became known for his illustrations of games like Settlers of Catan and Magic: The Gathering. The interior illustrations were done by German drawer Caryad, known mainly for her work in The Dark Eye.
