= Van Allen Plexico =

American novelist

- Plexico at Dragon Con in 2026
- Born: January 12, 1968 (age 58); Sylacauga, Alabama, U.S.
- Education: Auburn University
- Occupations: Writer/Editor, Podcaster and Educator
- Writing career
- Genres: Science fiction, Superhero fiction, Pulp Adventure, Caper story, Sports Commentary, Comics Commentary
- Subjects: History, Political Science
- Website: plexico.net

Van Allen Plexico (born January 12, 1968) is an American professor of Political Science and History, a Pulp Grand Master, a Sports and Pop Culture podcast host and producer, and a science fiction and fantasy author. He is generally considered one of the leading figures in the New Pulp movement.

== Biography ==
Born in Sylacauga, Alabama, United States, Van Allen Plexico graduated from Auburn University with bachelor's and master's degrees in 1990 and 1994, doing additional graduate work at Georgetown University and at Emory University. From 1995 through 2006, he lived and worked in the Atlanta, Georgia metro area, teaching at Georgia Perimeter College and at Shorter University. In 2006 he was named Assistant Professor of Political Science and History at Southwestern Illinois College, near St. Louis, Missouri. In 2018 he was promoted to full Professor. In 2025, at the Pulp Factory Awards, held at the Windy City Pulp and Paperback Convention in Chicago, he was named the third-ever Pulp Grand Master by the Pulp Factory, an association of New Pulp writers, artists, editors and publishers, for his lifetime contributions to New Pulp literature. He has won the Pulp Factory Award for Best Novel of the Year four times (out of seven shortlisted finalist nominations), most recently in 2023 for his novel Validus-V. He has appeared as a featured speaker before regional literary guilds, book festivals and international organizations of English and Writing instructors, and he has appeared on numerous radio and television programs to discuss his sports writing and commentary. He has worked as a professional sports podcaster and sports author since 2012, covering Auburn University athletics (specifically football and basketball) for the AU Wishbone Podcast, the War Eagle Reader, and as author and editor of numerous books about Auburn football. In 2021, Nissan Motor Company produced a television commercial based on an idea he suggested, as part of their Heisman House campaign, and featuring former Auburn and NFL star, Bo Jackson.

== Career ==
Plexico has lectured, written, and spoken professionally on the craft of fiction writing and the historical roots of contemporary comic books and science fiction and fantasy literature. He has been published in print and online in the areas of sports, book, television, film, and comics criticism and commentary (often by RevolutionSF.com and The War Eagle Reader]), and has moderated discussion panels and emceed trivia tournaments at science fiction conventions around the US, beginning in 1998. He has appeared as a featured speaker before regional literary guilds and international organizations of English and Writing instructors. He has been an occasional featured speaker at the St Louis Science Center's monthly First Friday pop culture events.

He is the host of multiple weekly or semi-weekly podcast programs, including: The AU Wishbone Podcast, in which he and co-host John Ringer discuss Auburn University College football; The White Rocket Podcast, in which he interviews a different guest each week about a specific pop culture topic; On Her Majesty's Secret Podcast, discussing the James Bond spy films, and The White Rocket Babylon 5 Review Podcast. All shows are part of the White Rocket Entertainment Network.

He is the author of twenty-two novels and numerous novellas and short stories. He has also co-written and/or edited five non-fiction books on Auburn sports, three non-fiction books on comics history, and numerous adventure fiction anthologies from a variety of publishers.

He has written nine volumes and edited one anthology in the Sentinels series of Superhero fiction / pulp adventure novels and stories, which he co-created with Bobby Politte in 1996. These books have been published (volumes one-three) by Swarm Press and (beginning with volume four) by White Rocket Books. Artist Chris Kohler has provided five full-page interior illustrations for each volume. Sentinels short stories also have been published in A Thousand Faces magazine.

He has written seven novels and one novella in the Shattering space opera series, beginning with Lucian: Dark God's Homecoming in 2009. These books have been published by Airship 27 Productions and by White Rocket Books.

A member of the Pulp Factory writers' and artists' group, Plexico's classic pulp revival novels and novellas have been published by Airship 27 Productions and Pro Se Press, among others. His Kerry Keen/The Griffon novella, "Conspiracy of Terror," was published by Adamant Entertainment in Thrilling Tales #1 and reprinted in Airship 27's Lance Star - Sky Ranger, Vol. 2. His science fiction novel, Lucian: Dark God's Homecoming, was published by Airship 27 in summer 2009. Additionally, two of his short stories were featured in Airship 27's bestselling and multiple award-winning anthology, Sherlock Holmes: Consulting Detective, Vol. 1, also in 2009. Plexico also serves as an editor for White Rocket Books, editing and helping to publish novels and anthologies by writers such as Mark Bousquet, Jeff Deischer, James Palmer, and I. A. Watson. He has served as assistant editor on multiple projects for Airship 27.

An inductee of the Heroes Magazine Hall of Fame for his early work in the comics fandom community, he was founder (in 1995) and is executive editor of the Avengers-related comic book archives and reference site, AvengersAssemble. He has also contributed to the Wizard Magazine archives and was chosen by the Rittenhouse Archives to write the text for the backs of Upper Deck's commemorative The Complete Avengers, 1963-Present trading card set, chronicling the year-by-year history of the team. In 2007 he edited ASSEMBLED!, a critically acclaimed collection of essays analyzing and commenting upon Marvel's Avengers comics, with profits going to the HERO Initiative. A sequel, ASSEMBLED! 2, was published in July 2009.

In September 2010 Plexico became a contributing columnist for the Auburn University sports and popular culture commentary site, The War Eagle Reader. His columns, written with John Ringer, were collected in a single volume, Season of Our Dreams, published in January 2011. In July 2011, that book made Amazon.com's Top 20 Best Sellers List for books about American football.

In May 2013, Plexico's second nonfiction book about Auburn University football (again with co-author John Ringer), Decades of Dominance: Auburn Football in the Modern Era, was published as a trade paperback and in June 2013 it climbed to third on Amazon.com's Sports Best Sellers List. Plexico was interviewed about the book on the Alabama Tonight program on Birmingham, Alabama's NBC TV station and on other radio and TV programs.

Writer Kurt Busiek introduced the character of Detective Plexico to the pages of Marvel's Iron Man comic book series in 1999 as a reference to Van Plexico and the Avengers Assemble! Web site. In 2001, writer Keith R. A. DeCandido included a reference to the name Plexico in his Farscape novel, House of Cards, as a nod to Plexico.

== Awards ==
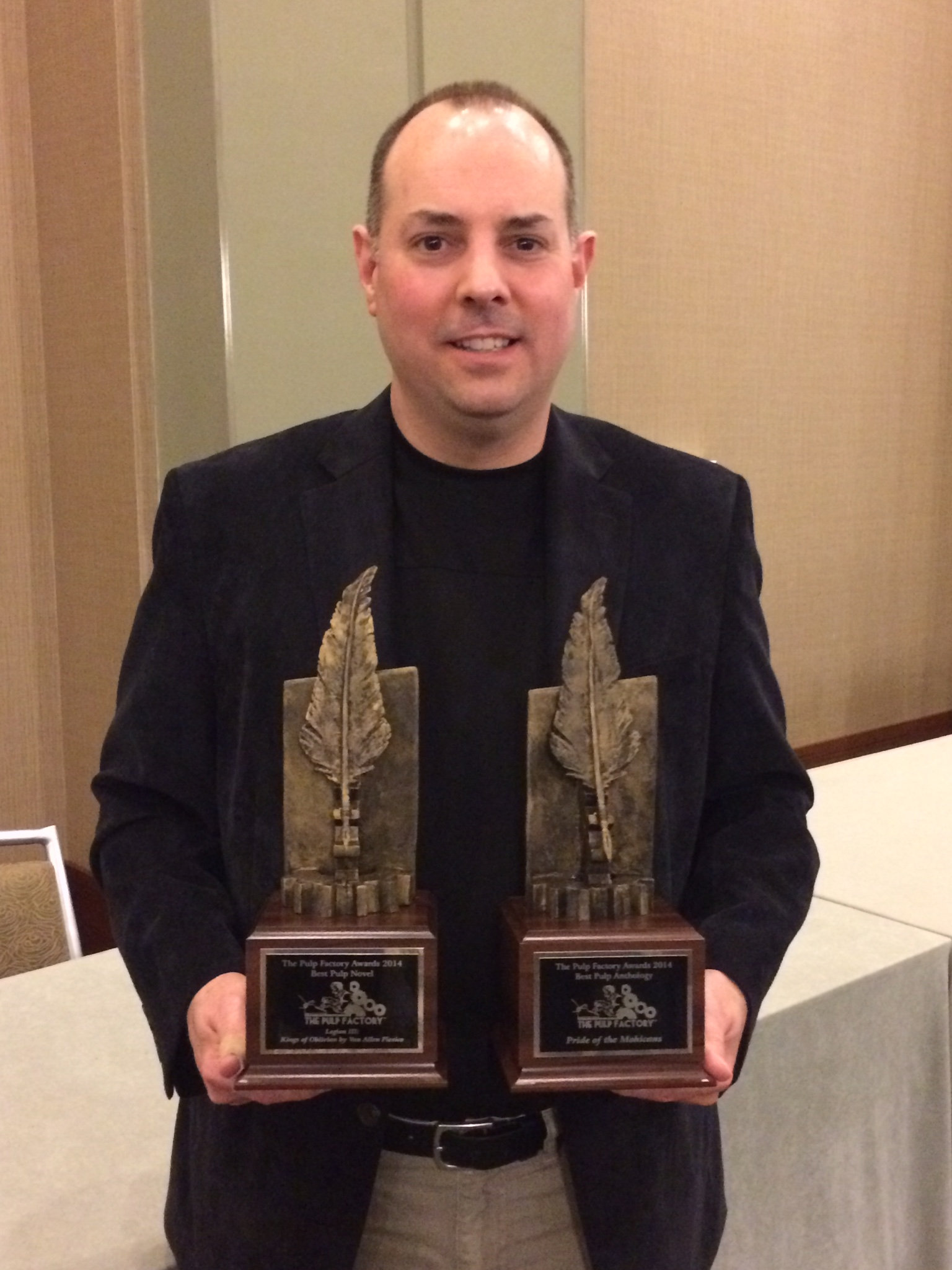
Van Plexico with Trophies at Windy City Pulp Con 2015

Plexico has won seven awards for his science fiction and New Pulp writing, as well as being named a Pulp Grand Master:

- "John Blackthorn" won the 2012 New Pulp Award for Best New Pulp Character.
- Legion III: Kings of Oblivion won the 2015 Pulp Factory Award for Pulp Novel of the Year.
- Pride of the Mohicans, an anthology created by and edited by Plexico, won the 2015 Pulp Factory Award for Pulp Anthology of the Year.
- Sentinels: The Dark Crusade won the 2017 Pulp Factory Award for Pulp Novel of the Year.
- Vegas Heist won the 2019 Pulp Factory Award for Pulp Novel of the Year.
- Miami Heist won the 2021 Imadjinn Award for Thriller Novel of the Year.
- Validus V won the 2023 Pulp Factory Award for Pulp Novel of the Year.
- Unanimously voted the third-ever Pulp Grand Master by the Pulp Factory in 2025.

In addition, his science fiction novel Legion I: Lords of Fire was a shortlisted finalist for the 2014 Pulp Factory Award (Pulp Novel of the Year), Sentinels: Vendetta was a shortlisted finalist for the 2018 Pulp Factory Award (Pulp Novel of the Year), Miami Heist was a shortlisted finalist for the 2020 Pulp Factory Award (Pulp Novel of the Year), and "The Red Flame of Death" was a finalist for Short Story of the Year in the same awards in 2010. He was also a finalist for the New Pulp Award for Author of the Year in both 2011 and 2012.

== The Sentinels Series ==
Beginning in 2006, Plexico began writing a multi-volume series of Superhero fiction novels and anthologies. The books are set in the modern day, but include major elements of space opera. The central character of the series is a teen-aged Asian-American woman who discovers she possesses electromagnetic powers and becomes involved with a US government-run organization known as Project: Sentinel. Each volume of the series stands alone as a single adventure but the books can be read together as an ongoing, continuous narrative in which the characters grow and change. As of 2017, the series stands at ten volumes (nine novels and one anthology). The 2016 volume, the novel The Dark Crusade, won Novel of the Year at the Pulp Factory Awards. The most recent volume, Vendetta, was published by White Rocket Books in May 2017. The seventh volume was published in 2012 and hit #1 on the New Pulp Best Sellers chart in its second week of release.

== Bibliography ==
- Sentinels: When Strikes the Warlord (WRB edition, 2006; Swarm Press edition, 2008), ISBN 1-934861-06-5
- The Complete Avengers 1963-Present Trading Card Set (Writer of the back-of-cards text, Upper Deck/Rittenhouse Archives, 2006)
- Sentinels: A Distant Star (WRB edition, 2007; Swarm Press edition, 2008), ISBN 1-934861-07-3
- Sentinels: Apocalypse Rising (WRB edition, 2007; Swarm Press edition, 2008), ISBN 1-934861-08-1
- Assembled! Five Decades of Earth’s Mightiest (Editor, 2007), ISBN 978-0-615-15444-2
- Sentinels: Widescreen Special Edition (Author and Editor, limited edition deluxe hardcover, 2007)
- Sentinels: The Grand Design (Author and Editor, limited edition omnibus paperback, 2007)
- "The Spearhead of Invasion" in A Thousand Faces magazine , issue 3 (2008)
- "Conspiracy of Terror" (A Griffon novella) in Thrilling Tales magazine , issue 1 (2008)
- "Future Shocked" in A Thousand Faces magazine , issue 7 (2009)
- Sentinels: Alternate Visions (Editor, anthology, 2009), ISBN 978-0-578-01120-2
- The John Carter of Mars Trilogy of Edgar Rice Burroughs (Reprint Editor for White Rocket Books, 2009)
- Introduction to A Princess of Mars by Edgar Rice Burroughs (White Rocket Books edition, 2009)
- Super Comics Trivia! (Editor, 2009), ISBN 978-1-4421-1091-5
- "The Problem at Stamford Bridge" and "The Adventure of the Tuvan Delegate" in Sherlock Holmes: Consulting Detective, Vol. 1 (Airship 27 Productions/Cornerstone Books; anthology, 2009), ISBN 978-1-934935-50-7
- Lucian: Dark God's Homecoming (Airship 27 Productions/Cornerstone Books; novel, 2009), ISBN 978-1-934935-44-6
- Assembled! 2 (White Rocket Books, editor, 2009) ISBN 978-0-9841392-0-0
- Sentinels: The Shiva Advent (White Rocket Books, 2009) ISBN 978-0-9841392-1-7
- "Conspiracy of Terror" in Lance Star - Sky Ranger, Vol. 2 (Airship 27 Productions/ Cornerstone Books; anthology, 2009) ISBN 978-1-934935-61-3
- Sentinels: Worldmind (White Rocket Books, 2010) ISBN 978-0-9841392-2-4
- Introduction to The Boston Bombers graphic novel by Ron Fortier (Red Bud Studios, 2010)
- Gideon Cain - Demon Hunter, Vol. 1 (Airship 27 Productions; co-creator, co-editor, contributor; anthology, 2010) ISBN 978-1-934935-74-3
- "Godslayers" in Peculiar Adventures, Vol. 1 (Pro Se Press, pulp magazine, 2010)
- Season of Our Dreams (White Rocket Books; co-author; sports commentary, 2011) ISBN 978-0-9841392-3-1
- Mars McCoy, Space Ranger, Vol. 1 (Airship 27 Productions; co-creator and asst. editor; anthology, 2011) ISBN 978-1-934935-87-3
- Sentinels: Stellarax (White Rocket Books, 2011) ISBN 978-0-9841392-4-8
- "The Audacity of Hope: A Look Back on the 1994 Streak" in Maple Street Press Tigers Kickoff 2011 (Maple Street Press, sports commentary, 2011)
- "Thunder Over China" in Lance Star, Sky Ranger, Vol. 3 (Airship 27 Productions, anthology, 2011) ISBN 978-1-61342-015-7
- Blackthorn: Thunder on Mars (White Rocket Books; creator, editor, contributor; anthology, 2011) ISBN 978-0-9841392-6-2
- "Hawk: Hand of the Machine, Part 1" in Pro Se Presents, Issue 7 (Pro Se Press, pulp magazine, February 2012 issue) ISBN 978-1-4701-2654-4
- "Hawk: Hand of the Machine, Part 2" in Pro Se Presents, Issue 8 (Pro Se Press, pulp magazine, March 2012 issue) ISBN 978-1-4750-3482-0
- Hawk: Hand of the Machine (White Rocket Books, novel, 2012) ISBN 978-0-6156413-1-7
- Sentinels: The Grand Design (White Rocket Books, omnibus collection of volumes 1–3, 2012) ISBN 978-0-984-13925-5
- "The River of Deceit" in Monster Aces (Pro Se Press, anthology, 2012) ISBN 978-1-480-18738-2
- Sentinels: The Rivals (White Rocket Books, omnibus collection of volumes 4–6, 2012) ISBN 978-0-984-13927-9
- Sentinels: Metalgod (White Rocket Books, 2012) ISBN 978-0-6157339-0-6
- "Vengeance of the Viper" in The New Adventures of the Griffon (Pro Se Press, anthology, 2013) ISBN 978-1-48200-408-3
- The Shattering, Legion I: Lords of Fire (White Rocket Books, novel, 2013) ISBN 978-0-61575-419-2
- Decades of Dominance: Auburn Football in the Modern Era (White Rocket Books, co-author, sports commentary, 2013) ISBN 978-0984139286
- "The Devil You Know" in All-Star Pulp Comics Volume 2 (Red Bud Studios, graphic novel anthology, 2013)
- Mars McCoy, Space Ranger, Vol. 2 (Airship 27 Productions; co-creator, asst. editor and contributor, anthology, 2013) ISBN 978-0615838090
- MULTIPLEX: The Collected Stories of Van Allen Plexico (White Rocket Books, omnibus collection of short stories, 2013) ISBN 978-0615935430
- The Shattering, Legion II: Sons of Terra (White Rocket Books, novel, 2014) ISBN 978-0615973456
- Pride of the Mohicans (White Rocket Books, editor, anthology, 2014) ISBN 978-0692202357
- The Shattering, Legion III: Kings of Oblivion (White Rocket Books, novel, 2014) ISBN 978-0692021453
- Alpha/Omega, Episode 1: Hostile Takeover (Pro Se Press, novella, 2014) ASIN B00NMP8IPY
- The Shattering (White Rocket Books, Omnibus collection of Legion novels, 2014) ISBN 978-0692021460
- Alpha/Omega, Episode 2: The Smartest Man on the Moon (Pro Se Press, novella, 2015) ASIN B00SO0E2CU
- Cold Lightning (White Rocket Books, novella, 2015) ASIN B00UPLUZZY
- Baranak: Storming the Gates (White Rocket Books, novel, 2015) ISBN 978-0692474822
- "Renegade" in Legends of New Pulp Fiction (Airship 27 Productions, anthology, 2015) ISBN 978-0692601136
- "The Red Flame of Death" in All These Shiny Worlds (Creativity Hacker Press, anthology, 2016) ASIN B01B8IZIM2
- Sentinels: The Dark Crusade (White Rocket Books, novel, 2016) ISBN 978-0984139293
- Sentinels: Vendetta (White Rocket Books, novel, 2017) ISBN 978-1546517832
- Sentinels: The Art of Chris Kohler (White Rocket Books, editor and contributor, 2017) ISBN 978-1548867454
- Sentinels: The Earth-Kur-Bai War (White Rocket Books, omnibus collection of volumes 7–9, 2018) ISBN 978-1721688487
- Vegas Heist (White Rocket Books, novel, 2018) ISBN 978-1986391429
- Karilyne: Heart Cold as Ice (White Rocket Books, novel, 2019) ISBN 978-1795211536
- Alpha/Omega (Pro Se Press, novel, 2019) ISBN 978-1080850365
- "The Long Crawl of Jonas Kanadee" in Salvage Conquest: Tales from the Salvage Title Universe (Theogony Books, anthology, 2019) ISBN 978-1950420599
- Miami Heist (White Rocket Books, novel, 2020) ISBN 979-8654096463
- We Believed: A Lifetime of Auburn Football, Vol 1, 1975-1998 (White Rocket Books, co-author, sports commentary, 2021) ISBN 979-8536996751
- Gideon Cain: Demon Hunter: Revised and Expanded Edition (White Rocket Books, anthology, 2022) ISBN 979-8836435004
- Validus-V (White Rocket Books, novel, 2022) ISBN 979-8841938194
- Auburn Basketball: From Barkley to Bruce (White Rocket Books, co-author, sports commentary, 2022) ISBN 979-8353194996
- "A Voice in the Wilderness" in Galloping Around the Cosmos (Becky Books, television commentary, 2023) ISBN 979-8861630771
- First Time Ever: The Untold Story of How Auburn First Brought Undefeated Alabama to Jordan-Hare Stadium--and Beat Them (White Rocket Books, co-author, sports commentary, 2023) ISBN 978-1962993012
- Union: A Novel of Invasion and Resistance (White Rocket Books, novel, 2024) ISBN 978-1962993104
- Alpha/Omega: Revised and Expanded Director's Cut (White Rocket Books, novel, 2024) ISBN 978-1962993128
- "That Other Claremont/Byrne Comic" in Walking the Wider Web: A Fan's Journey Through One of Comics' Greatest Series (Becky Books, comics commentary, 2024) ISBN 979-8334677654
- All They Did Was Win: Shootouts, Shockers and Cambacks on the Road to Auburn's Improbable 2010 National Championship (White Rocket Books, co-author, sports commentary, 2025) ISBN 978-1-962993-13-5
