= The New Girl (Stine novel) =

Book by R.L. Stine

- First edition cover of The New Girl
- Author: R. L. Stine
- Language: English
- Series: Fear Street
- Genre: Horror fiction
- Published: Simon Pulse (1989)
- Publication place: United States
- Media type: Print (paperback)
- Followed by: The Surprise Party

The New Girl is the first novel in R. L. Stine's Fear Street series. It was published in August 1989, making it one of the earliest horror novels written by Stine.

== Plot ==
Cory falls in love with Anna, the new girl at his high school. As he attempts to learn more about her, he finds that his friends do not recognize her, he cannot find her in the school files, and a phone call to her family results in someone on the other end insisting that Anna is dead.

Cory visits Anna's house on Fear Street where he is met by a man who, again, insists that she is dead. A few nights later, Anna calls him asking to meet her, implying she needs his help. He is convinced she is real by her humanlike kisses.

After another girl asks Cory to go to the prom, she finds a dead cat in her locker with a warning note attached to its neck. She suspects Anna, but Cory stands by her. At the dance Lisa is pushed down a flight of stairs by Anna's brother, Brad, who escapes capture after seeing that Lisa survived the fall.

Cory travels to Anna's house to confront Brad soon after, where he finds Anna and Brad fighting. It is revealed that Anna is actually Willa, Anna's sister who had killed her out of jealousy and assumed her identity. Cory and Brad manage to subdue "Anna" and call the police. In the end, it is implied that Cory begins a relationship with Lisa, which is confirmed in subsequent novels featuring appearances by the characters.

== Publication ==
The New Girl was first published by Simon Pulse in 1989, and reprinted in 1992.

It was one of twelve Fear Street books that were reprinted in 2006. In 2020, it was reprinted again in a four-book volume containing three subsequent entries in the Fear Street series: The Surprise Party, The Overnight, and Missing.

== Reception ==
School Library Journal commented that "the vocabulary is simple, the premise interesting, and the plot compelling, making this book one for reluctant readers". In contrast, Publishers Weekly described this book as "a tame offering". R. J. Carter from The Trades commented that it was "a fine example of the crazed killer tales that teens love to spook each other with in the wee hours of the night".
