= Worldwar: Striking the Balance =

Book by Harry Turtledove

- First edition
- Author: Harry Turtledove
- Cover artist: Stan Watts
- Language: English
- Series: Worldwar
- Genre: Alternate history/Science fiction
- Publisher: Del Rey Books
- Publication date: November 5, 1996
- Publication place: United States
- Pages: 465 (hardcover edition)
- ISBN: 0-345-40550-1
- OCLC: 34798124
- Dewey Decimal: 813/.54 20
- LC Class: PS3570.U76 W65 1996
- Preceded by: Worldwar: Upsetting the Balance
- Followed by: Colonization: Second Contact

Worldwar: Striking the Balance is an alternate history novel by American writer Harry Turtledove. It is the fourth and final novel of the Worldwar tetralogy. It is also the fourth installment in the extended Worldwar series, which includes the Colonization trilogy and the novel Homeward Bound.

In this book, while the Race considers total annihilation or continuing hostilities, the humans make a stand for the sovereignty of the planet.

== Plot summary ==
At the beginning of 1944, the Battle of Chicago has ended with the Race's forces decimated as a result of an American atomic bomb detonated in the heart of the city, destroying most of it. German forces in Western Europe have successfully kept the Race from reaching the Rhine and managed to hurl back the Race's troops in Poland after a nuclear attack on Breslau. The Soviets have managed to stop the Race's assault on Moscow and accepted the surrender of a band of disillusioned alien soldiers. After a landing in the United Kingdom, Winston Churchill inflicted a massive victory against the Race by using mustard gas, gaining much abandoned technology, and inspiring other nations to use poison gas.

The United States attempts to reverse engineer captured Race technology in an effort to create ballistic missiles at a military base in Couch, Missouri. Sergeant Yeager attempts to help Robert Goddard and other scientists with that research by interrogating captured aliens. By now, Yeager has become an expert translator of the Race's language, making him an invaluable asset to Goddard. In the process of his work, Yeager has developed a friendship with two of the alien prisoners: Ristin and Ulhass. Both members of the Race show an alarming adaptability to American customs, learning to play baseball and adopting human slang, along with a surprising willingness to help their human captors.

The Race has apparently lost interest in Chicago and seeks instead to capture Denver. Captain Rance Auerbach is among the US Army soldiers who are ordered to try to halt the new offensive. However, the Race's superior firepower and mobility crush American resistance with relative ease. During the fighting, Rance is critically wounded and incapacitated. He awakens in a refugee hospital to find that the Race is advancing rapidly on Denver. General Omar Bradley prepares defenses around Denver; as the site of America's nuclear weapons program, it must be defended at all costs. Fortunately, Brigadier General Groves and the metallurgical laboratory manage to produce an atomic bomb, which they use to halt the Race. Fleetlord Atvar considers a nuclear strike against Denver in retaliation but decides against it since the nuclear fallout would harm the Race's forces. Instead, he orders the detonation of one over the front lines in Florida, causing the collapse of the entire American position in that state. Americans are upset by the recent death of President Franklin Roosevelt, and Atvar hopes that will cause a succession crisis, tearing the United States apart, but that does not happen inasmuch as the Presidency is smoothly transferred to US Secretary of State Cordell Hull.

The US Army, under the command of General George Patton, launches a counteroffensive down the Mississippi River that slowly liberates it from the Race. It manages to reach Quincy, Illinois, but begin taking higher and higher casualties as it progresses. The first American ballistic missiles are also launched against the Race, but they are so crude and unsophisticated that they do little damage against the invaders. Many of the missiles are easily destroyed by the Race's anti-missile systems. However, stocks of anti-missile weapons are low since the Race already expended many to shoot down German missiles. The speed with which the Americans and Germans have developed such weapons stuns and frightens the Race.

In Poland, the Wehrmacht continues its advance eastward toward Łódź. However, as they get deeper and deeper into Polish territory, it encounters Jewish partisans whose sympathies lean toward the Race. Mordechai Anielewicz and his fellow Jews do not trust the Germans and do not wish to see them in control of Poland, but they do not wish to see the Race rule the world either. That situation is exacerbated by the realization that Soviet forces in Ukraine are slowly making their way toward Poland as well. No one is sure what will happen if and when the Wehrmacht and the Red Army meet on the battlefield.

Colonel Heinrich Jäger, a tank commander who has had experience with the partisans, manages to convince Anielewicz that the German forces will not repeat their previous persecution of the Jews. For a time, the Wehrmacht and the partisans manage to work together against the Race.

The Kriegsmarine manages to destroy Alexandria with an atomic bomb on board a type XXI Elektroboote U-boat. The attack shocks the Race, because it is unaware of the type XXI's existence and so does not see how the bomb could have been transported close enough to Alexandria to destroy the city and also because of its proximity to the Race's capital, Cairo. The Race destroys Copenhagen in retaliation.

In the wake of recent setbacks, especially a Soviet nuclear attack on the Race's forces in Saratov, Fleetlord Atvar agrees to meet with human diplomats from the Soviet Union, the United Kingdom, Germany, Japan, and the United States for the purpose of negotiating an armistice. Vyacheslav Molotov, Joachim von Ribbentrop, Anthony Eden, Shigenori Tōgō, and George Marshall head to Cairo, the Race's capital, to negotiate with Atvar. However, the chances for peace are severely endangered when Hitler secretly plans to resume hostilities by launching a surprise attack against the Race in Poland.

Jäger is relieved that the fighting has stopped and hopes that it will achieve a lasting peace. However, Hitler sends SS agents into Poland that are led by Otto Skorzeny and immediately begin to cause friction between the local Poles, the Jewish partisans, and the Wehrmacht. To Jäger, Skorzeny privately makes comments that allude to the fact that Hitler has not, by any means, abandoned his plans for the Final Solution.

Jäger grows steadily distrustful of Skorzeny and seeks to prevent the SS and Nazis from turning against the Jewish partisans. He establishes a line of communication to the partisans through a Polish farmer, Karol. When Jäger learns that Hitler plans use the negotiations in Cairo as a distraction to detonate an atomic bomb in Łódź, he is shocked and disgusted. Jäger gets word to Anielewicz about the bomb through Karol. Anielewicz and his fellow partisans manage to find and disable the weapon. The Wehrmacht moves into position for the offensive. When Skorzeny activates the weapon's detonator, nothing happens. Furious, Skorzeny heads into Łódź to discern the problem.

In Cairo, a distraught Joachim von Ribbentrop announces his government's decision to continue the war to the confused delegates. Ribbentrop is relieved when Atvar tells him that no reports of an attack in Poland have been made.

When Jäger finds Karol tortured to death with SS runes burned onto his chest and his wife and daughter brutally raped and murdered, he realizes that his cover is blown. Soon after returning to camp, he is detained by SS men and interrogated.

Somewhere in Poland, Ludmila Gorbunova crash lands while trying to deliver supplies to partisans, as the partisans forgot about a pine tree in the middle of the runway. She runs into it, wrecks her aircraft, and gets little or no help from the locals, who are largely unable and unwilling to aid a Soviet pilot. The Jewish partisan Ignacy eventually manages to help her locate a working Fieseler Storch. She takes off with the intent of returning to the Soviet Union after her extended stay in Estonia.

By a shocking coincidence, Ludmila arrives at an airfield in the same location that Jäger is being held captive. Jäger's tank crewmen recognize Ludmila as the woman with whom he is involved. Fearing what will happen to their commander if he is interrogated by the SS, the tank crewmen inform Ludmila about his fate and ask for her help. She readily offers her assistance. The Wehrmacht soldiers kill the SS men guarding Jäger and lead him to Ludmilla's plane. The two take off before anyone realizes Jäger has escaped.

Jäger explains Hitler's plan to Ludmila, and they make their way to Łódź. There they make contact with Anielewicz and tell him about Skorzeny. All three head to the condemned building in which the bomb is being guarded by partisans. They find the Jewish guard dead. Upon entering the building, Skorzeny attacks them with nerve gas and a submachine gun. Jäger is carrying a medical kit with an antidote to the toxin and manages to inject himself, Ludmila, and Anielewicz with it. They manage to kill Skorzeny and avert the detonation of the bomb.

In Cairo, the Race reaches an accord with the human powers. The Race will completely withdraw from the territories under the control of the United States, the Soviet Union, and Germany in 1942, with the exception of Poland, which the Race intends to hold as a buffer state between Germany and the Soviet Union. Atvar is willing to suspend hostilities with Germany, the Soviet Union, the United States, Britain, and Japan. Atvar has no intention of returning any part of the British Empire to the United Kingdom except Canada, which the Race considers to be uninhabitable because of its cold climate; Newfoundland, which joins Canada; and New Zealand, which is spared because of the Race's tendency to overlook islands. Australia was fully conquered after the atomic bombing of Sydney and Melbourne. The war ends, but fighting continues in the territories that the Race still controls, especially in China, where a determined communist insurgency, led by Mao Zedong seeks liberation. Also, the Red Army continues to mop up remnant German units from the German invasion.

It is clear that the peace is only temporary. The Race has not recognized the right of the human powers to their own independence and still officially intends to conquer the entire world at a later date. Nazi Germany is apparently still eager to use force to drive the Race off the planet completely but perhaps not in the immediate future. In the Soviet Union, Stalin assures Molotov that war with the Race and the other human powers is inevitable, especially since a second wave of alien colonists is expected to reach earth by the 1960s. The ruined United States begins the long process of reconstruction.

== Characters ==
See list of Worldwar characters for fictional and historical characters.

== References to actual history and current sciences ==
Turtledove is careful to avoid any elaborate technical details about the Race's technology. However, from the descriptions given in the novel, it is possible to surmise that much of the technology used by the Race is not only feasible but also common at the start of the 21st century.

The military equipment of the Race is almost entirely analogous to human technology. Its primary ground forces are composed of tanks and mechanized infantry with supporting self-propelled artillery and gunships. In one respect, at least, the Race's military equipment is actually inferior to human technology, that being naval warfare. Since the Race's homeworld has only a few large lakes and rivers, it never developed the sophisticated warships of the human forces. Battleships and aircraft carriers particularly strike the Race as literally unimaginable. In addition, the Race was caught completely off-guard by the use of chemical weapons, such as mustard gas to the point of not having any countermeasures such as gas masks. As a result, it is possible that the Race never used chemical weapons in its pre-unification wars or that the use of such weapons and the information that they ever existed has been removed via censorship from the historical record at some point during its around 25,000 Earth-years of unification.

The air forces are not fundamentally different from human air forces in terms of tactics and doctrine, being based primarily on the concept of achieving air superiority through the use of fighters. From a technical standpoint, the Race's aircraft have a tremendous advantage over human planes in that they are powered by turbine engines, but most human aircraft in mid-20th century were propeller-driven.

The Race apparently use several theoretically-feasible but not-yet-achieved technologies, namely nuclear fusion power and interstellar travel. Turtledove describes the alien vessels making the journey from Tau Ceti to Earth in twenty years, implying that they can travel at half of the speed of light. Vessels of the Race seems to create artificial gravity by means of rotation. During long interstellar travels, part or all of a ship's crew is placed in suspended animation by some unexplained method of artificial metabolic arrest, which is referred to simply as cold sleep.
