= Siegfried Macholz =

German general (1890–1975)

- Born: 20 September 1890; Memel, East Prussia (modern Klaipeda, Lithuania)
- Died: 25 May 1975 (aged 84); Hanover, West Germany
- Military career
- Allegiance: German Empire; Weimar Republic); Nazi Germany
- Branch: Army
- Service years: 1909–1921; 1935–1945
- Rank: Generalleutnant
- Commands: Division Nr. 192; 122. Infanterie-Division; 191. Reserve-Division; 49. Infanterie-Division; 295. Infanterie-Division
- Conflicts: World War II
- Awards: Knight's Cross of the Iron Cross

Siegfried Macholz (20 September 1890 – 25 May 1975) was a general in the Wehrmacht of Nazi Germany during World War II. He was a recipient of the Knight's Cross of the Iron Cross.

== Awards and decorations ==
- German Cross in Gold on 19 December 1941 as Generalmajor and commander 122. Infanterie-Division
- Knight's Cross of the Iron Cross on 16 October 1944 as Generalleutnant and commander of 49. Infanterie-Division

Military offices
Preceded by None	Commander of Division Nr. 192; 10 June 1940 - 5 October 1940	Succeeded by General der Infanterie Hans Petri
Preceded by None	Commander of 122. Infanterie-Division; 5 October 1940 - 8 December 1941	Succeeded by Generalleutnant Friedrich Bayer
Preceded by Generalleutnant Friedrich Bayer	Commander of 122. Infanterie-Division; 17 February 1942 - 1 August 1942	Succeeded by Generalleutnant Kurt Chill
Preceded by Generalleutnant Gustav Hundt	Commander of 122. Infanterie-Division ? November 1942 - 1 December 1942	Succeeded by Generalmajor Adolf Trowitz
Preceded by Generalmajor Karl von Dewitz gennant von Krebs	Commander of 191. Reserve-Division; 1 March 1943 - 1 January 1944	Succeeded by Generalleutnant Erich Bäßler
Preceded by Unknown	Commander of 49. Infanterie-Division ? February 1944 - 4 September 1944	Succeeded by Generalleutnant Vollrath Lübbe
Preceded by Generalleutnant Karl Rhein	Commander of 295. Infanterie-Division; 26 January 1945 - 8 May 1945	Succeeded by None
