= Worldwar: Upsetting the Balance =

Book by Harry Turtledove

- First edition
- Author: Harry Turtledove
- Cover artist: Stan Watts
- Language: English
- Series: Worldwar
- Genre: Alternate history/Science fiction
- Publisher: Del Rey Books
- Publication date: January 1, 1996
- Publication place: United States
- Pages: 481 (hardcover edition)
- ISBN: 0-345-40221-9
- OCLC: 32818955
- Dewey Decimal: 813/.54 20
- LC Class: PS3570.U76 W67 1996
- Preceded by: Worldwar: Tilting the Balance
- Followed by: Worldwar: Striking the Balance

Worldwar: Upsetting the Balance is an alternate history novel by American writer Harry Turtledove. It is the third novel of the Worldwar tetralogy and the third installment in the extended Worldwar series, which includes the Colonization trilogy and the novel Homeward Bound.

In this book, now armed with nuclear weapons, the United States and Nazi Germany strike back at the invading aliens known as The Race.

== Plot summary ==
The United States and Germany develop atomic weapons of their own and, alongside the Soviets, engage in a nuclear exchange with the Race. The Soviets may have detonated the first atomic bomb, but it was only because their original sample of plutonium, which had been captured from the Race, was larger than the samples that were given to the US and Germany. The Soviets actually lag far behind the two other countries in their efforts to make their own plutonium, and they used all of it in the atomic bomb they used south of Moscow to stop the Race's main thrust against the city.

Regardless, the Race is in a full state of panic that humans have been able to detonate an atomic weapon, and many commanders are shocked at the number of the Race's soldiers that died in the blast. Straha, third in command of the Conquest Fleet, demands a vote of no confidence in Fleetlord Atvar by the captains of each ship in the Fleet. Such a vote would require a 75% majority to depose Atvar, but the vote falls short at 69%. Atvar remains in control, but he recognizes that most of the shiplords no longer actively support him. Furious at Straha, he orders the shiplord's arrest, but Straha, one step ahead of him, defects to the United States, enraging Atvar and allowing the Americans access to a spaceship of the Race.

Soon, the Race launches an invasion of the British home islands by air from southern France by flying over German-held north France, and it occupies a northern area, which seems to be centered on Oxfordshire and includes Northampton, and a southern area, which seems to be centered on western Sussex. The humans hold onto Market Harborough; parts of the story describe fighting around Brixworth, Scaldwell, and Spratton, villages that are on the front line between Northampton and Market Harborough. Another section describes an artillery and tank battle for Henley-on-Thames. The human forces are exposed to fire from the Race's helicopter gunships. The Race ignores warnings from Winston Churchill that such an attack will meet with terrible consequences. The Race's forces in Britain are subjected to another human weapon they did not anticipate: mustard gas. Totally unprepared for a chemical attack by the humans, the invasion force is devastated and thrown back: a plan to link its two areas through Maidenhead fails. London suffers heavy bombardment and causes the destruction or heavy damage of many landmarks, including Palace of Westminster and Big Ben, which survived the real-world German Blitz. The northern pocket is obliterated, and the southern pocket evacuates in a hurry by air through Tangmere, which is the Race's last airfield in Britain out of range of human artillery. As a result, the British gain access to much intact Race technology, which was abandoned in the retreat. The British use of mustard gas also inspires the Germans, Americans, and Russians to use poison gas against the Race. The German use of poison gas includes the use of sarin and tabun.

China's communist guerrillas also escalate the conflict against the Race.

In one of the Race's bases in Siberia, morale is at an all-time low. The weather is a truly miserable condition from the hot one that the Race is used to, and the Race's soldiers feel that they are constantly being sent to their deaths by incompetent commanders. Many have fallen into abusing ginger, which works as a narcotic for them, even though it has been outlawed by Atvar's orders; such disobedience would have been considered unthinkable before they came to Earth. The Race's soldiers are pushed to the breaking point, and when the base commander starts berating the garrison yet again, the landcruiser driver Ussmak shoots him in the head to silence him, and an insurrection starts. The entire Race base mutinies and makes Ussmak its de facto leader.

== See also ==
- List of Worldwar characters
