= LXXXIV Army Corps =

- Active: 15 May 1942–September 1944
- Country: Nazi Germany
- Branch: Army
- Role: Coastal defence and fortification
- Size: Corps
- Engagements: Normandy landings; Falaise Pocket

The LXXXIV Army Corps (German: LXXXIV. Armeekorps) was an army corps of the German Wehrmacht during World War II. It was formed in 1942 and existed until 1944.

The LXXXIV Army Corps is most notable as the formation that guarded the landing grounds of the Allied Normandy landings.

== History ==
=== Before the Allied invasion ===
The LXXXIV Army Corps was formed on 15 May 1942 by renaming Höheres Kommando z. b. V. LX. In turn, the Higher Command z. b. V. LX had been formed on 15 October 1940 in Prague. The initial commander of the LXXXIV was Hans Behlendorff. The corps was subordinate to the 7th Army under Army Group D, and stationed in Saint-Lô in Normandy. Behlendorff was succeeded as corps commander by Gustav-Adolf von Zangen on 1 April 1943. Zangen was succeeded as corps commander by Erich Marcks on 1 August 1943.

With the Allied invasion imminent, LXXXIV Army Corps reported in late May 1944 that only half of the winter programme had been fulfilled and that many coastal batteries were still left to be installed. By March 1944, between 50 and 80% of the required fortifications in the area of the LXXXIV Army Corps had been operational.

Shortly after midnight on 6 June 1944, Allied airborne landings began at the Orne river and on the Cotentin peninsula. The LXXXIV Army Corps was subsequently put to high alert to react to the ongoing Allied invasion.

=== After 6 June 1944 ===
Because of its position within the German Atlantic Wall, the LXXXIV Army Corps was the first formation to respond to the Normandy landings by the western Allies. The forces of the 352nd Infantry Division (Dietrich Kraiss), headquartered at Le Molay-Littry, and of the 716th Infantry Division (Wilhelm Richter), headquartered at Caen, were closest to the Allied eastern landing sites. Clearly the US Airborne had landed from 0130 onwards in the west on the Cherbourg peninsular therefore long before the first sea landings at 0730.

The forces available to the corps on invasion day were the:

- 243rd Infantry Division
- 319th Infantry Division
- 352nd Infantry Division
- 709th Infantry Division
- 716th Infantry Division

Of these, the 243rd, 319th, 709th and 716th were bodenständig (static), i.e. insufficiently equipped with motorized vehicles and intended for non-mobile operations. Only the 352nd Division did not carry the designation bodenständig, and was the only formidable fighting force under control of LXXXIV Army Corps. The situation was further complicated by the fact that the 319th Infantry Division was guarding the Channel Islands and would be unavailable for the fighting in Normandy. The 21st Panzer Division, although not directly subordinate to the LXXXIV Army Corps, was stationed nearby at Saint-Pierre-sur-Dives.

On 12 June, corps commander Erich Marcks was killed in action. He was succeeded by Wilhelm Fahrmbacher, who was on 15 June replaced in turn by Dietrich von Choltitz.

By 24 July, the Allied landing ground had expanded to include Caen, Balleroy, Saint-Lô and La Haye-du-Puits. The LXXXIV, now supported by and supervising the II Parachute Corps, stood as part of the 7th Army on the left German flank north of Coutances. The LXXXIV Army Corps stood opposite the, from left to right from the German perspective, VIII U.S. Corps, VII U.S. Corps, XIX U.S. Corps and V U.S. Corps.

The Allied breakout from Normandy began on 25 July, when the 3rd U.S. Army, which became the Twelfth United States Army Group beginning 1 August, broke the positions of the LXXXIV Army Corps and penetrated the German left. The Allied troops reached Countaces by 28 July, Granville and Avranches by 31 July and advanced over Pontaubault into Brittany beginning on 1 August. The LXXXIV Army Corps was hindered in its operational capabilities by the Allied bombing campaign against the French railways. At the beginning of the Allied operation, less than two days of fuel were available for the forces of the corps.

On 28 July, the LXXXIV Army Corps was ordered by Paul Hausser, now in command of the 7th Army, to retreat southeast to strengthen the German frontline. As a result, there were even fewer German forces on the southern flank to oppose the advancing American forces.

Otto Elfeldt about his appointment as commander of LXXXIV Army Corps

"It was on the 28th July [1944], so far as I remember, that orders came for me to go at once to Field-Marshal von Kluge's headquarters. On arrival he told me that I was to take over command of the 84th Corps from General von Choltitzs. He said he did not agree with the defence policy of the latter, but did not say in what respect. The Corps, he told me, comprised the remnants of seven divisions. He also said that the 116th Panzer Division was to counter-attack westward to relieve the pressure, and would be under my command."

— Basil Liddell-Hart, The Other Side of the Hill: Germany's Generals, their Rise and Fall, with their own Account of Military Events, 1939-1945. Delhi: Army Publishers. pp. 351–352.

Choltitz was replaced as corps commander by Otto Elfeldt on 30 July. Elfeldt later gave testimony about his time as commander of the LXXXIV Army Corps to British historian B. H. Liddell Hart. Günther von Kluge, commander of Army Group D, blamed Choltitz for the German defeat in Normandy and thus saw him removed in favor of Elfeldt.

By 5 August, the LXXXIV Army Corps had been forced back to Barenton and Le Teilleul, where it now stood on the left flank of the XLVII Panzer Corps. Now, the Allied forces began to bypass the German forces in the south to create the Falaise Pocket. The XV U.S. Corps and XX U.S. Corps outflanked the LXXXI Army Corps near Javron-les-Chapelles and marched south of the 7th Army to capture Beaumont-sur-Sarthe by 10 August while the VII U.S. Corps pinned down the Germans at Javron. Having captured Beaumont, the XV and XX U.S. Corps could advance effectively unhindered into the territory southeast of the German positions. The XV corps captured Carrouges, Alençon and Mortagne-au-Perche and attacked Argentan by 16 August, whereas the XX Corps, with the XII U.S. Corps on its right starting on 13 August, reached Chartres by 16 August, the same day that the XII Corps further south took Orléans.

By 16 August, the German forces were stuck in a small cauldron between Falaise, Chambois and Argentan, with the LXXXIV Army Corps and its superior 7th Army stuck just east of Flers and Condé-sur-Noireau. A German relief thrust allowed parts of the 7th Army to escape on 20 August, after which the Germans took a new defensive line far to the northeast, from Elbeuf over Les Andelys to Versailles by 25 August. The Allied Liberation of Paris was completed on that day.

The LXXXIV Army Corps did however not escape from the Falaise Pocket. Otto Elfeldt was taken prisoner on 29 August.

Starting in September 1944, the LXXXIV Army Corps was marked as status unknown (German: Verbleib unbekannt) in German documents. The corps was formally dissolved on 2 November 1944.

== Structure ==
Organizational chart of the LXXXIV (84th) Army Corps of the Wehrmacht
Year	Date	Commander	Subordinate units
1942	8 June	Hans Behlendorff	319th Infantry, 320th Infantry, 716th Infantry. 7th Air
1942	4 July	Hans Behlendorff	319th Infantry, 320th Infantry, 716th Infantry
1942	5 August	Hans Behlendorff	319th Infantry, 320th Infantry, 716th Infantry
1942	2 September	Hans Behlendorff	319th Infantry, 320th Infantry, 716th Infantry, 7th Air
1942	8 October	Hans Behlendorff	319th Infantry, 320th Infantry, 716th Infantry
1942	5 November	Hans Behlendorff	165th Infantry, 319th Infantry, 320th Infantry, 716th Infantry
1942	1 December	Hans Behlendorff	165th Reserve, 319th Infantry, 320th Infantry, 709th Infantry, 716th Infantry
1943	1 January	Hans Behlendorff	165th Reserve, 319th Infantry, 709th Infantry, 716th Infantry
1943	3 February	Hans Behlendorff	165th Reserve, 319th Infantry, 709th Infantry, 716th Infantry
1943	4 March	Hans Behlendorff	319th Infantry, 709th Infantry, 716th Infantry
1943	9 April	Gustav-Adolf von Zangen	319th Infantry, 709th Infantry, 716th Infantry
1943	1 May	Gustav-Adolf von Zangen	319th Infantry, 709th Infantry, 716th Infantry
1943	1 June	Gustav-Adolf von Zangen	319th Infantry, 709th Infantry, 716th Infantry
1943	7 July	Gustav-Adolf von Zangen	319th Infantry, 709th Infantry, 716th Infantry
1943	5 August	Erich Marcks	319th Infantry, 709th Infantry, 716th Infantry
1943	5 September	Erich Marcks	319th Infantry, 709th Infantry, 716th Infantry
1943	4 October	Erich Marcks	319th Infantry, 709th Infantry, 716th Infantry
1943	8 November	Erich Marcks	319th Infantry, 709th Infantry, 716th Infantry
1943	3 December	Erich Marcks	Minor forces
1944	1 January	Erich Marcks	319th Infantry, 352nd Infantry, 709th Infantry, 716th Infantry
1944	12 February	Erich Marcks	243rd Infantry, 319th Infantry, 352nd Infantry, 709th Infantry, 716th Infantry
1944	11 March	Erich Marcks	77th Infantry, 243rd Infantry, 319th Infantry, 352nd Infantry, 709th Infantry, 716th Infantry
1944	15 April	Erich Marcks	77th Infantry, 243rd Infantry, 319th Infantry, 352nd Infantry, 709th Infantry, 716th Infantry
1944	15 May	Erich Marcks	243rd Infantry, 319th Infantry, 352nd Infantry, 709th Infantry, 716th Infantry
1944	12 June	Wilhelm Fahrmbacher	319th Infantry II Parachute Corps: 3rd Parachute, 17th SS, 275th Infantry, 352nd Infantry
1944	17 July	Dietrich von Choltitz	2nd SS, 17th SS, 5th Parachute, Panzer Lehr, Schnelle Brigade 30, 77th Infantry, 91st Infantry, 243rd Infantry, 253rd Infantry, 265th Infantry, 275th Infantry, 319th Infantry
1944	31 August	Otto Elfeldt	84th Infantry, 243rd Infantry, 272nd Infantry, 326th Infantry

== Noteworthy individuals ==
- General der Kavallerie Rudolf Koch-Erpach, corps commander of LX Army Corps Z.b.H. (1. October 1940 - 1 March 1941)
- General der Infanterie Max von Viebahn, corps commander of LX Army Corps Z.b.H. (1 March - 1 December 1941)
- General der Artillerie Hans Behlendorff, corps commander of LX Army Corps Z.b.H. (1 December 1941 - 15 May 1942)
- Hans Behlendorff, corps commander of LXXXIV Army Corps (15 May 1942 – 1 April 1943).
- Gustav-Adolf von Zangen, corps commander of LXXXIV Army Corps (1 April 1943 – 1 August 1943).
- Erich Marcks, corps commander of LXXXIV Army Corps (1 August 1943 – 12 June 1944). Killed in action on 12 June 1944.
- Wilhelm Fahrmbacher, corps commander of LXXXIV Army Corps (12 June 1944 – 15 June 1944).
- Dietrich von Choltitz, corps commander of LXXXIV Army Corps (15 June 1944 – 30 July 1944).
- Otto Elfeldt, corps commander of LXXXIV Army Corps (30 July 1944 – 20 August 1944).
