= Worldwar: In the Balance =

1994 novel by Harry Turtledove

- First edition
- Author: Harry Turtledove
- Cover artist: Bob Eggleton
- Language: English
- Series: Worldwar
- Genre: Alternate history
- Published: January 3, 1994 (Del Rey Books)
- Publication place: United States
- Pages: 488 (hardcover edition)
- ISBN: 0-345-38241-2
- OCLC: 28256143
- Dewey Decimal: 813/.54 20
- LC Class: PS3570.U76 W67 1994
- Followed by: Worldwar: Tilting the Balance

Worldwar: In the Balance is a 1994 alternate history novel by American writer Harry Turtledove. It is the first novel of the Worldwar Tetralogy, as well as the first installment in the extended Worldwar series that includes the Colonization trilogy and the novel Homeward Bound. The plot begins in late 1941, while the Earth is torn apart by World War II. An alien fleet arrives to conquer the planet, forcing the warring nations to make uneasy alliances against the invaders. Meanwhile, the aliens, who refer to themselves as the Race, discover that their enemy is far fiercer and more technologically advanced than expected.

== Plot summary ==
After arriving in the Earth's solar system, the Conquest Fleet's essential personnel are awakened from cold sleep after a 20-year journey originating from Tau Ceti II. Fleetlord Atvar, busy making the final preparations for the invasion of Earth, expects a rapid victory over the primitive beings populating the planet. He is interrupted by a communications officer, who reports that radio emissions are emanating from Earth. Atvar refuses to believe the report since the most recent intelligence, gathered from a probe that visited Earth in the 12th century AD, indicates that the inhabitants are a pre-industrial species.

The Conquest Fleet reaches Earth orbit in December 1941 and begins surveying the planet. It is shocked to find that in the course of only 800 years, the inhabitants have moved from a primitive agricultural society to an industrial civilization. The Race's technology has hardly changed in more than 50,000 years, and other known intelligent species are similarly slow to evolve.

After six months of reconnaissance and intelligence gathering, Atvar consults in May 1942 with the Shiplords of the Conquest Fleet. The troops have been awakened from cold sleep and are prepared to commence with military operations. However, Atvar can, technically, cancel the invasion. Unwilling to call off the attack and face the Emperor back on Home, Atvar orders the assault to begin.

Soon, the Race detonates several atomic bombs above the Earth's atmosphere in an attempt to disrupt human communications, and the attack begins.

On the night of May 30, only hours after detonating the nuclear bombs, the Race's forces attack human aircraft and ground vehicles in and around designated landing zones. Once the sites are secured, troop ships begin landing and disgorging ground forces. The Race simultaneously establishes bases on every continent except Antarctica.

Latin America and Africa are overrun almost immediately, with Mexico the only one resisting the invaders but falling a week after fierce fighting. Landing bases in Florida, Illinois, Idaho, and New York State cause widespread panic and chaos in the United States. The Race's forces establish bases in occupied Poland, cutting Nazi Germany off from the bulk of its forces in the Soviet Union and resulting in a massive German retreat westward. The United Kingdom's air forces are battered from alien bases in Spain and France. The Soviet Union must deal with enemy strongholds in Ukraine, Outer Mongolia, and Siberia. Everywhere, humankind falls back in the face of a seemingly-unstoppable nemesis.

Hostilities between the Axis and Allied powers end almost immediately, simply because there is no other viable option. With the Race's forces battering the human armies into submission, no resources can be expended on human rivalries. The unsettling reality of the new balance of power is emphasized by the fact that in the early days of the fighting, only Germany is able to battle the aliens with any measure of success. That is only natural since Germany has been at war longer than the other major powers and has an economy specifically geared toward war. However, Americans are nauseated by the idea of fighting on the same side as Hitler, and the Soviets, having already been betrayed and attacked by the Germans, are at best reluctant to be working alongside them.

After the initial assault, the Race's troops come to a virtual standstill. It is not so much human resistance that keeps them from advancing as much as its tendency to deliberate their options before acting. Mankind takes advantage of the respite provided to wage localized counterattacks, nearly all of which are unsuccessful. In the process, it finds that the Race lacks tactical combat initiative and can be easily lured into traps, but their advanced tech makes exploiting these weaknesses almost impossible. The Race also discovers that its orbital atomic detonations had little or no effect on the human militaries. It had thought that the resulting electro-magnetic pulse would short out any advanced technology of humans, but it soon realizes that humans do not yet possess silicon computer chips. Most human electronics, such as radios, use vacuum tubes, which are less efficient but also more resistant to electro-magnetic interference.

Hitler takes advantage of the brief lull in the fighting in an artillery unit in Ukraine to attack an alien base using railroad guns. The German battery manages to destroy two of the Race's ships (the 67th Emperor Sohrheb and the 56th Emperor Jossano), including the one that carries the bulk of the Conquest Fleet's atomic stockpile. The resulting explosion sends chunks of plutonium flying across several acres. Soviet partisans take notice of the care with which the Race goes about collecting the strange metal.

Elsewhere in Ukraine, Major Heinrich Jäger manages to destroy one of the Race's landcruisers and a troop carrier, and another panzer unit and infantry destroy a second landcruiser but at the cost of his entire panzer company. Narrowly escaping from the battle, he is found by Lieutenant Ludmila Gorbunova, who flies him back to the airfield in which she is stationed. From there, Jäger is sent to Moscow where he spends several weeks as an ambiguous guest of the Soviet government, considered neither an official prisoner-of-war nor an ally. Finally, he is asked to take part in a joint German-Soviet operation in Ukraine that is aimed at recovering some of the plutonium.

The ad hoc band of Soviet partisans and displaced German soldiers that is charged with the assignment manages to hijack a shipment of plutonium. In accordance with negotiated arrangements, the load is divided into two, and they go their separate ways. Jäger is given a horse and is forced to ride across the Ukrainian steppe and enemy-occupied Poland to reach Germany with the precious metal. Somewhere between the towns of Chernobyl and Hrubieszów, Jäger is ambushed by Jewish partisans. Though they are nominally allies of the Race, the Jews recognize the threat that the aliens pose to mankind. They take half the plutonium in Jäger's possession and let him return to Germany with the other half. The Jewish partisans send their commandeered plutonium to England, where it is subsequently shipped to the United States.

Upon his arrival in Germany, Jäger is promoted to the rank of colonel and awarded the German Cross in Gold at a ceremony held in Berchtesgaden, Hitler's Bavarian resort. While Jäger enjoys a well-deserved furlough there, Vyacheslav Molotov arrives to consult with Hitler on the conduct of the war. The Soviet ambassador is flown to Bavaria by Lieutenant Gorbunova, to Jäger's surprise. Jäger and Gorbunova grow close during their short time together.

In an attempt to reduce human resistance, Atvar orders the use of atomic weapons on Washington, DC, and Berlin, hoping to persuade the Americans and the Germans to surrender. Berlin is hit first, primarily in retaliation for the destruction of the Race's ships in Ukraine. Atvar regrets the need to atomize human territory, mostly because Earth has much less land than sea, but he sees the display of power as necessary since Germany fields the strongest human army. The Race is less dismayed by the attack on Washington, DC, since it is an administrative and communications center, with few industrial and commercial resources. Furthermore, Atvar rationalizes that most of the radioactive fallout will drift harmlessly out into the Atlantic. Instead of breaking the human will to resist, the attacks inspire both nations to fight harder and to hasten production of their own atomic weapons.

Meanwhile, in the United States, Jens Larssen is forced to travel to White Sulphur Springs, West Virginia, where the US government has set up a temporary capital after the bombing of Washington, DC. Larssen warns the Army Chief of Staff, General George C. Marshall, that the US Army must defend Chicago at all costs since the metallurgical laboratory stationed at the University of Chicago is working feverishly to develop atomic power, which might be the only chance of humanity to defeat the Race. Marshall assures Larssen that holding Chicago is a key component of the army's strategy. Satisfied, Larssen makes his way back to the university.

On his way back, Larssen finds that the Race has captured most of Ohio and Indiana. He carefully makes his way through and around enemy lines. In the process, he spends several weeks in one of the Race's prison camps but manages to convince it that he is no threat to them. Found by US troops, Larssen explains that he is a physicist on important government business. After several interrogations, Larssen is granted an audience with General George S. Patton, who explains that a major military operation is currently being planned to keep the Race out of Chicago. Since he is so valuable to the war effort and because of the dangers involved, Patton refuses to allow Larssen to proceed to Chicago until the Americans have secured the city.

As the winter of 1942 begins, the Race's attacks begin to lose momentum. On their home planet, snow is extraordinarily rare outside the laboratory, and much of the land is sandy desert, leaving Race forces totally unprepared for the harsh winters often found on Earth. As soon as the first blizzard hits Illinois, a handful of American fighters and bombers, hoarded for the last desperate strike, move against the Race's positions in western Indiana and southern Wisconsin. Massive artillery barrages follow. Finally, American infantry and tank units, under Patton in the east and General Omar Bradley in the north, move toward their objective, Bloomington, Illinois. Although human M4 Shermans and P-51 Mustangs are no match for the Race's landcruisers and killercraft, the alien forces are so badly outnumbered and the weather so inhospitable that they are beaten into a retreat. Under Patton's tremendously energetic, aggressive leadership, US troops move rapidly and manage to encircle some of the Race's slower formations in a ring of armor and destroy them in detail. Mankind scores its first major victory against the nemesis from the stars.

Fleetlord Atvar and the Conquest Fleet's Shiplords begin to grow worried about the war's progress, having lost control of all of northern Illinois. When the invasion began, they were confident that their technological superiority would guarantee a rapid victory, even in the face of expansive human industrial power. While it has managed to subdue South America, Africa, and Australia, the Race still faces stiff resistance in North America, Europe, and Asia six months after the attack started, and faces the prospect of losing ground in all three theatres.

Having expected a quick and easy victory, the Conquest Fleet finds itself living a logistical nightmare as the humans continue to fight: the Race's more advanced weaponry, such as guided missiles, anti-armor rockets, landcruisers, killercraft, and helicopters, are being destroyed in ever greater numbers, and munitions are rapidly being spent. While simple weapons, such as rifles, bullets, artillery shells, and mortars, can be replicated in captured human factories, the advanced machines and more complex munitions cannot be replaced. Worse still, the Race has already seen humans are alarmingly adaptable and quick to learn, meaning that the longer the war lasts, the faster the technological gap between the two sides will shrink. Atvar is informed by his intelligence officers that human vehicles are dependent upon petroleum for fuel and that striking at refineries that process oil might reduce the combat effectiveness of humanity's armies. Atvar orders an airborne attack upon the Romanian oilfields at Ploiești, but the bombing raid meets with limited success and costs the Race valuable killercraft.

As 1942 nears its end, Patton and Bradley march their forces into Bloomington, and Jens Larssen arrives in Chicago to find the city in ruins. He makes his way through the rubble, encounters a civilian populace in severe disarray, and heads for the University of Chicago. There, Larssen is informed by a custodian that the metallurgical laboratory has evacuated the campus and is relocating to Denver. Like the war, Larssen's journey has a long way to go.

== See also ==
- The War of the Worlds
- Footfall

== Release details ==
- 1994, USA, Del Rey ISBN 0-345-38241-2, Pub date 3 January 1994, Hardback
- 1995, USA, Del Rey ISBN 0-345-38852-6, Pub date February 1995, Paperback

== Translations ==
- Italian: "Invasione: anno zero" ("Invasion: year zero"), 1995; Editrice Nord (Narrativa Nord #57)
- Russian: "Флот вторжения" ("Invasion Fleet"), 2003
