= Second contact =

Second contact may refer to:

- Second contact, an event that occurs during an astronomical transit
- "Second Contact", a 2020 episode of Star Trek: Lower Decks
- Fire Hawk: Thexder - The Second Contact, 1989 video game
- Colonization: Second Contact, 1999 Harry Turtledove novel
