= Colonization (disambiguation) =

Colonization is the process of establishing a colony.

Colonization or colonisation may also refer to:

- In the United States, until the Union won the Civil War, the policy of having African Americans voluntarily move to Africa or Latin America, supported by the American Colonization Society.
- Colonisation (biology), the process in biology by which a species spreads to new areas
- Space colonization, the human migration to other bodies in the Solar System
- Colonization (series), a trilogy of books by Harry Turtledove
- Sid Meier's Colonization, a computer game released by Microprose in 1994
- Civilization IV: Colonization, a 2008 remake of the 1994 game
