= 85th Infantry Division (Wehrmacht) =

German military unit during WW II

- 85. Infanterie-Division
- Active: February 1944 - March 1945
- Country: Nazi Germany
- Branch: Army
- Type: Infantry
- Size: Division
- Engagements: World War II: Battle of Normandy; Battle of the Bulge

Commanders
- Feb – Nov 1944: Kurt Chill
- Nov 1944 – Mar 1945: Helmut Bechler

The 85th Infantry Division (German: 85. Infantrie-division) was a Wehrmacht division used in the Second World War. It participated in the German defence in the Battle of Normandy, and took part in the German counter-offensive in the Ardennes.

== Operational history ==
The 85th Infantry Division was raised in February 1944 and placed under the command of Lieutenant General Kurt Chill, previously the commanding officer of the 122nd Infantry. Participating as an occupational division in German-occupied France, the 85th was part of the 15th Army's rear-guard in Northern France during the D-Day landings. It was moved to Normandy in early August as part of a relief force in the forming Falaise pocket, where it was to replace the 12th SS-Panzer Division "Hitlerjugend" by August 11. On August 14, the division received help from second company of the 102nd SS Heavy Panzer Battalion as it travelled from Assy to Maizieres; its commander was killed when the escort convoy encountered a group of Sherman tanks attached to the 1st Hussars. On August 15, the Canadian 4th Armoured Division broke through the 85th's defences around the Falaise pocket.

=== The Netherlands ===
Damaged, the division was ordered back to Germany to replenish its numbers. However, Chill ordered his men to form a number of reception stations at the bridgeheads of the Albert Canal in northern Belgium; his idea was to pick up stragglers as a means of gaining numbers, instead.

The month of its relocation to the Netherlands also coincided with Operation Market Garden, the allied invasion of the Netherlands.

Under attack by the 2nd Canadian Infantry Division in early October, "Kampfgruppe Chill", a detachment of the 85th, was assigned to the Scheldt to replace the retreating 346th Infantry Division. This was however, part of a deception by Lieutenant Colonel Friedrich von der Heydte to fool the Canadians into attacking a much more powerful force. In reality, the detachment consisted of the 185th Artillery Regiment and remnants of the 1053rd and 1054th Grenadier Regiments. The rest of the force consisted of three battalions of the 2nd Parachute Division. The Calgary Highlanders, unaware of the true size and skill of the division group, suffered bitterly at Hoogerheide due to this deception, which was worsened by the arrival of the 244th and 667th Army Assault Gun Brigades.

Chill was replaced as division commander by the highly decorated Major General Helmut Bechler in mid-November. Also in mid-November, the division had been separated between armies, with parts going to the 15th Army's 98th Army Corps and the 1st Parachute Army.

The division, along with the 15th Army's LXXIV Army Corps, participated in the Battle of Hürtgen Forest in December 1944 as the Wehrmacht attempted to force the Allies out of the Ardennes. The division under Bechler continued to hold out against Allied advances until its final capitulation in March 1945; the rest of the corps would be destroyed at the Ruhr pocket the following April in the Battle of Aachen.

Remnants of the division were merged with others to form Infantry Division Potsdam in late March 1945. Infantry Division Potsdam was indeed briefly known as "85th Infantry Division" between 29 March and 4 April 1945, before it received its final designation.

== See also ==
- List of German divisions in World War II
