= 47th Infantry Division (Wehrmacht) =

- German: 47. Infanterie-Division
- Active: 1 February 1944 – September 1944
- Country: Germany
- Branch: Heer (Wehrmacht)
- Type: Infantry
- Size: Division

The 47th Infantry Division (German: 47. Infanterie-Division) was an infantry division of the German Heer during World War II. It was formed in February 1944 and was destroyed by the forces of the Western Allies in the Mons cauldron in September 1944. The division was then reassembled as the 47th Volksgrenadier Division and operated until 1945.

== Operational history ==
The 47th Infantry Division was raised on 1 February 1944 near Calais in German-occupied France from the 156th Reserve Division. The process of reclassification of the 156th Reserve Division had started on 23 November 1943. Subsequently, the 47th Infantry Division was assigned to coastal defense duty against the possibility of a naval invasion by the Western Allies. When this invasion became reality as Operation Overlord, was launched starting with the D-day landings on 6 June 1944, the 47th Infantry Division under command of Otto Elfeldt, was assigned to 5th Panzer Army. The German units were unable to hold their grounds against the Allied forces, were pushed past Paris towards Mons in Belgium. There, the unit was trapped by Allied forces in a cauldron battle in September 1944 and destroyed.

In 1944, the 47th Infantry Division was redeployed as the 47th Volksgrenadier Division.
