= Dramatis personae =

Main characters in a dramatic work written in a list

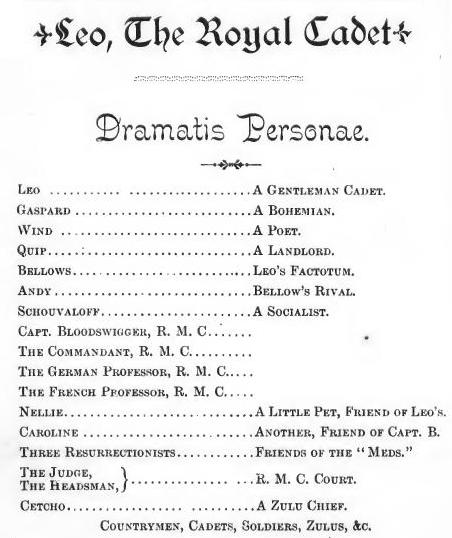
Dramatis personae for Leo, the Royal Cadet by Oscar Ferdinand Telgmann

Dramatis personae (Latin: 'persons of the drama') are the main characters in a dramatic work written in a list. Such lists are commonly employed in various forms of theatre, and also on screen. Typically, off-stage characters are not considered part of the dramatis personae. It is said to have been recorded in English since 1730, and is also evident in international use.

It is customary to give a cast list, which also has next to each character in a second column the name of the actor or actress playing the part; an alternative version lists the names of the actors who played the parts originally. In order not to give away vital parts of the plot some names may be altered, for example, mixed up with another name. Some minor characters may be listed just as the actors who perform the parts.

== Other uses ==
In a wider sense, the term can be applied to any situation in which people or characters play a role, or appear to do so—such as a metaphor, a drama, or a court case. It may also be facetiously applied in a situation where members of a group appear to play predictable roles, often for comic effect.

Literary critic Vladimir Propp in his book Morphology of the Folktale uses the term dramatis personae when referring to the character roles of fairy tales, from his analysis of the Russian tales of Alexander Afanasiev.

It is also sometimes used in anthropology to denote the roles people assume when performing a social ritual, as used by Clifford Geertz in his study of Balinese ritual.

== Literature ==
Outside the theatre medium, some novels also have a dramatis personae at the beginning or end. This is most common in books with very large casts of characters, as well as children's books and speculative fiction.

For example, the opening pages of Jon Krakauer's Into Thin Air contain a dramatis personae.

Other examples include Worldwar: In the Balance by Harry Turtledove, and The Horus Heresy by various authors. Tamsyn Muir's Gideon the Ninth begins with a dramatis personae, as do all the books in the Red Rising series by Pierce Brown.

== Sociology and cultural studies ==
The term is used to describe the multiple identifications one may adopt in an attempt to emphasize the expression of one's own individualism. An individuality is never obtained, as this process of establishing dramatis personae creates a postmodern persona which 'wears many hats', each different hat worn for a different group or surroundings. A logic of identity and individuality is replaced by a more 'superficial, tactile logic of identification where individuals become more mask-like personae with mutable selves.' This self can no longer be theorized or based solely on an individual's job or productive function. The term was used by Karl Marx throughout Das Kapital, where the capitalist and worker are introduced as dramatis personae in human hinders.

== See also ==
- Acting
