= Colonization: Down to Earth =

Novel by Harry Turtledove

- First edition
- Author: Harry Turtledove
- Cover artist: Tim O'Brien
- Language: English
- Series: Colonization
- Genre: Alternate history/Science fiction
- Publisher: Del Rey Books
- Publication date: February 1, 2000
- Publication place: United States
- Pages: 496
- ISBN: 0-345-43020-4
- OCLC: 42080306
- Dewey Decimal: 813/.54 21
- LC Class: PS3570.U76 C64 2000
- Preceded by: Colonization: Second Contact
- Followed by: Colonization: Aftershocks

Colonization: Down to Earth is an alternate history and science fiction novel by Harry Turtledove. It is the second novel of the Colonization series, as well as the sixth installment in the extended Worldwar series. British editions are entitled Colonisation: Down to Earth and are the second of the Colonisation series.

== Plot ==
After the nuclear attack on the colonist ships in Second Contact, the Race continues to try to find the nation responsible, along with the purpose of the Lewis and Clark, a large space station launched by the United States. At the same time, the range of animals brought by the Race's colonists begins to spread into human nations, causing ecological trouble and causing conflicts between them.

In Nazi Germany, Heinrich Himmler, the Führer, dies unexpectedly in late 1964 and is replaced by Ernst Kaltenbrunner. Kaltenbrunner, angered by the policy of accommodation Himmler carried out towards the Race, including his refusal to invade the Race-occupied buffer state of Poland, initiates a nuclear war between Germany and the Race in 1965.
