= Richard Baltzer =

- Born: 1 June 1886; Danzig, West Prussia, Kingdom of Prussia, German Empire
- Died: 10 May 1945 (aged 58); Prague, Protectorate of Bohemia and Moravia
- Spouse: ∞ 1909 Magdalene Sack
- Military career
- Allegiance: German Empire; Weimar Republic; Nazi Germany
- Branch: Imperial German Navy; Prussian Army; Imperial German Army; Police (Polizei); German Army
- Service years: 1904–1945
- Rank: Generalleutnant
- Commands: Infanterie-Regiment 25; Landwehr Commander Allenstein; 217th Infantry Division; 156th Reserve Division; 182nd Infantry Division
- Conflicts: World War I World War II
- Awards: Iron Cross; German Cross in Gold

Richard Robert Karl Baltzer (1 June 1886 – 10 May 1945) was a German officer, finally a Lieutenant General during World War II who commanded several divisions.

== Biography ==
On 6 April 1904, Baltzer became a naval cadet in the Imperial Navy before transferring to the Prussian Army and joining the Field Artillery Regiment "Prince August of Prussia" (1st Lithuanian) No. 1 on 31 March 1905. After WWI, he served with the preliminary Reichswehr and transferred to the police on 1 December 1919. On 16 March 1936, he rejoined the army as a colonel.

=== World War II ===
In the summer of 1939, during the mobilization for World War II, he was appointed commander of the 217th Infantry Division, which he led during the Invasion of Poland. On 1 October 1939, he was promoted to lieutenant general. After the Polish campaign, the division was initially used as an occupation force in Poland. In the summer of 1940, the division was transferred to France also as an occupation force.

At the beginning of summer 1941 he led his division in Operation Barbarossa in the attack on northern Russia. On 31 January 1942 he was awarded the German Cross in Gold. On 15 April 1942, he was relieved of command and transferred to the Führer reserve.
On 15 August 1942 he was appointed commander of the 156th Reserve Division, which guarded the French coast. In December 1943 he was transferred again to the Führer reserve. On 25 March 1944 he was appointed commander of the 182nd Reserve Division, which was renamed into 182nd Infantry Division on 1 March 1945. He fought with this division in France and later in Slovakia.

== Death ==
On 10 May 1945, after the surrender of the Wehrmacht, he was killed in Prague in circumstances that remain unknown.

== Family ==
Richard was the son of teacher Provincial School Councilor Dr. phil. Andreas Eduard Martin Baltzer (b. 7 September 1855 in Dresden; d. 6 November 1914 in Münster) and his wife Anna Johanna Pauline, née Apel (1862–1942). Richard had several siblings, two of his brothers were also officers:

- Robert (1892–1943), Lieutenant General of the Wehrmacht
- Georg (born 7 April 1898 in Marienwerder; d. 12 May 1945 in the Ruhr area), veteran of WWI, Freikorps volunteer, businessman and Lieutenant Colonel of the Wehrmacht

=== Marriage ===
On 5 October 1909 in Brandenburg an der Havel, 2nd Lieutenant Baltzer married his fiancée Magdalene Sack (b. 15 January 1890 in Posen), daughter of then Colonel (later General of the Artillery) and commander of the 6. Feldartillerie-Brigade Louis Ernst Wilhelm Sack (b. 6 August 1854 in Braunschweig; d. 1930 in Berlin) and his wife Klara Katharina, née Wahnschaffe (b. 20 May 1857 in Warsleben). They would have two children:

- Hans-Martin (born 20 June 1913 in Gumbinnen), drafted into military service in WWII, † 29 March 1943 as an Obergefreiter (Private First Class E-3/Senior Lance Corporal) of the Wehrmacht in Karbussel, Mga District, Leningrad Region during the Red Army Operation Polar Star
- Ursula (born 15 December 1914 in Berlin-Schöneberg; d. 1988 or 1990); ∞ Potsdam 26 March 1937 Erhard "Egge" Heeren (b. 17 September 1911 in Northeim), Lieutenant Colonel of the Wehrmacht, † 31 July 1944 near Troisgots, north-western France (invasion front)

== Promotions ==
=== Prussian Army ===
- 6 April 1904 Seekadett (Officer Candidate at Sea)
- 31 March 1905 Fahnenjunker (Officer Candidate)
- Fahnenjunker-Unteroffizier (Officer Candidate with Corporal/NCO/Junior Sergeant rank)
- 18 November 1905 Fähnrich (Officer Cadet)
- 18 June 1906 Leutnant (2nd Lieutenant) with Patent from 15 February 1905
- 17 February 1914 Oberleutnant (1st Lieutenant)
- 18 June 1915 Hauptmann (Captain)

=== Police ===
- 1 December 1919 Polizei-Hauptmann (Police Captain)
- 31 January 1920 Polizei-Major (Police Major)
- 1 April 1930 Polizei-Oberstleutnant (Police Lieutenant Colonel)
- 21 March 1933 Polizei-Oberst (Police Colonel)
  - 18 May 1936 received administrative Rank Seniority (RDA) as an army Colonel from 1 June 1934 (13)
- 15 August 1933 Polizei-General (Police General)
- 22 June 1934 Generalmajor der Landespolizei (Major General of the State Police)

=== Wehrmacht ===
- 16 March 1936 Generalmajor (Major General) without Patent and RDA (ernannt)
  - 30 September 1937 received Rank Seniority (RDA) from 1 October 1937 (9)
- 30 September 1939 Generalleutnant (Lieutenant General) with effect and RDA from 1 October 1939 (8)

== Awards and decorations ==
- Liakat Medal (Ottoman Empire) in Silver (TVM2) on 21 December 1908
- Iron Cross (1914), 2nd and 1st Class
  - 2nd Class on 11 September 1914
  - 1st Class on 25 May 1916
- Hanseatenkreuz of Hamburg (HH) on 25 August 1917
- Military Merit Cross (Austria-Hungary), 3rd Class with the War Decoration (ÖM3K)
- Wound Badge (1918) in Black on 10 June 1918
- Honour Cross of the World War 1914/1918 with Swords on 14 November 1934
- Wehrmacht Long Service Award, 4th to 1st Class on 2 October 1936
- Repetition Clasp 1939 to the Iron Cross 1914 (1939), 2nd and 1st Class
  - 2nd Class on 19 September 1939
  - 1st Class on 1 October 1939
- German Cross in Gold on 31 January 1942
- Winter Battle in the East 1941–42 Medal on 1 August 1942
- War Merit Cross (1939), 2nd Class with Swords on 1 September 1943
