= LXXXVII Army Corps =

German army unit during WW II

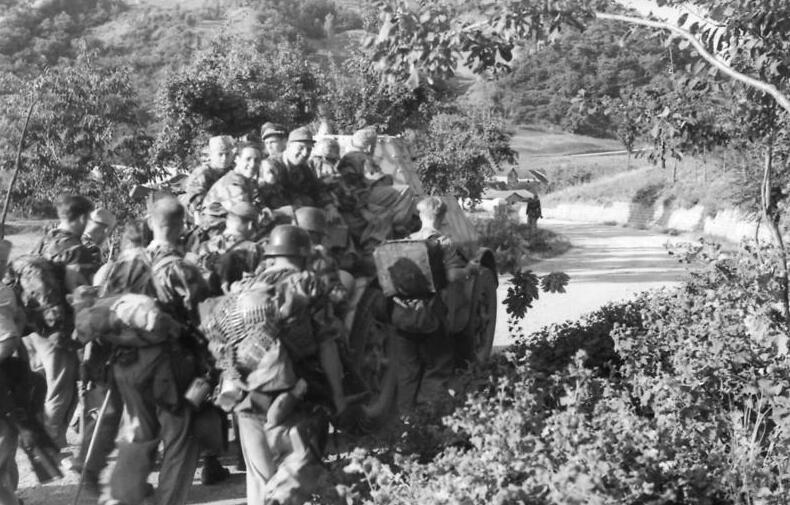
German soldiers on the march, Italy

The LXXXVII Army Corps (German: LXXXVII. Armeekorps) was an army corps of the German Wehrmacht during World War II. It was formed in 1942 and existed until March 1944.

Between March 1944 and August 1944, the successive formation was known as Army Detachment von Zangen (German: Armeeabteilung von Zangen), and then, between August 1944 and the end of the war, as Army Group Liguria (German: Armeegruppe Ligurien).

== History ==
=== LXXXVII Army Corps, November 1942 – March 1944 ===
The LXXXVII Army Corps was formed on 5 November 1942 from General Command G (German: Generalkommando G), also known as General Command North Brittany (German: Generalkommando Nord-Bretagne). The initial commander of the LXXXVII Army Corps was Erich Marcks.

Marcks was replaced as corps commander by Gustav-Adolf von Zangen on 1 August 1943.

=== Army Detachment von Zangen, March 1944 – August 1944 ===
In March 1944, the LXXXVII Army Corps became Armeeabteilung von Zangen, a field army level formation named after corps commander Gustav-Adolf von Zangen.

In August 1944, the army detachment was then formed to become Armeegruppe Ligurien.

== Structure ==
Organizational structure of the LXXXVII (87th) Army Corps
Name	Year	Date	Subordinate units	Army	Army Group	Operational area
LXXXVII Army Corps	1942	1 December	343rd Infantry, 346th Infantry, 90th Panzergrenadier Division	7th Army	Army Group D	Brittany
LXXXVII Army Corps	1943	1 January	343rd Infantry, 346th Infantry, 90th Panzergrenadier Division	7th Army	Army Group D	Brittany
LXXXVII Army Corps	1943	3 February	343rd Infantry, 346th Infantry, 90th Panzergrenadier Division	7th Army	Army Group D	Brittany
LXXXVII Army Corps	1943	4 March	343rd Infantry, 346th Infantry, 90th Panzergrenadier Division	7th Army	Army Group D	Brittany
LXXXVII Army Corps	1943	9 April	343rd Infantry, 346th Infantry, 90th Panzergrenadier Division	7th Army	Army Group D	Brittany
LXXXVII Army Corps	1943	1 May	343rd Infantry, 346th Infantry, 90th Panzergrenadier Division	7th Army	Army Group D	Brittany
LXXXVII Army Corps	1943	1 June	343rd Infantry, 346th Infantry, 90th Panzergrenadier Division	7th Army	Army Group D	Brittany
LXXXVII Army Corps	1943	7 July	343rd Infantry, 346th Infantry, 90th Panzergrenadier Division	7th Army	Army Group D	Brittany
LXXXVII Army Corps	1943	August	None	None	Oberbefehlshaber Süd	Liguria
LXXXVII Army Corps	1943	September	None	None	Army Group B	Liguria
LXXXVII Army Corps	1943	October	None	None	Army Group B	Liguria
LXXXVII Army Corps	1943	November	None	None	Army Group B	Liguria
LXXXVII Army Corps	1943	3 December	334th Infantry, 356th Infantry	14th Army	Army Group C	Liguria
LXXXVII Army Corps	1944	January	Unknown	14th Army	Army Group C	Liguria
LXXXVII Army Corps	1944	February	Unknown	14th Army	Army Group C	Liguria
Armeeabteilung von Zangen	1944	15 April	OZAK: 278th Infantry LXXV: 162nd Infantry, 356th Infantry, Fortress Brigade Almers Reserves: 188th Mountain	itself	Army Group C	Liguria
Armeeabteilung von Zangen	1944	17 May	OZAK: 278th Infantry LXXV: 162nd Infantry, 356th Infantry, Fortress Brigade 135 188th Mountain	itself	Army Group C	Liguria
Armeeabteilung von Zangen	1944	17 June	LXXV: 16th SS, 42nd Jäger, Fortress Brigade 135	itself	Army Group C	Liguria
Armeeabteilung von Zangen	1944	11 July	LXXV: 16th SS, 42nd Infantry, Fortress Brigade 135 Reserves: 34th Infantry	itself	Army Group C	Liguria

== Noteworthy individuals ==
- Erich Marcks, corps commander of the LXXXVII Army Corps (12 November 1942 – 1 August 1943).
- Gustav-Adolf von Zangen, corps commander of the LXXXVII Army Corps and Armeeabteilung von Zangen (1 August 1943 – August 1944).
