= Erich Marcks =

German World War II general (1891–1944)

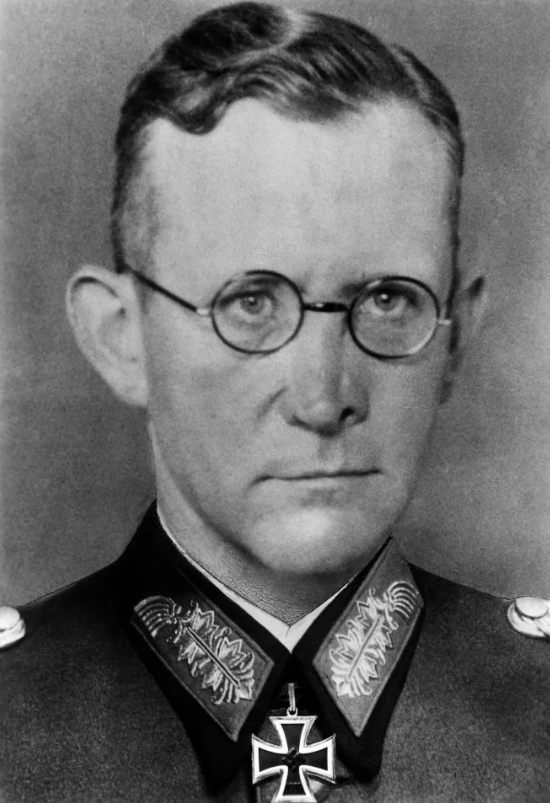
- Born: 6 June 1891; Schöneberg, Prussia, German Empire
- Died: 12 June 1944 (aged 53); Hébécrevon, Saint-Lô, France
- Relatives: Gerhard Marcks (cousin)
- Military career
- Allegiance: German Empire; Weimar Republic; Nazi Germany
- Branch: Imperial German Army; Reichswehr; German Army (Wehrmacht)
- Service years: 1910–1944
- Rank: General der Artillerie
- Unit: LXXXIV Army Corps
- Conflicts: World War I World War II
- Awards: Knight's Cross of the Iron Cross with Oak Leaves

Erich Marcks (6 June 1891 – 12 June 1944) was a German general in the Wehrmacht during World War II. He authored the first draft of the operational plan, Operation Draft East, for Operation Barbarossa, the invasion of the Soviet Union, advocating what was later known as A–A line as the goal for the Wehrmacht to achieve, within nine to seventeen weeks. Marcks studied philosophy in Freiburg in 1909.

== Career ==
Born in 1891, Erich Marcks joined the Army in 1910 and fought in World War I. He completed General Staff Training and was transferred to the Imperial General Staff Corps in 1917. Marcks was awarded the Iron Cross 2nd Class and then 1st Class, and posted to the German Supreme Command. After the war, Marcks fought with the paramilitary Freikorps. He joined the Army of the German Republic (Reichsheer); between 1921 and 1933, he held several staff and command positions, and then served in the Ministry of Defense. On 1 April 1933, after Hitler came to power, Marcks was transferred to the army, serving as Chief of Staff of VIII Corps. He was a recipient of the Knight's Cross of the Iron Cross with Oak Leaves.

== Operation Draft East ==
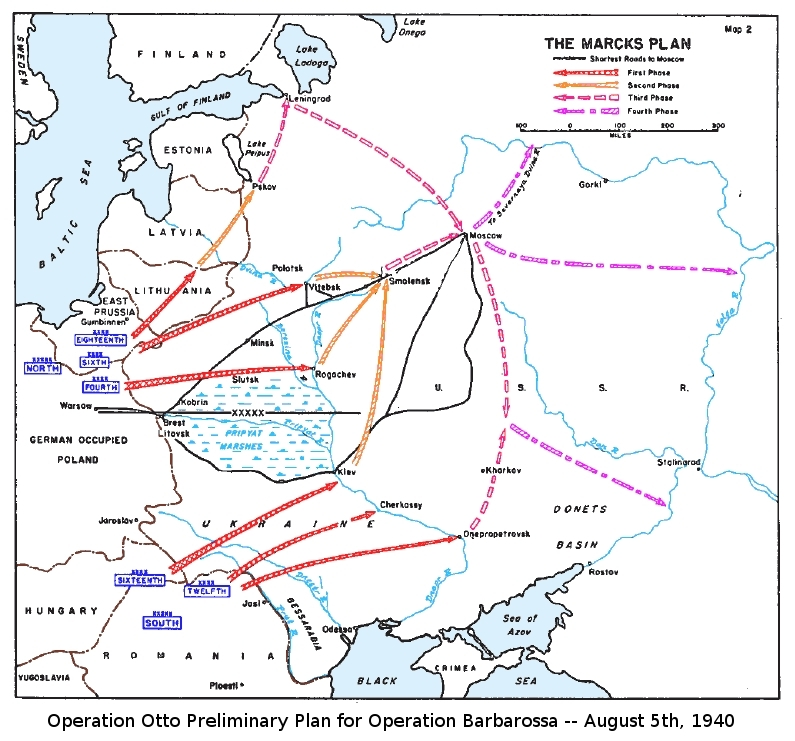
The Marcks Plan (published 5 August 1940) was the original German plan of attack for Operation Barbarossa, the invasion of Soviet Union during World War II, as depicted in a US Government study (March 1955)

As Chief of Staff VIII Corps, Marcks took part in the attack on Poland and was promoted to Chief of Staff 18th Army, serving with it during the Battle of France. In the summer of 1940, Franz Halder, chief of OKH General Staff, directed Marcks to draft an initial operational plan for the invasion of the Soviet Union. Marcks produced a report entitled "Operation Draft East". Citing the need to "protect Germany against enemy bombers", the report advocated the A–A line as the operational objective of the invasion of "Russia" (sic). This goal was a line from Arkhangelsk on the Arctic Sea through Gorky and Rostov to the port city of Astrakhan at the mouth of the Volga on the Caspian Sea. Marcks envisioned that the campaign, including the capture of Moscow and beyond, would require between nine and seventeen weeks to complete.

== Ukrainian SSR, Normandy and death ==
In December 1940, Marcks became commanding general of the 101st Light Infantry Division.

In June 1941 he was gravely wounded in Ukraine, necessitating the amputation of his left leg. After his recovery, he was named commanding general of the 337th Infantry Division from March 1942 until September 1942. Marcks was promoted to General der Artillerie and was named commanding general of the LXXXIV Corps, which he commanded during the Allied Normandy Invasion. Having had his 53rd birthday on D-Day (6 June 1944), he was wounded in an Allied air attack on 12 June 1944, while travelling to Carentan to oversee a counter-attack. His car was spotted by a Fighter-Bomber, he was hit in the groin by shrapnel and died the same day. Posthumously, he was awarded the Oak Leaves to the Knight's Cross of the Iron Cross (24 June 1944).

== In popular culture ==
In the film The Longest Day, Marcks is played by Richard Münch. In the TV Movie Rommel, he is played by Hans Kremer.

== Awards ==
- Iron Cross (1914) 2nd Class (25 September 1914) & 1st Class (August 1915)
- Hanseatic Cross of Hamburg
- Wound Badge (1918) in black
- Honour Cross of the World War 1914/1918
- Clasp to the Iron Cross (1939) 2nd Class (21 September 1939) & 1st Class (29 September 1939)
- Knight's Cross of the Iron Cross with Oak Leaves
  - Knight's Cross on 26 June 1941 as Generalleutnant and commander of the 101 Light Infantry Division
  - Oak Leaves on 24 June 1944 as general and commander of LXXXIV Army Corps
- Wound Badge (1939) in gold

Military offices
Preceded by Generalleutnant Kurt Pflieger	Commander of 337. Infanterie-Division; 15 March 1942 – 5 October 1942	Succeeded by Generalleutnant Otto Schünemann
Preceded by none	Commander of LXVI. Reservekorps; 21 September 1942 – 1 October 1942	Succeeded by General der Infanterie Baptist Knieß
Preceded by none	Commander of LXXXVII. Armeekorps; 5 November 1942 – 1 August 1943	Succeeded by General der Infanterie Gustav-Adolf von Zangen
Preceded by General der Infanterie Gustav-Adolf von Zangen	Commander of LXXXIV. Armeekorps; 1 August 1943 – 12 June 1944	Succeeded by General der Artillerie Wilhelm Fahrmbacher
