= Otto Elfeldt =

WW2 German army general (1895–1982)

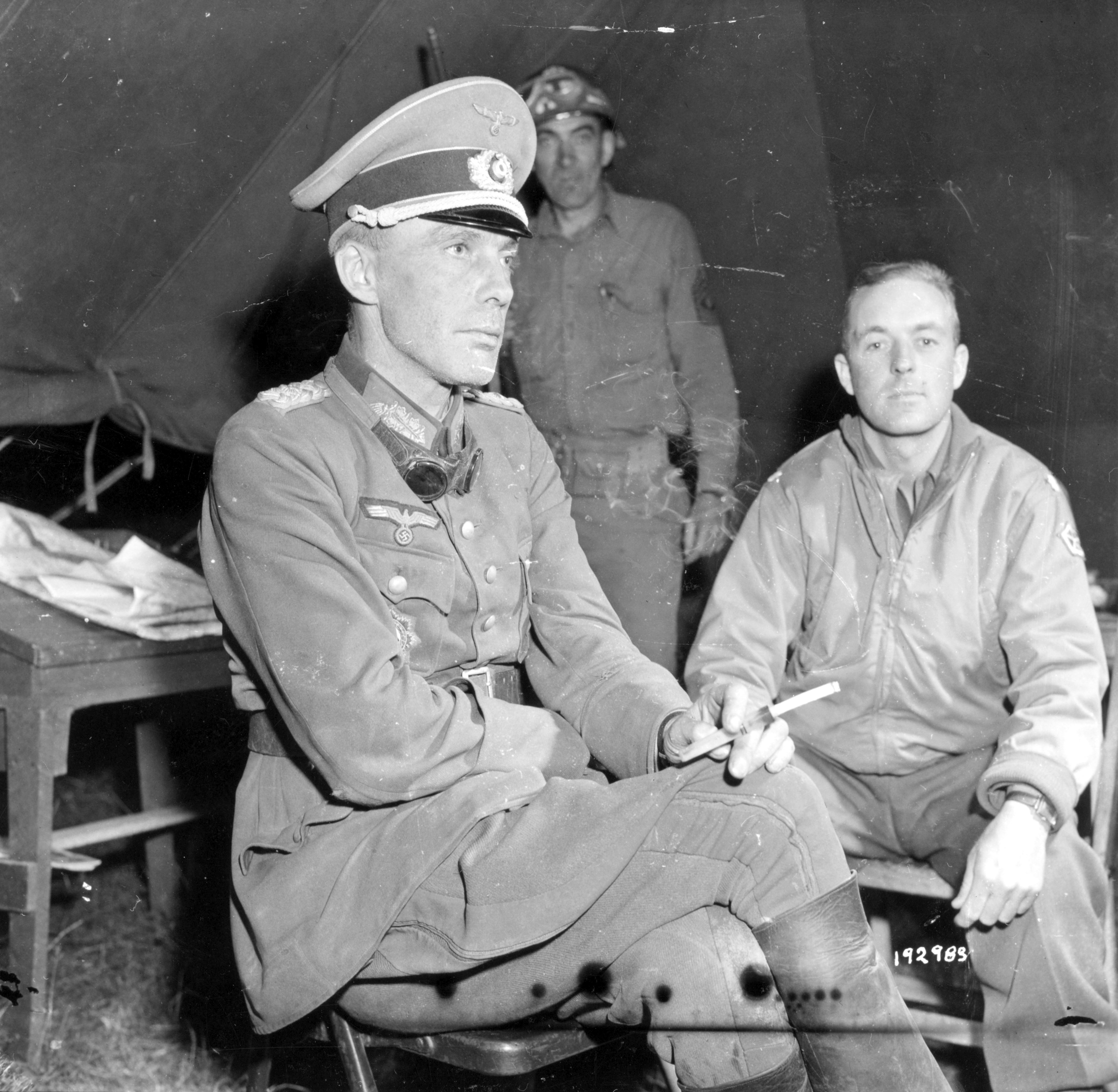
- Elfeldt as a POW, August 1944
- Born: 10 October 1895; Bad Sülze, Grand Duchy of Mecklenburg-Schwerin, German Empire
- Died: 23 October 1982 (aged 87); Bad Schwartau, Schleswig-Holstein, West Germany
- Military career
- Allegiance: German Empire; Weimar Republic; Nazi Germany
- Branch: Army (Wehrmacht)
- Service years: 1914–1944
- Rank: Generalleutnant
- Conflicts: World War I; World War II; Battle of France; Battle of Białystok–Minsk; Battle of Smolensk (1941); Battle of Moscow; Falaise pocket
- Awards: German Cross in Gold

Otto Elfeldt (10 October 1895 – 23 October 1982) was a German career military officer who took part in both world wars. He became a Generalleutnant during World War II and commanded division and corps level infantry units. After the D-Day invasion, he was taken as a prisoner of war, and was held at Trent Park and Island Farm until 1948. He was a recipient of the German Cross in Gold of Nazi Germany.

== Early career ==
Elfeldt was born at Bad Sülze in the Grand Duchy of Mecklenburg-Schwerin in 1895, and he joined the Imperial German Army at the start of World War I. By the end of the war, he was a Leutnant and the adjutant of the 20th Foot Artillery Regiment. He remained in the post-war Reichswehr and was a battalion commander in artillery regiments from October 1934 to May 1939, when he was posted as a staff officer in the Oberkommando des Heeres (OKH – army high command) during the summer of 1939.

== World War II ==
At the beginning of World War II, Elfeldt was the commander of Artillery Regiment Staff 619, and then an artillery officer on the general staff of Army Group A until September 1940. He next served until October 1942 on the staff of the general of artillery in the office of the commander-in-chief of the army. From November 1942 to November 1943, he was the commander of the 302nd Infantry Division, with which he fought on the eastern front at Voroshilovgrad, the Mius River and Zaporizhia. In December 1943, he became commander of the 165th Reserve Division in Belgium and, in February 1944, of the 47th Infantry Division in France. On 30 July 1944, he took over command of the LXXXIV Army Corps from Dietrich von Choltitz, but his corps was surrounded and destroyed in the Falaise Pocket.

Eltfeldt was taken prisoner by General Maczek's Polish 10th Armoured Cavalry Brigade near Saint-Lambert in Normandy in August 1944, and he was later held in Trent Park and Island Farm Special Camp until his release in January 1948.

== Awards and decorations ==
- Iron Cross (1914) 2nd and 1st class
- Hanseatic Cross of Hamburg
- Military Merit Cross of Mecklenburg-Schwerin 1st class
- Wound Badge (1914) in black
- Honour Cross of the World War 1914/1918
- German Cross in gold
- Clasp to the Iron Cross 2nd and 1st class

== Sources ==
- Traces of War
- Trent Park
- Webb, James Jack (2024). Generals and Admirals of the Third Reich: For Country or Fuehrer. Vol. 1: A–G. Havertown, PA: Casemate Publishers. ISBN 978-1-952-71512-9.

Military offices
Preceded by Generalleutnant Konrad Haase	Commander of 302. Infanterie-Division; 26 November 1942 – 12 November 1943	Succeeded by Generalleutnant Karl Rüdiger
Preceded by Generalmajor Johannes Nedtwig	Commander of 156. Reserve Division; 27 December 1943 - February 1944	Succeeded by: 47. Infanterie-Division
Preceded by: 156. Reserve Division	Commander of 47. Infanterie-Division; February 1944 - 30 July 1944	Succeeded by Generalmajor Carl Wahle
Preceded by General der Infanterie Dietrich von Choltitz	Commander of LXXXIV. Armeekorps; 30 July 1944 – 20 August 1944	Succeeded by none
