= Colonization: Aftershocks =

2001 novel by Harry Turtledove

- First edition
- Author: Harry Turtledove
- Cover artist: Viktor Koen
- Language: English
- Series: Worldwar and Colonization series
- Genre: Alternate history/Science fiction
- Publisher: Del Rey Books
- Publication date: January 30, 2001
- Publication place: United States
- Pages: 496
- ISBN: 0-345-43021-2
- OCLC: 45794623
- Dewey Decimal: 813/.54 21
- LC Class: PS3570.U76 C63 2001
- Preceded by: Colonization: Down to Earth
- Followed by: Homeward Bound

Colonization: Aftershocks is an alternate history and science fiction novel by Harry Turtledove. It is the third and final novel of the Colonization series and the seventh installment in the extended Worldwar series.

== Plot ==
In 1965, the nuclear war between Nazi Germany and the Race ends with a German surrender after Ernst Kaltenbrunner, the Führer, is killed. He is replaced by Walter Dornberger, who agrees to disband the Axis Forces, withdraw German troops from Occupied France, and disband the German rocket and nuclear forces. The German withdrawal results in instability in the governments of its allies, such as the British Union of Fascists, led by Oswald Mosley, in the United Kingdom; clashes between the Free French Forces and the new government of liberated France; and radioactive fallout drifting into the Soviet Union. However, Dornberger secretly begins stockpiling weapons and missile parts, allowing Germany the option to rearm itself in the future.

Meanwhile, the nuclear attack on the Race's colony fleet from Second Contact is finally revealed. It was an American attack, ordered by US President Earl Warren. When it is revealed, Fleetlord Atvar gives Warren a choice: dismantle the American space program, or allow the Race to nuke Indianapolis, Indiana, for revenge. To the surprise of all, Warren allows the Race to destroy Indianapolis and then kills himself, with US Vice President Harold Stassen taking over. It is eventually stated that the reason Warren allowed the city to be destroyed over the space program was that the Americans were working on a starship that would allow them to journey to the Race's homeworld and to repay their visit to Earth.

Meanwhile, the Race itself undergoes large social unrest, due to the effects of ginger on their females. Drug addiction, the black market, prostitution, and the practice of marriage all arise from it, along with a reproductive system that is unregulated, much like that of humans.
