= Hans Behlendorff =

German general (1889–1961)

- Born: 13 August 1889; Allenstein, German Empire
- Died: 16 March 1961 (aged 71); Baden-Baden, West Germany
- Military career
- Allegiance: German Empire; Weimar Republic; Nazi Germany
- Branch: Imperial German Army; Reichswehr; Army (Wehrmacht)
- Service years: 1908–1944
- Rank: General of the Artillery
- Conflicts: World War I World War II
- Awards: Knight's Cross of the Iron Cross

Hans Behlendorff (13 August 1889 – 16 March 1961) was a German general during World War II. He was also a recipient of the Knight's Cross of the Iron Cross of Nazi Germany.

Behlendorff was born at Allenstein (today, Olsztyn, Poland) in 1889 and entered the Royal Prussian Army in 1908. He served in World War I and, at the end of the war, he was an Hauptmann and the adjutant to General Command 51. He remained in the post-war Reichswehr as a career officer. He was a department head in the Ministry of the Reichswehr from 1934 to 1938, then led an artillery unit until July 1939. During World War II, Behlendorff served as the commander of the 34th Infantry Division between July 1939 and December 1941. He next commanded the LXXXIV Army Corps from May 1942 until April 1943, and then was placed into the Führerreserve until his retirement in December 1944.

== Awards and decorations ==
- Iron Cross (1914)
  - 2nd Class (16 September 1914)
  - 1st Class (6 April 1915)
- Knight's Cross of the House Order of Hohenzollern with swords
- Knight's Cross 1st class with swords of the Friedrich Order
- Hanseatic Cross of Hamburg
- Military Merit Cross of Mecklenburg-Schwerin, 2nd class
- Schaumburg-Lippe Cross for Loyal Service
- Military Merit Cross of Austria-Hungary, 3rd class with war decoration
- Honour Cross of the World War 1914/1918
- Clasp to the Iron Cross (1939)
  - 2nd Class (13 December 1939)
  - 1st Class (10 May 1940)
- Wound Badge in black
- Knight's Cross of the Iron Cross on 11 October 1941 as Generalleutnant and commander of 34. Infanterie-Division

Military offices
Preceded by Generalleutnant Friedrich Bremer	Commander of 34. Infanterie-Division; 19 July 1939 – 11 May 1940	Succeeded by Generalleutnant Werner Sanne
Preceded by Generalleutnant Werner Sanne	Commander of 34. Infanterie-Division; 1 November 1940 – 5 December 1941	Succeeded by Generalleutnant Friedrich Fürst
Preceded by none	Commander of LXXXIV. Armeekorps; May 1942 – 1 April 1943	Succeeded by General der Artillerie Gustav-Adolf von Zangen
