= 217th Infantry Division (Wehrmacht) =

- 217. Infanterie-Division
- Active: August 1939 – July 1944
- Country: Nazi Germany
- Branch: Army (Wehrmacht)
- Type: Infantry
- Size: Division
- Engagements: Oranienbaum Bridgehead; Siege of Leningrad

Commanders
- Notable commanders: Richard Baltzer; Friedrich Bayer (general); Otto Lasch; Walter Poppe

The 217th Infantry Division (German: 217. Infanterie-Division) was an infantry division of the German Heer during World War II. It later became the Division Group 217. It is also listed as the 217th Volksgrenadier Division.

== Operational history ==
The 217th Infantry Division, part of the third Aufstellungswelle, was initially formed on 17 August 1939 as a training division in Wehrkreis I (East Prussia) in Allenstein. The division was upgraded to a full division on the day of German mobilization, 26 August 1939. It initially consisted of the Infantry Regiments 311, 346 and 389, as well as Artillery Regiment 217.

At the beginning of the Invasion of Poland that started on 1 September 1939, the 217th Infantry Division served in the reserve of Georg von Küchler's 3rd Army under Fedor von Bock's Army Group North. It did not see heavy combat in the Poland campaign. After the conclusion of the campaign, the division was transferred to XXXV Army Corps on the border to the Soviet-occupied part of Poland.

During the Battle of France 1940, the 217th Infantry Division was part of the OKH reserve, but again did not see significant action. In June 1940, the division was transferred to the I Army Corps under 4th Army. In July, the 217th was moved to the XXVI Army Corps under 18th Army, where it remained until April 1941. After a brief stay at II Army Corps in May 1941, it was transferred to XXVI Corps, where it would remain until early August.

The division was transferred eastwards to its home in East Prussia in July 1940. After that, it participated in the German invasion of the Soviet Union as part of XXVI Corps under Army Group North. It was mainly involved in coastal defense duties in the Baltic. At that time, under 18th Army, at times under XXVI Corps or under XXXXII Army Corps. Subsequently, it took part in the siege of the Red Army's Oranienbaum Bridgehead from October 1941 to April 1942. After that, it joined the Siege of Leningrad in May 1942 and fought there until February 1943. From March 1943 onwards, it held a sector near Volkhov until July 1943. In fall 1943, the 217th Division suffered severe casualties in the Kiev area.

It was downgraded to become Division Group 217 of Corps Detachment C on 2 November 1943. The Division Group 217 was destroyed at Brody in July 1944.

== Noteworthy Individuals ==
- Richard Baltzer, divisional commander starting 26 August 1939.
- Friedrich Bayer, divisional commander starting 15 April 1942.
- Otto Lasch, divisional commander starting 27 September 1942.
- Walter Poppe, divisional commander starting October 1943.
- Lothar Freutel, commander of Artillery Regiment 217 from March 1941 to January 1943, later in service with the 156th Reserve Division and 290th Infantry Division.
