= 182nd Infantry Division (Wehrmacht) =

- 182. Infanterie-Division
- Active: October 1939 – 1945
- Country: Nazi Germany
- Branch: Army
- Type: Infantry
- Size: Division
- Engagements: World War II

The 182nd Infantry Division (German: 182. Infanterie-Division) was an infantry division of the German Heer during World War II. The unit, at times designated Commander of Reserve Troops XII/II (German: Kommandeur der Ersatztruppen XII/II), 182nd Division (German: 182. Division), Division No. 182 (German: Division Nr. 182), 182nd Replacement Division (German: 182. Ersatz-Division), Division Nancy (German: Division Nanzig), Division Gümbel, Division Karl, and 182nd Reserve Division (German: 182. Reserve-Division), was active between 1939 and 1945.

The division was destroyed in the Caen area in early August 1944, then deployed in Slovakia in November of the same year.

== History ==
A second command staff for Wehrkreis XII (Wiesbaden), designated Kommandeur der Ersatztruppen XII/II, was formed on 20 October 1939. This staff was redesignated 182. Division on 7 November 1939, then located in Litzmannstadt, and renamed again to become Division Nr. 182 on 23 December 1939. The division's initial commander was Friedrich Bayer, appointed on 19 October 1939.

=== Division Nr. 182 ===
The division consisted of the following elements in March 1940:

- Infantry Replacement Regiment 79 (Battalions: 208, 212, 226), Litzmannstadt.
- Infantry Replacement Regiment 246 (Battalions: 313, 352, 404), Pleschen.
- Infantry Replacement Regiment 263 (Battalions: 463, 483, 485), Sieradz.
- Artillery Replacement Regiment 34 (Detachments: 179, 246, 263), Ostrowo.
- Pioneer Replacement Battalion 34, Leslau.

On 24 April 1940, Bayer was replaced as divisional commander by Hans von Basse. On 10 August 1940, the division was deployed back to Koblenz in Wehrkreis XII. The divisional structure remained largely the same, with only one additional unit in the form of Marchine Gun Replacement Battalion 14 at Bitburg. Regiment 79 was moved to Koblenz, Regiment 246 to Trier, and Regiment 263 to Idar-Oberstein. The Artillery Replacement Regiment 34 and the Pioneer Replacement Battalion 34 were moved to Koblenz.

On 30 May 1941, Basse was replaced as divisional commander by Franz Karl. On 15 July 1941, the division was moved from the Koblenz area to the vicinity Nancy in occupied France. Division No. 182 consisted of the following elements at that point:

- Infantry Replacement Regiment 79 (Battalions: 208, 212, 226), Nancy.
- Infantry Replacement Regiment 246 (Battalions: 313, 352, 404), Luxembourg City.
- Infantry Replacement Regiment 263 (Battalions: 463, 483, 485), Commercy.
- Infantry Replacement Regiment 342 (Battalions: 321, 697, 698), Verdun.
- Artillery Replacement Regiment 34 (Detachments: 15, 179, 246, 263), Nancy.

On 5 June 1942, Karl was replaced as divisional commander by Karl Gümbel. On 13 June 1942, the division was joined by Infantry Replacement Regiment 112 (Battalions: 110, 256, 437, 438), which had been redeployed from Darmstadt to Chalons. In exchange, the division passed Regiment 246 in Luxembourg City to Division No. 172.

=== 182nd Replacement Division (Division Karl, Division Gümbel) ===
On 10 July 1942, the alert units of the 182nd Division were called up and moved towards Draveil starting on 13 July. The resulting force was still officially designated Division Nr. 182, but concurrently also carried the titles 182. Ersatz-Division, and was further nicknamed Division Gümbel or Division Karl after the divisional commander at that time. Franz Karl returned to once again replace Karl Gümbel as divisional commander on 3 August 1942. In August 1942, the 182nd Division was put under the supervision of the XXV Army Corps, which was in turn under the 7th Army.

=== 182nd Reserve Division (Division Nancy) ===
Those parts of the division that had remained in the Nancy sector instead of deploying to Draveil were once again put under a staff titled Division No. 182 on 11 July 1942. That staff was renamed Division Nanzig on 1 September 1942 and again redesignated Division No. 462 on 15 October 1942. Paul Lettow took divisional command from Karl on 27 September 1942. Division No. 462 was split on 26 November 1942 as part of the reorganization of the Replacement Army, and the replacement units stayed with the 462nd, whereas the training units came to the 182nd Reserve Division.

In December 1942, the 182nd Division was put under the LXXXII Army Corps of the 15th Army. It remained there until February 1943, before moving to the reserves of Army Group D until January 1944. On 5 December 1942, Otto Schilling replaced Lettow as divisional commander.

In December 1943, the 182nd Reserve Division consisted of the following elements:

- Reserve Grenadier Regiment 79 (Battalions: 208, 212, 226), Chalons-Sur-Marne.
- Reserve Grenadier Regiment 112 (Battalions: (Note: Battalion 256, previously part of Regiment 112, was disbanded before December 1943.) 110, 437, 438), Senlis.
- Reserve Grenadier Regiment 263 (Battalions: 463, 483, 485), Gisors.
- Reserve Grenadier Regiment 342 (Battalions: 321, 697, 698), Mantes-Gassicourt.
- Reserve Artillery Regiment 34 (Detachments: 70, 105, 179), Meaux.
- Reserve Machine Gun Battalion 14, Langres.
- Reserve Division Supply Commander 1082, Gisors.

On 20 January 1944, Reserve Grenadier Regiment 263 was disbanded and its three battalions were used for formations of various new units. Battalion 463 joined the 988th Regiment under the 276th Infantry Division, whereas Battalions 483 and 485 joined Regiments 981 and 982 respectively, both of which were part of the 272nd Infantry Division. Furthermore, Battalions 226 and 697 were taken out of Regiments 79 and 342 to be used for the formation of Division Wahn following an order of 28 January 1944.

On 23 January 1944, the 182nd Reserve Division was moved to the Pas-de-Calais area, with new headquarters set up at Helfaut. The division was taken out of the army group reserves and given to the reserves of the 15th Army instead. On 25 March 1944, Richard Baltzer took command of the division, a post he would hold until the end of the war.

The 182nd Reserve Division consisted of the following elements on 1 March 1944:

- Reserve Grenadier Regiment 79 (Battalions: 208, 212), Bailleul.
- Reserve Grenadier Regiment 112 (Battalions: 110, 437, 438), Pihen-lès-Guînes.
- Reserve Grenadier Regiment 342 (Battalions: 321, 698), Wizernes.
- Cossack Battalion 570, Saint-Venant.
- Reserve Artillery Regiment 34 (Detachments: 70, 105, 179), Chateau d'Alenthun.
- Reserve Machine Gun Battalion 14, Cassel.
- Reserve Division Supply Commander 1082, Arques.

Following an order from 30 July 1944 (in response to Operation Overlord), the 182nd Reserve Division was mobilized into the field army and subsequently destroyed by Allied forces in the Caen area. A reorganization into a Shadow Division of the 24th Aufstellungswelle that was ordered by Oberbefehlshaber West did not come to pass. Another planned reorganization into a 182nd Field Training Division, ordered by OKH on 20 August 1944, also failed to materialize.

A full redeployment of the 182nd Division was scheduled to be conducted in Wehrkreis X (Hamburg) starting in October 1944, but the division was called to Slovakia ahead of the deployment's completion on 20 November 1944. Here, the division was to complete deployment in the Nitra area in Wehrkreis XVII (Vienna), using recruits from Wehrkreis XII (Wiesbaden). The division's structure in late 1944 was as follows:

- 182nd Division HQ, Nitra.
- Reserve Grenadier Regiment 79 (Battalions: 208, 212), Topoľčany
- Reserve Grenadier Regiment 112 (Battalions: 110, 438), Banská Štiavnica.
- Reserve Grenadier Regiment 342 (Battalions: 321, 698), Pritwitz.
- Reserve Artillery Detachment 1082 (three batteries), Nitrianske Pravno.
- Reserve Pioneer Company 1082, Heiligenkreuz.
- Commander Division Supply Troops 1082, Nitra.

=== 182nd Infantry Division ===
On 1 April 1945, just over a month before German surrender, the 182nd Reserve Division became the 182nd Infantry Division. The Reserve Grenadier Regiments 79, 112, and 342 became the Grenadier Regiments 663, 664, and 665, respectively. Each of these regiments retained the strength of two battalions each. The Reserve Artillery Regiment 1082, at only one battalion, became the Artillery Regiment 1082.

The division was in Slovakia when the war ended, under the command of LXXII Army Corps of the 8th Army under Army Group South. Baltzer was still divisional commander.

== Noteworthy individuals ==
- Friedrich Bayer, divisional commander starting 19 October 1939.
- Hans von Basse, divisional commander starting 24 April 1940.
- Franz Karl, divisional commander starting 30 May 1941 and again starting 3 August 1942.
- Karl Gümbel, divisional commander starting 5 June 1942.
- Paul Lettow, divisional commander starting 27 September 1942.
- Otto Schilling, divisional commander starting 5 December 1942.
- Richard Baltzer, final divisional commander starting 25 March 1944.
