= Helmut Bechler =

German general

- Born: 2 June 1898; Grün, Amtshauptmannschaft Auerbach, Kingdom of Saxony, German Empire
- Died: 9 January 1971 (aged 72); Kassel, Hesse, West Germany
- Relatives: ∞ 1925 Ilse Herrmann (1901–1984); 5 children
- Military career
- Allegiance: German Empire; Weimar Republic; Nazi Germany
- Branch: Imperial German Army; Freikorps; Reichsheer; German Army
- Service years: 1915–1920; 1934–1945
- Rank: Generalmajor
- Unit: 16. Königlich Sächsisches Infanterie-Regiment Nr. 182 (1915–1918)
- Commands: 173rd Infantry Regiment; 504th Grenadier Regiment; 85th Infantry Division
- Conflicts: World War I World War II: Invasion of Poland; Battle of France; Operation Barbarossa; Battle of Białystok–Minsk; Battle of Smolensk (1941); Battle of Moscow; Battles of Rzhev; Battle of Kiev (1943); Kamenets-Podolsky pocket; Lvov–Sandomierz Offensive; Battle of Hürtgen Forest
- Awards: Knight's Cross of the Iron Cross
- Other work: Merchant (1921–1934)

Helmut Bernhard Franz Bechler (2 June 1898 – 9 January 1971) was a German general in the Wehrmacht during World War II who commanded the 85. Infanterie-Division. He was a recipient of the Knight's Cross of the Iron Cross of Nazi Germany.

== Promotions ==
- 10 June 1915: Fahnenjunker (Officer Candidate)
- 30 September 1915: Fahnenjunker-Unteroffizier (Officer Candidate with Corporal/NCO/Junior Sergeant rank)
- 3 December 1915: Fähnrich (Officer Cadet)
- 21 October 1916: Leutnant (2nd Liutenant)
- 31.12.1920: Charakter als Oberleutnant (Honorary 1st Lieutenant)
- 15 July 1934: Hauptmann with Rank Seniority (RDA) from 1 February 1934 (63)
- 31 March 1939: Major with RDA from 1 April 1939 (38)
- 18 January 1942: Oberstleutnant (Lieutenant Colonel) with RDA from 1 February 1942 (183)
- 15 February 1943: Oberst (Colonel) with RDA from 1 December 1942 (60
- 16 February 1945 (telex date): Generalmajor (Major General) with effect and RDA from 30 January 1945

== Awards and decorations ==
- Iron Cross (1914), 2nd and 1st Class
  - 2nd Class on 20 July 1916
  - 1st Class on 21 August 1918
- Saxon Albert Order, Knight 2nd Class with Swords (SA3bX/AR2X) on 23 May 1917
- Wound Badge (1918) in Black on 30 September 1918
- Baltic Cross
- Silesian Eagle Order, II. and I. Grade
  - II. Grade on 29 November 1919
  - I. Grade on 30 January 1920
- Honour Cross of the World War 1914/1918 on 5 March 1935
- Wehrmacht Long Service Award, 4th Class on 2 October 1936
- West Wall Medal
- Repetition Clasp 1939 to the Iron Cross 1914, 2nd and 1st Class
  - 2nd Class on 8 June 1940
  - 1st Class on 16 June 1940
- Winter Battle in the East 1941–42 Medal on 9 August 1942
- Referenced by name in the Wehrmachtbericht on 2 April 1944
- Wound Badge (1939) in Silver and Gold
  - Silver on 18 April 1944
  - Gold in February 1945
- Infantry Assault Badge in Silver on 3 July 1944
- German Cross in Gold on 20 December 1941 as Major and Commander of the I. Battalion/Infanterie-Regiment 173/87. Infanterie-Division
- Knight's Cross of the Iron Cross on 26 March 1944 as Oberst and Commander of the Grenadier-Regiment 504/291. Infanterie-Division

== Sources ==
- German Federal Archives: BArch PERS 6/1077 and PERS 6/299378

Military offices
Preceded by Generalleutnant Kurt Chill	Commander of 85. Infanterie-Division; 22 November 1944 - 15 March 1945	Succeeded by None
