= 156th Infantry Division (Wehrmacht) =

- 156. Infanterie-Division
- Active: April – May 1945
- Country: Nazi Germany
- Branch: Army
- Type: Infantry
- Size: Division

The 156th Infantry Division (German: 156. Infanteriedivision) was a German Army infantry division in World War II.

== History ==
The 156th Infantry Division was raised in April 1945, where it was sent to the eastern front, which was approaching westwards to the German border.

It was alternatively known as Division Nr. 156 (December 1939 - October 1942), Division Baltzer (November - December 1942) and 156. Reserve-Division (October 1942 - February 1944).

== Noteworthy individuals ==
=== Commanders ===
- LtGen Max Noack (1 September 1939 - 15 August 1942)
- LtGen Richard Baltzer (15 August 1942 - 8 July 1943)
- MajGen Johannes Nedtwig (8 July 1943 - September 1943)
- LtGen Richard Baltzer (September 1943 - 27 December 1943)
- LtGen Otto Elfeldt (27 December 1943 - February 1944)
- LtGen Siegfried Rekowski (April 1945 - 8 May 1945)

=== Operations officers ===
- Maj Herbert Giesenhagen (25 March 1945 – 2 May 1945)

== Bibliography ==
=== Sources ===
- Tessin, Georg (1973). "Die Landstreitkräfte 131—200". Verbände und Truppen der deutschen Wehrmacht und Waffen SS im Zweiten Weltkrieg 1939—1945 (in German). Vol. 7. Frankfurt/Main: E.S. Mittler. p. 98.

=== Further reading ===
- Theis, Kerstin (2016). "Das Fallbeispiel: die Gerichte der Div. Nr. 156 und Nr. 526". Wehrmachtjustiz an der "Heimatfront" (in German). De Gruyter Oldenbourg. pp. 49–58. ISBN 9783110405583.
