= Gustav-Adolf von Zangen =

German general

Gustav von Zangen
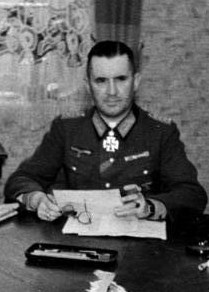
- Born: 7 November 1892; Darmstadt, Grand Duchy of Hesse, German Empire
- Died: 1 May 1964 (aged 71); Hanau, West Germany
- Relatives: ∞ 1917 Maria Schoel; 2 sons (both † in WWII)
- Military career
- Allegiance: Kingdom of Prussia; German Empire; Weimar Republic; Nazi Germany
- Branch: Prussian Army; Imperial German Army; Reichsheer; Police; German Army
- Service years: 1911–1945
- Rank: General der Infanterie
- Commands: 15th Army; 17th Infantry Division
- Conflicts: World War I; World War II; Phoney War; Western Campaign; Operation Barbarossa; Operation Market Garden; Battle of the Scheldt; Battle of the Bulge; Operation Blackcock; Ruhr Pocket (surrendered)
- Awards: Knight's Cross of the Iron Cross with Oak Leaves

Gustav Adolf Karl Friedrich Ernst von Zangen (7 November 1892 – 1 May 1964) was a German general in the Wehrmacht during World War II and a commander of the 15th Army in the Netherlands in 1944 during World War II. He was a recipient of the Knight's Cross of the Iron Cross with Oak Leaves of Nazi Germany.

== Life ==
Born in 1892, von Zangen joined the Prussian Army on 24 February 1911 and served with the Infantry Life (Household ) Regiment “Grand Duchess” (3rd Grand Ducal Hessian) No. 117 in Mainz. On 18 August 1912, he was transferred to the 9th Rhenish Infantry Regiment No. 160 and was commissioned on the same day. During World War I, he served as company officer, battalion adjutant, regimental adjutant, company leader, briagde adjutant, divisional orderly officer and divisional general staff officer.

From 1920 to 1935, he served with the police and then returned to the military. During World War II, he commanded the 17th Infantry Division on the Eastern Front, a Corps in France in 1943 and an Army detachment in Italy before being appointed to command the 15th Army on the Western Front. Having occupied the Pas de Calais during the 1944 campaign in France, Von Zangen was forced to evacuate his army, together with other divisions, across the Scheldt to the island of Walcheren and South Beveland.

There, they were attacked during the Battle of the Scheldt 2 October-8 November 1944. He deployed his force against the Allied advance into the Netherlands. On 24 October 1944 his headquarters in Dordrecht were bombed by the RAF. During the Ardennes offensive starting 16 December 1944, his 15th Army was tasked with fixing the British and U.S. forces north of the Bulge (see also Operation Blackcock, Operation Grenade.) Von Zangen surrendered in April 1945 in the Ruhr Pocket.

== Awards and decorations ==
- Iron Cross (1914) 2nd and 1st Class
  - 2nd Class on 13 September 1914
  - 1st Class on 19 March 1915
- General Honor Decoration (Hesse) "For Bravery" on the war ribbon (HAE1/HT)
- Hessian Warrior Badge of Honor in Iron (HK)
- Wound Badge (1918) in Black
- Honour Cross of the World War 1914/1918 with Swords
- Wehrmacht Long Service Award, 4th to 1st Class
- West Wall Medal
- Clasp to the Iron Cross, 2nd and 1st Class)
  - 2nd Class on 9 November 1939
  - 1st Class on 12 May 1940
- Eastern Front Medal
- Knight's Cross of the Iron Cross with Oak Leaves
  - Knight's Cross on 15 January 1942 as Oberst and commander of Infanterie-Regiment 88.
  - 647th Oak Leaves on 5 November 1944 as General der Infanterie and acting commander of the 15. Armee

== Sources ==
- German Federal Archives: BArch PERS 6/404 and PERS 6/301429

Military offices
Preceded by Generalleutnant Ernst Güntzel	Commander of 17. Infanterie-Division; 25 December 1941 – 1 April 1943	Succeeded by Generalmajor Richard Zimmer
Preceded by General der Artillerie Hans Behlendorff	Commander of LXXXIV. Armeekorps; 1 April 1943 – 1 August 1943	Succeeded by General der Artillerie Erich Marcks
Preceded by General der Artillerie Erich Marcks	Commander of LXXXVII. Armeekorps; 1 August 1943 – 8 July 1944	Succeeded by General der Artillerie Kurt Jahn
Preceded by General Hans von Salmuth	Commander of 15. Armee; 25 August 1944 – 18 April 1945	Succeeded by none
