= Kurt Chill =

German general (1895–1976)

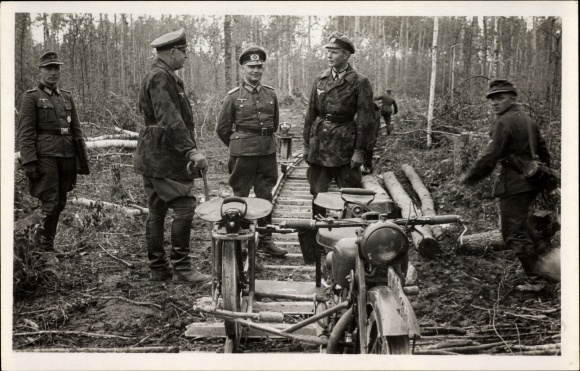
- Generalmajor Kurt Chill is third from the left, Demyansk Pocket, 1942
- Born: 1 May 1895; Toruń
- Died: 5 July 1976 (aged 81); Grömitz
- Military career
- Allegiance: German Empire; Weimar Republic; Nazi Germany
- Branch: German Army
- Service years: 1913–1920; 1935–1945
- Rank: Generalleutnant
- Commands: 122nd Infantry Division; 85th Infantry Division; LV Army Corps
- Conflicts: World War I; World War II; Invasion of Poland; Operation Barbarossa; Siege of Leningrad; Demyansk Pocket; Operation Overlord; Operation Market Garden; Battle of Aachen; East Prussian Offensive; Zemland Offensive
- Awards: Knight's Cross of the Iron Cross

Kurt Chill (1 May 1895 – 5 July 1976), born in Toruń, was a German general during World War II who commanded the LV Army Corps. He was a recipient of the Knight's Cross of the Iron Cross of Nazi Germany.

== Awards and decorations ==
- Knight's Cross of the Iron Cross on 25 October 1943 as Generalleutnant and commander of 122. Infanterie-Division

Military offices
Preceded by Generalleutnant Siegfried Macholz	Commander of 122. Infanterie-Division; 1 August 1942 – 10 October 1942	Succeeded by Generalleutnant Gustav Hundt
Preceded by Generalleutnant Alfred Thielmann	Commander of 122. Infanterie-Division; 27 June 1943 – 1 February 1944	Succeeded by Generalmajor Johann-Albrecht von Blücher
Preceded by None	Commander of 85. Infanterie-Division; 1 February 1944 – 22 November 1944	Succeeded by Generalmajor Helmut Bechler
Preceded by General der Infanterie Friedrich Herrlein	Commander of LV. Armeekorps; 5 February 1945 – 8 May 1945	Succeeded by None
