= Colonization: Second Contact =

1999 alternate history novel by Harry Turtledove

- First edition
- Author: Harry Turtledove
- Cover artist: Tim O'Brien
- Language: English
- Series: Colonization
- Genre: Alternate history/Science fiction
- Publisher: Del Rey Books
- Publication date: February 9, 1999
- Publication place: United States
- Pages: 496
- ISBN: 0-345-43019-0
- OCLC: 39728086
- Dewey Decimal: 813/.54 21
- LC Class: PS3570.U76 C65 1999
- Preceded by: Worldwar: Striking the Balance
- Followed by: Colonization: Down to Earth

Colonization: Second Contact is an alternate history novel by American writer Harry Turtledove. It is the first novel of the Colonization series and the fifth installment in the Worldwar series.

== Plot ==
The novel is set in 1963, twenty-one years following the end of the alternate World War II and nineteen years after the Race Invasion of Tosev 3. Earl Warren is President of the United States, Vyacheslav Molotov is the Premier of the Soviet Union, and Heinrich Himmler leads Nazi Germany. Smaller countries remain independent, such as the Republic of Ireland and Imperial Japan, which still controls portions of its World War II-era empire. A few isolated areas such as French Polynesia are still held by Charles de Gaulle's Free France, and in German-occupied France the French Resistance remains active. The Northern Hemisphere remains relatively free of Race occupation, but the hotter regions of the planet, such as Central and South America, Mexico, Spain, Portugal, Africa, China, the Middle East, and Australia, are all under Race control. The Race also occupies Poland, with the territory acting as a buffer state, keeping Germany and the Soviet Union from having a mutual land border and an easy way to restart the war between them.

At the start of the novel, the colonization fleet of the Race enters the Solar System, bringing with them 80-100 million colonists for settling on Earth. As the fleet enters Earth orbit, a human satellite unleashes a nuclear attack that kills millions. As Germany, the Soviet Union, and the United States each have large-scale space capability, any of the three nations may have been responsible for the attack. All three deny it when furious Race leaders, headed by Fleetlord Atvar, the commander of all Race forces sent to Earth, demand answers, but two of the three human nations are really as much unaware of the attacker's identity as the Race. In addition, while there is an uneasy peace between the independent human nations and the Race, Mao Zedong and Ruhollah Khomeini continue to lead popular resistance to the invaders in China and the Middle East, respectively. Race efforts to wage a counterinsurgency war in those regions are frustrated by their lack of familiarity with such warfare and a nearly-total lack of support from the human population. The Race also becomes aware of subtle support of the resistance movements by Germany, the United States, and the Soviet Union, but as the Race is unable to prove it, nothing can be done to stop them.

Meanwhile, the Race's colonists, who expected to encounter an Earth that was already conquered with the natives still at medieval levels of advancement, must deal with the consequences of the cold war with the humans. The fleet brings with it not only the first civilians but also the first Race females, both of which cause tension among the male soldiers who formed the invasion force. To the Race males, ginger is a euphoric drug; to the females, it causes them to go into estrus, throwing Race forces on Earth into social chaos. Worse still for Fleetlord Atvar is a sharp upswing in armed revolts in the Middle East and in China; at the novel's end, Khomeini's guerrillas have staged several successful ambushes against Race patrols, and resistance forces under Mao storm the Forbidden City.
