= Friedrich Bayer (general) =

German soldier (1887–1953)

- Born: 1 November 1887; Krotoschin, Prussia, German Empire
- Died: 5 August 1953 (aged 65); Voikovo prison camp, Soviet Union
- Military career
- Allegiance: German Empire; Nazi Germany
- Branch: Imperial German Army; German Army
- Service years: 1907−1919; 1935−1945
- Rank: Generalleutnant
- Commands: Division No. 182; 122nd Infantry Division; 181st Infantry Division; 217th Infantry Division; 347th Infantry Division; 408th Replacement Division; 153rd Field Training Division
- Conflicts: World War I World War II
- Other work: police officer

Friedrich Bayer (1 November 1887 – 5 August 1953) was a German lieutenant general during World War II who commanded several divisions.

== Biography ==
First, he commanded Division No. 182 (October 1939 - April 1940). This was followed by the position of Commander of Strasbourg until the beginning of 1941.

From mid-March 1941 he took over the newly established 281st Security Division, which he led until October 1941. Wilhelm von Leeb put him in charge of the extermination of all partisans north of Pskov in August 1941.

He was then transferred to the Führerreserve in October 1941. From December 1941 he took over the leadership of the 122nd Infantry Division for two months, and was commander of the 181st Infantry Division for a few days in March 1942. He was then commander of the 217th Infantry Division until the end of September 1942. On 27 September 1942, he became commander of the 347th Infantry Division, which he led until 12 October 1943. After that, he commanded the 408th Replacement Division.

From mid-June 1944, he took over command of the 153rd Field Training Division, which was destroyed during the Second Jassy–Kishinev offensive. Bayer attempted to enter Bulgaria while fleeing Romania, but was taken prisoner by Bulgarian forces. Later he was extradited into Soviet captivity, where he died in 1953.
