= Adolf Trowitz =

German general during World War II

Adolf Eduard Trowitz
- Born: 24 September 1893
- Died: 3 January 1978 (aged 84)
- Military career
- Allegiance: German Empire; Weimar Republic; Nazi Germany
- Branch: Army
- Rank: Generalmajor
- Commands: 122. Infanterie-Division; 332. Infanterie-Division; 57. Infanterie-Division
- Conflicts: World War I World War II: Bobruysk Offensive (surrendered)
- Awards: Knight's Cross of the Iron Cross

Adolf Eduard Trowitz (24 September 1893 – 3 January 1978) was a German general (Generalmajor) in the Wehrmacht during World War II who commanded several divisions. He was a recipient of the Knight's Cross of the Iron Cross, awarded by Nazi Germany for successful military leadership.

Trowitz surrendered to the Red Army in the course of the Soviet July 1944 Bobruysk Offensive (part of Operation Bagration). Convicted as a war criminal in the Soviet Union, he was held until 1955.

== Awards and decorations ==
- German Cross in Gold (8 June 1942)
- Knight's Cross of the Iron Cross on 21 February 1944 as Generalmajor and commander of 57. Infanterie-Division

Military offices
Preceded by Generalmajor Adolf Westhoff	Commander of 122. Infanterie-Division; 8 January 1943 – 15 May 1943	Succeeded by Generalleutnant Alfred Thielmann
Preceded by Generalleutnant Hans Schäfer	Commander of 332. Infanterie-Division; 5 June 1943 – August 1943	Succeeded by None
Preceded by Generalleutnant Vincenz Müller	Commander of 57. Infanterie-Division; 19 September 1943 – July 1944	Succeeded by None
