= 122nd Infantry Division (Wehrmacht) =

- 122. Infanterie-Division
- Division insignia, 1942-45
- Active: 5 October 1940 – 8 May 1945
- Country: Nazi Germany
- Branch: Army
- Type: Infantry
- Size: Division
- Nickname: Greif (Griffin) Division
- Engagements: World War II: Eastern Front (1941-1943); Operation Barbarossa; Siege of Leningrad; Demyansk Pocket; Continuation War; Battle of Tali-Ihantala; Battle of Vyborg Bay (1944); Eastern Front (1944-1945); Battle of Narva (1944); Courland Pocket

Commanders
- Notable commanders: Siegfried Macholz

The 122nd Infantry Division (German: 122. Infanterie-Division) was a German infantry division in World War II. It was formed on 5 October 1940 as part of the 11th wave (Aufstellungswelle).

It was formed from elements of the 32nd Infantry Division, 258th Infantry Division and non-motorized elements of the 14th Motorized Infantry Division.

== Organisation ==
1941	July 1944
Infantry Regiment 409; Infantry Regiment 410; Infantry Regiment 411	Grenadier Regiment 409; Grenadier Regiment 410; Grenadier Regiment 411
Reconnaissance Battalion 122	Fusilier Battalion 122
Artillery Regiment 122
Engineer Battalion 122
Field Replacement Battalion 122
Anti Tank Battalion 122	Anti Tank Battalion 122 (mot.)
Divisional Signal Battalion 122	Divisional Signal Battalion 122 (part motorised)
Divisional Services 122	Divisional Supply Troops 122; Administrative troops 122; Transport Park Troops 122; Fieldpost 122; Veterinary Troops 122; Medical troops 122

Initial division insignia, 1940-42

== Commanding officers ==
- Generalleutnant Sigfrid Macholz (5 October 1940 – 8 December 1941)
- Generalleutnant Friedrich Bayer (8 December 1941 – 17 February 1942)
- Generalleutnant Sigfrid Macholz (17 February 1942 – 1 August 1942)
- Generalleutnant Kurt Chill (1 August 1942 – 10 October 1942)
- Generalleutnant Gustav Hundt (10 October 1942 – ? November 1942)
- Generalleutnant Sigfrid Macholz (? November 1942 – 1 December 1942)
- Generalmajor Adolf Westhoff (1 December 1942 – 8 January 1943)
- Generalmajor Adolf Trowitz (8 January 1943 – 15 May 1943)
- Generalleutnant Alfred Thielmann (15 May 1943 – 27 June 1943)
- Generalleutnant Kurt Chill (27 June 1943 – 1 February 1944)
- Generalmajor Johann-Albrecht von Blücher (1 February 1944 – 4 February 1944)
- Generalmajor Hero Breusing (4 February 1944 – 25 August 1944)
- General der Infanterie Friedrich Fangohr (25 August 1944 – 20 January 1945)
- Generalmajor Bruno Schatz (20 January 1945 – 8 May 1945)
