= Homeward Bound (Turtledove novel) =

2004 novel by Harry Turtledove

- First edition cover
- Author: Harry Turtledove
- Cover artist: Jim Burns
- Language: English
- Series: Worldwar
- Genre: Science fiction novel, alternate history novel
- Publisher: Del Rey Books
- Publication date: December 28, 2004
- Publication place: United States
- Media type: Print (Hardback & Paperback)
- Pages: 608 pp (first edition, hardback)
- ISBN: 0-345-45846-X (first edition, hardback)
- OCLC: 56591994
- Dewey Decimal: 813/.54 22
- LC Class: PS3570.U76 H66 2005
- Preceded by: Colonization: Aftershocks

Homeward Bound (2004) is a science fiction and alternate history novel by Harry Turtledove. It is the eighth and final work in his Worldwar series fictional universe. It follows the events of the Colonization trilogy and gives some closure to the storylines.

Homeward Bound begins in 1972 and then flashes forward to 1977, 1982, 1984, 1994, 2012, and finally 2031, when the American starship Admiral Peary arrives at Tau Ceti and Home, the homeworld of The Race.

== Title ==
Homeward Bound has multiple meanings in the book. The Race's home planet is called Home, and many characters are headed there. For characters that are members of the Race, such as Ttomalss, Atvar, and Straha, they are headed home after the failed conquest of Earth. For Kassquit, it is her cultural home although not her biological one. The Earth ship Admiral Peary is headed to the planet Home, where they will confront the Race and try to demand respect as an independent planet or at least for the United States.

At the end of the novel, while most of the ship's crew has been in cryogenic sleep and suffered time dilation, they are given the chance to go back to Earth (their home). As the characters arrive, they handle their return as best they can.

== Plot summary ==
The Admiral Peary travels at between 0.35 and 0.4 c and takes a little over 30 years, instead of 24 (the Race's starship velocities are 0.5 c), to cross the twelve light-years between Earth and Tau Ceti. The ship is named Admiral Peary for its role as a military exploration ship, after Admiral Robert Peary, who did the same in an Arctic exploration.

When the Admiral Peary arrives in orbit around Home, the Race's planet in the Tau Ceti system, it causes a crisis in the highest levels of the Race. The Race's Emperor Risson and Fleetlord Atvar, sent back to Home with the dubious distinction of being the only Fleetlord not to conquer a planet, argue the merits and drawbacks of attempting to destroy mankind by massive nuclear strikes. Meanwhile, Researcher Ttomalss investigates reports of a major breakthrough by human scientists back on Earth.

The Race inadvertently cause itself a possible ecological disaster similar to what it caused on Earth with the Race's introduced species into the Earth's ecosystems by letting the humans' caged rats loose on Home. The rats were used for food testing for the humans.

It comes as a great shock to the Race when a second human starship, the Commodore Perry, arrives in orbit around Home, having traveled the twelve light-years in just five weeks. The faster-than-light drive, which appears to be based on the principle of folding space, allows the crew to return to Earth, which is familiar but still different from how they left it. Another pun is the ship's captain, Nicole Nichols, inspired by Star Trek's Lieutenant Uhura but playing off the actress's real name. The ship is named Commodore Perry for its role in opening up the Race's empire to access the US, after Commodore Matthew C. Perry, who did the same with Japan, and the Race fears that other human nations will make their way to Home, especially a recovered Germany.

== Characters ==
- Sam Yeager - United States Ambassador to the Race and foremost human expert on The Race.
- Jonathan Yeager - Expert on The Race, member of ambassadorial team, son of Sam Yeager, married to Karen Yeager.
- Karen Yeager - Expert on The Race, married to Jonathan Yeager.
- Glen Johnson - Scooter pilot and third highest-ranking ship pilot of the Admiral Peary.
- Atvar - Fleetlord of the Race who was in charge of Conquest Fleet that originally invaded Earth (Tosev 3).
- Ttomalss - Senior Researcher and psychologist of the Race. Foremost expert on the psychology of humans. "Father" of Kassquit.
- Kassquit - Researcher for The Race, human raised in the manner of The Race, only Tosevite citizen of the Empire.
- 37th Emperor Risson - The current Emperor of the Empire. (Risson is not the 37th Emperor [there have been thousands] but the 37th Emperor to bear the name "Risson.")
- The Doctor - An off-screen character whose death causes Sam Yeager to assume the duties of US Ambassador to the Race. (Note: The character is generally referred to in the novel as "The Doctor" but is Henry Kissinger.)

== Major themes ==
Diplomacy is a major theme of the novel. The humans spend their time trying to convince the Race that they are not dangerous barbarians. However, that mindset of the previously-technologically-superior Race will not be dissuaded. The Americans negotiate from a position of weakness, but both sides know that it is only a matter of time until that position becomes one of greater strength.

War, a terribly destructive war in which "millions, and probably billions" would die on Earth, Home and possibly also on the Empire's two other worlds, is an ever-present possibility, but none of the negotiators on either side is especially warlike, and they are on quite good terms personally. The Admiral Peary orbits Home, loaded with nuclear missiles that could be launched to rain death and destruction on a world that had not known war for 100,000 years. Even The Race's imperial capital, with the Emperor in his palace, a shrine at the centre of The Race's religion as well a centre of government, might be obliterated, as the Emperor explicitly remarks in one scene. Actually using the missiles is clearly not the Americans' preferred option but is never ruled out.

On the other hand, representatives of The Race are increasingly driven to the reluctant conclusion that they must launch a war of annihilation against the humans even though they have only a very doubtful chance of winning since waiting would reduce their chance of winning to zero. However, such considerations are rendered moot by the arrival of the FTL Commodore Perry, showing the Race that time has already run out for a pre-emptive war against the "Tosevites".

The younger, newly-arrived Americans behave with a manifest arrogance of power not only towards The Race but even towards their own "obsolete" older countrymen and women of the Admiral Peary. However, representatives of The Race, while embarking on a desperate struggle to catch up and achieve FTL flight for themselves, are able to devise a counterdeterrence even with their existing sub-light ships. They come up with the idea of launching them to hit Earth at half-light speed, causing horrendous damage dwarfing that of nuclear weapons and possibly destroying Earth altogether or rendering it uninhabitable. The threat of so retaliating for a nuclear strike at Home effectively establishes an interstellar version of mutual assured destruction.

Still, the situation remains fragile and precarious at the end, with not only The Race throwing their resources into the effort to achieve FTL flight but also the other human powers on Earth engaged on a similar effort. Members of The Race are especially worried about Germany, which had managed to recover from the terrible blows its war with The Race during the 1960s and, still ruled by the Nazis, would like to get revenge for that destruction. Major powers also include the Soviet Union, which still exists in the mid-21st century and did not undergo perestroika or glasnost, and Imperial Japan, which still retains its pre-1945 nationalist and militarist ideology and never underwent a democratising US occupation.

As against such dire threats, there is the hope that FTL would open up so many new planets for colonization as to give full satisfaction to everybody's expansionist inclinations, with no need of destructive wars. This hope is voiced by Human as well as "Lizard" characters. However, the book ends on a deliberately ambiguous note, with both optimistic and pessimistic scenarios fully feasible in the characters' immediate future.

== Release details ==
- 2004, USA, Del Rey Books ISBN 0-345-45846-X, Pub date December 28, 2004, hardback (First edition)
- 2005, UK, Hodder & Stoughton ISBN 0-340-73482-5, Pub date April 11, 2005, hardback
- 2005, USA, Del Rey Books ISBN 0-345-45847-8, Pub date December 27, 2005, paperback
- 2005, UK, Hodder & Stoughton ISBN 0-340-73483-3, Pub date October 24, 2005, paperback
