= Colonization (series) =

Book series by Harry Turtledove

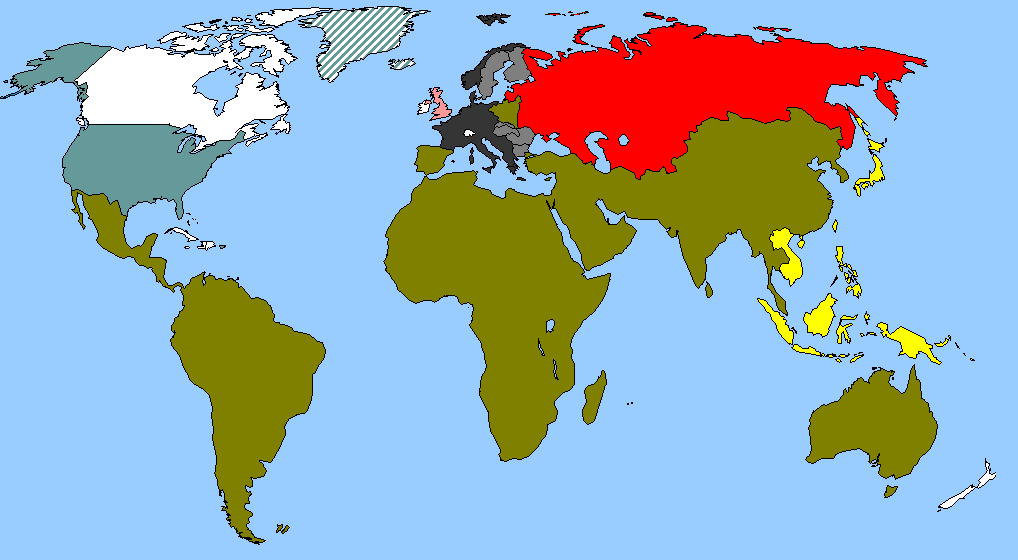
Map of the world when the Colonization series begins

Colonization is a trilogy of alternate history books by American writer Harry Turtledove. It is a series continuation of the situation set up in the Worldwar tetralogy, projecting the situation between humanity and The Race (the bipedal lizard-like invaders and settlers from Worldwar) nearly twenty years afterward, in the mid-1960s.

The Race has settled and plans to colonize nearly half the surface of the Earth, including Africa, Australia, China, southern Asia, Mexico, Central America, South America, Spain, Portugal, and Poland (prewar Poland and East Prussia). The United States, Canada, the Soviet Union, the Greater German Reich (Germany and the territories that it occupied during World War II), the United Kingdom, and Japan are the only other powers when the Race's colonization fleet of 80–100 million settlers arrives. Humanity and The Race still jockey for advantages over each other.

== Novels ==
Books of the Colonization trilogy are:

- Colonization: Second Contact (1999)
- Colonization: Down to Earth (2000)
- Colonization: Aftershocks (2001)

A follow-up novel to this series, Homeward Bound, was released in 2004.

== Political situation ==
The Race has taken over half of the planet. With the exception of the Greater German Reich, the Soviet Union, the Japanese Empire, the British Isles, the US, and some nations that are allied to the major powers, mostly in the Northern Hemisphere, the Race rules most of the Earth. The Race spends its time trying to adapt to conditions on Earth (for example, the aliens release species from Home on Earth, causing environmental trouble). The Soviet Union supplies weapons to Mao Zedong's Communist Party. The Greater German Reich attacks Race-held Poland and fails, resulting in the death of Führer Ernst Kaltenbrunner, his top officials, the nuclear destruction of much of Greater Germany, the removal of Nazi space installations, the German capital being relocated to Flensburg, and Walter Dornberger becoming the new Führer. France regains its independence under a new Fourth Republic. The United States is led by President Earl Warren. The Soviet Union is ruled by ex-Foreign Commissar Vyacheslav Molotov.

== Technology ==
The Race's initial invasion has benefited the technology of humanity. With the end to the second round of fighting, alien technology is being rapidly absorbed by humanity. Although the Race remains superior in technology, it is swiftly losing ground as human technology advances.

By the end of Colonization: Aftershocks, the United States and the Greater German Reich already have spacecraft floating among the asteroid belt. The Americans have also launched two human starships. The Soviet Union, the United States, and the Greater German Reich have established a Moon base, and Germany then the US put a man on Mars.

== Literary criticism and reception ==
A writer from the Irish Independent called the Colonization series one of the best of Turtledove's works.
