= List of fiction set in ancient Greece =

There is a body of ancient and modern fiction set in ancient Greece and ancient Greek culture, including Magna Graecia and Hellenistic kingdoms. Titles include:

== Books ==
=== Bronze Age and mythistoricals ===
==== Atlantis ====
- Poul Anderson, The Dancer from Atlantis (1971)

==== Crete ====
===== Daedalus =====
- Michael Ayrton
  - The Testament of Daedalus (1962)
  - The Maze Maker (1967)
- Erick Berry, Winged Girl of Knossos (1933)
- Ernst Schnabel, Story for Icarus (1958)

===== Theseus, Ariadne, Circe, Phaedra =====
- Eleanor Farjeon, Ariadne and the Bull (1945)
- André Gide, Theseus (1946)
- Roger Lancelyn Green, Mystery at Mycenae (1957)
- Madeline Miller, Circe (2018)
- Steven Pressfield, Last of the Amazons (2002)
- Mary Renault, "Thesead"
  - The King Must Die (1958)
  - The Bull from the Sea (1962)
- Tony Robinson & Richard Curtis, Theseus: The King Who Killed the Minotaur (1988)
- Fred Saberhagen, Ariadne's Web (2000)
- Ian Serraillier, The Way of Danger (1962)
- Althea Urn, Five Miles from Candia (1959)

===== Miscellaneous Minoan =====
- Moyra Caldecott, The Lily and the Bull (1979)
- Paul Capon, The Kingdom of the Bulls (1961)
- Kristmann Gudmundsson, Winged Citadel (1940)
- Nikos Kazantzakis, At the Palaces of Knossos (1981)
- Dmitri Merezhkovsky, The Birth of the Gods (1924)
- S.V. Peddle (Vince Peddle & Sandra Peddle), The Moon Maiden (2003)
- Richard Purtill
  - The Golden Gryphon Feather (1979)
  - The Stolen Goddess (1980)
- Thomas Burnett Swann
  - The Forest of Forever (1971)
  - Cry Silver Bells (1977)
  - The Day of the Minotaur (1966)
- James Watson, The Bull Leapers (1970)

==== Hercules, Jason et al. ====
- Ivor Bannet, The Amazons (1948)
- Otar Chiladze, A Man Was Going Down the Road (1973)
- John Gregory Betancourt
  - Hercules: The Gates of Hades (2001)
  - Hercules: The Vengeance of Hera (1997)
  - Hercules: The Wrath of Poseidon (1997)
- Anne Carson, Autobiography of Red (1998)
- Ken Catran, Voyage with Jason (2000)
- Keith DeCandido
  - Cheiron's Warriors (1999)
  - The Ares Alliance (2000)
- Tobias Druitt, Corydon and the Island of Monsters (2005)
- Robert Graves, The Golden Fleece (U.K.) a.k.a. Hercules, My Shipmate (U.S.) (1945)
- Kerry Greenwood, Medea (1997)
- Edison Marshall, Earth Giant (1960)
- Fred Saberhagen
  - God of the Golden Fleece (2001)
  - The Arms of Hercules (2000)
  - The Face of Apollo (1999)
- Ian Serraillier, The Clashing Rocks (1963)
- Miranda Seymour, Medea (1972)
- Henry Treece, Jason (1961)
- Christa Wolf, Medea: A Novel (1998)
- Jane Yolen & Robert J. Harris, Jason and the Gorgon's Blood (2004)

==== Trojan War ====
- Pat Barker, The Silence of the Girls (2018)
- Marion Zimmer Bradley, The Firebrand (1987)
- Nancy Bogen, Klytaimnestra, Who Stayed at Home (1980)
- Lindsay Clarke, The War at Troy (2004)
- Elizabeth Cook, Achilles (2003)
- Caroline B. Cooney, Goddess of Yesterday (2002) (a.k.a. On the Seas to Troy, UK, 2004)
- Donald Cotton, The Myth Makers, a Doctor Who serial (1965)
- Gordon Doherty
  - The Crimson Throne (2021)
  - The Shadow of Troy (2021)
  - The Dark Earth (2022)
- Bernard Evslin, The Trojan War (1971)
- David Gemmell
  - Troy: Lord of the Silver Bow (2005)
  - Troy: Shield of Thunder (2006)
  - Troy: Fall of Kings (2007)
- Adèle Geras, Troy (2000)
- Noel B. Gerson, The Trojan (1962)
- Roger Lancelyn Green, The Luck of Troy (1961)
- Judith Hand, The Amazon and the Warrior (2004)
- Terence Hawkins, The Rage of Achilles (2009)
- Natalie Haynes, A Thousand Ships (2019)
- Tom Holland, The Poison in the Blood (2006)
- Jack Lindsay, Cressida's First Lover (1931)
- Valerio Massimo Manfredi, The Talisman of Troy (2004)
- Colleen McCullough, The Song of Troy (1998)
- Maude Meagher, The Green Scamander (1933)
- Mark Merlis, An Arrow's Flight (1998)
- Madeline Miller, The Song of Achilles (2011)
- Christopher Morley, The Trojan Horse (1937)
- Phillip Parotti
  - The Greek Generals Talk (1986)
  - The Trojan Generals Talk (1988)
- Richard Powell, Whom the Gods Would Destroy (1970)
- Laura Riding, A Trojan Ending (1937)
- S.P. Somtow, The Shattered Horse (1986)
- S. M. Stirling
  - Against the Tide of Years (1999)
  - On the Oceans of Eternity (2000)
- Rex Stout, The Great Legend (1916)
- Henry Treece, The Windswept City (1967)
- Barry Unsworth, The Songs of the Kings (2002)
- Tyrone Walls, To Die Like an Amazon (2002)

==== Helen ====
- John Erskine, The Private Life of Helen of Troy (1925)
- Margaret George, Helen of Troy (2006)
- H. Rider Haggard & Andrew Lang, The World's Desire (1890)
- Eva Hemmer Hansen, Scandal in Troy (1956)
- Kevin Mathews, Helen of Troy (1965)
- Richard Purtill, The Mirror of Helen (1983)
- Miranda Seymour, Goddess (1979)
- Edward Lucas White, Helen (1925)

==== Cassandra ====
- Hilary Bailey, Cassandra, Princess of Troy (1993)
- Marion Zimmer Bradley, The Firebrand (1987)
- Kerry Greenwood, Cassandra (1995)
- Ursule Molinaro, The Autobiography of Cassandra, Princess and Prophetess of Troy (1979)
- Georgia Sallaska, Priam's Daughter (1970)
- Christa Wolf, Cassandra (1983)

==== Odysseus ====
- John Arden, Cogs Tyrannic (1991)
- Margaret Atwood, The Penelopiad (2005)
- Lindsay Clarke, The Return from Troy (2005)
- H. C. Crew, The Lost King (1929)
- John Erskine, Penelope's Man: The Homing Instinct (1928)
- François Fénelon, The Adventures of Telemachus (1699)
- Adèle Geras, Ithaka (2000)
- Robert Graves, Homer's Daughter (1955)
- Eyvind Johansson, Return to Ithaca (1952)
- Eden Phillpotts, Circé's Island (1926)
- Tony Robinson & Richard Curtis
  - Odysseus: The Greatest Hero of Them All (1986)
  - Odysseus: The Journey through Hell (1987)
- Paul Shipton, The Pig Scrolls (2004)
- Ernst Schnabel, The Voyage Home (1958)
- Jane Yolen & Robert J. Harris, Odysseus in the Serpent Maze (2001)

==== Miscellaneous Mycenaean ====
- John Barth, Chimera (1972)
- Roberto Calasso, The Marriage of Cadmus and Harmony (1993)
- Paul Capon
  - Warrior's Moon (1960)
  - Lord of the Chariots (1962)
- Maurice Druon, The Memoirs of Zeus (1964)
- John Erskine, Venus: The Lonely Goddess (1949)
- Jackie French, Oracle (2010)
- Roger Lancelyn Green, The Land Beyond the North (1958)
- Kerry Greenwood, Electra (1996)
- Victoria Grossack & Alice Underwood, Iokaste (2004)
- Pierre Louys, The Twilight of The Nymphs (1928)
- Ursule Molinaro, Power Dreamers: The Jocasta Complex (1995)
- Phillip Parotti, Fires in the Sky (1990)
- John Cowper Powys, Atlantis (1954)
- Steven Pressfield, Last of the Amazons (2002)
- Mary Ray
  - Standing Lions (1968)
  - Shout against the Wind (1970)
  - Song of Thunder (1978)
  - The Golden Bees (1984)
- Georgia Sallaska
  - Three Ships and Three Kings (1969)
  - The Last Heracles (1974)
- Gladys Schmitt, Electra (1966)
- Ian Serraillier, The Gorgon's Head (1961)
- Ivan Yefremov, The Land of Foam (1958)
- George Shipway
  - Warrior in Bronze (1977)
  - King in Splendour (1979)
- Henry Treece
  - The Golden One (1961)
  - Electra (1963)
  - Oedipus (1964)

==== Based on a television program ====
- Mel Odom, Young Hercules (1999)

=== Archaic Greece ===
==== Sappho ====
- Peter Green, The Laughter of Aphrodite (1965)
- Erica Jong, Sappho's Leap (2003)
- Martha Rofheart, Burning Sappho (1974)
- Thomas Burnett Swann, Wolfwinter (1972)

==== Aesop ====
- John Vornholt, The Fabulist (1993)

==== Miscellaneous Archaic ====
- Georg Ebers, An Egyptian Princess (1864)
- Ernst Eckstein, Aphrodite (1886)
- Nigel Frith, Olympiad (1988)
- Tom Holt, Olympiad (2000)
- David Pownall, The Sphinx and the Sybarites (1993)
- Mary Ray, The Voice of Apollo (1964)
- Mary Renault, The Praise Singer (1979)
- George R. Stewart, Years of the City (1955)
- Melas Kadmidis, The Second Odyssey (2026)

=== 5th century BCE ===
==== Persian Wars ====
- John Buchan, The Moon Endureth (short story "The Lemnian") (1912)
- John Burke, The Lion of Sparta (1961)
- Christian Cameron, The Long War
  - Killer of Men (2010)
  - Marathon (2011)
  - Poseidon's Spear (2012)
  - The Great King (2014)
  - Salamis (2015)
  - The Rage of Ares (2016)
- William Stearns Davis, A Victor of Salamis: A Tale of the Days of Xerxes, Leonidas, and Themistocles (1907)
- Clare Winger Harris, Persephone of Eleusis (1923)
- Edward Bulwer-Lytton, Pausanias, the Spartan (1873)
- Valerio Massimo Manfredi, Spartan (2002)
- Jon Edward Martin, In Kithairon's Shadow (2003)
- Roderick Milton, Tell Them in Sparta (1962)
- Margarett Mirley
  - The Leave-Takers (2004)
  - Dream-Thoughts (2004)
  - Trysts (2004)
- Steven Pressfield, Gates of Fire (1998)
- Mary Renault, The Lion in the Gateway (1964)
- Caroline Snedeker
  - The Perilous Seat (1923)
  - The Spartan (1911)
- L. Sprague de Camp, The Dragon of the Ishtar Gate (1961)
- Gore Vidal, Creation (1982)
- Jill Paton Walsh, Farewell, Great King (1972)
- Gene Wolfe
  - Soldier of the Mist (1986)
  - Soldier of Arete (1989)
  - Soldier of Sidon (2006)

==== Pericles and/or Aspasia ====
- Gertrude Atherton, The Immortal Marriage (1927)
- Taylor Caldwell, Glory and the Lightning (1974)
- L. Sprague de Camp, The Glory That Was (1952)
- Robert Hamerling, Aspasia (1875)
- W. Savage Landor, Pericles and Aspasia (1836)
- Margery Lawrence, The Gate of Yesterday (1960)
- Rex Warner, Pericles the Athenian (1963)

==== Alcibiades ====
- Gertrude Atherton, The Jealous Gods (1928)
- Charles H. Bromby, Alkibiades (1905)
- Daniel Chavarría, The Eye of Cybele (2002)
- Anna Bowman Dodd, On the Knees of the Gods (1908)
- Peter Green, Achilles His Armour (1955)
- Gertrude R. Levy, The Violet Crown (1954)
- M. Pardoe, Argle's Oracle (1959)
- Steven Pressfield, Tides of War (2000)
- Rosemary Sutcliff, The Flowers of Adonis (1969)

==== Socrates ====
- Paul Levinson, The Plot to Save Socrates (2006)
- Cora Mason, Socrates (1953)
- Fritz Mauthner, Mrs. Socrates (1926)
- Mary Renault, The Last of the Wine (1956)
- Geoffrey Trease, The Crown of Violet a.k.a. Web of Traitors (U.S.) (1952)

==== Miscellaneous 5th century ====
- A. J. Church, Callias: A Tale of the Fall of Athens (1892)
- I. O. Evans, Olympic Runner (1955)
- Richard Garfinkle, Celestial Matters (1996)
- Tom Holt, Walled Orchard series
  - Goatsong: A Novel of Ancient Athens (1989)
  - The Walled Orchard (1991)
- John Galen Howard, Pheidias (1929)
- Noel Langley, Nymph in Clover (1948)
- Edward Leatham, Charmione: A Tale of the Great Athenian Revolution (1859)
- Jon Edward Martin, Shades of Artemis (2004)
- Iona McGregor, The Snake and the Olive (1974)
- Naomi Mitchison, Cloud Cuckoo Land (1925)
- George Moore, Aphrodite in Aulis (1931)
- Nicholas Nicastro, The Isle of Stone: A Novel of Ancient Sparta (2005)
- Jan Parandowski, The Olympic Discus (1939)
- Mary Renault
  - The Mask of Apollo (1966)
  - The Praise Singer (1978)
- Caroline Snedeker, Theras and His Town (1925)
- José Carlos Somoza, The Athenian Murders (2002)
- Henry De Vere Stacpoole, The Street of the Flute-Player (1912)
- Arthur S. Way, Sons of the Violet-Crowned (1929)
- Christoph Martin Wieland,
  - The Story of Agathon (1766-7)
  - The Republic of Fools (1774)
- Frank Yerby, Goat Song (1967)

=== 4th century BCE ===
==== Xenophon ====
- Michael Curtis Ford, The Ten Thousand (2001)
- Xenophon of Ephesus, Ephesian Tale of Anthia and Habrocomes (2nd century)

==== Epaminondas ====
- Victor Davis Hanson, The End of Sparta (2011)

==== Philip II of Macedon ====
- Nicholas Guild, The Macedonian (2017)

==== Alexander the Great ====
- Anna Apostolou
  - A Murder in Macedon (1997)
  - A Murder in Thebes (1998)
- Konrad Bercovici, Alexander (1928)
- Ben Bova, Orion and the Conqueror (1994)
- Mary Butts, The Macedonian (1933)
- Christian Cameron, God of War (2012)
- A. J. Church, A Young Macedonian in the Army of Alexander the Great (1890)
- Paul C. Doherty
  - The House of Death (2001)
  - The Godless Man (2002)
  - The Gates of Hell (2003)
- Maurice Druon (Maurice Kessel), Alexander the God (1960)
- David Gemmell
  - Lion of Macedon (1990)
  - Dark Prince (1993)
- Tom Holt, Alexander at the World's End (1999)
- Nikos Kazantzakis, Alexander the Great (1941)
- Harold Lamb, Alexander of Macedon (1946)
- Valerio Massimo Manfredi
  - Alexander: Child of a Dream (2001)
  - Alexander: The Sands of Ammon (2001)
  - Alexander: The Ends of the Earth (2001)
- Klaus Mann, Alexander: a Novel of Utopia 1929)
- Edison Marshall, The Conqueror (1962)
- Aubrey Menen, A Conspiracy of Women (1965)
- Naomi Mitchison, The Young Alexander the Great (1960)
- Marshall Monroe Kirkman
  - Iskander (1903)
  - The Romance of Alexander and Roxana (1909)
  - The Romance of Alexander the King (1909)
- Nicholas Nicastro, Empire of Ashes (2004)
- Scott Oden, Memnon (2006)
- Robert Payne, Alexander the God (1954)
- Steven Pressfield, The Virtues of War (2005)
- Mary Renault, Alexander trilogy
  - Fire from Heaven (1969) — the early life of Alexander the Great
  - The Persian Boy (1972) — Alexander the Great after his conquest of Persia
  - Funeral Games (1981) — the successors of Alexander
- Katherine Roberts, The Mausoleum Murder (2003)
- Melissa Scott, A Choice of Destinies (1986)
- Judith Tarr
  - Lord of the Two Lands (1993)
  - Queen of the Amazons (2004)
- Jakob Wasserman, Alexander in Babylon (1949)
- Ivan Yefremov, Thais of Athens (1972)

==== Miscellaneous 4th century ====
- Gillian Bradshaw, The Sand-Reckoner (2000) about Archimedes
- Bryher, Gate to the Sea (1958)
- Margaret Doody, Aristotle and Stephanos series
  - Aristotle Detective (1978)
  - Aristotle and the Fatal Javelin (1980)
  - Aristotle and Poetic Justice (2000)
  - Aristotle and the Secrets of Life (2002)
  - Anello di bronzo ("Ring of Bronze") (2003)
  - Poison in Athens (2004)
  - Mysteries of Eleusis (2005)
- John Gardner, The Wreckage of Agathon (1970)
- Noel Gerson, The Golden Lyre (1963)
- William Kotzwinkle, Night Book (1974)
- Valerio Massimo Manfredi, Tyrant (2005)
- Ursule Molinaro, The New Moon with the Old Moon in Her Arms (1990)
- Mary Renault, Mask of Apollo (1966)
- Katherine Roberts, The Olympic Conspiracy (2004)
- Barnaby Ross, The Scrolls of Lysis (1962)
- José Carlos Somoza, The Athenian Murders (2002)
- L. Sprague de Camp
  - The Arrows of Hercules (1965)
  - The Bronze God of Rhodes (1960)
  - An Elephant for Aristotle (1958)
- F. Van Wyck Mason, Lysander (1957)
- Peter Vansittart, A Choice of Murder (1992)

=== Hellenistic ===
- Gillian Bradshaw, The Sand-Reckoner (2000)
- Chariton of Aphrodisias, Chaereas and Callirhoe (1st century)
- Christian Cameron
  - Tyrant (2008)
  - Storm of Arrows (2009)
  - Funeral Games (2010)
  - King of the Bosporus (2011)
  - Destroyer of Cities (2013)
  - Force of Kings (2014)
- Alfred Duggan, Elephants and Castles (1963)
- Georg Ebers
  - The Sisters (1880)
  - Arachne (1898)
- I. O. Evans, Strange Devices (1950)
- Vardis Fisher, The Island of the Innocent (1952)
- William Golding, The Double Tongue (1995)
- Joan Grant, Return to Elysium (1947)
- H.D., Hedylus (1928)
- Jack Lindsay, Come Home at Last (1934)
- Naomi Mitchison, The Corn King and the Spring Queen (1930)
- Eden Phillpotts, The Treasures of Typhon (1924)
- Carolyn Snedeker, The Forgotten Daughter (1933)
- L. Sprague de Camp
  - The Bronze God of Rhodes (1960)
  - The Golden Wind (1969)
- Duncan Sprott
  - The House of the Eagle (2004)
  - Daughter of the Crocodile (2006)
- H. N. Turteltaub, "Hellenic Traders" series, set some time after the death of Alexander
  - Over the Wine Dark Sea (2001)
  - The Gryphon's Skull (2002)
  - The Sacred Land (2003)
  - Owls to Athens (2004)
- Thornton Wilder, The Woman of Andros (1930)

=== 1st century BCE ===
- William Golding, The Double Tongue (1995)

=== 2nd century CE ===
- Achilles Tatius, The Adventures of Leucippe and Clitophon (2nd century)
- Heliodorus of Emesa, Aethiopica or Theagenes and Chariclea (2nd century)
- Longus, Daphnis and Chloe (2nd century)
- Lucian, True History (2nd century AD), not necessarily set anywhere near Greece

== Plays ==
- Andrew David Irvine, Socrates on Trial
- Terence Rattigan, Adventure Story
- William Shakespeare, A Midsummer Night's Dream
- William Shakespeare, Timon of Athens
- William Shakespeare, Troilus and Cressida
- William Shakespeare and John Fletcher, The Two Noble Kinsmen

== Comics ==
- Marvel Illustrated, The Iliad
- Marvel Illustrated, The Odyssey
- Marvel Illustrated, The Trojan War
- Frank Miller, 300
- Eric Shanower, Age of Bronze

== See also ==
- List of fiction set in ancient Rome
- List of historical fiction by time period
- List of films set in ancient Greece
