= The Oxford Murders =

The Oxford Murders may refer to:

- The Oxford Murders (novel), novel by the Argentine author Guillermo Martínez
- The Oxford Murders (film), 2008 thriller film adapted from Guillermo Martínez's novel, directed by Álex de la Iglesia
