= Sonia Soto =

Sonia Soto is a translator of Spanish literature into English. She is a past winner (2000) and runner-up (2006) for the Premio Valle-Inclan for Spanish translation.

== Career ==
Soto has worked primarily on bringing Spanish literary works into English, including both fiction and non-fiction. Her translations have been published in the United Kingdom and internationally.

== Awards ==
In 2000, Soto was awarded the Premio Valle-Inclán for Spanish translation, an annual award administered by the Society of Authors in the United Kingdom. She was also the runner-up for the same prize in 2006.

== Books ==
- The Oxford Murders by Guillermo Martinez
- Winter in Lisbon by Antonio Muñoz Molina
- The Club Dumas by Arturo Perez Reverte
- The Wind from the East by Almudena Grandes
- The Athenian Murders by Jose Carlos Somoza

== See also ==
- Premio Valle-Inclán
- List of literary translators
