= Praise singer (disambiguation) =

Praise singers or Griots are orators and singers in West Africa.

Praise singer may also refer to:

- Imbongi, a term used for praise singers in Southern Africa
- The Praise Singer, a historical novel
