= Mary Ray =

Mary Ray may refer to:

- Mary Ellen Ray (1931–2004), American-born actress in the UK
- Mary Ray (author) (1932–2003), British children's author
- Mary Josephine Ray (1895–2010), Canadian supercentenarian
- Mary Lyn Ray (born 1946), American author, conservationist, and historic preservationist
- Mary Ray (dog trainer), British dog trainer
- Mary Ruth Ray (1956–2013), American classical musician
