= The King Must Die =

Novel by Mary Renault

- Author: Mary Renault
- Cover artist: Eric Carle
- Language: English
- Genre: Historical novel
- Publisher: Longmans (UK); Pantheon Books (US)
- Publication date: 1958
- Publication place: South Africa
- Media type: Print (Paperback)
- Pages: 352 p. (Vintage ed.)338 p. (Modern edition)
- ISBN: 0-394-75104-3
- OCLC: 15595010
- Dewey Decimal: 823/.912 19
- LC Class: PR6035.E55 K56 1988
- Followed by: The Bull from the Sea

The King Must Die is a 1958 bildungsroman and historical novel by Mary Renault that traces the early life and adventures of Theseus, a hero in Greek mythology. It is set in locations throughout Ancient Greece: Troizen, Corinth, Eleusis, Athens, Knossos in Crete, and Naxos. Renault wrote a sequel, The Bull from the Sea, in 1962.

A primary theme of the book is the contrast between the advanced but enervated civilisation of Minoan Crete and the assertive developing societies of mainland Greece.

== Plot ==
The story is told by Theseus, looking back on his life from his vantage point as an adult.

=== Book One: Troizen ===
Theseus, growing up in Troizen, is the son of a priestess and an unknown man, although it is rumored that his father is Poseidon. As a young child, Theseus is shocked when he sees the "King Horse", whom he considers a noble beast, ritually sacrificed to the gods. His grandfather King Pittheus explains that the King was traditionally killed with the Horse, and even now a true king of the Hellene people may need to make the ultimate sacrifice for his people. It is during the horse sacrifice that Theseus first hears a surging sea-sound in his ears, a sense that an earthquake will soon occur.

Over the following years, Theseus serves at Poseidon's temple. He is sent to hide in the hills when Cretan ships come to Troizen to take away young boys and girls as tribute to Minos for the bull dancing in Crete. Theseus is frustrated because he is shorter and lighter than most Hellenes his age, but becomes a skilled wrestler through strategy and agility.

When Theseus turns seventeen, his mother takes him to the sacred Grove of Zeus in the hills and explains that his father made her swear not to tell Theseus who he was until he could pry up a certain heavy stone. Theseus figures out how to move it using a lever, and finds a sword and sandals underneath. His grandfather explains that Theseus is the only son and heir of King Aigeus of Athens. Theseus decides to go to Athens via the bandit-infested land route: the Isthmus of Corinth.

=== Book Two: Eleusis ===
In Eleusis, a matriarchical and non-Hellene society focused on worship of the Earth mother goddess, it is the custom to sacrifice their king each year. Entering Eleusis, Theseus is chosen to kill Kerkyon, the year-king, and replace him. He soon learns that the Queen rules in Eleusis. As King, he has no real power and will die in one year's time. He takes his guard of Eleusinian youths on hunts to build their independence and camaraderie, killing the great sow Phaia and making war on brigands. The Queen, who correctly anticipates that Theseus is trying to overthrow the established order, tries to have him assassinated but fails. She is bitten by a venomous snake during a suicide attempt. Theseus allows her to leave Eleusis apparently to die, although he later acknowledges that he does not know her fate.

=== Book Three: Athens ===
Theseus finally goes to Athens. Aigeus, on the urging of his lover Medea, serves him poisoned wine but recognises Theseus's sword and realizes who he is just in time. When Medea's plot fails, she pronounces a curse on Theseus and vanishes from Athens. Aigeus proclaims Theseus his son and heir.

When a Cretan ship comes to collect a yearly tribute of seven boys and seven girls from Athens, Theseus, feeling led by Poseidon, offers himself in one boy's place and becomes a Cretan slave.

=== Book Four: Crete ===
In Crete, Theseus and the other tributes – under the team name of Cranes – become bull-dancers. They develop a strong unity and survive for months without a single member dying, which is unheard of. Adapting to the cultured society of the Minoan court, Theseus becomes the lover of Ariadne, the young princess who ranks as "Goddess on Earth" in the formerly matriarchal hierarchy. They meet secretly in the tunnels beneath the sprawling Knossos Palace, which is called the Labyrinth.

Theseus envisages conquering Crete, which has become an indolent, effete civilisation; though much more sophisticated and advanced than the mainland kingdoms. The king, Minos, is wasting away from leprosy due to the machinations of his brutish heir Asterion, whose title is Minotaur. Asterion is gathering power to take the throne, which will include wedding Ariadne, his half-sister. Theseus meets with the dying Minos and plans are made to foil Asterion. Ultimately Theseus slays Minos at the latter's request, promising to marry Ariadne.

Immediately after the death of Minos, Theseus senses a major approaching earthquake. As the quake strikes, he leads the bull-dancers and Cretan serfs in a revolt against the aristocracy of the Labyrinth. Asterion is already taking part in the ritual to make himself the new Minos, wearing a bull mask. Theseus interrupts the ceremony and fatally wounds the Minotaur in combat. Seeing that Asterion had already been anointed with oil, Theseus puts on the mask and sacrifices the dying Asterion, using a sacred axe.

=== Book Five: Naxos ===
The Cranes, plus Ariadne – whom Theseus intends to marry – set sail for Greece. They land on the island of Dia, whose city is Naxos. The people welcome Ariadne as the Goddess on Earth, and she takes part in their rituals to Dionysos in which they sacrifice their year king. At the same time, Theseus ends up joining in a Maenean orgy. Afterwards, Theseus finds Ariadne asleep drenched in the king’s blood and clutching a body part. He realizes that, born of an old and decadent line, his lover has played a brutal part in the sacrifice. Appalled, he gathers his companions and sets sail before she wakes; even knowing she would be heartbroken by his departure and possibly believe he took another woman with him in her place.

As they travel home, Theseus remembers Aigeus's request that he paint his sail white. He is concerned that Aigeus will read the white sail as a sign to sacrifice himself. He asks Poseidon for a sign, and reads it to mean that he should do nothing, never anticipating that Aigeus will throw himself to his death when he sees the black sail.

== Characters ==
Theseus: The protagonist. King of Eleusis and son of King Aigeus of Athens, he is an aggressive leader who combines touchy pride with a drive for social and cultural change. He compensates for his small, light build with agility and ingenuity. He has a strong sense of destiny, duty, and a belief that he is guided by his god Poseidon. Though only seventeen for most of the novel, he is also a skilled warrior, hunter, bull-dancer, and lover. He can instinctively sense earthquakes, a sensation which leaves him disoriented, and which he believes is a gift from Poseidon.

Ariadne: The beautiful young daughter of King Minos. High Priestess by right of birth, she is revered as a goddess incarnate by the native Cretans. Gentle and timid at first, she falls in love with Theseus and helps him escape from Crete. When Theseus sees her hidden capacity for violence as inherited from the "rotten blood" of a decadent dynasty, he is sickened and loses his love for her. Abandoned by Theseus, Ariadne remains on Dia until she dies in childbirth in the sequel "Bull From the Sea".

Asterion: The Minotauros. He is heir to King Minos of Crete, though actually the product of adultery between Minos' queen and an Assyrian bull-dancer. Crude, ruthless and clever, Asterion has succeeded in isolating his nominal father, the dying Minos, and is positioning himself to take the throne. Asterion regards Theseus as a "mainland savage" but, desiring the best of everything, purchases the Eleusian leader as a bull-dancer in the way that he might buy a horse with stamina and speed.

Minos: the title given to the rulers of Minoan Crete during the thousand-year history of an advanced and sophisticated civilisation centred on the vast palace (Labyrinth) of Knossos. On the eve of the great earthquake that destroys the Labyrinth, the last Minos is a sick man who is losing power to his hated heir Asterion. Using Ariadne as an intermediary, Minos enters into an alliance with Theseus.

Aigeus: The King of Athens and Theseus's father. A valiant and virile man in his younger days, he is in his fifties, tired and cynical by the time Theseus meets him. His people are troublesome, his nobles powerful, and he is worn out from decades of endeavouring to keep the peace and retain his authority. Theseus respects Aigeus but cannot admire him, for he is over-cautious.

Aithra: The 33-year-old high priestess of Troizen, Theseus's mother, and Pittheus's daughter. There is tension between her natural affection for Theseus and her role as a servant of the Earth Goddess.

Medea: King Aigeus's lover, she wants the Athenian throne for her two sons. Acting in collaboration with Persephone she persuades Aigeus to attempt to poison Theseus in return for the lifting of a curse. Aigeus is not at this stage aware that Theseus is his son.

Phaedra: younger sister of Ariadne; and Theseus' later wife. At this date only a child, she idolises him as a handsome bull dancer.

Persephone: The 27-year-old queen of Eleusis, whom no one is permitted to name. Beautiful, sexually skilled, and devoted to the earth goddess, she follows the custom of making Theseus kill her current husband and King so that he can become the next one-year king and marry her. But he turns out to be more than she bargained for, empowering himself and the downtrodden men of Eleusis, finally using his personal and political skills to persuade the men to impose their rule on the women instead. Four times she attempts to kill him or have him killed, and attempts suicide when she fails. Her ultimate fate is not known.

Amyntor: An Eleusinian bull-dancer, Theseus's right-hand among the Cranes in Crete. A big, black-haired, hawk-nosed teenager, he is too heavy for bull-leaping, so he serves to catch the leaper as he or she descends. Theseus trusts Amyntor and appoints him as captain of his guard in the sequel "Bull From the Sea"

Pittheus: The King of Troizen and Theseus's grandfather. Theseus looks up to him.

Xanthos: The cold-hearted, red-haired, pale-faced brother of Queen Persephone of Eleusis, and the chief general of the Eleusinians. On his sister's orders, he tries to have Theseus assassinated. Theseus then kills him in single combat.

Pylas: The prince of Megara. Theseus meets him on the boar hunt in the hills between Eleusis and Megara. Only a few years older than Theseus, he nevertheless respects the other's prowess and intelligence, and joins him to assault the bandit strongholds in the Isthmus. He dies of a wound received in battle.

The Corinthian: The best bull-dancer in Crete – until he lays down his life in the ring for a comrade soon after the Cranes arrive. Theseus idolises him because he is such a consummate bull-dancer.

Chryse, Helike, Melantho, Thebe, Nephele, Rhene, Pylia: The seven female Cranes. Like their male counterparts they are varied in personality and background but all are brought together by loyalty to Theseus and the interdependence required by the bull dance.

Iros, Hippon, Menesthes, Telamon, Phormion: The five male Cranes (apart from Theseus and Amyntor).

Aktor: veteran trainer of the bull-dancers in the Bull Court of Knossos Palace.

Lukos: a Cretan officer who commands a detachment of African warriors in the service of King Minos. Sent to collect the tribute of fourteen youths and maidens from Athens, Lukos serves as an example of the polished and sophisticated courtiers of the Labyrinth in contrast to the crude but energetic values of mainland Greece.

Alektryon: a lieutenant of the royal household who acts as an intermediary between the bull-dancers and those palace officials and guards still loyal to Minos. He dies in the great earthquake.

Kerkyon: The 20-year-old, strongly built year-king of Eleusis. The name 'Kerkyon' is given to all year-kings: his real name is not given. Theseus kills him in a wrestling match.

Thalestris: A skilled Amazonian bull-dancer and valiant warrior. She is killed in the fighting with Asterion's guards but knowing her gives Theseus a premonition of his doomed future marriage with another Amazon.

Simo: A small boy who mocks Theseus's fatherlessness in Troizen.

== Analysis ==
The book was lauded by critics, with Renault's believable historical setting being particularly well-received. Removing the fantastical elements of monsters and the appearances of gods, Renault constructed an archaeologically and anthropologically plausible story that might have developed into the myth. However, other critics have viewed Renault's depiction of ancient Crete as based on flawed theories and taking significant imaginative liberties.

== Adaptations and references ==
The King Must Die and The Bull from the Sea were adapted into an 11-part BBC Radio 4 serial, entitled The King Must Die, broadcast from June through August 1983.

Poul Anderson's novel The Dancer from Atlantis covers the same period, but from a pro-Cretan point of view – Theseus being the book's villain, a barbarian pirate and cruel destroyer of Cretan civilisation. In one passage the protagonist – a time traveller from the 20th Century who had read and liked Renault's book – reflects on how different the actual Theseus is from the way she depicted him.

In Richard Adams's book Watership Down, the 25th chapter (entitled "The Raid") begins with this epigraph quoted from Renault's book: "He went consenting, or else he was no king... It was no man's place to say to him, 'It is time to make the offering.'"

Suzanne Collins credited The King Must Die as one inspiration for The Hunger Games, with the concept of boys and girls taken by lottery to perform in a deadly competition for the elites' entertainment.

== See also ==
- Fiction set in Ancient Greece
