= Almudena Grandes =

Spanish writer (1960–2021)

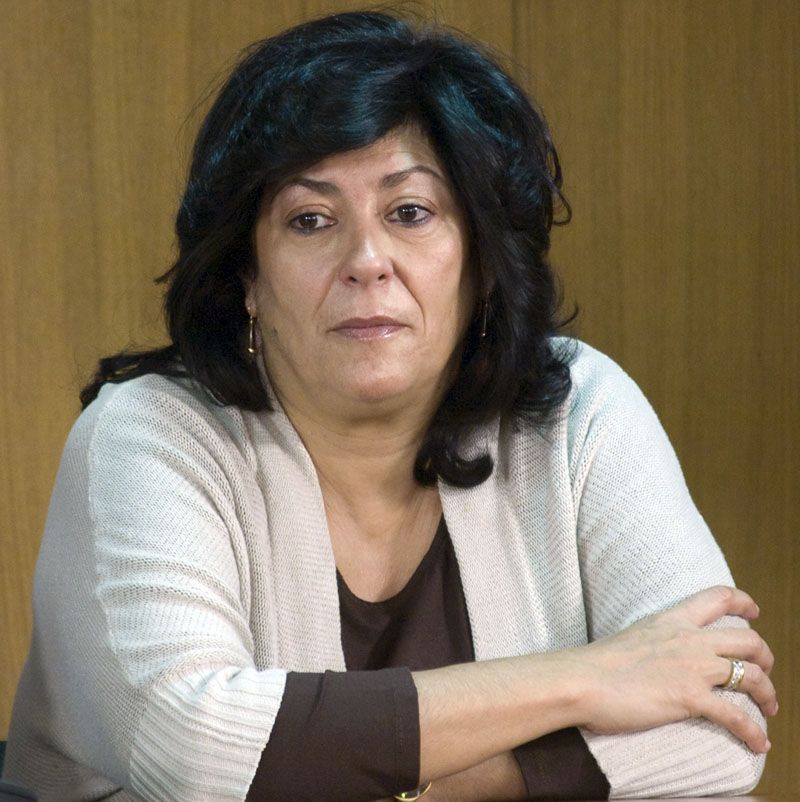
- Grandes in 2011
- Born: María de la Almudena Grandes Hernández; 7 May 1960; Madrid, Spain
- Died: 27 November 2021 (aged 61); Madrid, Spain
- Occupation: Writer
- Spouse: Luis García Montero (m. 1994)
- Children: 3
- Awards: National Literature Prize for Narrative (2018); Sor Juana Inés de la Cruz Prize (2011)
- Writing career
- Language: Spanish
- Genre: Fiction
- Website: almudenagrandes.com

María de la Almudena Grandes Hernández (7 May 1960 – 27 November 2021) was a Spanish writer. Author of 14 novels and three short-story collections, her work has been translated into twenty languages and frequently adapted to film. She won the National Literature Prize for Narrative and the Prix Méditerranée among other honors. Spanish Prime Minister Pedro Sánchez called her "one of the most important writers of our time."

== Early life and career ==
Almudena Grandes was born on 7 May 1960 in the Chamartín neighborhood of Madrid, Spain. She began writing when she was nine and obtained a degree in Geography and History at the Complutense University of Madrid. Following her degree, she started out writing texts for encyclopedias. Drawing on her experiences during the Movida Madrileña, she published her first novel in 1989, Las edades de Lulú, an erotic and unbridled novel that achieved great success and won La Sonrisa Vertical prize, having been translated into twenty languages thus far. Director Bigas Luna made a film out of her novel, The Ages of Lulu, starring Javier Bardem. Emilie L. Bergmann said, the novel "represented a breakthrough for eroticism in women's writing" having sold more than 1.5 million copies worldwide.

Her second novel, Te llamaré Viernes, was published in 1991 and was adapted for cinema by Gerardo Herrero in 1996. That year, she also published Modelos de mujer. The publication of her third novel, Malena es un nombre de tango, in 1994 was also a great success.

Later she published Atlas de geografía humana in 1998 (which was transformed into a film by Azucena Rodríguez), Los aires difíciles, in 2002, Castillos de cartón in 2004 and El corazón helado in 2007.

In 2010, she published the novel Inés y la alegría, the first in a series of six novels entitled Episodios de una Guerra Interminable. This novel narrates episodes of the anti-Francoist resistance. With Inés y la alegría, she won the "Sor Juana Inés de la Cruz" literature prize. It was followed by El lector de Julio Verne in 2012, Las tres bodas de Manolita in 2014 and Los pacientes del doctor García in 2017, the latter of which led her to win the National Literature Prize for Narrative. Her last finished novel, La madre de Frankenstein, was published in 2020. In it, she contemplated the life of Aurora Rodríguez Carballeira, a woman in 20th-century Spain who shot her own daughter rather than lose control of her.

== Style ==
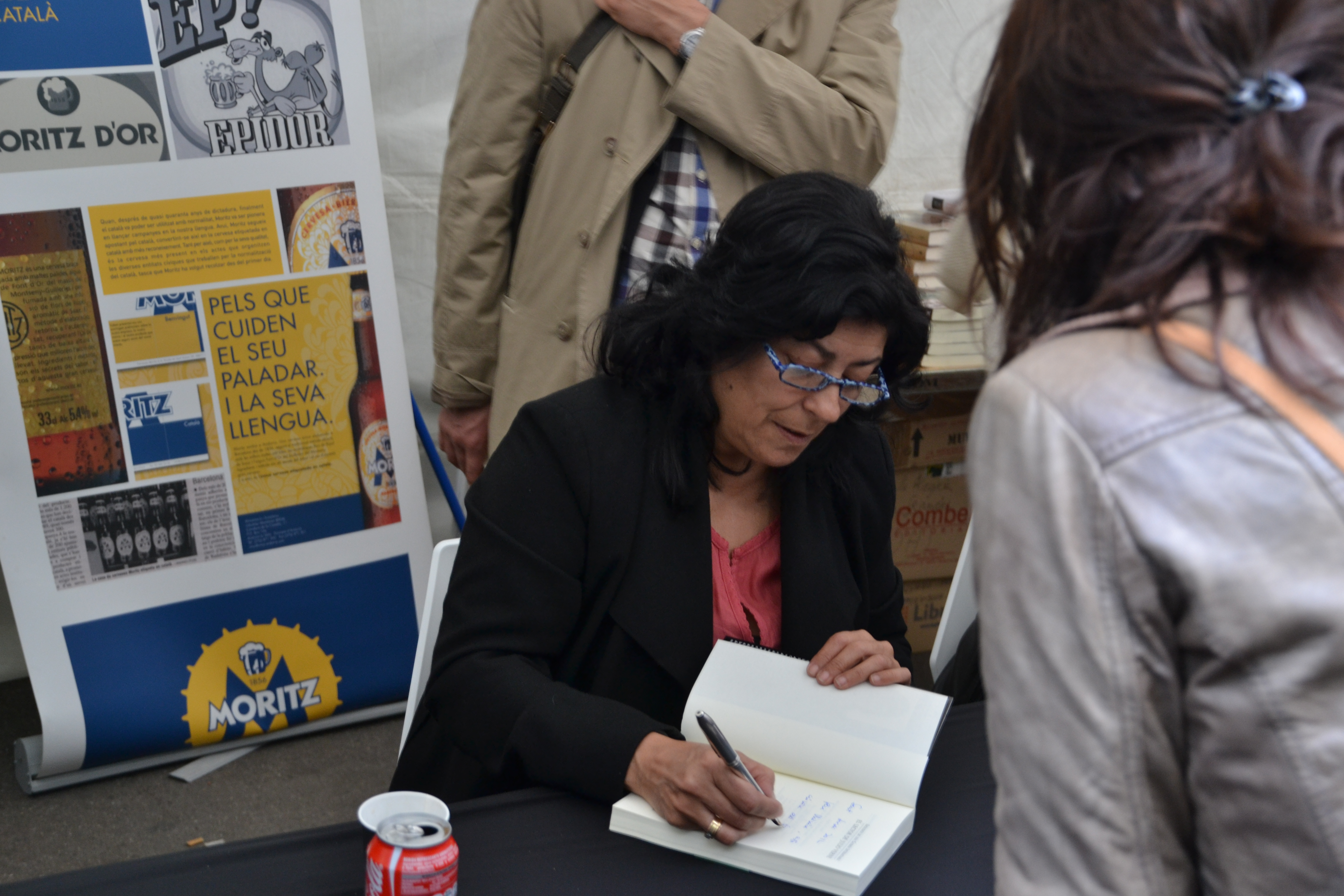
Grandes signing books in London, 2012

Grandes' literary work was influenced by 19th century Spanish writers Emilia Pardo Bazán and Benito Pérez Galdós, among others. Her books speak about the Spanish people in the last quarter of the 20th century and the first years of the 21st century, in a style characterized by realism and psychological introspection.

When she was a child, her grandfather gave her Odyssey by Homer and she considered that, together with Don Quixote, they were the two major influences for her work and particularly for her interest in characters who were survivor archetypes, muddling through their circumstances one way or another, as opposed to heroes and antiheroes.

Grandes was politically left-wing, and her work revolves around Francisco Franco's regime and the impact it had on democracy.

== Views and activism ==
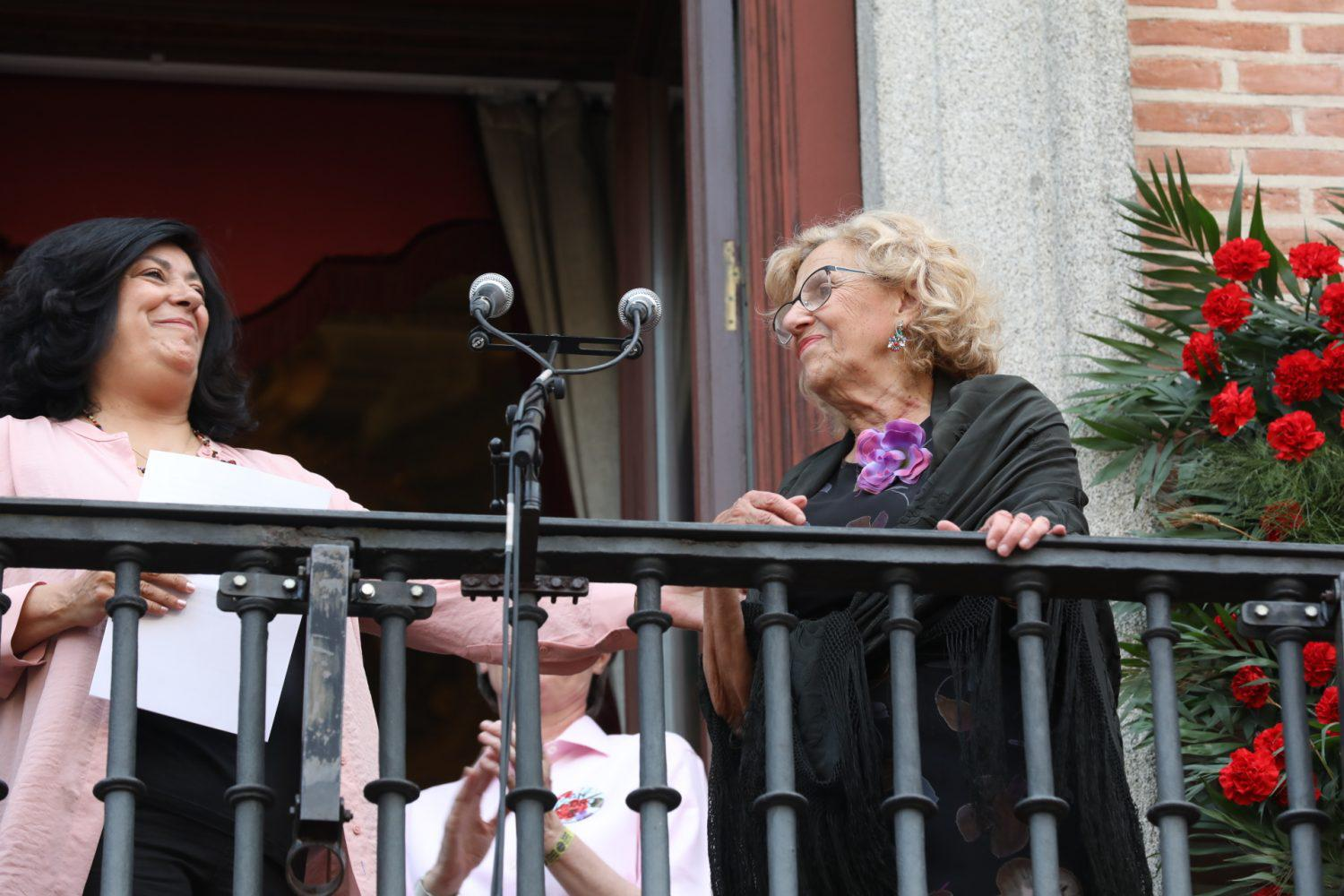
Almudena Grandes with then-mayor of Madrid Manuela Carmena, 2018

Grandes was a vocal leftist, saying that it was reading that led her to these politics. On several occasions she voted for the United Left party. She was a regular columnist of the newspaper El País and a contributor to radio programs such as Cadena SER. She also considered herself anticlerical and republican.

In April 2007, Grandes was one of the signatories of a manifesto, in which a group of intellectuals considered it unacceptable to commit acts of terrorism; in addition, during the demonstration after ETA's attack on Madrid Airport, she read the statement "For peace, life, liberty and against terrorism." That attack, in which two people died, marked the end of a ceasefire during which ETA had been in negotiation with the government of Jose Luis Rodriguez Zapatero. Grandes also gave her opinion about Spanish society, which she argued had become dumb and vulgar, and blighted by consumerism, materialism, and indifference to suffering. In Los besos en el pan (2015), she wrote about the Spanish crisis of 2008 and claimed that humility was the only way to get rid of it.

Grandes harshly criticized right-wing parties and politicians, and also left-wing ones, especially during the constitutional crisis in Catalonia. She was also involved in the feminist movement, and was present during feminist demonstrations and protests.

She was also a tireless social activist. In 1998 she was a member of Izquierda Abierta and showed support for the self-incrimination of Ramona Maneiro. Maneiro had assisted her partner Ramón Sampedro in euthanasia.

== Personal life and death ==
Grandes married poet Luis García Montero in 1994, with whom she had one daughter. From a previous marriage she had one son. She was a fan of Atlético Madrid.

In October 2021, Grandes announced that she was suffering from cancer, which had been diagnosed in the previous year. She died on 27 November 2021, at the age of 61.

== Works ==
=== Novels ===
- Las edades de Lulú (Tusquets, 1989)
  - The Ages of Lulu. Translated by Sonia Soto. Weidenfeld & Nicolson. 2005. ISBN 84-7223-748-6.
- Te llamaré Viernes Tusquets, 1991, ISBN 84-7223-835-0
- Malena es un nombre de tango Tusquets, 1994, ISBN 84-8310-655-8; Tusquets, 2008, ISBN 978-84-8383-513-5
- Atlas de geografía humana Tusquets, 1998, ISBN 84-8310-073-8
- Los aires difíciles Tusquets, 2002
  - The Wind from the East. Translated by Sonia Soto. Weidenfeld & Nicolson. 2007. ISBN 978-1-58322-746-6.
- Castillos de cartón Tusquets, 2004, ISBN 84-8310-259-5
- El corazón helado Tusquets, 2007 ISBN 978-84-8310-373-9
  - The Frozen Heart Weidenfeld & Nicolson, 2010, translated by Frank Wynne; Orion Publishing Group, Limited, 2010, ISBN 978-0-7538-2313-2
- Ines y la alegria Tusquets, 2010, ISBN 978-60-7421-208-2
- El lector de Julio Verne Tusquets, 2012, ISBN 978-84-8383-400-8
- Las tres bodas de Manolita Tusquets, 2014, ISBN 978-84-8383-845-7
- Los besos en el pan Tusquets, 2015, ISBN 978-84-9066-191-8
- Los Pacientes del Doctor García, 2017 - Premio Nacional de Narrativa 2018
- La madre de Frankenstein, Tusquets, 2020 ISBN 978-84-9066-780-4
- Todo va a mejorar, Tusquets, 2022 ISBN 978-84-1107-183-3

=== Short story collections ===
- Modelos de mujer (Tusquets, 1996) (ISBN 84-8310-602-7)
- Mercado de Barceló, 2003 (ISBN 84-8310-881-X)
- Estaciones de paso (Tusquets, 2005) (ISBN 84-8310-312-5)

== Awards and recognition ==
- La Sonrisa Vertical Award 1989 for Las edades de Lulú.
- Coherence Award (2002)
- Julián Besteiro Award for the Arts and Literature (2002)
- Cálamo Award for Best Book of the Year for Los aires difíciles (2003)
- Crisol Award for Los aires difíciles (2003)
- The municipal library of Azuqueca de Henares, inaugurated in October 2006, bears her name
- José Manuel Lara Foundation Award for El corazón helado (2008)
- Madrid Booksellers Guild Award for El corazón helado (2008)
- Prix Méditerranée (2009)
- Premio de la Crítica de Madrid for Inés y la alegría (2010)
- Premio Iberoamericano de Novela Elena Poniatowska 2011 for Inés y la alegría (2011)
- Sor Juana Inés de la Cruz Prize for Inés y la alegría (2011)
- The Infant and Primary Education Center (CEIP) of the Las Morillas neighborhood (Málaga) is named after her
- Atocha International Lawyers of Atocha Award (2017)
- Liber Prize (2018)
- National Literature Prize for Narrative (2018)
- Honoris Causa by the National University of Distance Education (2020)
- International Journalism Award of the International Press Club (2020)
- Jean-Monnet Prize for European Literature for Los pacientes del Dr. García (2020)
