= Hellenic Traders =

Series of historical fiction books written by H. N. Turteltaub

- ' Over the Wine Dark Sea (2001); The Gryphon's Skull (2002); The Sacred Land (2003); Owls to Athens (2004); Salamis (2020) '
- Author: H.N. Turteltaub
- Country: United States
- Language: English
- Genre: Historical fiction
- Publisher: TOR (first four books); CAEZIK SF & Fantasy (fifth book)
- Published: 2001–2004, 2020
- Media type: Print (hardback & paperback)

Hellenic Traders refers to a series of historical fiction books published by TOR and written by H.N. Turteltaub (a pseudonym of Harry Turtledove).

The books center around cousins Menedemos and Sostratos who work as seaborne traders in the years following the death of Alexander the Great. The series is notable for a high degree of historical accuracy.

After Tor allowed the series to go out of print, PhoenixPick acquired the rights to the series and all four books were reprinted and reissued under Turtledove's name from 2013 to 2015.

The series currently consists of five books:

- Over the Wine Dark Sea (2001, re-released September 2013)
- The Gryphon's Skull (2002, re-released April 2014)
- The Sacred Land (2003, re-released December 2014)
- Owls to Athens (2004, re-released March 2015)
- Salamis (2020) (Note: Harry Turtledove is listed as the author, not the pseudonym H.N. Turteltaub used in the other four books.)

Turtledove's other historical novel, Justinian, set in the early Byzantine Empire, deals with the same geographic area, though it otherwise is not connected with the Hellenic Traders series.
