= Salamis (novel) =

2020 novel by Harry Turtledove

- Cover of first edition
- Author: Harry Turtledove
- Cover artist: Christina P. Myrvold
- Language: English
- Series: Hellenic Traders
- Genre: Historical novel
- Publisher: Caezik SF & Fantasy
- Publication date: 2020
- Publication place: United States
- Media type: Print (paperback, ebook)
- Pages: 267
- ISBN: 9781647100070
- OCLC: 1203937710
- Dewey Decimal: 813/.54 23
- LC Class: PS3570.U76 S25 2020
- Preceded by: Owls to Athens

Salamis is a historical novel written by Harry Turtledove. It was first published in trade paperback and ebook by Arc Manor under its Caezik SF & Fantasy imprint in November 2020. It is the fifth book of the "Hellenic Traders" series of historical novels, previous volumes of which were originally issued under Turtledove's pseudonym H. N. Turteltaub.

== Plot summary ==
In 306 BCE, the city-state of Rhodes strives to maintain its independence during the ongoing struggles for supremacy in the Near East between the successors of Alexander the Great, particularly Antigonos, who controls Asia Minor, and Ptolemaios, who rules Egypt. Forced to pick sides when Antigonos' son Demetrios arrives proposing an alliance against Ptolemaios, the Rhodians, whose prosperity depends largely on trade with Egypt, decline. Demetrios goes on to invade the island of Cyprus, currently ruled by Ptolemaios' brother Menelaos.

Under the guise of a trading mission, Rhodian merchants Menedemos and Sostratos take their ship the Aphrodite to carry word of these developments to Ptolemaios. After fulfilling their mission, the two linger to conduct business in Egypt, Menedemos in the new city of Alexandria and Sostratos in Memphis, taking time to visit the Pyramids and the Sphinx. Ptolemaios builds up a fleet to relieve his brother and drive Demetrios from Cyprus, and forces the Aphrodite to help transport arms for the army he intends to land there.

Menedemos and Sostratos reluctantly follow the fleet to Cyprus, where they peripherally witness Ptolemaios' defeat in the great naval battle of Salamis. Escaping in the aftermath, they bring news of the disaster home to Rhodes, where the weapons the Aphrodite carries can be put to use in defending the city. It is generally expected that Demetrios will inevitably follow up his success in Cyprus by attacking Rhodes.

== Possible sequel ==
The plot of this novel appears to look ahead to the Siege of Rhodes (305–304 BC); based on the series' practice of recounting the annual sailing seasons of successive years in successive books, any sequel would presumably cover some or all of this siege. The period before, during and after the siege is also the subject of L. Sprague de Camp's historical novel The Bronze God of Rhodes.

== Reception ==
Publishers Weekly notes that "Turtledove plays things straight in the fifth alternate [sic] history in his Hellenic Traders series (after 2004's Owls to Athens), taking readers on a slow-building tour of the Mediterranean amid battles over Alexander the Great's empire," concluding "There’s no speculative hook here; instead, Turtledove carefully crafts a detailed and realistic vision of the Greek world in 306 BCE and delivers a humane message of commonality that shines over language barriers and social differences. Readers expecting a twist on the history may be disappointed, but all will be impressed by Turtledove’s immersive ancient world."
