= Coals to Newcastle =

English idiom

Selling, carrying, bringing or taking coal(s) to Newcastle is an idiom of English origin describing a pointless action. It refers to the fact that, historically, the economy of Newcastle upon Tyne, in North East England, was a great centre of coal shipments from nearby mines; therefore any attempt to sell coal to Newcastle would be foolhardy, as supply would be greater there than anywhere else in Britain.

Similarly, Newcastle in New South Wales, which is named after the English city, has after abundant coal deposits and one of the largest coal ports in the world; hence it would also be meaningless to ship coal there.

== History ==
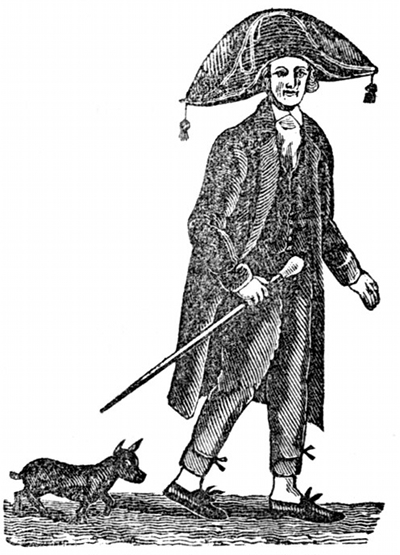
Timothy Dexter sent coals to Newcastle

In 1661–62, John Graunt, in his work on the Bills of Mortality for London, (Note: Published by the Royal Society in 1665.) uses the phrase in his introductory expression of gratitude to Lord Robartes, the Lord Privy Seal: "...I should (according to our English Proverb) thereby carry Coals to Newcastle..." The phrase predates the 1854 great fire of Newcastle and Gateshead by nearly two centuries and is thus not morbid humour in response to the fire.

The phrase is first documented in North America in 1679 in William Fitzhugh's letters: "But relating farther to you would be carrying Coals to new Castle." It appears first in a printed title in Labour in Vain: Or Coals to Newcastle: A Sermon to the People of Queen-Hith, 1709.

Timothy Dexter, an American entrepreneur, purportedly succeeded in defying the idiom in the 18th century by shipping coal to Newcastle. Renowned for his eccentricity and regarded as a buffoon, he was persuaded to sail a shipment of coal to Newcastle by rival merchants plotting to ruin him. He wrote that he instead got a large profit after his cargo arrived during a miners' strike, which had crippled local production.

More prosaically, the American National Coal Association asserted that the United States sold coal profitably to Newcastle in the early 1990s; 70,000 tonnes (69,000 long tons; 77,000 short tons) of low-sulphur coal was imported by Alcan from Russia in 2004 for their local aluminium smelting plant.

Although the coal industry of Newcastle upon Tyne is now practically non-existent, the expression can still be used today with a degree of literal accuracy. Early European settlers discovered and exploited coal deposits at the harbour of Newcastle, Australia. Newcastle has since surpassed its English namesake to become the world’s largest coal-exporting port.

== Contemporary use ==
With the increasing onset of globalisation, parallels in other industries occur; the idiom is now frequently used by the media when reporting business ventures whose success may initially appear just as unlikely. It has been referred to in coverage of:

- The export to India of saffron from Saudi Arabia and chicken tikka masala from the United Kingdom
- The sale of Scottish pizzas to Italy,
- The production of manga versions of William Shakespeare from Cambridge to Japan.

Even though its original geographic origin may have been displaced, this cliché continues to be used.

== See also ==
- Owls to Athens
- Pizza effect
- Samovar - a similar proverb for the Russian language from playwright Anton Chekhov.
