= The Athenian Murders =

Historical mystery novel by José Carlos Somoza

- Author: José Carlos Somoza
- Original title: La caverna de las ideas
- Translator: Sonia Soto
- Cover artist: Juan José Kronovi
- Language: Spanish
- Genre: Historical mystery
- Publisher: Abacus
- Publication date: 2000
- Publication place: Spain
- English publication date: 2002
- Media type: Print (Paperback)
- Pages: 314 p. (paperback edition)
- ISBN: 0-349-11618-0 (paperback edition)
- OCLC: 50935366

The Athenian Murders is a historical mystery novel written by Spanish author José Carlos Somoza. Originally published in Spain under the title La caverna de las ideas (The Cave of Ideas) in 2000, it was translated into English in 2002 by Sonia Soto. The Athenian Murders is Somoza's first novel to be published in English. It won the 2002 Gold Dagger Award.

== Plot summary ==
The book is presented as a translation of an ancient Greek novel published in Athens just after the Peloponnesian War, complete with the extensive footnotes from the scholar performing the translation. In the ancient novel (which is itself called The Athenian Murders), a young ephebe named Tramachus is discovered on the slopes of Mount Lycabettus, apparently attacked by wolves. Diagoras, the boy's erastes and tutor at the Academy, enlists the help of a "Decipherer of Enigmas" (a detective named Heracles Pontor) to learn more about Tramachus's death. As Diagoras and Heracles investigate, more youths from the Academy are discovered brutally murdered. Their investigation takes them all over Athens, from mystery cult worship services to a symposium hosted by Plato.

Meanwhile, the translator (who is never named) provides frequent commentary on the work, particularly as he believes it to be an example of a (fictional) ancient literary device called eidesis. "Eidesis" is the practice of repeating words or phrases so as to evoke a particular image or idea in the reader's mind, as if it were a kind of literary steganography. As the translator works on the novel, he concludes that the eidetic secret concealed within the novel is The Twelve Labors of Heracles, one labor for each of the twelve chapters of the novel. The translator becomes obsessed with the imagery, going so far as to see himself depicted within the ancient work.

Partway through the novel, the translator is kidnapped and forced to continue the translation in a cell. His captor turns out to be the scholar Montalo, whose edition of The Athenian Murders is the only surviving copy of the work. Montalo himself had obsessed over the novel, hoping to find in it a proof of Plato's Theory of Forms. He felt that should an eidetic text, such as this novel, evoke the same ideas in each reader it would then prove that ideas have a separate, independent reality. However, Montalo finished the translation only to discover that the book proved the opposite—that the book proved his (and the translator's) reality did not exist. The translator finishes the work only to have the same realization: that they themselves are characters in The Athenian Murders, which was written by a colleague of Plato named Philotextus as a way to incorporate Plato's theory of knowledge while criticizing the philosophical lifestyle.

== Characters in The Athenian Murders ==
=== In the ancient novel ===
- Heracles Pontor – A "decipherer of enigmas" whose name and physicality bear a strong similarity to those of a later detective, Hercule Poirot.
- Tramachus – A young student at the Academy whose mutilated body is discovered on Mount Lycabettus.
- Itys – Tramachus's mother and childhood love-interest of Heracles Pontor.
- Diagoras – A tutor of philosophy at the Academy who enlists Heracles Pontor to solve the case.
- Yasintra – A hetaera working in Piraeus.
- Ponsica – Heracles Pontor's slave and worshipper of the Sacred Mysteries
- Euneos and Antisus – Classmates of Tramachus at the Academy.
- Crantor – An errant philosopher who rejects Plato's rationality.
- Menaechmus – A sculptor and tragedian in Athens.
- Plato – A highly regarded philosopher at the Academy.

=== In the footnotes ===
- The translator – An unnamed character who is only known through his footnotes to the translation of The Athenian Murders.
- Helena – A colleague of the translator who correctly identifies the first eidetic message.
- Montalo – The scholar who first compiled and annotated the papyri on which The Athenian Murders is told.

== Platonic references ==
The novel extensively references Platonic idealism, the philosophical concept that postulates the independent existence of Ideas. According to Plato, the realm of Ideas is the only true reality; our world is made up of imperfect, ephemeral imitations of the true ideas. The epilogue penned by Philotextus references Plato's allegory of the cave when states that he believes philosophers are the ones inside the cave, oblivious to the real (that is, material) world all around them.

The work also calls upon Plato's Republic: the future world envisioned by Philotextus in which Montalo and the translator dwell is the ideal society postulated by Plato. In it, men and women are completely equal, violence has been eradicated, and the best of people rule the cities.

The ancient novel features a number of locations significant to ancient Greek philosophy. Diagoras and Heracles often walk in the Poikile Stoa, the birthplace of Stoicism. The duo also attend a Platonic symposium at the Academy of Plato.

== See also ==
- Fiction set in Ancient Greece
- Pale Fire by Vladimir Nabokov
