= The Bull from the Sea =

1962 novel by Mary Renault

- First edition (UK)
- Author: Mary Renault
- Language: English
- Genre: Historical novel
- Publisher: Longmans (UK); Pantheon Books (US)
- Publication date: 1962
- Publication place: United Kingdom
- Media type: Print (hardback & paperback)
- Pages: viii + 280 (First edition)
- ISBN: 0-375-72680-2 (Vintage paperback edition)
- OCLC: 47771741
- Dewey Decimal: 823/0912 21
- LC Class: PR6035.E55 B85 2001
- Preceded by: The King Must Die

The Bull from the Sea is a novel written by Mary Renault, first published in 1962. It is the sequel to The King Must Die and continues the story of the mythological hero Theseus after his return from Crete.

== Plot introduction ==
The story is a retelling of the life of mythological hero Theseus after his return from the Minoan palace of Knossos. The novel follows his later quests, his friendship with Pirithoos, and his liaison with Hippolyta and marriage to Phaedra.

== Plot summary ==
Theseus returns to Athens along with the other Athenian bull-leapers. His father, Aegeus, has killed himself, which leaves the kingdom to the young Theseus. He soon meets Pirithoos, the rebellious pirate king of the Lapiths, and the two go on several adventures.

Following the events described in The King Must Die, Theseus leads a Hellenic expedition to conquer Minoan Crete, fallen into anarchy after the great earthquake. He chooses to govern the island through a puppet ruler from the old royal house.

Pirithoos subsequently talks Theseus out of returning to Knossos to meet his bride-to-be, Phaedra, and instead the two journey to Euxine, home of the Amazons. There, Theseus falls in love with Hippolyta the leader of the Amazons, and after defeating her in single combat, takes her home to Athens with him. She is beautiful, athletic, and honourable, sharing the same physical fearlessness and pride in 'kingship' that Theseus has. Hippolyta becomes closer and more important to Theseus than has any other woman or person in his life. Hippolyta bears Theseus a son, Hippolytus, and continues to fight and hunt alongside him.

The people of Athens generally fail to understand the equal and reciprocal relationship that Theseus has with Hippolyta because they see her as a foreign barbarian who does not adopt the traditional female role and because they fear the return of Goddess worship. Theseus, doing what is strategically best for his kingdom, eventually and reluctantly decides to marry the Cretan princess Phaedra. Hippolyta advises him to make this marriage, regarding him as her king as well as her partner and lover. Phaedra bears him a son, Akamas, but continues living in Crete.

When the Scythians (allied with the Amazons) attack Athens with massive and almost overwhelming forces, Hippolyta helps defend the Acropolis. At the climax of the battle, Theseus hears the call of the god to give his life for his people and he goes willingly to the sacrifice, fighting at the front of his army without his shield with the thought that the tide will be turned and his people saved. However, at the last moment, Hippolyta unexpectedly leaps in front of Theseus, taking the arrow meant for him. She dies in his arms.

Theseus, enraged, goes on to win the battle for his people but his life is spared. However, in addition to losing the greatest love of his life, he has also lost some of the divine inspiration that previously guided him to be the best king that he could be, feeling that he was called to make the sacrifice but that Hippolyta took that from him. "The King had been called and the King had died". He reflects on the irony of the fact that Hippolyta, notwithstanding her understanding of the king's duty to sacrifice himself for his people, at the end chose to save him due to her love for him as a man rather than her duty to him as king.

Years pass. Hippolytos, the son of Theseus and Hippolyta, has grown into a tall, handsome young man with a kingly presence, quiet and serious disposition, and an interest in medicine. Theseus is disappointed to learn, however, that Hippolytus has taken a vow of chastity as part of his devotion to the god of medicine and that he is not interested in being the heir of Theseus to the throne of Athens. Theseus therefore reluctantly decides that his less kingly son by Phaedra, Akamas, should come to Athens to begin to learn how to be king.

Theseus is not eager to include Phaedra, who is living in Crete, but decides that he might dishonour her if he did not invite her to Athens. She meets Hippolytus and develops a strong passion for him unknown to Theseus. Phaedra's ultimate goal is later revealed to be a plan to convince Hippolytus to kill Theseus, marry her, and restore the Goddess worship, though it is unclear when and how much of this is shared with Hippolytus. Hippolytus is horrified by Phaedra's overtures and attempts to avoid her at all costs, but, since she confided in him as a doctor, he feels that he cannot betray her thoughts to his father. Hippolytus makes repeated efforts to escape her presence but Phaedra persuades Theseus on several occasions that she needs to see Hippolytus for medical reasons. Theseus remains completely oblivious to what is going on.

After Hippolytus rejects her yet again, Phaedra falsely accuses Hippolytus of rape. Bound by his oath, Hippolytus feels he cannot defend himself. Theseus, taken by surprise by these revelations and suffering from the onset of his earthquake warning sickness, exiles his son and curses him, telling him that he will soon feel Poseidon's wrath. Hippolytus flees. Phaedra's son, Akamas, despite his choking sickness, uses all of his strength to get to Theseus and tell him the truth. Theseus realises his error and races his chariot after Hippolytus in an effort to reach him, further recognising that his son is the only person he did not warn with respect to the earthquake. However, he is too late: a tsunami, caused by the earthquake, smashes Hippolytus and his chariot; near his son is a bull caught in the tsunami, the "bull from the sea" that Theseus had long ago been warned not to loose. Theseus reaches his son shortly before he dies and shares a few last words.

Theseus then returns to confront his wife regarding her lies; he kills her in revenge for the death of his son. Realising that he should have made her publicly admit her guilt and clear his son's name, he then writes a suicide note in her handwriting in which she confesses to her crime.

In the remainder of the book an ageing Theseus confronts his mortality and loss. The deaths of Hippolyta and his son have diminished his sense of purpose. On another expedition, he suffers a stroke. His men are loyal to him and he is well cared for as he attempts to recover on an unknown island. To avoid giving an opportunity to his enemies, Theseus has his men bring a tale to Athens that he has gone down into the earth to be purified and that he will eventually return to destroy the enemies of Athens. This story later becomes the source of the legend that Theseus visited the underworld.

During his long, slow, and partial recovery, Theseus ruminates on his past actions, wondering how life might have been different if he had not gone roving and met Hippolyta or if his son had not been accused while Theseus was suffering from the earthquake sickness. An earthquake occurs which Theseus did not anticipate and by that sign he believes that the god Poseidon has truly forsaken him as a punishment for cursing his son instead of warning him. However, he seems to conclude that fate and character are intertwined and that one cannot avoid one's destiny. Eventually, he heals enough to return to Athens where he learns that Menestheus in power during his absence, has ruined many of his achievements, allowing his kingdom to be broken into pieces and into disarray. Despairing, he leaves Athens believing that his legacy has been ruined.

While visiting the king of Skyros, Lykomedes, he sees the young Achilles, who has been hidden on the island to avoid his mother's prophecy that he would die in battle. Theseus considers trying to warn Achilles of his fate, but decides that Achilles would not listen to him and that a man cannot outrun his fate. That night Theseus dreams that he will fight alongside his people against the Persians at the future Battle of Marathon, saving them again and knowing that his name will continue to be revered and honoured by his people. Having received some contentment from this vision and hearing yet again the "sea surge" sound again in his ears that tells him that the god has returned to him, he decides to jump from the cliff into the sea and so end his life, fulfilling the titular motif of sacrifice in The King Must Die.

== See also ==
- Fiction set in ancient Greece
