= Diane Purkiss =

British-Australian historian

- Born: 30 June 1961 (age 65); Sydney, New South Wales, Australia

Academic background
- Education: University of Queensland (BA); Merton College, Oxford (DPhil)

Diane Purkiss (born 30 June 1961) is an Australian historian, and Fellow and Tutor of English at Keble College, Oxford. She specialises in Renaissance and women's literature, witchcraft and the English Civil War.

Purkiss was born in Sydney, New South Wales, and was educated at Roseville College, Our Lady of the Rosary Convent, and Stuartholme School. She received a BA with first class Honours from the University of Queensland and D.Phil. from Merton College, Oxford. She became a lecturer in English at the University of East Anglia in 1991, and lecturer in English at the University of Reading in 1993. In 1998, she became a Professor of English at Exeter University, before taking up her current post at Keble College in 2000.

== Publications ==
As author:

- The Witch in History: Early Modern and Late Twentieth Century Representations (Routledge, 1996)
- Troublesome Things: a history of fairies and fairy stories (Allen Lane, 2000)
- Literature, Gender, and Politics during the English Civil War (Cambridge University Press, 2005)
- The English Civil War: A People's History (HarperCollins, 2006).
- English Food: A People's History (HarperCollins, 2022).

As editor:

- Women, Texts and Histories 1575-1760 (Routledge, 1992), with Clare Brant
- Renaissance Women: Elizabeth Cary's Tragedie of Mariam and Edward II and Aemilia Lanyer's Salve Deus Rex Judaorum (William Pickering, 1994)
- Three Tragedies by Renaissance Women, an edition of Iphigeneia at Aulis, by Lady Jane Lumley, The Tragedie of Antonie, by Lady Mary Sidney, The Tragedy of Mariam, by Elizabeth Cary, Viscountess Falkland (Penguin, 1998)

Purkiss also wrote children's books with her daughter, Alice Druitt, under the pseudonym Tobias Druitt.
