= Owls to Athens =

2004 novel by H.N. Turteltaub

- First edition
- Author: Harry Turtledove
- Language: English
- Series: Hellenic Traders
- Genre: Historical novel
- Publisher: Forge Books (Tor)
- Publication date: 2004
- Publication place: United States
- Media type: Print
- Pages: 382
- ISBN: 0-7653-0038-9
- OCLC: 55625156
- Dewey Decimal: 813/.54 22
- LC Class: PS3570.U758 O95 2004
- Preceded by: The Sacred Land
- Followed by: Salamis

Owls to Athens is a historical novel written by H.N. Turteltaub (a pseudonym of Harry Turtledove). It was first published in hardcover by Forge Books in December 2004. The book was reissued under the author's real name as a trade paperback and ebook by Phoenix Pick in March 2015. It is the fourth book of the so-called "Hellenic Traders" series of historical novels.

== Plot ==
The book features the continuing adventures of a pair of Greek traders from Rhodes. Sostratos and Menedemos arrive in Athens in time for the Greater Dionysia festival. Scholarly Sostratos spends much of his time visiting with his old philosophy teachers and seeing plays like Menandros' Kolax ("The Flatterer"). His cousin Menedemos, out for sexual adventures as usual, courts disaster by seducing Xenokleia, the wife of their host Protmakhos and an important woman in her own right.

== Title ==
"Taking owls to Athens" was a contemporary Greek saying, roughly the equivalent of the modern "selling snow to eskimos" or "carrying coals to Newcastle". The saying referred to the owl depicted on Athenian silver drachmas, Attica being home to large silver mines.

== Setting ==
The setting is Athens in 307 BC, sixteen years after the death of Alexander the Great. As in the other books in the series, persons and places are frequently given their original Greek names (Sokrates, Platon, etc.) rather than the Latin-derived ones common in English.

== Reception ==
Kirkus Reviews calls the book "the usual Frick-and-Frack routine, worldly Menedemos or cerebral Sostratos alternately falling into some trap and having to be rescued by his cousin--who promptly falls into another mess himself. Quick and fun for newcomers, though fans may wonder whether the series is running out of steam."
