= The Oxford Murders (novel) =

2003 novel by Guillermo Martínez

- English language cover
- Author: Guillermo Martínez
- Original title: Crímenes imperceptibles
- Translator: Sonia Soto
- Language: Spanish
- Genre: Thriller, Crime fiction
- Publisher: MacAdam/Cage
- Publication date: 2003
- Publication place: Argentina
- English publication date: October 16, 2005
- Media type: Print (Hardback & Paperback)
- Pages: 208 pp. (paperback)
- ISBN: 978-0143037965

The Oxford Murders (Spanish: Crímenes imperceptibles; Imperceptible Crimes) is a novel by the Argentine author Guillermo Martínez, first published in 2003. It was translated into English in 2005 by Sonia Soto. The story tells about a professor of logic, who, along with a graduate student, investigates a series of bizarre, mathematically-based murders in Oxford, England.

== Plot introduction ==
In this thriller, mathematical symbols are the key to a mysterious sequence of murders. Each new death that occurs is accompanied by a different mathematical shape, starting with a circle. This pure mathematical form heralds the death of Mrs Eagleton, the landlady of a young Argentine mathematician who narrates the story. It appears that the serial killer can be stopped only if somebody can decode the next symbol in the sequence. The mathematics graduate is joined by the leading Oxford logician Arthur Seldom on the quest to solve the cryptic clues. The book explains how difficult it can be to solve mathematics in a cryptic form.

== Selected editions ==
- Abacus (2005). ISBN 0-349-11721-7. Paperback, English.
- MacAdam/Cage Publishing (2005). ISBN 1-59692-150-1. Hardback, English.

== See also ==
- The Oxford Murders, a 2007 film adaptation directed by Álex de la Iglesia, starring Elijah Wood and John Hurt.
- The Mathematical Institute
- Merton College, Oxford
- Cryptography
