= The Oxford Murders (film) =

2008 film by Álex de la Iglesia

- US theatrical release poster
- Directed by: Álex de la Iglesia
- Screenplay by: Jorge Guerricaechevarria; Álex de la Iglesia
- Based on: The Oxford Murders by Guillermo Martínez
- Produced by: Gerardo Herrero; Álvaro Augustin; Mariela Besuievsky
- Starring: Elijah Wood; John Hurt; Leonor Watling; Julie Cox
- Cinematography: Kiko de la Rica
- Edited by: Alejandro Lázaro
- Music by: Roque Baños
- Production companies: Telecinco Cinema; Tornasol Films; La Fabrique 2
- Distributed by: Warner Bros. Pictures España (Spain); Odeon Sky Filmworks (United Kingdom); La Fabrique de Films (France)
- Release dates: January 17, 2008 (Madrid); January 18, 2008 (Spain); March 26, 2008 (France); April 25, 2008 (United Kingdom)
- Running time: 108 minutes
- Countries: Spain; United Kingdom; France
- Language: English
- Budget: $14.1 million

The Oxford Murders is a 2008 thriller drama film co-written and directed by Álex de la Iglesia and starring Elijah Wood, John Hurt, Leonor Watling and Julie Cox. It is based on 2003's novel of the same name by Argentine mathematician and writer Guillermo Martínez.

== Plot ==
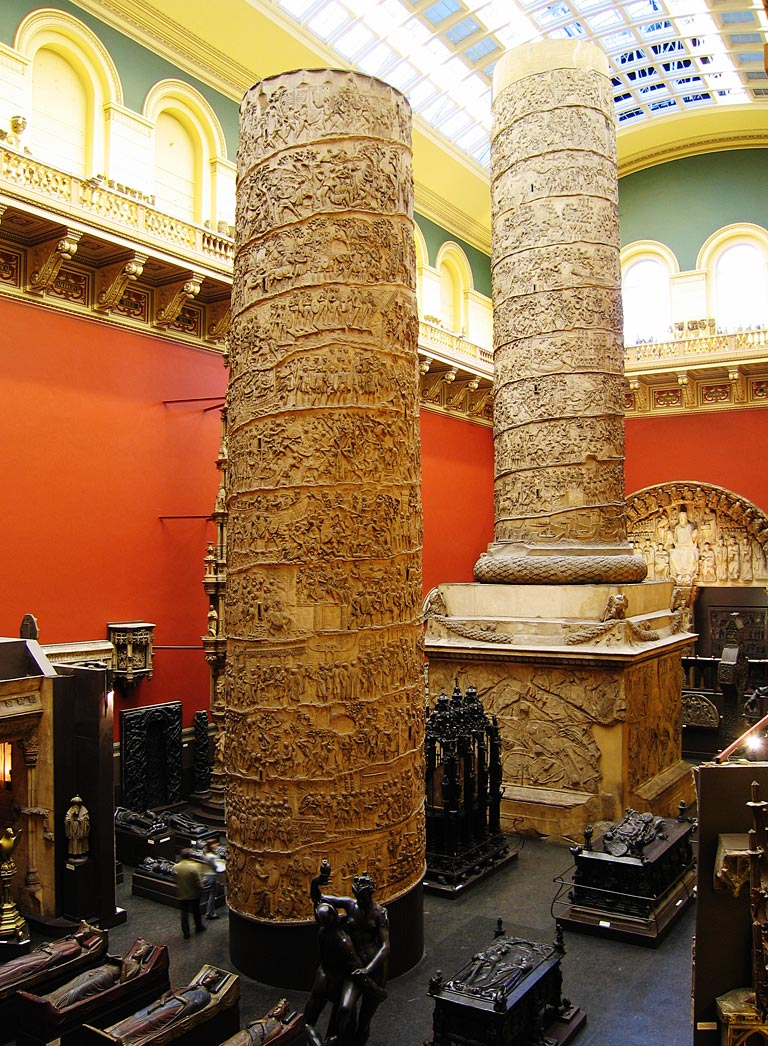
The plaster cast of Trajan's Column at the Victoria and Albert Museum is discussed in the film.

In 1993, Martin (Elijah Wood), a US student at the University of Oxford, wants Arthur Seldom (John Hurt) as his thesis supervisor. He idolises Seldom and has learned all about him. He takes accommodation in Oxford at the house of Mrs. Eagleton (Anna Massey), an old friend of Seldom. Also in the house is her daughter, Beth (Julie Cox), who is her full-time caregiver – which she resents bitterly – and a musician by occupation.

In a public lecture, Seldom quotes Wittgenstein's Tractatus to deny the possibility of absolute truth. Hoping to impress his idol, Martin disputes this, asserting his faith in the absolute truth of mathematics: "I believe in the number pi". Seldom humiliates him, ridiculing his arguments and making him look foolish in front of the audience. Disillusioned, Martin decides to abandon his studies and goes to his office to collect his belongings. There, he encounters his office-mate, a bitter mathematician Podorov (Burn Gorman), who also failed to become a student of Seldom's.

Martin then returns to his residence, where he finds Seldom arriving to visit Mrs. Eagleton. The two men enter the house together and find Martin's landlady murdered. Seldom tells the police that he had received a note with his friend's address marked as "the first of a series". As Seldom is an authority on logical series, he argues that a serial killer is using murder as a way to challenge his intelligence. According to Seldom, "The only perfect crime that exists is not the one that remains unsolved, but the one which is solved with the wrong culprit."

Martin and Seldom discuss how easily the murder of the old lady might have been overlooked, particularly as she already suffered from terminal cancer. Martin suggests that the murderer is committing "imperceptible murders", meaning that the killer is choosing victims who are already dying therefore meaning that the police would be less likely to suspect foul play.

Martin goes to the hospital where his girlfriend Lorna (Leonor Watling) works. There he meets a religious fanatic (Dominique Pinon), who has a daughter in dire need of a lung transplant. He also runs into Seldom, who is visiting Kalman (Alex Cox), a former student who went mad and suffers from a debilitating cancer, with bone involvement. Soon after, the patient who shares the room with Seldom's friend dies of an apparent lethal injection and the authorities receive a second symbol: two interlocking arcs.

Martin and Lorna's relationship becomes strained as he becomes more obsessed with Seldom and the murders and discovers that Lorna had once been Seldom's lover. At a Guy Fawkes Night concert, Martin sees Podorov acting suspiciously and the police give chase, only to discover that Podorov had merely intended to hang an insulting banner from the school roof. While they are distracted a member of the orchestra collapses and dies from respiratory failure. A drawing of a triangle is found on his music stand. Afterwards, Seldom tells Martin a story about a nineteenth century man who had written a diary listing ways to kill his wife. When the wife discovered the diary, she killed her husband but was acquitted by a jury on grounds of self-defence. Decades later, the diary was discovered to have been forged by the woman's lover. Seldom uses this story to explain that the perfect crime is not one which is never solved, but one which is solved incorrectly.

All of Oxford's mathematics community is excited as a local researcher claims to have solved Fermat's Last Theorem. The mathematicians, including Seldom and Martin, board a bus to travel to the conference, but Martin jumps out after seeing Lorna passing on the street. The two reconcile and agree to take a long holiday away from Oxford, mathematics, and Seldom. After making love with Lorna, Martin realises that the sequence the killer has sent them all consist of Pythagorean symbols and that the fourth one will be a tetractys, consisting of ten points.

The police, thinking that the killer is obsessed with Seldom, believe that he means to target the bus which Seldom and the other mathematicians are travelling in. However, the killer, as Martin realises, is actually the man he had met at the hospital. The man is a bus driver for a school for developmentally challenged children. Seeing the students as unfit to live and wanting to provide organ donors to save his own daughter's life, he blows up the bus, killing the children and himself. Afterwards, the police theorise that he had planned to escape the blast alive and had committed the other murders to present the deaths of the schoolchildren as the work of a serial murderer, thus shifting any blame from himself.

Afterwards, Lorna and Martin prepare to leave Oxford. However, Martin realises that Seldom has been lying to him the entire time. As Lorna leaves in disgust, Martin travels to meet Seldom. He explains what he has worked out.

Beth, wanting to be relieved of the responsibility of caring for her mother, had murdered the old woman as the police had initially suspected. In a panic, she had called Seldom, who came over to help cover up the crime. But Seldom arrived just as Martin did and so could not clean up the crime scene. Instead, he invented the story about receiving a note from the killer to direct suspicion away from Beth. The man at the hospital had died of natural causes with Seldom merely creating a false injection mark and leaving a symbol behind. The death of the musician at the concert was a fortuitous accident which Seldom took advantage of.

Seldom argues that while he did indeed lie, his actions resulted in no deaths. However, Martin points out that the bus bomber took his inspiration from Seldom's string of murders. Seldom counters that all actions have consequences, some unintentional, and that one of Martin's casual remarks to Beth had led to her murdering her mother.

== Mathematical and philosophical references ==
The characters debate several mathematical, physical and philosophical concepts such as logical series, Wittgenstein's rule-following paradox, Heisenberg's Principle of Uncertainty, Gödel's Theorem, circles, the Vesica Piscis, the possibility of perfect crime, Fermat's Last Theorem and its proof by Professor Wiles, the Taniyama conjecture, the tetraktys and the Pythagoreans. There are references, also, to the Butterfly effect.

== Artistic license ==
"Logic series" is not actually an established topic in mathematical logic or mathematics. Contrary to what Seldom states in his lecture at the beginning of the film, the argument of Wittgenstein's Tractatus does not actually proceed by the use of equations (with the exception of a few simple equations in Wittgenstein's introduction of the truth tables) and it is not expressed in the formal language of mathematical logic; the argument is rather a philosophical argument expressed in normal, albeit idiosyncratic, language.

Moreover, Professor Andrew Wiles, who solved Fermat's Last Theorem, is represented as "Professor Wilkin" of Cambridge University in the film, and Fermat's Last Theorem is represented as "Bormat's Last Theorem".

Contrary to a statement made early in the film, electromechanical computers (namely the "Bombe") played a crucial role in the breaking of the German "Enigma" cipher by British (and earlier, Polish) cryptographers during WW2.

== Cast ==
- Elijah Wood as Martin, a US student
- John Hurt as Arthur Seldom, a British authority on logical series
- Leonor Watling as Lorna, a Spanish nurse
- Julie Cox as Beth Eagleton, a musician, daughter of Mrs. Eagleton
- Dominique Pinon as Frank, father of an ill girl waiting for an organ transplant
- Burn Gorman as Yuri Ivanovich Podorov, a crank mathematician
- Jim Carter as Inspector Petersen
- Danny Sapani as Scott
- Anna Massey as Mrs. Julia Eagleton, Martin's landlady and Seldom's friend
- Alex Cox as Kalman, a demented mathematician with terminal cancer

== Production ==
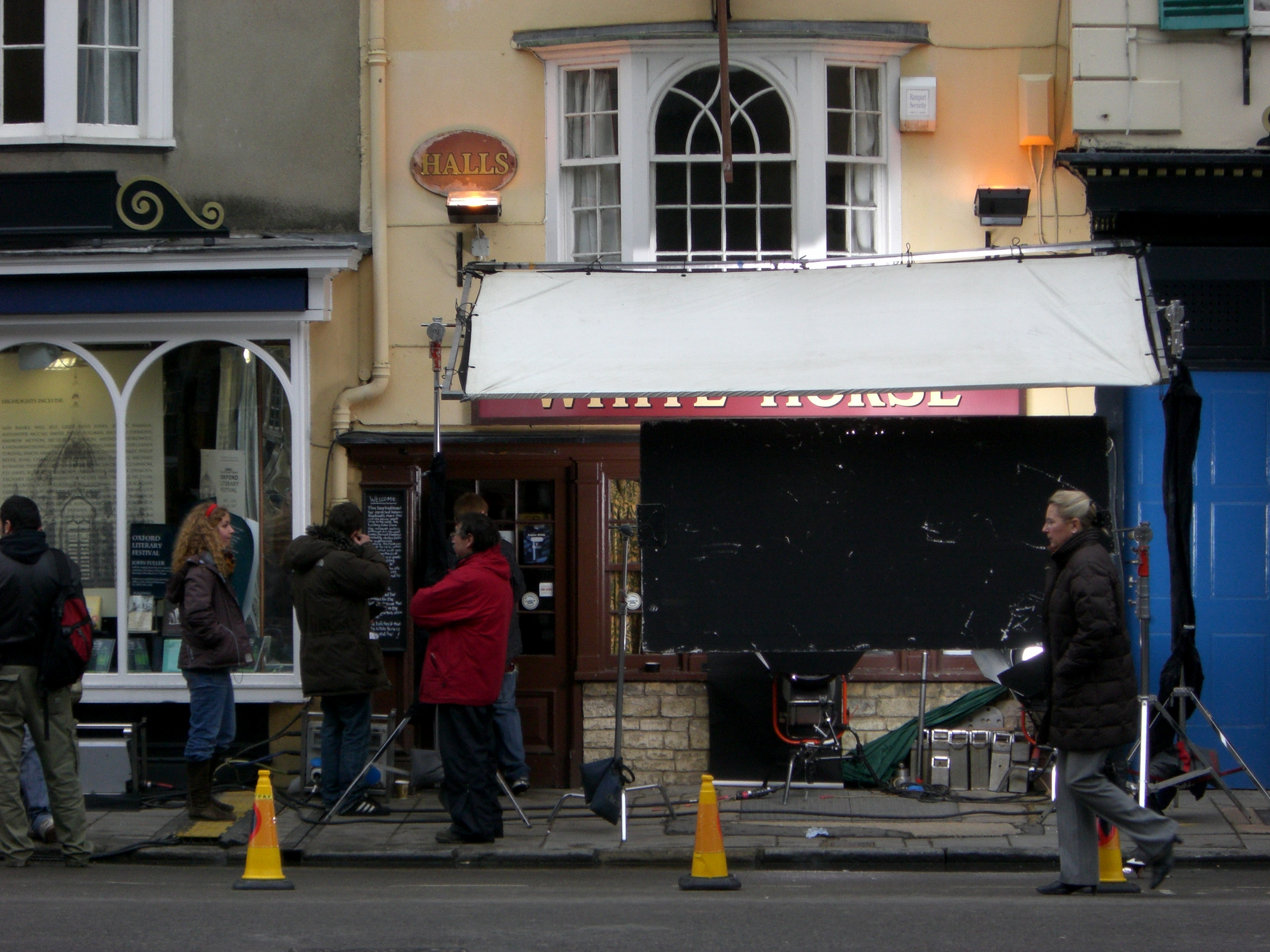
Filming at the White Horse pub, Oxford, 22 March 2007.

The film is a Spanish-British-French production directed by Spanish Álex de la Iglesia. Before the confirmation of Elijah Wood in the film, Mexican actor Gael García Bernal had been considered for the role of the mathematics student. There were some weeks of speculation on who would play the lead. On 26 December 2006, Tornasol Films announced that Wood was cast in the lead role. De la Iglesia commented that he convinced Wood to accept the role for the script. De la Iglesia also praised Wood: "I'm delighted to work with Elijah, who undoubtedly has the most powerful eyes in the industry and who is perfect for the part".

British actor John Hurt was cast in the role of a professor of the university, who helps the young student in his quest to try to stop a series of murders. Actor Michael Caine had been considered for this role.

De la Iglesia described daily in his blog the peculiar situations that happened during the production of the film. The film is his first foray outside his typical black comedy genre into more dramatic fare.

Filming began on 22 January 2007 and finished on 24 March, with locations in Oxford and the Cast Courts of the Victoria and Albert Museum of London.

== Release ==
The film was picked up for UK release by Odeon Sky Filmworks, opening on 25 April 2008, and had a DVD release in the UK on 1 September 2008. However in the US, it was not picked up for release until 2010, with VOD set for 2 July 2010 and also theatres on 6 August 2010, distributed by Magnolia Pictures.

The DVD and Blu-ray Disc versions of the film were released on 5 October 2010.

== Reception ==
The Oxford Murders received mostly negative reviews. David Lewis, a critic for the San Francisco Chronicle, wrote that despite the fact that "there were plenty of talented people involved", the film had a "clunky script" and was "just plain boring, from beginning to end". Jonathan Holland from Variety was less critical, calling the film a "polished but verbose whodunit", though he found fault with the dialogue and the romantic subplot. The review aggregator Rotten Tomatoes gives the film a rating of 17%. Geoffrey Pullum, a professor of linguistics, wrote a scathing review.

== See also ==
- List of films about mathematicians
