= The Gryphon's Skull =

2002 novel by H.N. Turteltaub

- First edition
- Author: H. N. Turteltaub
- Cover artist: Richard B. Farrell
- Language: English
- Series: Hellenic Traders
- Genre: Historical novel
- Publisher: Tor Books
- Publication date: 2002
- Publication place: United States
- Media type: Print (Hardcover & Paperback)
- Pages: 384
- ISBN: 0-312-87222-4
- OCLC: 52079813
- Dewey Decimal: 813/.54 21
- LC Class: PS3570.U758 G79 2002
- Preceded by: Over the Wine Dark Sea
- Followed by: The Sacred Land

The Gryphon's Skull is a historical fiction novel written by H.N. Turteltaub (a pseudonym of Harry Turtledove). It was first published in hardcover by Tor Books in December 2002, and in paperback by the same publisher in December 2003. The book was reissued under the author's real name as an ebook by Phoenix Pick in March 2014, and as a trade paperback by the same publisher in April of the same year. It is the second book in the Hellenic Traders series.

== Plot summary ==
The book follows the adventures of Menedemos and his cousin, Sostratos, seafaring traders from Rhodes in the eastern Mediterranean in the years after Alexander the Great. The plot centers around their commercial voyages across the Aegean Sea in their ship the Aphrodite during the year 309 BC. Early on, Sostratos acquires what appears to be the skull of a mythical gryphon (in reality the fossilized skull of a Protoceratops dinosaur), which he hopes to transport to scholars in Athens for study. Various other responsibilities and events get in the way, notably a commission from Ptolemaîos, satrap of Egypt, to spirit Polemaîos, disaffected nephew of Antigonos, master of Asia, from Chalcis to Cos to join him in his campaign against Antigonos. The cousins succeed in their mission, though Polemaîos later betrays Ptolemaîos, and is ordered to drink hemlock. Sostratos witnesses the enforced suicide. The gryphon's skull is later lost in a pirate attack on the Aphrodite.

== Reception ==
Publishers Weekly notes that "[i]n the end, readers [of the book] will count themselves satisfied with the journey." The reviewer points out that "[t]The author has spelled names as the Greeks did—Kyklades, Thoukydides, Skythians—and this adds to the fun."

Kirkus Reviews calls the novel "[s]uperlative historical adventure, narrated with plenty of action and a good feel for the era." The two protagonists are characterized as "a somewhat Patty Duke-ish pair of cousins" who "make a good pair, each complementing the other's weaknesses and strengths."

Michele Leber in Booklist characterizes the book as "factually-laded historical fiction, although history is sometimes dispensed awkwardly through dialog rather than through narrative; and while a table of weights, measures, and money is provided, a glossary is sorely missing. But there is appealing camaraderie between the cousins, and no lack of action; and plans for a future voyage, plus unresolved issues, pave the way for more to come."

The book was also reviewed by K. V. Bailey in Vector 227, January 2003, and Peter Heck (2003) in Asimov's Science Fiction, May 2003.
