= Corydon and the Island of Monsters =

2005 novel by Tobias Druitt

First edition (UK)

Corydon and the Island of Monsters is the first instalment of the Corydon Trilogy, penned by Tobias Druitt; a pseudonym for a mother-son writing combination. It was published in the United Kingdom by Simon & Schuster in 2005, and in the United States by A. A. Knopf in 2006, and distributed by Random House. According to WorldCat, almost 500 libraries have copies of the book. It appears on numerous library and school reading lists.

Corydon and the Island of Monsters has been translated into Czech as Corydon a ostrov příšer (Millennium Publishing, 2008) and into French as Corydon et l'île aux monstres (Tourbillon, 2009).

== Plot summary ==
The book draws on classical Greek mythology and follows Corydon, an outcast boy, neglected because of his goat foot.

== Reception ==
Kirkus Reviews found that "Reading this witty, profoundly sapient take on the old tales will leave readers impatient for the sequels." Common Sense Media called it "a good introduction to some famous stories, and it can be a treat for parents, too." but stated that "The pacing is erratic, as is the tone .... Even more annoying are references to events that haven't happened yet." yet "the story is surprisingly moving, especially a mother-son relationship."
