= Over the Wine Dark Sea =

2001 novel by H.N. Turteltaub

- Author: H. N. Turteltaub
- Language: English
- Series: Hellenic Traders
- Genre: Historical novel
- Publisher: Forge Books (Tor)
- Publication date: November 2001
- Publication place: United States
- Media type: Print (Hardcover & Paperback)
- Pages: 384 pp (first edition, hardback)
- ISBN: 0-312-87660-2 (first edition, hardback)
- OCLC: 45888895
- Dewey Decimal: 813/.54 21
- LC Class: PS3570.U758 O94 2001
- Followed by: The Gryphon's Skull

Over the Wine Dark Sea is a historical novel by H.N. Turteltaub (a pseudonym of Harry Turtledove), first published in hardcover by Forge Books in November 2001, and in paperback by Tor Books in November 2002. The book was reissued under the author's real name as a trade paperback and ebook by Phoenix Pick in November 2013. It is the first book of the so-called "Hellenic Traders" series of historical novels.

== Plot summary ==
The action of the book takes place in 310 BC, 13 years after the death of Alexander the Great. It features a pair of Greek cousins from Rhodes, Menedemos and Sostratos, who work as sea-going traders specializing in luxury goods. The plot centers on the cousins voyaging around the Greek parts of the Mediterranean Sea. They trade a great many things on their ship, the Aphrodite, including, much to the chagrin of many on board, peacocks. During their voyage they encounter pirates, other traders and get caught up in conflicts between some of Alexander's former generals, including Antigonos.

== Cultural references ==
The book contains several references to Classical Greek culture, including The Odyssey, The Iliad (both based on the author's own translations), Aristophanes, Sophocles, Socrates, and Plato. For example, the eponymous "wine-dark sea" is a standard Homeric epithet, routinely used as a reference to the sea in both epics.

== Reception ==
The book was reviewed by K. V. Bailey in Vector 218, July 2001.
