= Last of the Amazons =

2002 novel by Steven Pressfield

- Author: Steven Pressfield
- Language: English
- Subject: Theseus and the Amazons
- Genre: Historical fiction, Military fiction
- Publisher: Doubleday
- Publication date: May 14, 2002
- Publication place: United States
- Media type: Print
- Pages: 416
- ISBN: 978-0-385-50098-2

Last of the Amazons is a 2002 novel by Steven Pressfield that recounts the legend of Theseus and the Amazons, set before the threshold of recorded history, a generation before the Trojan War. The novel's theme is the conflict between the nascent Greek civilization and the savage but free Amazons of the Eastern steppes, between men and women, and between love and hate.

The novel covers Theseus's travels to the lands of the Amazons, his elopement with their war queen Antiope, and the war pursued by the Amazons to recover their queen and honor, which leads them to the walls of Athens and to eventual oblivion as a people. Most of the story is told through a series of interlocked flashbacks and recollections by an Athenian girl, Bones; her governess, the captive Amazon Selene; and Bones's uncle Damon, Selene's lover.

In 2002, the year of its publication, the novel was optioned for adaptation as a feature film by James Cameron, but nothing eventually came of it.
