= Terence Hawkins =

American novelist

- Born: 1956 (age 69–70); Uniontown, Pennsylvania, U.S.
- Citizenship: US
- Education: Yale University (BA); University of Wisconsin (JD)
- Occupations: Writer; editor; teacher
- Criminal charge: Larceny in the First Degree
- Criminal penalty: Ten years in prison, suspended after two years served, and five years of probation
- Criminal status: Released
- Spouse: Sharon Witt
- Writing career
- Language: English
- Genres: Fiction, essay
- Notable works: The Rage of Achilles; American Neolithic
- Website: www.terence-hawkins.com

Terence Hawkins (born 1956) is an American author of numerous short stories and two novels, American Neolithic, published by C&R Press, and The Rage of Achilles, a recounting of the Iliad in the form of a novel. In 2016, Hawkins pleaded guilty to one count of larceny for embezzling almost half a million dollars that had belonged to the clients of his law office. He has since been released from prison.

== Background ==
Terence Hawkins was born in 1956 in Uniontown, Pennsylvania, where many of his family were coal miners. He received his B.A. degree in history from Yale University, where he was publisher of the Yale Daily News, and later received a J.D. degree from the University of Wisconsin. He returned to New Haven, Connecticut, in 1985, where he practiced as a trial lawyer specializing in medical malpractice.

In 2011, Hawkins proposed that Yale host a summer writing program. In 2012, he became the founding director of the Yale Writers' Conference. Under his leadership, it rapidly grew to include three hundred students from every continent but Antarctica. Its faculty have included Colum McCann, Tom Perrotta, Colm Toibin, Julia Glass, and Nicholson Baker.

In 2015, Hawkins started the Company of Writers, offering authors' services to writers at every level of their careers. He lives in Connecticut.

In 2016, Hawkins pleaded guilty to one count of larceny in the first degree for embezzling almost half a million dollars that had belonged to the clients of his law office. He was sentenced to ten years in prison, a sentence suspended after two years served, and five years of probation. He was required to make "best efforts" to pay $414,674 in restitution to the state’s Client Security Fund, which had reimbursed some of the clients whose funds were embezzled, and also to attend 100 hours of mandatory community service.

== Works ==
=== The Rage of Achilles ===
Hawkins's first novel, The Rage of Achilles, is a novelization of Homer's Iliad, told in modern and sometimes graphic language. Based on Julian Jaynes's hypothesis of the development of consciousness and the breakdown of bicameral mentality, it depicts the formation of the modern mind in the crucible of Bronze Age warfare. "The vast majority of the characters in 'The Rage of Achilles' are highly susceptible to bicameral hallucinations. When faced with pressing challenges or cognitive dissonance, the gods 'speak to them' and even manifest visually. In keeping with Jaynes’s theory, these hallucinations are produced by the non-dominant hemisphere and perceived by the dominant voices from within the mind, wrapped in the trappings of an outer pantheon. Against this backdrop of hallucination-fueled men, a few characters are deaf to the voices of the gods. The Trojan prince Paris and the Ithacan hero Odysseus both experience the world with modern minds. Odysseus especially provides the reader with a sympathetic consciousness through which to understand these violent men and their alien thoughts. He's forced to nod and go along with the bicameral humans in his midst, unable to come clean about the divine silence in his head. At the same time, every diplomatic or strategic idea that he shares with the Achaeans is attributed to the goddess Athena speaking through him."

It was published in 2009 by Casperian Books.

=== American Neolithic ===
In his second novel, American Neolithic, Hawkins moves from the Homeric past to a dystopian future. Set in a moving-target day after tomorrow, the United States has become a Police State Lite: Drones patrol the skies; the black-uniformed Homeland Police have exclusive jurisdiction over any matter touching on national security; the Patriot Amendments have rendered civil liberties nominal. Into this world comes the last literate member of the last surviving band of Neanderthals, only to be caught up in a hip-hop murder and a courtroom confrontation with scientific creationism, the state religion of what his cynical lawyer calls a "trailer park theocracy."

Kirkus Reviews named it a Best Book of 2014, calling it "a towering work of speculative fiction." Rain Taxi described it as "a special novel; thematically rich, it also provides all the pleasures of a hard-boiled thriller. The unique premise and lovingly crafted characters will stay with you long after you’ve closed the book."
