= Richard Purtill =

American novelist

Richard L. Purtill
- Born: March 13, 1931; Chicago, Illinois, U.S.
- Died: December 4, 2016 (aged 85)
- Occupations: Educator, author
- Writing career
- Genre: Fantasy
- Website: www.alivingdog.com/purtill/R._Purtill_Official_Site.html

Richard Purtill (March 13, 1931 – December 4, 2016) was an American philosopher and writer, and professor emeritus of Philosophy at Western Washington University, Bellingham, Washington, US. He was a writer of fantasy and science fiction, critical non-fiction on the same genres, and various works on religion and philosophy. He is best known for his novels of the "Kaphtu" universe. He wrote as both Richard Purtill and Richard L. Purtill, a variant form of his name. He was active in professional writing circles, being a member of the Science Fiction and Fantasy Writers of America, the Authors Guild and the National Writers Union.

His book J.R.R.Tolkien: Myth, Morality and Religion won the 1987 Mythopoeic Scholarship Award for Inklings Studies.

== Bibliography ==
=== Kaphtu Universe ===
The Kaphtu Trilogy

- The Golden Gryphon Feather (1979)
- The Stolen Goddess (1980)
- The Mirror of Helen (1983)

Lost Tales Of Kaphtu

- The Gryphon Seal (2005)
- The Eleusinian Gate (2006)
- Letter to Nausicaa (2008)

=== Other novels ===
- Murdercon (1982)
- The Parallel Man (1984)
- Enchantment At Delphi (1986)

=== Short stories ===
- "Others' Eyes" (1980)
- "By the Dragon's Cave" (1984)
- "Gorgonissa" (1985)
- "Something in the Blood" (as by Richard L. Purtill) (1986)
- "The Counterfeit Maiden" (1996)
- "Grey Wolf's Tale" (1999)
- "The Firebird's Feather, the King Horse, and Baba Yaga's Grandniece" (1999)

=== Non-fiction ===
- Logic for Philosophers (1971)
- Solutions to Odd-numbered Exercises to Accompany Logic for Philosophers (1971)
- Lord of the Elves and Eldils: Fantasy and Philosophy in C. S. Lewis and J. R. R. Tolkien (1974)
- Reason to Believe (1974)
- Philosophically Speaking (1975)
- Thinking About Ethics (1976)
- Thinking About Religion: A Philosophical Introduction to Religion (1978)
- Logic: Argument, Refutation, and Proof (1979)
- C S Lewis' Case for the Christian Faith (as by Richard L. Purtill) (1981, rev. 2004)
- J.R.R.Tolkien: Myth, Morality and Religion (1984)
- Philosophical Questions: An Introductory Anthology (1984) (with Peter Kreeft and Michael H. MacDonald) (1984)
- Moral Dilemmas (1985)
- A Logical Introduction to Philosophy (1988)
- Logical Thinking (1992)
