= Guillermo Martínez (writer) =

Argentine writer (born 1962)

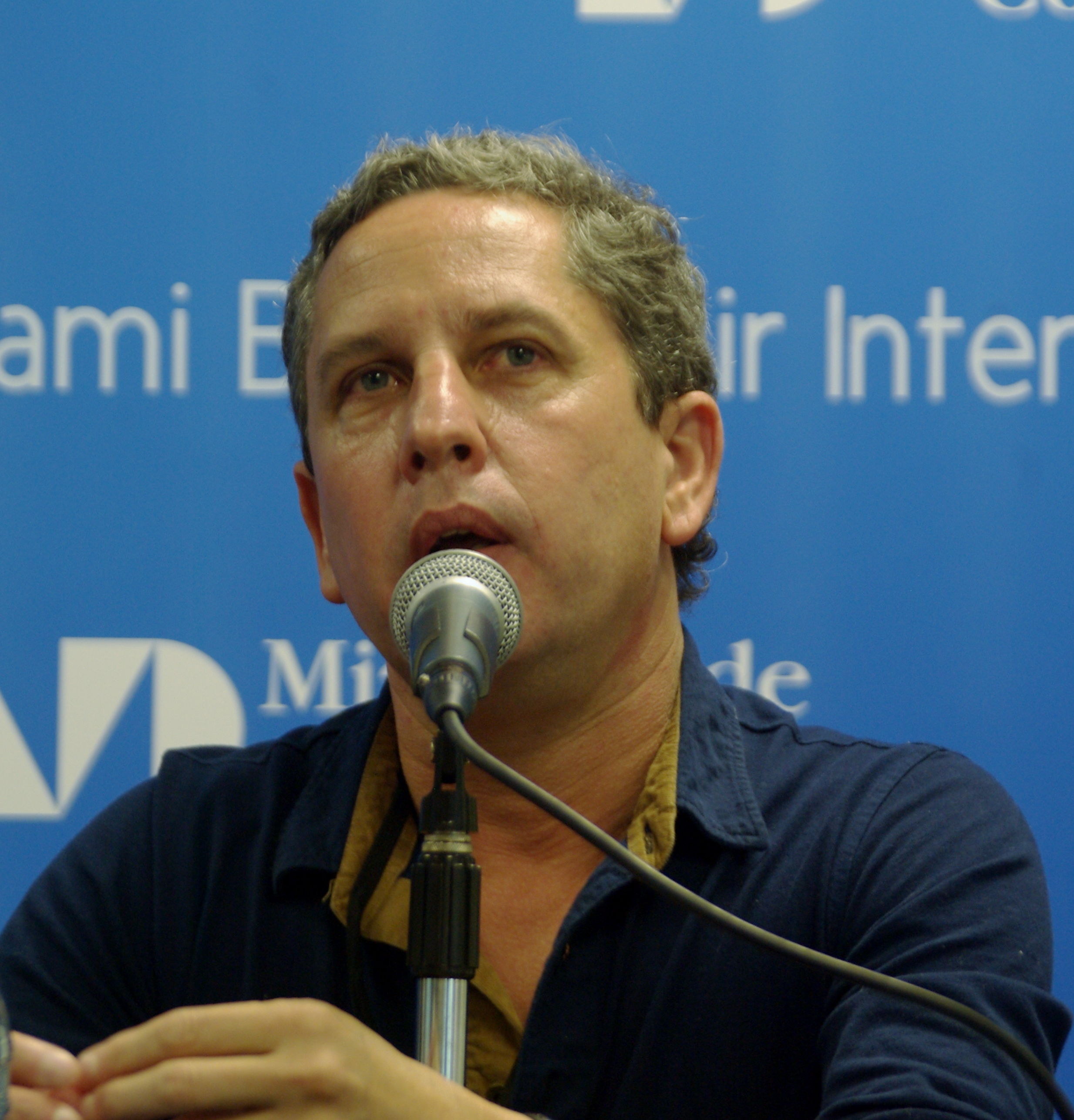
- Guillermo Martínez at the Miami Book Fair International in 2014
- Born: 29 July 1962 (age 64); Bahía Blanca, Argentina
- Education: University of Buenos Aires
- Occupations: Author; mathematician
- Writing career
- Genres: Crime fiction – novels and short stories
- Notable works: The Oxford Murders (2003); The Book of Murder (2007)
- Notable awards: Planeta Prize (2003)

Guillermo Martínez (born 29 July 1962) is an Argentine novelist and short story writer.

Martínez was born in Bahía Blanca, Argentina. He gained a PhD in mathematical logic at the University of Buenos Aires.

After his degree in Argentina, he worked for two years in a postdoctoral position at the Mathematical Institute, Oxford. His most successful novel has been Crímenes Imperceptibles (Imperceptible Crimes), known in English as The Oxford Murders, written in 2003. In the same year, he was awarded the Planeta Prize for this novel, which has been translated into a number of languages. The book has appeared as a film in 2008, directed by Alex de la Iglesia, and starring John Hurt, Elijah Wood, Leonor Watling and Julie Cox.

== Books ==
- Vast Hell (Infierno grande, 1989) — short stories
- Regarding Roderer (Acerca de Roderer, 1993) — novel
- The Woman of the Master (La mujer del maestro, 1998) — novel
- Borges and Mathematics (Borges y las matemáticas, 2003) — essays
- The Oxford Murders (Crímenes imperceptibles, 2003) — novel
- The Immortality Formula (La fórmula de la inmortalidad, 2005) — essays
- The Book of Murder (La Muerte Lenta de Luciana B, 2007) — novel
- Gödel (para todos), 2009 — essay
- Lalu la luco, 2016 — novel
- The Oxford Brotherhood (Little, Brown, 2021) — novel ISBN 978-1-64313-877-0
