= Jon Edward Martin =

American author

John Edward Martin
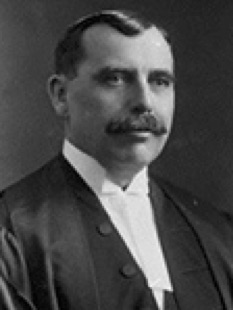
- Occupation: Writer
- Children: 4

Jon Edward Martin (born 1947) is an American author who writes novels in the historical fiction genre. He is best known for his novels set in Ancient Greece. He is a native of Massachusetts and holds a bachelor's degree in English Literature. He is married with four children, a daughter and three sons, and lives in Virginia.

Martin is a member of the Historical Novel Society. He is also an assistant editor for Sparta - Journal of Ancient Spartan and Greek History.

== Works ==
Martin's fiction works follow the historic sequence of ancient events. He typically writes his novels using ancient terminology and location names.

His first novel was IN KATHAIRON'S SHADOW. His subsequent historical novels were all set in ancient Greece, including a novel about the Battle of Marathon: the HEADLONG GOD OF WAR, and an epic novel about the battle that changed the route of ancient Sparta’s history, SHADE OF ARTEMIS. His latest work is a continuation of "Shades of Artemis" entitled, "NEMESIS". This novel follows the life of the Spartan commander named "Gylippus," the architect of Athen's calamitous defeat at the battle of Syracuse.
