= Tobias Druitt =

Tobias Druitt is an author of fantasy novels. Tobias Druitt is the pseudonym of two authors who write together, Diane Purkiss and Michael Dowling.

Diane Purkiss is a tutor in English at Keble College, Oxford University, and she is the first Oxford English faculty member since C. S. Lewis and J. R. R. Tolkien to publish a children's book.

Michael Dowling is Diane Purkiss' son. He is one of the subjects of the ongoing Channel 4 documentary series, Child Genius.

== Bibliography ==
- Corydon and the Island of Monsters (2005)
- Corydon and the Fall of Atlantis (2006)
- Corydon and the Siege of Troy (2007)
