= The Sacred Land =

2003 novel by H.N. Turteltaub

- Author: H. N. Turteltaub
- Language: English
- Series: Hellenic Traders
- Genre: Historical novel
- Publisher: Forge Books (Tor)
- Publication date: 2003
- Publication place: United States
- Media type: Print (Hardcover & Paperback)
- Pages: 380
- ISBN: 0-7653-0037-0
- OCLC: 52429839
- Dewey Decimal: 813/.54 21
- LC Class: PS3570.U758 S24 2003
- Preceded by: The Gryphon's Skull
- Followed by: Owls to Athens

The Sacred Land is a historical novel written by H.N. Turteltaub (a pseudonym of Harry Turtledove). It was first published in hardcover by Forge Books in December 2003, and in paperback by Tor Books in March 2005. The book was reissued under the author's real name as a trade paperback and ebook by Phoenix Pick in December 2014. It is the third book in the Hellenic Traders series.

== Plot ==
The book concerns the continuing adventures of a pair of Greek traders from Rhodes. Sostratos, the more scholarly of the pair, visits Jerusalem, where he tries to learn more about the odd monotheists who live there. His cousin Menedemos, meanwhile, fulfills his usual role of paying more attention to profits than prophets and pays a great deal of attention to women (occasionally those married to other men).

== Setting ==
The setting is the coast of Asia Minor, Cyprus, and Jerusalem and the surrounding area in the period of time about thirty years after the death of Alexander the Great. As in the other books in the series, persons and places are frequently given their Greek names rather than the English ones (Sokrates, Platon, etc.).
