= Maude Meagher =

American novelist

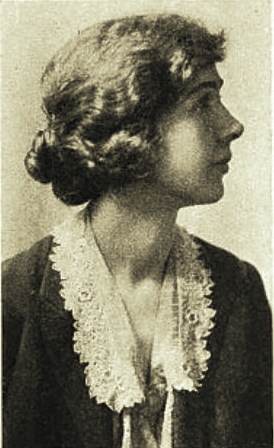
Meagher in 1925

Maude Meagher (8 April 1895 – 1977) was an American novelist.

== Biography ==
Maude Meagher was born in Boston, Massachusetts to Rev. H.A. Meagher and Anne Maude Tomlinson. She graduated from the University of California, Berkeley in 1917, where she met her lifelong friend Catherine Urner.

Meagher became a reporter for the San Francisco Chronicle in 1918. In 1919-1920, she worked as a foreign correspondent and an actress in England and Germany, and then traveled with her friend Catherine through France, Algeria and Italy. In 1925, she wrote the adventure novel Copper Mountain: Adventurous Days Among the Eskimos partly based on the books of Vilhjalmur Stefansson. In 1930 she published her novel, White Jade, a historical novel about Yang Kuei-fei telling how Po Chu'i (Bo Juyi) came to write his famous poem "Everlasting Sorrow" about Yang. In 1934, she wrote "The Green Scamander," a novel about the Trojan War from the viewpoint of the Amazons. She is the author of Fantastic Traveller (1931), the tale of a young man living in a world of his dreams.

With her friend Carolyn Smiley, Meagher started publishing World Youth magazine. They ran the magazine out of an adobe house called "Casa Tierra" which they built and lived in. When it was completed in 1947, it was reportedly the largest secular adobe in North America. They wrote of their experience in a book entitled How We Built An Adobe House For World Youth. Because of the acoustics, which he considered ideal, their friend famed violinist Yehudi Menuhin loved to play the violin in the great room.

== Novels ==
1. Copper Mountain: Adventurous Days Among the Eskimos (1925)
2. White Jade (1930)
3. Fantastic Traveller (1931)
4. The Green Scamander (1934)

Rattle snake god,1958 John Holden is Maude Marion Meagher/ Jonn Day books

== Footnotes ==
=== Sources ===
- Grant, John; Clute, John (1999). The Encyclopedia of Fantasy. New York: St. Martin's Griffin. pp. 23, 636, 987. ISBN 978-0-312-19869-5.
- Barbara Urner Johnson (2003). Catherine Urner: A Musical Affaire. Ashgate Publishing, Ltd. ISBN 978-0-7546-3331-0.
- Sarah Waters (Autumn 1996). "Wolfskins and Togas: Maude Meagher's The Green Scamander and the Lesbian Historical Novel". Women: A Cultural Review. 7 (2): 176–188. doi:10.1080/09574049608578272.
