= Phillip Parotti =

American fiction writer and educator (born 1941)

Phillip Elliott Parotti (born May 18, 1941) is an American fiction writer and educator.

Parotti was born in Silver City, New Mexico, the son of Abramo Angelo Parotti, a college professor, and Jerry Ann (née Elliott), a pianist. He married Shirley Brewer in 1964. A former U.S. naval officer, Dr. Parotti was a literature professor at Sam Houston State University in Huntsville, Texas, from 1972 until his retirement in 2004, and was the fiction editor of Texas Review from 1976 to 1984. Besides his novels, he has had short fiction published in a number of periodicals. His three mytho-historical novels, The Greek Generals Talk, The Trojan Generals Talk, and Fires in the Sky, all relate to the Trojan War, and have all been critically well received.

== Selected bibliography ==
- The Greek Generals Talk: Memoirs of the Trojan War (1986).
- The Trojan Generals Talk: Memoirs of the Greek War (1988).
- Fires in the Sky (1990).
- "Splinter on the Tide" (2021).
- "A Cast of Falcons" (2021).
- "In the Shadows of Guadalcanal" (2022) Winner of the Arizona-New Mexico Book Award for Historical Fiction.
- "Riders Upon the Storm" (2023).
- "Through Bitter Seas" (2023).

== Sources ==
- Literature Resource Centre, Sam Houston State University website.
