= Mary Ray (author) =

British children's author

- Born: 12 March 1932 Rugby, England
- Died: 6 May 2003 (aged 71) Canterbury, England
- Subject: Children's literature about Ancient Greece, the Roman Empire, and Early Christianity

Mary Eva Pedder Ray (1932–2003) was an English author of historical fiction for children set in ancient Greece and the Roman Empire. Several novels depict early Christianity.

== Early life and education ==
Mary Ray was born on 12 March 1932 in Rugby, England to William John and Dora (née Moule) Ray. She said she "had a passion for ancient history since the age of six."

Ray attended Birmingham College of Art and Crafts (1950-1952), then received a diploma in social studies from the College of the Ascension (1954). She then attended the University of Kent, from which she earned a Bachelor of Arts in classical civilization and a Master of Arts in church history.

== Career ==
Ray published her first novel, The Voice of Apollo, in 1964, which became the first of six novels about Ancient Greece. She also wrote eight novels about the Roman Empire and Early Christianity, as well as three plays.

In addition to writing, Ray worked as a church social worker in Sheffield (1957–1961), a welfare worker in Warwickshire (1961–1962), and a civil servant in Birmingham and London (1962–1988).

== Personal life ==
Ray died in Canterbury on 6 May 2003.

== Publications ==
=== Novels of Ancient Greece ===
- The Voice of Apollo. Illustrated by John Cooper. London, England: J. Cape. 1964.
- Standing Lions. Illustrated by Janet Duchesne. London, England: Faber. 1968.
- Living in Earliest Greece. Illustrated by Peter Branfield. London, England: Faber. 1969.
- Shout Against the Wind. Illustrated by Peter Branfield. London, England: Faber. 1970.
- Song of Thunder. London, England: Faber. 1978.
- The Golden Bees. London, England: Faber. 1984.

=== Novels of the Roman Empire and Early Christianity ===
- The Eastern Beacon. Illustrated by Janet Duchesne. London, England: J. Cape. 1965.
- Spring Tide. Illustrated by Janet Duchesne. London, England: Faber. 1969.
- A Tent for the Sun. London, England: Faber. 1971.
- The Ides of April. London, England: Faber. 1974.
- Sword Sleep. London, England: Faber. 1975.
- Beyond the Desert Gate. London, England: Faber. 1977.
- Rain from the West. London, England: Faber. 1980.
- The Windows of Elissa. London, England: Faber. 1982.

=== Theater ===
- The Mary Rose, 1983
- Dragons and Dinosaurs, 1985
- The Dolphin Boy, 1985
