= The Dancer from Atlantis =

1971 science fiction novel by Poul Anderson

- Cover of first edition
- Author: Poul Anderson
- Cover artist: Frank Frazetta
- Language: English
- Subject: time travel
- Genre: science fiction novel
- Publisher: Nelson Doubleday
- Publication date: 1971
- Publication place: United States
- Pages: 183
- OCLC: 162174

The Dancer from Atlantis is a science fiction novel by American writer Poul Anderson, first published in 1971 by Doubleday.

== Plot summary ==
While on a passenger ship, Duncan Reid is sucked into a vortex and finds himself on a deserted beach with 3 other people. A strange metal cylinder on the beach opens up and an injured man steps out who gives Reid a device that allows the user to instantly learn a new language. He explains to Reid a time travel accident has occurred before dying from his wounds. The others are, Oleg from medieval Rus', the Hunnic warrior Uldin and a Minoan woman called Erissa who claims to have met Duncan over 20 years ago. The group is rescued aboard a ship from Mycenaean Greece. The ship takes them to Athens where they are received by king Aegeus and his son Theseus. Reid learns from Erissa that in few months the island she was living on, which she calls 'Atlantis' (Thera), will be destroyed in a volcanic eruption. Reid is allowed to go to 'Atlantis' while Oleg offers to build a ship for the Athenians.

On the island Reid meets with the high priestess (Ariadne) named 'Lydra' and a young Bull Dancer who is Erissa but 24 years younger. After young Erissa leaves for Knossos, Lydra has Reid imprisoned; she is conspiring with Theseus to take power and rule with him over both Athens and Crete. Reid escapes with the help of Erissa and Uldin and they are on their way to Crete when the volcano erupts. As they arrive in Knossos, the city has been hit with a tsunami and in the chaos Theseus and his men have taken over and killed king Minos. They save young Erissa and Uldin is killed in the fight. Afterwards, they set out to sea but are intercepted by Oleg's ship. At that moment a time ship has noticed the anachronistic design of Oleg's vessel, saves the time travelers and returns them to their original time and space.

== Characters ==
Duncan Reid
An American architect from early 1970's Seattle.
Erissa
A woman living on Rhodes in the Bronze Age Minoan civilization who experienced the great Minoan eruption.
Oleg Vladimirovitch
A merchant and ship owner living in Kievan Rus' during the reign of Yaroslav the Wise.
Uldin
A Hun nomadic warrior living in the late 4th century AD.
