= José Carlos Somoza =

Spanish author (born 1959)

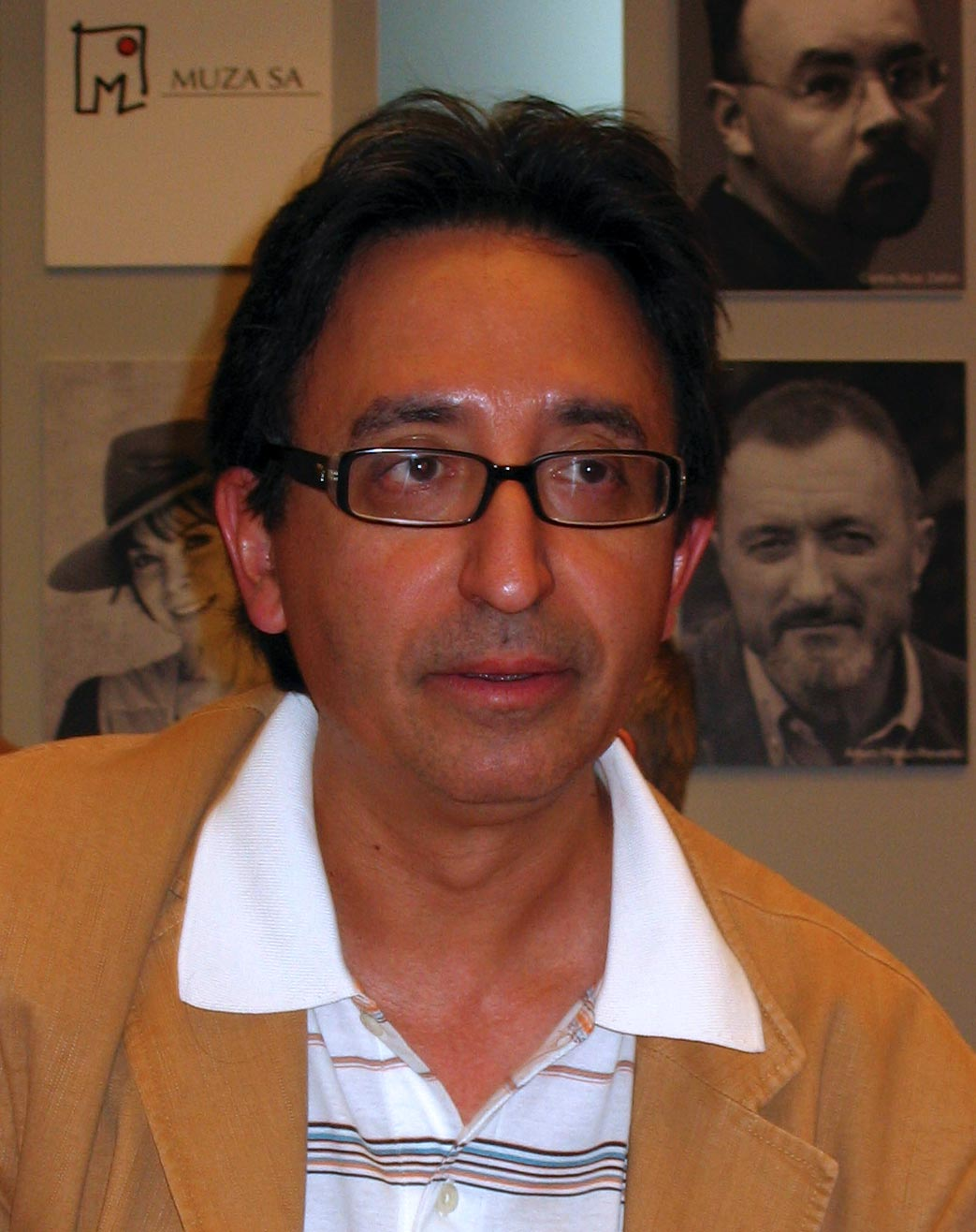
- Somoza in 2006
- Born: 13 November 1959 (age 66); Havana, Cuba
- Writing career
- Language: Spanish
- Notable work: The Athenian Murders
- Notable awards: 2002 CWA Gold Dagger; 2007 Premio de Novela Ciudad de Torrevieja
- Website: www.josecarlossomoza.com

José Carlos Somoza Ortega (born 13 November 1959) is a Spanish author. He was born in Havana, Cuba. In 1960 his family moved to Spain after being exiled for being from a bourgeoisie class. His family proved to be in difficult financial situation after having moved to Spain because they had been forbidden to take anything along except their child. And there were a lot of friends who helped them a lot during their first years in Spain. He holds a Bachelor's Degree in psychiatry, but he gave up medicine in order to become a full-time writer in 1994. Since 1994 he made his first steps in writing and sent his works to the different literature competitions, to magazines and publishers all over Spain. And his first book was published the same year. When his fifth novel The Cave of Ideas obtained an international acknowledge, he realized that he had chosen the right route in his life.

== Works ==
- Planos (1994)
- El silencio de Blanca (1996)
- Miguel Will (1997) (play)
- Cartas de un asesino insignificante (1999)
- La ventana pintada (1999)
- La caverna de las ideas (2000; The Athenian Murders, 2002, shortlisted for the UK's Independent Foreign Fiction Prize, winner of the CWA Gold Dagger)
- Dafne desvanecida (2000; shortlisted for Spain's Nadal Prize)
- Clara y la penumbra (2001; The Art of Murder, 2004)
- La dama número trece (2003)
- La caja de marfil (2004)
- El detalle (tres novelas breves) (included : Planos, El detalle and La boca) (2005)
- Zig Zag (2006; Zig Zag, 2007)
- Fantasmas de papel (2007)
- La llave del abismo (2007)
- El cebo (2010)
- Tetrammeron : Los cuentos de Soledad (2012)
- La cuarta señal (2014)
- Croatoan (2015)
- El origen del mal (2018)
- Estudio en negro (2019)
- El signo de los diez (2022)

== Awards ==
- The Second Gabriel Sijé Short Story Award for "Planes" (1994)
- The Margarita Xirgu Prize for dramatic radio scripts, convened by Radio Exterior de España and the Ibero-American Cooperation Institute for his screenplay "Langostas" (1994)
- The Cervantes Theater Award (INAEM) for his play "Miguel Will" (1997)
- The Café Gijón Award for his novel "La ventana pintada" (1998)
- Finalist for the Nadal Prize for his novel "Dafne Desvanecida" (2000)
- Fernando Lara Novel Award for Clara y la penumbra (2001)
- The Hammett Prize of black novel with "Clara and the penumbra" (2002)
- The Macallan Gold Dagger For Fiction Award 2002, awarded by the Mystery Writers Association of the United Kingdom for his novel "The Cave of Ideas" (2002)
- Flintyxan Award for the best historical police novel, awarded to "The Cave of Ideas" by the Association of Swedish Novel Writers (2004)
- Special mention in the Premio Celsius 232 (to the best work of science fiction or fantasy of 2007 written in Spanish) for The Key of the Abyss (La llave del abismo) in the 21 Black Week of Gijón
- The Key of the Abyss (La llave del abismo) received the Premio de Novela Ciudad de Torrevieja.
