= The Praise Singer =

Book by Mary Renault

- First edition cover
- Author: Mary Renault
- Genre: Historical fiction
- Publisher: Pantheon Books
- Publication date: 1978
- ISBN: 978-0-394-50273-1

The Praise Singer is a historical novel by British novelist Mary Renault first published in 1978. Its narrator and main character is the real-life lyric poet Simonides of Ceos, whose life (ca. 556 BC-469 BCE) spanned the transition from an oral to a written culture in Ancient Greece. Renault's fiction argues that this transition was in part responsible for the cultural flowering known as the Golden Age of Athens—though she also gives credit to Hipparchus, Tyrant of Athens, who attracted talented artists like Simonides to live in his city. Renault depicts him as having the works of Homer set down in writing for the first time.

The book contains portraits of several other historical figures, such as the mathematician/philosopher Pythagoras, and the erotic poet Anakreon.

== Plot summary ==
The book follows the life of Simonides from the point of view of his older self. As a boy, silent and lacking confidence due to his extreme ugliness, he is brought up with strict discipline by his father, Leoprepes. He finds comfort in the love of his handsome older brother Theasides, and in music. When a travelling singer, Kleobis, visits Keos to perform at a wedding, Simonides begs to be taken on as an apprentice. This Kleobis does, and they leave together on their travels.

Under Kleobis' tutelage Simonides becomes a talented composer and performer, but he remains physically ugly. This proves a severe disadvantage when, after the fall of Kleobis' native city of Ephesos to the Persians, Kleobis and Simonides attempt to find a patron at the court of Polycrates of Samos. Polycrates is a connoisseur of beauty, in boys as much as in music or art, and Simonides' appearance is not a recommendation. Kleobis and Simonides find themselves out of fashion at court, and scrabbling for work.

Simonides travels back to Keos to enter a music contest, leaving Kleobis behind in Samos nursing a slight illness. He wins the contest, but discovers, on returning, that Kleobis has died.

Simonides now finds a patron in Peisistratus, the tyrant of Athens. He becomes a successful musician in that city, and after Peisistratos' death, his sons Hippias and Hipparchus continue the family's patronage. Through Hipparchos, Simonides is introduced to the hetaira Lyra, whose lover he becomes. Hipparchos himself is sexually oriented to boys, not women, and Simonides witnesses his eventual downfall, when Hipparchos uses his political power to punish the family of a young boy who rejects his advances, and the boy and his lover retaliate by murdering him. Here Renault draws on the tale of Harmodius and Aristogeiton, also known as the Tyrannicides (τυραννοκτόνοι), whose attack against the Peisistratid tyranny made them iconic personages of Athenian democracy.
