= List of historical fiction by time period =

This list of historical fiction is designed to provide examples of notable works of historical fiction (in literature, film, comics, etc.) organized by time period.

For a more exhaustive list of historical novels by period, see Category:Historical novels by setting, which lists relevant Wikipedia categories; see also the larger List of historical novels, which is organized by country, as well as the more general Category:Historical novels and Category:Historical fiction.

== Novels ==
=== Set in Prehistory (c. 30,000 BC – 3000 BC) ===
- Before Adam by Jack London
- Earth's Children series by Jean Auel
- Stonehenge by Bernard Cornwell
- Pillar of the Sky by Cecelia Holland
- Mammoth Trilogy by Stephen Baxter
- The Gathering Night by Margaret Elphinstone
- Chronicles of Ancient Darkness by Michelle Paver
- First North Americans by W. Michael Gear and Kathleen O'Neal Gear
- The King Must Die and The Bull from the Sea by Mary Renault
- The Inheritors by William Golding
- The Quest for Fire by J.-H. Rosny

=== Set in Classical Antiquity (c. 3000 BC – 500 AD) ===
- Pharaoh by Bolesław Prus
- The Egyptian and The Secret of the Kingdom by Mika Waltari
- River God by Wilbur Smith
- Child of the Morning by Pauline Gedge
- Ancient Evenings by Norman Mailer
- Men of Bronze by Scott Oden
- Death Comes as the End by Agatha Christie
- The Song of Achilles by Madeline Miller
- Troy series by David Gemmell
- Homer's Daughter by Robert Graves
- Creation by Gore Vidal
- Gates of Fire, Last of the Amazons, The Virtues of War, The Afghan Campaign and Tides of War by Steven Pressfield
- Hannibal by Ross Leckie
- Salammbô by Gustave Flaubert
- Fire from Heaven, The Persian Boy, and Funeral Games by Mary Renault
- Child of a Dream, The Sands of Ammon, and The Ends of the Earth (Alexander Trilogy) by Valerio Massimo Manfredi
- Memnon by Scott Oden
- The Source by James A. Michener
- The Red Tent by Anita Diamant
- The Madonna Secret by Sophie Strand
- Siddhartha by Hermann Hesse
- Lavinia by Ursula K. Le Guin
- Masters of Rome series by Colleen McCullough
- Roma Sub Rosa series by Steven Saylor
- Imperium, Lustrum, and Dictator (Cicero Trilogy) by Robert Harris
- Emperor series by Conn Iggulden
- Kleopatra Pharaoh by Karen Essex
- The Memoirs of Cleopatra by Margaret George
- The Ides of March by Thornton Wilder
- Augustus by John Williams
- Ben-Hur: A Tale of the Christ by Lew Wallace
- King Jesus by Robert Graves
- The Bronze Bow by Elizabeth George Speare
- Christ the Lord: Out of Egypt and Christ the Lord: The Road to Cana by Anne Rice
- The Gospel According to the Son by Norman Mailer
- The Gospel According to Lazarus by Richard Zimler
- The Last Temptation of Christ by Nikos Kazantzakis
- The Robe by Lloyd C. Douglas
- The Silver Chalice by Thomas B. Costain
- I, Claudius and Claudius the God by Robert Graves
- Eagles of the Empire series and Gladiator series by Simon Scarrow
- Insaan Aur Devta by Nasim Hijazi
- Quo Vadis: A Narrative of the Time of Nero by Henryk Sienkiewicz
- The Last Days of Pompeii by Edward Bulwer-Lytton
- Pompeii by Robert Harris
- Memoirs of Hadrian by Marguerite Yourcenar
- The Eagle of the Ninth by Rosemary Sutcliff
- Helena by Evelyn Waugh
- Judge Dee by Robert Van Gulik
- Romance of the Three Kingdoms by Luo Guanzhong and retold by Eiji Yoshikawa
- Julian by Gore Vidal
- Raptor by Gary Jennings
- A Struggle for Rome by Felix Dahn

=== Set in the Middle Ages (c. AD 500 – 1500) ===
- A Dream of Eagles (aka Camulod Chronicles) by Jack Whyte (4th–6th)
- The Warlord Chronicles by Bernard Cornwell (6th)
- Count Belisarius by Robert Graves (6th)
- Tom a Lincoln by Richard Johnson
- The King's Sons by George Manville Fenn (9th)
- Pope Joan by Donna Woolfolk Cross (9th)
- The Saxon Stories by Bernard Cornwell (9th–10th)
- Corban Loosestrife series by Cecelia Holland (10th)
- The Whale Road, The Wolf Sea and others (Oathsworn series) by Robert Low (late 10th)
- The Long Ships (Röde Orm) by Frans G. Bengtsson (late 10th)
- The Evening and the Morning (Kingsbridge series) by Ken Follett (late 10th)
- Lion of Ireland and Pride of Lions by Morgan Llywelyn (late 10th–early 11th)
- Vinland by George Mackay Brown (early 11th)
- The Physician by Noah Gordon (11th)
- Samarkand by Amin Maalouf (11th)
- The Jester by James Patterson and Andrew Gross (11th)
- The Last English King by Julian Rathbone (mid-11th)
- The Wake by Paul Kingsnorth (late 11th)
- King Raven series (Hood, Scarlet, and Tuck) by Stephen R. Lawhead (late 11th)
- The Jester by James Patterson and Andrew Gross (late 11th)
- The Badger of Ghissi by Wolf von Niebelschütz (12th)
- When Christ and His Saints Slept, Time and Chance, and Devil's Brood (Plantagenet series) by Sharon Kay Penman (12th)
- The Pillars of the Earth (Kingsbridge series) by Ken Follett (12th)
- The Walking Drum by Louis L'Amour (12th)
- The Cadfael Chronicles by Ellis Peters (mid-12th)
- The Ruby in Her Navel by Barry Unsworth (12th)
- Kay the Left-Handed by Leslie Barringer (12th)
- Anna of Byzantium by Tracy Barrett (12th)
- Gertrude and Claudius by John Updike (12th)
- The Sign of the Chrysanthemum by Katherine Paterson (12th)
- Witiko by Adalbert Stifter
- New Tale of the Heike by Eiji Yoshikawa (late 12th)
- Ivanhoe, The Talisman and others (Waverley Novels) by Sir Walter Scott (late 12th)
- Insurrection by Robyn Young (13th)
- Wolf of the Plains, Lords of the Bow and others (Conqueror series) by Conn Iggulden (13th)
- Here Be Dragons, Falls the Shadow, and The Reckoning (Welsh Princes series) by Sharon Kay Penman (13th)
- Brethren, Crusade, and Requiem (Brethren Trilogy) by Robyn Young (13th)
- The Black Rose by Thomas B. Costain (13th)
- Poland by James A. Michener (mid-13th–early 15th)
- The Journeyer by Gary Jennings (late 13th–early 14th)
- The Lion of Flanders by Hendrik Conscience (late 13th–early 14th)
- The Name of the Rose by Umberto Eco (early 14th)
- Valperga by Mary Shelley (early 14th)
- Harlequin, Vagabond, Heretic and 1356 (The Grail Quest series) by Bernard Cornwell (14th)
- The Accursed Kings (Les Rois maudits) by Maurice Druon (14th)
- Katherine by Anya Seton (14th)
- World Without End (Kingsbridge series) by Ken Follett (14th)
- Kristin Lavransdatter series and The Master of Hestviken series by Sigrid Undset (14th)
- The Knights of the Cross (Krzyżacy) by Henryk Sienkiewicz (14th–early 15th)
- Cathedral of the Sea (La catedral del mar) by Ildefonso Falcones (late 14th)
- Morality Play by Barry Unsworth (late 14th)
- L'Anneau du pêcheur by Jean Raspail (late 14th–early 15th)
- Azincourt by Bernard Cornwell (early 15th)
- The Sunne in Splendour by Sharon Kay Penman (15th)
- The Hunchback of Notre-Dame by Victor Hugo
- The House of Niccolò series by Dorothy Dunnett (mid-15th)
- Quentin Durward by Walter Scott (15th)
- The Birth of Venus by Sarah Dunant (late 15th)
- The Family by Mario Puzo (late 15th)
- Romola by George Eliot (late 15th)
- I, Mona Lisa by Jeanne Kalogridis (late 15th)

=== Set in the Early Modern Period (c. 1500 – 1760) ===
- The King's Cavalier by Samuel Shellabarger (late 15th–early 16th)
- Prince of Foxes by Samuel Shellabarger (early 16th)
- Leonardo's Swans by Karen Essex (early 16th)
- Then and Now by W. Somerset Maugham
- Q by Luther Blissett
- As minas de prata by José de Alencar
- Three Sisters, Three Queens by Philippa Gregory
- The Heart of Jade (El corazón de piedra verde) by Salvador de Madariaga (early 16th)
- The Last Kabbalist of Lisbon by Richard Zimler (early 16th)
- Wolf Hall and Bring Up the Bodies by Hilary Mantel (16th)
- Aztec by Gary Jennings (16th)
- The Bridge on the Drina by Ivo Andrić (16th–20th)
- The Tournament by Matthew Reilly (mid-16th)
- Matthew Shardlake series by C. J. Sansom (mid-16th)
- Lymond Chronicles by Dorothy Dunnett (mid-16th)
- Brazil Red by Jean-Christophe Rufin (mid-16th)
- The Siege of Malta by Walter Scott (mid-16th)
- My Name is Red by Orhan Pamuk (late 16th)
- La Reine Margot by Alexandre Dumas (late 16th)
- Shōgun by James Clavell (late 16th)
- A Dead Man in Deptford by Anthony Burgess (late 16th)
- Kenilworth by Walter Scott (late 16th)
- The Orenda by Joseph Boyden (early 17th)
- The Three Musketeers by Alexandre Dumas (early 17th)
- Black Robe by Brian Moore
- The White Castle by Orhan Pamuk (17th)
- Hunger's Brides by W. Paul Anderson (17th)
- Silence by Shūsaku Endō (17th)
- With Fire and Sword, The Deluge and Fire in the Steppe by Henryk Sienkiewicz (17th)
- Waverley, Rob Roy and others (Waverley Novels) by Walter Scott (17th)
- I promessi sposi (The Betrothed) by Alessandro Manzoni (mid-17th)
- Memoirs of a Cavalier by Daniel Defoe (mid-17th)
- The Scarlet Letter by Nathaniel Hawthorne (mid-17th)
- Captain Alatriste by Arturo Pérez-Reverte (mid-17th)
- Royal Escape by Georgette Heyer (mid-17th)
- An Instance of the Fingerpost by Iain Pears (mid-17th)
- Seek the Fair Land by Walter Macken (mid-17th)
- Girl with a Pearl Earring by Tracy Chevalier (mid-17th)
- The Deer and the Cauldron by Jin Yong (late 17th)
- Shinjū, The Snow Empress and others (Sano Ichiro series) by Laura Joh Rowland (late 17th)
- Imprimatur by Rita Monaldi and Francesco Sorti (late 17th)
- Leo Africanus and Balthasar's Odyssey by Amin Maalouf (16th / 17th)
- Hawaii, Chesapeake and Caribbean by James A. Michener
- Pirate Latitudes by Michael Crichton (17th)
- Rachel Dyer by John Neal (late 17th)
- The Bridge of San Luis Rey by Thornton Wilder (early 18th)
- Leatherstocking Tales by James Fenimore Cooper (18th)

=== Set during the Industrial Revolution and Napoleonic era (c. 1760 – 1850) ===
- Perfume: The Story of a Murderer by Patrick Süskind
- A Place Called Freedom by Ken Follett
- Mason & Dixon by Thomas Pynchon
- The Bastard, The Rebels and others (The Kent Family Chronicles) by John Jakes
- Logan by John Neal
- Drums Along the Mohawk by Walter D. Edmonds
- Seventy-Six by John Neal
- Brother Jonathan by John Neal
- Sergeant Lamb of the Ninth and Proceed, Sergeant Lamb by Robert Graves
- The Revolution at Sea saga by James L. Nelson
- The Fort by Bernard Cornwell
- Sharpe series by Bernard Cornwell
- A Tale of Two Cities by Charles Dickens
- Scaramouche by Rafael Sabatini
- Les Misérables by Victor Hugo
- La Sanfelice by Alexandre Dumas
- The Whiskey Rebels by David Liss
- The Red City by Silas Weir Mitchell
- Aubrey–Maturin series by Patrick O'Brian
- Hornblower series by C. S. Forester
- Lord Ramage by Dudley Pope
- The Bolitho novels by Alexander Kent
- The Secret River by Kate Grenville
- The Count of Monte Cristo by Alexandre Dumas
- Stealing Athena by Karen Essex
- Wellington and Napoleon Quartet by Simon Scarrow
- National Episodes by Benito Pérez Galdós
- Measuring the World by Daniel Kehlmann (early 19th)
- War and Peace by Leo Tolstoy
- The Berrybender Narratives by Larry McMurtry
- The Revenant by Michael Punke
- The Awakening Land trilogy by Conrad Richter
- Johnny Tremain by Esther Forbes
- Burr by Gore Vidal
- Poldark series by Winston Graham
- Alaska by James A. Michener
- The Confessions of Nat Turner by William Styron
- Roots: The Saga of an American Family by Alex Haley
- Tai-Pan by James Clavell
- April Morning by Howard Fast
- The Book of Negroes by Lawrence Hill
- Montevideo, or the new Troy by Alexandre Dumas
- The Playmaker by Thomas Keneally
- Isles of Despair by Ion Idriess
- The Far Pavilions by M. M. Kaye (19th)

=== Set during recent history (c. 1850 – 1950) ===
- The Flashman Papers by George MacDonald Fraser (1830s–1890s)
- The Starbuck Chronicles by Bernard Cornwell
- The Great Train Robbery by Michael Crichton
- Peony by Pearl S. Buck (1850s)
- The Four Horsemen of the Apocalypse by Vicente Blasco Ibáñez
- Cézanne’s Quarry by Barbara Corrado Pope
- The Blood of Lorraine by Barbara Corrado Pope
- The Missing Italian Girl by Barbara Corrado Pope
- The Lambing Flat by Nerida Newton
- The Last Crossing by Guy Vanderhaeghe
- Imperial Woman by Pearl S. Buck (1860s–1900s)
- North and South trilogy by John Jakes
- Shiloh by Shelby Foote (1862)
- The Killer Angels by Michael Shaara (1863)
- The James Reasoner Civil War Series by James Reasoner
- Andersonville by MacKinlay Kantor
- Little House on the Prairie series by Laura Ingalls Wilder
- Silk by Alessandro Baricco (1860s)
- The Leopard by Giuseppe Tomasi di Lampedusa (1860s)
- The Judges of the Secret Court by David Stacton (1865)
- Lonesome Dove series by Larry McMurtry (1870s)
- The Sackett series by Louis L'Amour
- Under the North Star trilogy by Väinö Linna (1880s–1950s)
- The Assassination of Jesse James by the Coward Robert Ford by Ron Hansen (1881–1882)
- Narratives of Empire series by Gore Vidal
- An Officer and a Spy by Robert Harris (1890s–1900s)
- The City Beautiful by Aden Polydoros (1893)
- Ragtime, Billy Bathgate, The March by E. L. Doctorow
- Fall of Giants, Winter of the World, and Edge of Eternity by Ken Follett
- Centennial, The Covenant, Texas, and Journey by James A. Michener
- The Road to Wellville by T. C. Boyle
- The War of the End of the World (La guerra del fin del mundo) by Mario Vargas Llosa (late 19th)
- Tai-Pan and Gai-Jin by James Clavell
- The Alienist and The Angel of Darkness (Kreizler series) by Caleb Carr
- The L.A. Quartet and the Underworld USA Trilogy by James Ellroy
- Beloved by Toni Morrison
- The Emigrants series by Vilhelm Moberg
- Gone with the Wind by Margaret Mitchell
- The Prague Cemetery by Umberto Eco
- Drood by Dan Simmons
- The Sorrow of Belgium by Hugo Claus (WWI)
- A Star Called Henry by Roddy Doyle (1910s)
- The Thorn Birds by Colleen McCullough (1915–1969)
- Troubles by J. G. Farrell (1919–1921)
- The Haj by Leon Uris (1922–1950s)
- The Winds of War and War and Remembrance by Herman Wouk (WWII)
- Schindler's Ark by Thomas Keneally (WWII)
- Enigma by Robert Harris (WWII)
- The Warsaw Anagrams by Richard Zimler (WWII)
- Exodus by Leon Uris (1940s)

== Theatre ==
=== Set 2000 BC – 600 AD ===
- Antony and Cleopatra, Julius Caesar, Timon of Athens, Titus Andronicus by William Shakespeare
- Britannicus by Jean Racine
- Caligula by Albert Camus
- Cato, a Tragedy by Joseph Addison
- The Death of Pompey by Pierre Corneille
- Socrates on Trial by Andrew David Irvine
- Caesar and Cleopatra by George Bernard Shaw
- The Siege of Numantia by Miguel de Cervantes
- Salome by Oscar Wilde

=== Set 600 AD – 1550 ===
- St Joan by George Bernard Shaw
- William Shakespeare's English history plays
- Edward II, Tamburlaine, and The Massacre at Paris by Christopher Marlowe
- Henry IV by Luigi Pirandello
- In Extremis: The Story of Abelard & Heloise and Anne Boleyn by Howard Brenton
- The Jester's Supper by Sem Benelli
- Marie Tudor by Victor Hugo
- Götz von Berlichingen by Johann Wolfgang von Goethe
- Murder in the Cathedral by T. S. Eliot
- Cortez: Or, The Conquest of Mexico by James Planché

=== Set after 1550 ===
- Egmont and Torquato Tasso by Johann Wolfgang von Goethe
- Mary Stuart and Demetrius by Friedrich Schiller
- Cross and Sword by Paul Green
- Cromwell by Victor Hugo

== Opera ==
=== Set 3000 BC – 600 AD ===
- Aida and Nabucco by Giuseppe Verdi
- Akhnaten by Philip Glass
- Cléopâtre and Hérodiade by Jules Massenet
- Mosè in Egitto by Gioachino Rossini
- Giulio Cesare by George Frideric Handel
- Les Troyens by Hector Berlioz
- Sapho by Charles Gounod
- L'Olimpiade by Metastasio
- Germanicus by Georg Philipp Telemann

=== Set 600 AD – 1800 ===
- Gustave III by Daniel Auber
- Henry VIII by Camille Saint-Saëns
- William Tell by Gioachino Rossini
- Les Huguenots and Le prophète by Giacomo Meyerbeer
- Fosca and Salvator Rosa by Antônio Carlos Gomes
- Fernand Cortez by Gaspare Spontini
- Thérèse by Jules Massenet
- Le roi l'a dit by Léo Delibes
- Tamerlano and Rodelinda by George Frideric Handel
- Les Abencérages by Luigi Cherubini
- Montezuma by Roger Sessions
- Macbeth by Giuseppe Verdi

== Films and television ==
=== Set in Prehistory (c. 30,000 BC – 3000 BC) ===
- 2001: A Space Odyssey 1968. First section.
- Iceman 2017

== Poetry ==
- The Destruction of Sennacherib by Lord Byron: Assyrian siege of Jerusalem, 8th century BC
- The Light of Asia by Sir Edwin Arnold: life of Gautama Buddha, 6th or 5th century BC
- The Rape of Lucrece by William Shakespeare: reign of Lucius Tarquinius Superbus in Rome, 6th century BC
- Horatius by Thomas Babington Macaulay: Horatius Cocles vs Lars Porsena, Rome, 6th century BC
- Roderick the Last of the Goths by Robert Southey: reign of Roderic, 8th century Hispania
- King Alfred by John Fitchett: reign of Alfred the Great, 9th century England
- The Ballad of the White Horse by G. K. Chesterton: reign of Alfred the Great, 9th century England
- The Saga of King Olaf by Henry Wadsworth Longfellow: reign of Olaf Tryggvason, 10th century Norway
- Madoc by Robert Southey: legend of Madoc, 12th century Wales
- Isabella, or the Pot of Basil and The Eve of St. Agnes by John Keats: European Middle Ages
- Marmion by Sir Walter Scott: reign of Henry VIII of England & the Battle of Flodden, 1513
- The Revenge: A Ballad of the Fleet by Alfred, Lord Tennyson: Battle of Flores, 1591
- Bonnie Dundee by Sir Walter Scott: Viscount Dundee and the Jacobite rising of 1689
- Evangeline by Henry Wadsworth Longfellow: the Expulsion of the Acadians (1755–1764)
- Paul Revere's Ride by Henry Wadsworth Longfellow: American Revolutionary War (1775)
- Battle of Niagara by John Neal: War of 1812

== Comics ==
=== Prehistoric ===
- Rahan by Roger Lecureux and Jean-François Lecureux
- Akim by Roberto Renzi

=== Ancient ===
- 300 by Frank Miller
- Age of Bronze by Eric Shanower

=== Wuxia manhua ===
- Three Kingdoms by Yū Terashima
- Fung Wan by Ma Wing-shing
- Crouching Tiger, Hidden Dragon by Andy Seto
- The Ravages of Time by Chan Mou
- Threads of Time by Noh Mi-young
- Ying Xiong Wu Lei by Ma Wing Shing

=== Samurai manga ===
- Rurouni Kenshin by Nobuhiro Watsuki
- Azumi by Yū Koyama
- Path of the Assassin by Kazuo Koike

== See also ==
- List of historical novels
- List of historical novelists
- List of historical video games
- List of fiction set in ancient Greece
- List of fiction set in ancient Rome
