= Pierre de Severy =

Marshal of the Knights Templar (died 1291)

- Died: 28 May 1291; Acre, Outremer
- Military career
- Allegiance: Knights Templar
- Rank: Marshal of the Knights Templar

Pierre de Severy (also Peter de Severy; died 28 May 1291) was Marshal of the Knights Templar during the mastership of Guillaume de Beaujeu. He is best known for commanding the final Templar resistance during the Siege of Acre, where he was killed following the collapse of the city's defenses and a final stand at the Temple fortress.

== Background ==
Originally from Burgundy, Pierre de Severy served as Draper of the Knights Templar around 1283. He was appointed Marshal of the Order by late 1289 or 1290, succeeding Geoffroy de Vandac, who had served in the role during the fall of Tripoli.

== Siege of Acre (1291) ==
In 1291, de Severy was present at the Siege of Acre in his capacity as Marshal, serving under Grand Master Guillaume de Beaujeu. On 18 May 1291, the Mamluks launched a general assault and breached the city's walls. Guillaume de Beaujeu was mortally wounded during the fighting and died shortly afterward, leaving de Severy as the senior Templar commander leading the defense within the city.

On the night of 25–26 May, de Severy dispatched Thibaud Gaudin by sea to Sidon carrying the treasury of the Order, along with non-combatants who could be evacuated. He then continued to hold the Templar fortress, the last Crusader stronghold still resisting, to protect the civilians sheltering within while they awaited further evacuation.

Sultan Al-Ashraf Khalil offered terms: if the Templars surrendered the fortress, the lives of those sheltering within would be spared. De Severy accepted. However, when Mamluk soldiers entered the fortress and began attacking the civilians, the Templars expelled them and barred the gates. The Sultan subsequently sent word that his men had acted without orders and invited de Severy to his camp to personally renew the terms. On 28 May, de Severy and his companions emerged to negotiate but were promptly bound and executed. Following the executions, the Sultan's forces undermined the fortress; the building collapsed during the final storming, killing the remaining defenders and the Mamluk attackers inside.

Following de Severy's death, Thibaud Gaudin was elected Grand Master of the Order in Cyprus.

== See also ==
- Siege of Acre (1291)
- Guillaume de Beaujeu
- Thibaud Gaudin
- Knights Templar
- Fall of Outremer
