= Kleopatra Pharaoh =

2001 novel by Karen Essex

Kleopatra and Pharaoh are two volumes of a novel by historical novelist Karen Essex, author of Leonardo's Swans and Stealing Athena. The books emphasize the Egyptian queen’s Greek roots as a descendant of Alexander the Great and re-imagine her as an astute ruler and diplomat.
