= Mary Bruce, Countess of Elgin =

British heiress (1777–1855), wife of Lord Elgin

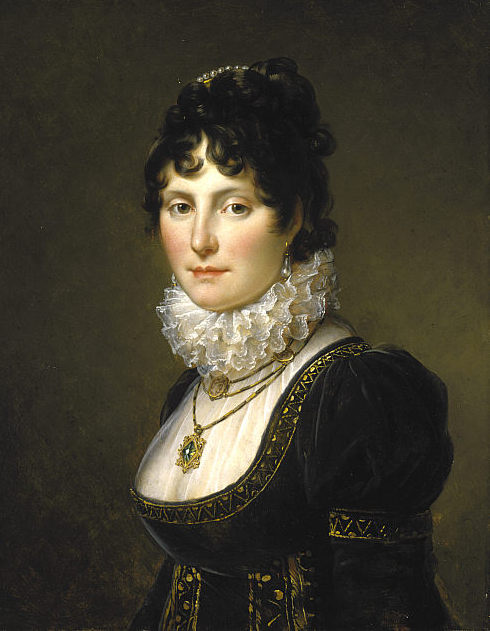
Portrait of Mary Nisbet by François Gérard, 1803

Mary Hamilton Bruce, Countess of Elgin (née Nisbet; 18 April 1778 – 9 July 1855) was the first wife of British diplomat Thomas Bruce, 7th Earl of Elgin during his term as Ambassador Extraordinaire to the Ottoman Empire and one of the most influential and wealthiest heiresses of the late 18th and early 19th century.

== Early life ==
Mary Hamilton Nisbet was born on 18 April 1778 in Dirleton. Her parents were of the landed gentry; William Hamilton Nisbet was a Scottish landowner, one of the few who owned large estates in Scotland. Her mother, also called Mary (née Manners) was a granddaughter of John Manners, 2nd Duke of Rutland. Nisbet grew up on the Archerfield Estate, not far from Edinburgh. From an early age she kept a detailed diary. During her teens Nisbet's father became a Member of Parliament, and the family traveled to London, where she entered society via her grandmother, Lady Robert Manners. According to biographer Susan Nagel, "she was noted to be very mature for her age and often joined her parents at gatherings traditionally held for grown-ups."

== Marriage to Earl of Elgin ==
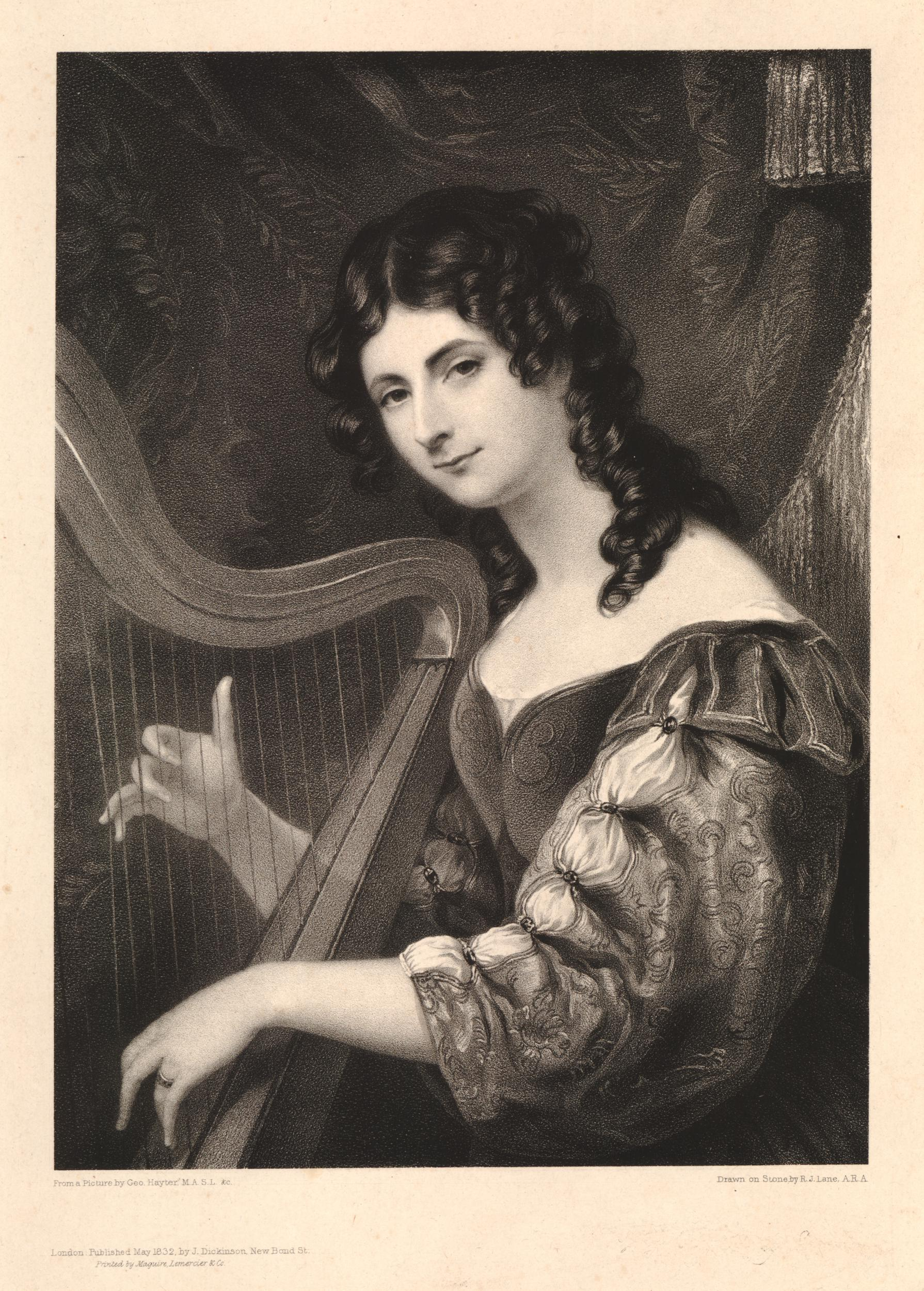
Lady Mary Nisbet-Hamilton playing harp

Mary Nisbet met Thomas Bruce, 7th Earl of Elgin, who had only recently become Ambassador to the Ottoman Empire, in 1798. The pair were distantly related via the Montagus and were considered a good match by both families. They married on 11 March 1799. After spending the wedding night at Archerfield the couple travelled to Bruce's home in Broomhall, Fife.

Following a short stint in London the couple left England on 3 September 1799 so that Bruce could take up his ambassadorial position; sailing from Portsmouth on HMS Phaeton. By this point Nisbet was pregnant but decided to travel with her new husband. During the two-month voyage they visited Lisbon and Gibraltar (as guests of Charles O'Hara), Sicily, Palermo, Messina and Tenodoes before arriving in Constantinople.

It was a difficult time in Constantinople; English people were not well liked or trusted. The couple moved into the old French embassy (which had recently been vacated) which Mary Bruce then had decorated and where she hosted lavish parties. In November, with the permission of the Grand Vizier, she became the first woman to attend a political Ottoman ceremony. Despite being five months pregnant she was required to dress as a man.

The Bruces had five children, two sons and three daughters:

- George Charles Constantine (1800–1840), died unmarried and before his father, known by the courtesy title of Lord Bruce.
- Mary, married on 28 January 1828, Robert Dundas
- Matilda-Harrie, married on 14 October 1839, John Maxwell, son and heir of Sir John Maxwell, 7th Baronet
- William, died young of illness on 8 April 1805. It is debated whether or not William was the child of Lord Elgin.
- Lucy, married on 14 March 1828, John Grant of Perthshire

== Second marriage ==
Bruce divorced Nisbet in either 1807 or 1808, and she went on to marry Robert Ferguson of Raith (1769–1840) with whom she was accused of committing adultery.

== In fiction ==
- Stealing Athena by Karen Essex (2008)
- The Elgin Conspiracy by Julia Golding (2024)
