= Requiem (Young novel) =

2008 novel by Robyn Young

- Author: Robyn Young
- Language: English
- Series: Brethren Trilogy
- Genre: Historical novel
- Publisher: Dutton
- Publication date: 2008
- Publication place: United Kingdom
- Media type: Print (Hardcover & Paperback)
- Preceded by: Crusade

Requiem is a novel by Robyn Young set during the end of the ninth and final crusade. It was first published by E.P. Dutton in 2008.

== Plot summary ==
Requiem, like Brethren and Crusade before it, follows Will Campbell, a Templar involved in a secret order known as the Anima Templi. After the Fall of Acre, Will returns to Europe to find out that his order agreed to help King Edward I to conquer Will's homeland, Scotland. Will decides to leave the Templars and fight together with his people against English invaders. But after his return to Paris he must face an even bigger danger, a plot that will lead to the end of the Knights Templar.

== Historical figures ==
The following characters in the book were real historical figures:

- Edward I of England: King of England from 1272 to 1307.
- Guillaume de Nogaret: councillor and keeper of the seal to Philip IV of France.
- Hugues de Pairaud: Visitor of the Knights Templar in France.
- Jacques de Molay: the last Grand Master of the Knights Templar, from 1292 to his death on stake in 1314.
- Joan I of Navarre: queen regnant of Navarre and queen consort of France, wife of king Philip IV of France.
- John de Warenne: 7th Earl of Surrey, appointed by Edward I of England the "warden of the kingdom and land of Scotland", one of the commanders at the Battle of Stirling Bridge and the Battle of Falkirk.
- Philip IV of France: King of France from 1285 to 1314.
- Pope Boniface VIII: Pope from 1294 to 1303.
- Pope Clement V (Bertrand de Got): Pope from 1305 to 1314.
- William Wallace: leader of a resistance during the Wars of Scottish Independence.

The following historical figures are mentioned in the book or involved with the plot, but do not appear as characters themselves:

- Louis IX of France: King of France from 1226 to 1270.
- Guillaume de Beaujeu: Grand Master of the Knights Templar from 1273 to 1291, mortally wounded during the siege of Acre.
- Thibaud Gaudin: Grand Commander of the Knights Templar under Guillaume de Beaujeu, then Grand Master of the Knights Templar from 1291 to 1292.

== Publication history ==
Requiem was first released in the United Kingdom in 2008. In United States and Canada it was released under the title The Fall of the Templars.

== Reception ==
The novel received a mixed response from reviewers, with most citing the story's disjointed nature and disparity with the rest of the trilogy as the novel's shortcomings.

John Washburn, in a mostly positive review for Myshelf.com, found that "this is a different novel but still quite good". In a similar review for The Daily Telegraph, Toby Clements stated that "Young's prose is fine, and the plot is satisfyingly complex, but in the end this book lives or dies on your attitude to the Templars, and in particular, the much romanticised William Wallace.". A. Jurek, of Curledup.com, was more critical of this concluding novel, stating that "Campbell's story essentially meanders through historical events such as the rebellion of William Wallace, sometimes drowning beneath the surface other story lines and events as he writhes purposelessly for many pages" and, with respect to the novel as a whole, opined "all this is a disappointment because Young can write better; in Crusade, she sets a time bomb ticking in the very first chapter, and the book is a thrill to read. I wish she had done the same in The Fall of the Templars."
