= Crusade (Young novel) =

2007 novel by Robyn Young

- First edition (US)
- Author: Robyn Young
- Cover artist: Richard Hasselberger
- Language: English
- Series: Brethren Trilogy
- Genre: Historical novel
- Publisher: Dutton (US); Hodder & Stoughton (UK)
- Publication date: 2 August 2007
- Publication place: United Kingdom
- Media type: Print (hardback & paperback)
- Pages: 489 pp (first edition)
- ISBN: 978-0-525-95016-5
- OCLC: 123391025
- Dewey Decimal: 813/.6 22
- LC Class: PS3625.O97 C78 2007
- Preceded by: Brethren
- Followed by: Requiem

Crusade is a novel by Robyn Young set during the end of the ninth and final crusade. It was first published by Dutton in 2007.

== Plot summary ==
Crusade, like Brethren before it, follows Will Campbell, a Templar involved in a secret order known as the Anima Templi, as he tries to secure peace in the Holy Land with the help of Kalawun, a high-ranking officer in the Mamluk court ruled by Sultan Baybars. Both of these men face plots from within their own organisations to throw the Holy Land into war: in Acre, Will must stop a cabal of merchants seeking to start a war by stealing the Muslim relic known as the Black Stone; while in Egypt, Baybars' son Baraka Khan and soothsayer Khadir al-Mihrani are plotting to overthrow Baybars and redouble the attack on the last remaining Franks in the Holy Land. Meanwhile, Will's childhood friend, Garin de Lyons, is now in the employ of King Edward I and has returned to Acre to extort money from the Anima Templi and to pursue his own, more selfish ends; and Will faces a threat from Baybars as the sultan gets nearer and nearer to discovering that it was Will who, many years before, ordered an assassination attempt which had failed but had taken the life of Baybars' closest friend.

== Historical Figures ==
The following characters in the book were real historical figures:

- Al-Ashraf Khalil: Son of Qalawun, sultan of Egypt and Syria from 1290 to 1293. Leader of the siege of Acre, which ended the Ninth Crusade.
- Balian of Ibelin, Lord Arsuf: Bailli of Acre under Hugh III of Cyprus, ousted by Charles d'Anjou in 1277.
- Baraka Khan: Son of Baybars and sultan of Egypt and Syria, briefly, from 1277 to 1279. In the book, he is the one responsible for his father's death, and was involved in a conspiracy with Khadir al-Mihrani and a Mamluk general to overthrow his father.
- Baybars Bundukdari: Mamluk commander, sultan of Egypt and Syria from 1260 to 1277. Dies under suspicious circumstances.
- Edward I of England: Prince, and then King, of England from 1272 to 1307.
- Hugues de Pairaud: Visitor of the Knights Templar in France.
- Kalawun Al–Alfi: Mamluk emir, high-ranking officer in Baybars' staff, sultan of Egypt and Syria from 1280 to 1290. In the book, he is secretly in contact with the Anima Templi, working behind Baybars' back to secure peace between the Mamluks and the Franks.
- Khadir al-Mihrani: Baybars' soothsayer. In the book, he is former member of the Hashshashin Order of the Assassins; in actuality, he was an Iraqi sheikh who fled to avoid being punished for sleeping with a nobleman's daughter. In Crusade he also is involved in a plot to overthrow Baybars, and is killed before he can accomplish his goals.
- Guillaume de Beaujeu: Grand Master of the Knights Templar from 1273 to 1291, mortally wounded during the siege of Acre. In the book, he was briefly involved with a cabal of merchants in Acre to start a war with the Mamluks, but becomes an honest commander again after the plan is thwarted fails.
- Jean de Villiers: Grand Master of the Order of St. John from 1284 to 1293.
- Roger de San Severino: Bailli of Acre under Charles d'Anjou.
- Thibaud Gaudin: Grand Commander of the Knights Templar under Guillaume de Beaujeu.

The following historical figures are mentioned in the book or involved with the plot, but do not appear as characters themselves:

- Abaga: Mongol il-khan, ruler of Persia, from 1265 to 1282.
- Charles d'Anjou: King of Sicily and Naples, later also king of Jerusalem after ousting Hugh III of Cyprus.
- Lucia of Tripoli: Last countess of Tripoli, until its fall at the hands of Kalawun in 1289.
- Louis IX of France: King of France from 1226 to 1270.
- Philip IV of France: King of France from 1285 to 1314.
- Pope Gregory X: Pope from 1271 to 1276.
- Pope Nicholas IV: Pope from 1288 to 1292.

== Publication history ==
Crusade was first released in United States and the United Kingdom in August 2007. Below is the release details for the first edition hardback and paperback copies in these publication regions.

- 2007, United States, Dutton Adult ISBN 978-0-525-95016-5, Pub date 2 August 2007, Hardback
- 2007, United Kingdom, Hodder & Stoughton ISBN 978-0-340-83972-0, Pub date 23 August 2007, Hardback
- 2007, United Kingdom, Hodder & Stoughton ISBN 978-0-340-83973-7, Pub date 1 September 2007, Trade paperback
- 2008, United Kingdom, Hodder Paperback ISBN 978-0-340-83974-4, Pub date 7 February 2008, Paperback
- 2008, United States, Plume ISBN 978-0-452-28960-4, Pub date 29 July 2008, Paperback

== Reception ==
The novel received a mostly positive reception from reviewers. In a positive review for on-line review site My Shelf, John Washburn stated that Young was "careful to maintain historical accuracy while at the same time bringing her characters to life in a brilliant manner". He claimed to be "mesmerized by the brutal emotion found in this book, much in the same way I was with the first book", and ended the review with: "I am more than pleased, and I eagerly anticipate the third installment". These sentiments were mirrored by A. Jurek, writing for Curled Up, who stated that "the plot moves swiftly despite complexities and complications exploding on each page"; she also praised Young's "use of dramatic irony" and, of the characters, stated that "they are complex, human, and deeply flawed, driven as they are by their flaws to commit unspeakable betrayals and barbarities for the sake of ideals, hoping to achieve some good with their questionable acts". In a mostly positive review for Reviewing the Evidence, Christine Zibas stated: "For those who are particularly interested in this historical time frame, Crusade is sure to pique their interest; for the more general reader, it may require a bit more slogging through the first part of the story to get truly involved in the book's characters and action".

Andre Delicata, writing for Malta's The Times was a little more critical of the novel, stating that the novel's problem is that "there is simply too much setting with meticulous descriptions where everything is dealt with in equal depth, resulting in a text with several climaxes and anti-climaxes but no real focus", and that without this "modulation of detail" the reader is simply left with an "information overload". Delicata also commented that "if the spirit of an age is what you're after, then look no further than Crusade, which captures it voluminously and thoroughly satisfies those with a passion of detail verging on the obsessive".
