= April Morning =

1961 novel by Howard Fast

- First edition
- Author: Howard Fast
- Cover artist: William Plummer
- Language: English
- Genre: Historical fiction, young adult
- Publisher: Crown Publishers
- Publication date: 1961
- Publication place: United States
- Media type: hardback, paperback
- Pages: 184

April Morning is a 1961 novel by Howard Fast about the coming of age of 15-year-old Adam Cooper during the Battles of Lexington and Concord. One critic notes that in the beginning of the novel he is "dressed down by his father, Moses, misunderstood by his mother, Sarah, and plagued by his brother, Levi." In the story's background are the peaceful people of Lexington, forced "to go into a way of war that they abhorred."

While the novel was not originally written as young adult fiction, it has often been assigned in middle school English and social studies classes, due to the age of the protagonist and Fast's meticulous efforts to recreate the texture of daily life in colonial America and the political currents on the eve of the American Revolution.

In 1988, April Morning was adapted into a made-for-TV movie starring Chad Lowe as Adam Cooper and Tommy Lee Jones as Moses Cooper.

== Plot ==
The novel begins in Lexington on the afternoon of April 18, 1775, when Moses Cooper sends Adam out to draw water from the well for his mother Sarah. Adam then goes upstairs to see his father's mother, Granny, who lives with them and is the only adult in the house to treat the teenage boy with kindness. The Cooper family members gather downstairs for supper. After saying a prayer, they enjoy a meal of bread pudding and "donkers". In the middle of supper, Moses confronts Adam about a superstitious incantation the boy had reportedly said while drawing water (Moses values reason and strongly disapproves of vestiges of superstition). This starts an argument between father and son, which is interrupted by the arrival of Cousin Simmons. He was chosen by the town to draft a statement on the rights of man—a subject on the minds of Massachusetts colonists restive under British rule. Simmons asks Moses to review what he has written. Another debate arises over the statement's characterization of rights as "God-given". Moses asserts that rights come from the people, not from God.

After supper and evening chores, Adam leaves for the Simmons' house to meet with their daughter Ruth, his love interest. They take a walk and speak about various things, including their futures and what they want to be in the world. After a kiss, Adam returns to his house. He spots his younger brother, Levi, cleaning his gun. He does not like this but Sarah insists that Levi can do it safely. Adam heads upstairs and goes to bed. He listens to his parents talk about a committee meeting where the townspeople discussed what the British might do in the face of increasing unrest in the American colonies.

Shortly after falling asleep, Adam is awakened by Levi, who draws his attention to the loud hoofbeats of a speedy horseback rider. The rider suddenly stops in the center of town. All the people of Lexington are awake and curious. They gather around the rider on the green. He informs them that a thousand-strong contingent of redcoat soldiers have landed in Boston and may soon be marching through their town. He then rides off. Because of this news, arguments stir in the crowd as to whether to muster the militia. The consensus is that a militia is needed. Adam signs up, but is first tasked with taking Ruth Simmons home. She expresses fears for his safety if a battle should erupt. When he reaches his house, he overhears Moses and Sarah reluctantly accept that Adam has entered manhood and must do his duty. Adam loads his gun, which only fires birdshot, and walks with his father to the green where the militia members, numbering less than a hundred, are assembling in the pre-dawn hours.

The men stand there until after sunrise when the redcoats march into Lexington. Moses and the town's Reverend attempt to speak peaceably with the British officers to avoid bloodshed, but the redcoat soldiers fix bayonets and fire upon the militia. Moses and several other men fall dead. Adam and the remaining militia members run away. He hides in a smokehouse until Levi discovers him. Levi warns his brother to leave town because the redcoats are conducting house-to-house searches. Adam slips out of the smokehouse, jumps over a wall, and meets Solomon Chandler, an elderly neighbor. Solomon consoles Adam who is distraught by the death of his father. They eat a meal together and Adam begins to compose himself. They walk toward Concord. They first meet Cousin Dover, Cousin Simmons, and the Reverend, and then arrive at a militia encampment with hundreds of men. Adam gives his account of the massacre that morning on the Lexington green. The militia leaders, urged on by the combative Solomon, decide to launch ambushes against the British soldiers from behind stone walls and other hiding places.

A militia rider scouts ahead while the rest of the men lie in wait. The rider returns to tell of the British whereabouts. The redcoats soon come marching down the road to Concord, and the militia surprise them with a fierce round of volleys. Many redcoat soldiers fall. Adam fires his gun, but believes his birdshot only wounds soldiers without killing them. The militia members flee over a nearby hill, to rest and plan the next ambush. During the ensuing encounter, Adam, who hardly slept the previous night, dozes off under some brush. He is later awakened by Cousin Simmons and the Reverend who have been searching for him and feared he was dead. He calls to them, to their relief, and they send him home. The redcoats meanwhile have suffered numerous casualties and retreated to Boston.

Adam is first greeted by Levi, who walks him into the house. Levi idolizes his "war hero" older brother, but Adam does not feel especially heroic. The Cooper's house is occupied by mourners along with Ruth, Granny, and Sarah. The latter sends him to get Moses a coffin and take it to the church. After a brief conversation with the coffin-maker, Adam returns to his house. He eats a large meal before Sarah sends him back to the church to light candles by Moses' coffin. Ruth accompanies him and they admit their love for each other as he escorts her home. Then he himself goes home and to bed.

== Themes ==
Of the major themes in the novel, "coming of age" is the one most commonly identified, but others have been noted. They include non-violence, the rights of man, and the nature of truth.

The first theme, coming of age, is expressed through Adam's rite-of-passage experiences at the Battle of Lexington where he sees his father and other townspeople killed by British soldiers. In the immediate aftermath of the morning massacre, Adam sobs and vomits from the horror at what he just witnessed. He gradually steadies himself and participates in the militia's ensuing ambushes. When he returns home, he is treated against his wishes as the man of the house.

The theme of non-violence is based on Moses Cooper's belief in solving problems through debate, rather than warfare. This theme is also supported by Adam's later saying to Ruth, "I don't hate anyone enough to want to kill him." The notion of the rights of man appears multiple times in Moses' speeches. Also, the colonists are drafting a statement on the rights of man to send to Boston.

For the truth theme, several incidents in the novel illustrate people's contradictory behavior regarding what is true, such as in the opening chapter when Moses denounces superstition, yet superstitiously birches Adam exactly seven times.

== Background ==
In a 2009 American Studies article, Neil York argues that Fast sought to incorporate his populist view of the revolution, specifically, that "the most important story lay with faceless, nameless common folk, heroes and heroines whose tales were forgotten if ever recorded, and, more often than not, were never recorded at all." In support of this point, The New York Times observed how Fast made an ordinary townsman like Solomon Chandler one of the principal instigators of the Battle of Concord.

== Reception ==
The novel received many positive reviews. Jeffrey Hunter commended Fast for his "mature vision" of the revolution." Marian Desrosiers agreed, saying that April Morning "[is] a well written work which knits together the events of the 19th of April 1775." Andrew Macdonald also praised Fast for "A virtually perfect relationship between literary character and research."

== Adaptations ==
The novel was adapted for the screen in a 1988 made-for-TV movie starring Chad Lowe as Adam Cooper and Tommy Lee Jones as Moses Cooper. The Hallmark Hall of Fame production was directed by Delbert Mann, with a screenplay by James Lee Barrett. Although the backdrop is the start of the American Revolution, the movie focuses more on Adam's journey to manhood and his contentious relationship with his parents.

== Publication information ==
April Morning, by Howard Fast. Originally published 1961. Mass Market Paperback: Bantam, 1983. ISBN 978-0-553-27322-9

== See also ==
- List of historical fiction by time period
- List of works set within one day
- List of films about the American Revolution
