= Portrait of Mary Nisbet =

1803 painting by François Gérard

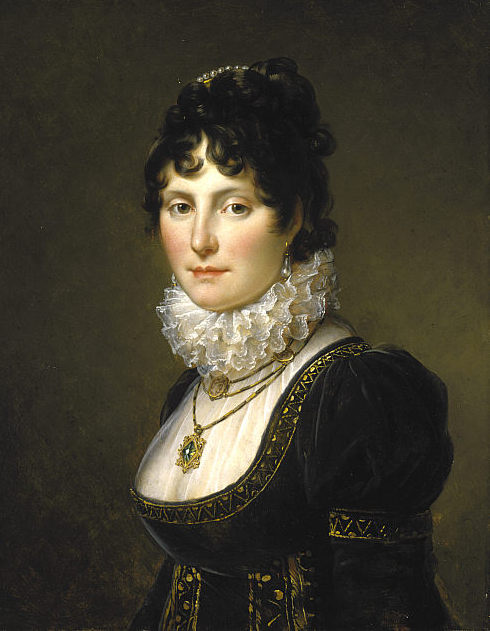
- Artist: François Gérard
- Year: 1803
- Type: Oil on canvas, portrait painting
- Dimensions: 64.8 cm × 54.6 cm (25.5 in × 21.5 in)
- Location: Scottish National Gallery, Edinburgh

Portrait of Mary Nisbet is an 1803 portrait painting by the French artist François Gérard depicting Mary Nisbet, then Countess of Elgin.

== History ==
It was likely painted in Paris after her husband Lord Elgin had been detained by the French authorities following the collapse of the Peace of Amiens and the outbreak of the Napoleonic Wars. She interceded on her husband's behalf with Napoleon, securing his eventual release under parole. She had previously accompanied him during his spell as British Ambassador to the Ottoman Empire when he had acquired the Elgin Marbles. They were divorced in 1808 when he accused her of adultery with Robert Ferguson, who she then married.

Today it is in the collection of the Scottish National Gallery in Edinburgh, having been acquired in 1921.

== Bibliography ==
- Cumming, Valerie. The Visual History of Costume Accessories. Costume & Fashion Press, 1998.
- Gere, Charlotte. The Art of Jewellery in Scotland. H.M. Stationery Office, 1991.
- Nagel, Susan. Mistress of the Elgin Marbles: A Biography of Mary Nisbet, Countess of Elgin. HarperCollins, 2004.
- Thompson, Colin, Brigstocke, Hugh & Thomson, Duncan. Pictures for Scotland: The National Gallery of Scotland and Its Collection, a Study of the Changing Attitude to Painting Since the 1820's. Trustees of the National Galleries of Scotland, 1972.
