= Reckless (Gross novel) =

Fourth solo-authored book by Andrew Gross

- Author: Andrew Gross
- Publisher: William Morrow an Imprint of HarperCollins
- Publication place: United States; United Kingdom
- Pages: 496
- ISBN: 978-0-06-165595-1
- Preceded by: Don't Look Twice
- Followed by: Eyes Wide Open

Reckless is the fourth solo-authored book by Andrew Gross. Reckless debuted on the NY Times Bestsellers list the week of May 23, 2010. Reckless is the third in his series with investigator Ty Hauck, hero of The Dark Tide and Don’t Look Twice. Hauck follows the threads of a brutal murder of a Connecticut family into a conspiracy that directly reflects the state of the world financial markets and the axiom of “too big to fail.”

== Setting ==
Reckless is set in circa 2009 Greenwich, Connecticut in the post Madoff era. The story portrays the financial industry in the aftermath of Great Recession and the subprime mortgage crisis.

== Story ==
Ty Hauck learns of the murder of a close personal friend April Glassman along with her husband Marc and their daughter. The murder was clearly meant to look like one of a recent string of home invasions, but very little about this murder parallels the other home invasions. The murder of Marc Glassman, a trader at a major brokerage, has an immediate and dramatic effect on world financial markets. Coincidentally, Glassman had gone out of his way to violate company policy, having dramatically over leveraged his positions. His murder brings down one of Wall Street's oldest and most respected brokerages.

Hauck has started a new job with Talon, a security firm whose largest client is Reynolds Ried, “a Wall Street icon.” Merrill Simons, the ex-wife of Reynolds Rieds' CEO, hires Hauck to check up on her suspicions about her new love interest Dani Thibault. As Hauck investigates Thibault he begins to see clues that connect Thibault to the murder of Marc Glassman and the apparent suicide of James Donovan, another over extended trader from a different firm.

In Washington, Treasury agent Naomi Blum watches millions of dollars in suspicious bank transfers. Her research leads her to follow the same trail as Hauck.

Hauck and Blum team up to unravel evidence that all connects back to Dani Thibault. Their search takes them to Serbia and leads back to London to find Marty al-Bashir, the chief investment officer of the Royal Saudi Partnership. As witnesses are quickly silenced in a string of murders, the trail leads all the way back to the Secretary of the Treasury in Washington and Peter Simons, the CEO of Reynold's Reid.
