= The Last Kabbalist of Lisbon =

1996 novel by Richard Zimler

The Last Kabbalist of Lisbon is a novel by American-Portuguese author Richard Zimler. It was first published in Portuguese translation in 1996 after having been rejected by many American publishers. After reaching No. 1 on the Portuguese bestseller list, the book found success in other countries and has been a bestseller in 13, including the United States, the United Kingdom, Italy, Brazil and Australia. It has been published in 23 languages.

Based closely on the events of the Lisbon massacre of 1506, The Last Kabbalist of Lisbon is a locked-room mystery crossed with historical fiction about a pogrom of Portuguese Jews.

== Plot ==
The novel is narrated by Berekiah Zarco, a 20-year-old kabbalist and manuscript illuminator. During the clandestine Passover celebrations held by the secret Jews of Lisbon, an anti-Semitic pogrom breaks out and Berekiah returns home to find the door to the family cellar (and secret synagogue) locked. Inside, he discovers the naked and bloody body of his Uncle Abraham, his spiritual master. Berekiah endeavors to identify the murderer with the help of his Islamic friend and soul-mate Farid, although, as a kabbalist interested in the symbolic nature of the world, he grows more interested in learning the underlying meaning of his uncle’s murder for his family, the Jews of Lisbon and all humanity – and even for God.

Berekiah's family lives in one of Lisbon's oldest quarters, the Alfama, and much of the action of the book takes place there.

One of the novels key themes is self-sacrifice in Jewish law, known as mesirat nefesh in Hebrew.

== Sequel ==
Zimler has published six other novels about different branches and generations of the Zarco family: Hunting Midnight, Guardian of the Dawn, The Seventh Gate, The Incandescent Threads and a two-volume work The Village of Vanished Souls (as yet, published only in Portugal). The seven books constitute the author’s Sephardic Cycle. They are meant to be read in any order. These works explore such themes as Jewish mysticism; slavery; how our identities change over time; the devastating effect of the Inquisition on Portugal and its colonies; and the psychological conflict created in people who are forced to hide their faith. Two of the novels in the Sephardic Cycle have been nominated for the International Dublin Literary Award: Hunting Midnight and The Seventh Gate. The Incandescent Threads was a finalist for one of the National Jewish Book Awards in 2022. All seven books were Number 1 bestsellers in Portugal.
