= Memnon (novel) =

Book by Scott Oden

- Author: Scott Oden
- Publisher: Medallion Press
- Publication date: August 1, 2006
- ISBN: 978-1-932815-39-9

Memnon, American author Scott Oden's second novel, tells the story of Memnon of Rhodes and his role in opposing Alexander the Great's conquest of Persia. This novel was first published on August 1, 2006, by Medallion Press.
