= James Reasoner =

American writer (born 1953)

James Reasoner (born June 5, 1953) is an American writer. He is the author of more than 350 novels and many short stories in a career spanning more than thirty years. Reasoner has used at least nineteen pseudonyms, in addition to his own name: Jim Austin; Peter Danielson; Terrance Duncan; Tom Early; Wesley Ellis; Tabor Evans; Jake Foster; William Grant; Matthew Hart; Livia James; Mike Jameson; Justin Ladd; Jake Logan; Hank Mitchum; Lee Morgan; J. L. Reasoner (with his wife); Dana Fuller Ross; Adam Rutledge; and Jon Sharpe. Since most of Reasoner's books were written as part of various existing Western fiction series, many of his pseudonyms were publishing "house" names that may have been used by other authors who contributed to those series.

== Life ==
Reasoner was born in Fort Worth, Texas. He moved to the town of Azle, Texas when he was two weeks old and still resides there. He attended North Texas State University. He married his wife Livia Washburn in 1976, and they had two daughters. His wife also became a fiction writer of some distinction and has written more than 25 books, including several co-written with Reasoner. Early in his career, Reasoner did freelance work for newspapers. For several years, he and his wife owned two local bookstores. His first novel, Texas Wind, which is one of his few mysteries, was published in 1980.

== Literary focus ==
Reasoner's primary focus over the years has been on fictional stories of the old west, with more than 100 of his novels having been in this genre. However, he has also written some well regarded historical fiction on earlier periods of American history including the American Civil War; early frontier pioneering after the Lewis and Clark Expedition; and the American Revolution. Much of his work has involved series novels typically with continuing characters, although he has written several stand-alone novels as well.

A majority of his western novels were written for the established western fictional series of several publishing houses that sometimes used other authors to work on these series, hence the use of "house" pseudonyms for these novels determined by the publisher. This body of his work includes his writing for Pocket Books (Abilene series); Jove (Longarm and Lone Star series); Signet Books (Trailsman series); and Bantam Books (Cody's Law series), among others. However, he also wrote two Western series with his own name (Wind River, Justice Stark), as well as several stand-alone western novels.

His ten book historical fiction series on Civil War battles followed the Brannon family through the war, as described in the separate Wikipedia article on the James Reasoner Civil War Series (see external link below). This series received favorable reviews, with one review describing his work as "robust, detail-rich, and well-paced."

Reasoner wrote six books in the 1990s as prequels to Noel Gerson's popular twenty-four book Wagons West series. These books provided fictional accounts of American frontier pioneering following the Lewis and Clark expedition in the early 1800s. The books were part of two trilogies, The Frontier Trilogy and The Empire Trilogy. They were written after Gerson's death in 1988, and Reasoner used the same pseudonym, Dana Fuller Ross, that Gerson had used for the earlier books.

== Partial bibliography ==
A partial listing of Reasoner's books follows:

The Civil War Battle Series, written as James Reasoner:

- Manassas (1999)
- Shiloh (1999)
- Antietam (2000)
- Chancellorsville (2000)
- Vicksburg (2001)
- Gettysburg (2001)
- Chickamauga (2002)
- Shenandoah (2002)
- Savannah (2003)
- Appomattox (2003)

The Wagons West Frontier Pioneering Prequels, written as Dana Fuller Ross:

- Westward (1992)
- Expedition (1993)
- Outpost (1993)
- Honor (1998)
- Vengeance (1999)
- Justice (1999)

The Wind River western fiction series, written as James Reasoner:

- Wind River (1994)
- Thunder Wagon (1994)
- Wolf Shadow (1994)
- Medicine Creek (1995)
- Dark Trail (1995)
- Judgment Day (1995)

Selected western series with multiple authors, with Reasoner using "house" pseudonym:

- Stagecoach Station series, seven books written as Hank Mitchum (1987–1991)
- Abilene series, fifteen books written as Justin Ladd (1988–1990)
- Cody's Law series, ten books written as Matthew Hart (1991–1995)
- Longarm series, forty-one books written as Tabor Evans (1993–2007)
- Trailsman series, twenty books written as Jon Sharpe (2002–2008)
