= James Reasoner Civil War Series =

The American Civil War Battle Series by author James Reasoner is a ten-volume series of historical novels about the American Civil War. The series centers on the fictional Brannon family, which resides in Culpeper, Virginia, a village and county in north central Virginia north of the Rapidan River that served as a major supply depot for the Confederate army. Each novel in Reasoner's series revolves around a Civil War major battle or campaign.

The series reaches its climax with Appomattox, the final installment.

The ten novels in series order:

1. Manassas, published by Cumberland House in spring, 1999. ISBN 1-58182-008-9.
2. Shiloh, published by Cumberland House in fall, 1999. ISBN 1-58182-248-0.
3. Antietam, published by Cumberland House in spring, 2000. ISBN 1-58182-275-8.
4. Chancellorsville, published by Cumberland House in fall, 2000. ISBN 1-58182-300-2.
5. Vicksburg, published by Cumberland House in spring, 2001. ISBN 1-58182-372-X.
6. Gettysburg, published by Cumberland House in fall, 2001. ISBN 1-58182-381-9.
7. Chickamauga, published by Cumberland House in spring, 2002. ISBN 1-58182-405-X.
8. Shenandoah, published by Cumberland House in fall, 2002. ISBN 1-58182-435-1.
9. Savannah, published by Cumberland House in spring, 2003. ISBN 1-58182-467-X.
10. Appomattox, published by Cumberland House in spring, 2003. ISBN 1-58182-513-7.

== The Brannon family ==
The Brannon family owns a farm in Culpeper County just outside the village of Culpeper. John Brannon has died as the first novel Manassas begins in January 1861. John was an avid fan of William Shakespeare. Matriarch Abigail Brannon oversees the farm with her six children, who have been named after William Shakespeare and characters from his plays. The Brannon children are William (Will), MacBeth (Mac), Titus, Cory, Henry, and Cordelia. The family is drawn into the events of the coming war.

== The War ==
Will, the Culpeper sheriff, enlists in the Confederate Army prior to the First Battle of Manassas. Mac later enlists in the Confederate Cavalry and serves under Generals Fitzhugh Lee and J.E.B. Stuart. Hard-drinking Titus and little brother Henry fight both the Union Army and each other (over a woman). Cordelia's initial love interest enlists in the Union Army. Cory drifts west and finds employment on a Mississippi river boat. Cory becomes marginally involved in the Battle of Shiloh and the Vicksburg Campaign. When the Union Army moves south later in the war, the Brannon family farm becomes a battlefield.

== Book 1 Manassas ==
The first book in the series begins with the oldest of the Brannon clan as Sheriff of the county. He and his deputy Luther Strawn are bent on bringing the Fogarty clan to justice. This coming with the Brannons already having a long running feud with the Fogartys. This leads to Luther Strawn's death, Henry (the youngest brother) being shot, the burning of the barn, and Abagail's disowning of Will. Will joins the newly formed Confederacy and fights in the first battle of Manassas.
