= The Last English King =

1997 novel by Julian Rathbone

- First edition
- Author: Julian Rathbone
- Language: English
- Genre: Historical novel
- Publisher: Little, Brown
- Publication date: 1997
- Publication place: United Kingdom
- Media type: Print (hardback & paperback)
- Pages: 381 pp
- ISBN: 0-316-64139-1
- OCLC: 38427719

The Last English King (1997) is a historical novel by English writer Julian Rathbone. The novel covers the time of the Battle of Hastings. It revolves around Walt Edwinson, a housecarl of Harold Godwinson, the last Anglo-Saxon king of England.

== Plot ==
The story starts with Walt returning to his home at Iwerne in Dorset four years after the Battle of Hastings. He had fled England after the defeat of the Anglo-Saxons and had spent the time travelling across Europe and Asia Minor. The story of his journey from Constantinople via Nicomedia and Nicaea to Side is then recounted in parallel with his recollections of the time before the battle, such as his accompanying Harold to William of Normandy's attack on Dinan.

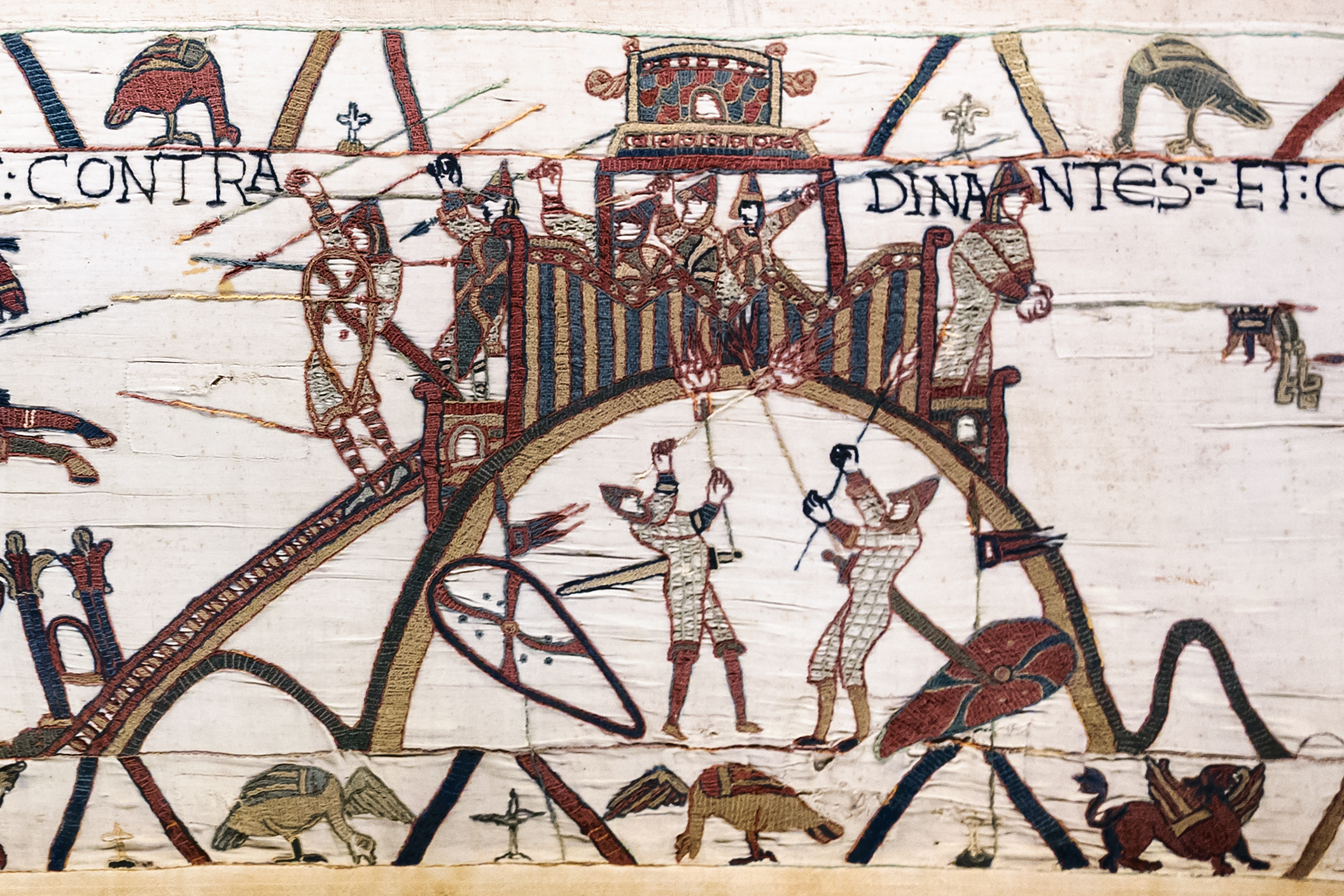
The Bayeux Tapestry: William of Normandy attacks Dinan

At the end of the novel the death of Harold is described. Rathbone has him buried in a shroud made from a banner depicting the "Fighting Man of Cerne".
