= Men of Bronze =

2005 novel by Scott Oden

- First edition cover
- Author: Scott Oden
- Publisher: Medallion Press
- Publication date: 2005
- ISBN: 978-1-932815-18-4

Men of Bronze is the 2005 historical novel debut of American author Scott Oden. It is an ancient Egyptian tale inspired by the writings of Herodotus and by Oden's love of the pulp-fiction tales of Robert E. Howard.

== Publication details ==
- First published: Medallion Press, Inc., United States, 2005.
- Also published in the UK by Transworld, Russia by Hemiro, Ltd., and the Czech Republic by Domino.
