= Robert Low (writer) =

Scottish journalist and writer (1949–2021)

- Born: 8 July 1949
- Died: 31 May 2021 (aged 71)
- Occupations: Novelist, journalist
- Writing career
- Language: English
- Genre: Historical fiction
- Notable work: Oathsworn series
- Website: robert-low.com

Robert Graham Low (8 July 1949 – 31 May 2021) was a Scottish journalist and writer of historical fiction. His Oathsworn series of novels were set in the Viking Age.

== Biography ==
Low was war correspondent in Vietnam and several other locations, including Sarajevo, Romania, and Kosovo, until "common-sense, age and the concerns of [his] wife and daughter prevailed". He wrote novels full-time and was a historical reenactor performing with the UK-based group, The Vikings.

== Books ==
=== Oathsworn Series ===
1. The Whale Road (2007)
2. The Wolf Sea (2008)
3. The White Raven (2009)
4. The Prow Beast (2010)
5. Crowbone (2012)
6. The Untold Tales of Little Crowbone (2012, short e-book only)

=== Kingdom Series ===
1. The Lion Wakes (2011)
2. The Lion at Bay (2012)
3. The Lion Rampant (2013)

=== Brothers of the Sands ===
1. Beasts Beyond The Wall (2019)
2. The Red Serpent (2019)
3. Beasts From The Dark (2020)

=== Border Reivers ===
1. A Dish of Spurs (2020)
2. Burning the Water (2020)
3. Shake Loose the Border (2021)
