= The Warsaw Anagrams =

2009 novel

First edition (publ. Corsair)

The Warsaw Anagrams is a 2009 novel by American-Portuguese author Richard Zimler. It has since come out in seven other languages: Portuguese, French, Polish, Dutch, Turkish, Italian and Spanish. It was a bestseller both in the UK and Italy. Set in the Warsaw Ghetto subsequent to the Nazi occupation of Poland, the novel is both a noir thriller and exploration of the day-to-day heroism evidenced by the Jewish residents.

In 2012, Zimler went on a book tour through Poland to speak with readers about the novel's subject matter. He wrote about his experiences for an American website, Talking Writing, in an article entitled “A Tale of Two Polands”.

The review in the San Francisco Chronicle cited Zimler's novel as “one of the most important works of Holocaust literature” and author Simon Sebag Montefiore wrote that it is “an unforgettable, poetical and original journey in to the mysteries of evil, decency and the human heart”.

== Plot ==
The Warsaw Anagrams is narrated by an elderly psychiatrist – Erik Cohen – who has recently died and who has remained in this world as a spirit or ibbur. In kabbalistic tradition, an ibbur remains in our world because he or she still has an important duty – a mitzvah – to fulfill. So Erik recounts the story of his last year in the Warsaw ghetto to the one visionary man who can see him and hear him in the hopes of discovering what he still must accomplish. The story he tells involves the murder of his beloved grand-nephew Adam, whose body was desecrated and left in the barbed wire surrounding the ghetto. Shortly after that horrific discovery, a young girl's body is left in similar circumstances, and, Erik – along with his best friend Izzy – are forced to become amateur sleuths. The evidence they uncover begins to point to a Jewish traitor luring children to their death.
