= Winter of the World =

2012 novel by Ken Follett

- First edition (UK)
- Author: Ken Follett
- Language: English
- Series: Century Trilogy
- Genre: Historical fiction
- Publisher: Macmillan (UK); Dutton Penguin (US)
- Publication date: 18 September 2012
- Publication place: United Kingdom
- Media type: Print (Hardback), Ebook
- Pages: 940 (Hardcover, US edition)
- ISBN: 978-0-525-95292-3
- Preceded by: Fall of Giants
- Followed by: Edge of Eternity

Winter of the World is a historical novel written by the Welsh-born author Ken Follett, published in 2012. It is the second book in the Century Trilogy. Revolving about a family saga that covers the interrelated experiences of American, Russian, German and British families during the 20th century, the novel follows the second generation of those families, born to the main characters of the first novel, Fall of Giants, and is followed by a further generation of those families in the third and final book in the series, Edge of Eternity.

The story starts in 1933, with the Nazi seizure of power, includes World War II, and concludes in 1949 in the early stages of the Cold War.

== Plot summary ==
The story follows characters from Germany, Britain, the United States and the Soviet Union, who become linked by events leading to World War II, and continues through the war and its immediate aftermath. The major characters are often children of the characters who were seen in Fall of Giants. The novel covers a wide range of world events during the period, including the rise of Nazism, the ascent of Franco in Spain, the short-lived growth of British fascism, Action T4, the Battle of Moscow, the Blitz, the Normandy landings, the attack on Pearl Harbor, the development of the American atom bomb and the Soviet one, the Battle of Berlin and many more. The families, spread across four countries, are related to each other, though they themselves are not often aware of it.

Point of view characters include:

Carla von Ulrich - the daughter of Reichstag member Walter von Ulrich and magazine editor Lady Maud Fitzherbert - English aristocrat who had fallen in love with the German nobleman Walter just before WWI and followed her heart against all odds. She was rejected for a medical scholarship due to the anti-female policies in Nazi Germany, but takes a job as a nurse in Berlin. After her father is murdered by the Gestapo for protesting Action T4, she helps her friends- who are German Resistance members- transmit vital battle plans to the Soviet Union. During the Battle of Berlin Carla witnesses a fourteen-year-old Jewish girl named Rebecca about to be raped by five Red Army soldiers, and in an act of self-sacrifice offers herself to be raped instead. Becoming pregnant, she decides to have the child, cherish and raise him with her husband, Werner Franck and her mother. She also adopts the girl Rebecca whom she saved. She becomes a Social Democrat Berlin City Councillor, involved in confronting the Soviets during the 1948 Blockade of Berlin.

Erik von Ulrich - Carla's older brother, he is much more narrow-minded and less liberal than his sister and parents. Erik is initially a firm supporter of the Nazi regime and serves in the German Army as a medical orderly in the invasions of France and Russia. However, when he witnesses the massacre of Jewish civilians by the SS' Einsatzgruppen, he has a change of heart. Captured during the Battle of Berlin, Erik later becomes a die-hard supporter of communism, much to his mother and sister's dismay.

Thomas Macke - a sadistic, ambitious member of the Gestapo. A fanatical Nazi, Macke gains ownership of a restaurant owned by Walter von Ulrich's cousin Robert by threatening to persecute Robert for his homosexuality. He later orders the murder of Carla and Erik's father and nearly manages to uncover the German Resistance circuit run by Carla and her boyfriend Werner. When Macke is injured during a bombing, Werner smothers him to death in the hospital where Carla works.

Lloyd Williams - the son of Welsh MP Ethel Leckwith and the bastard of Earl Fitzherbert (and therefore a cousin of Carla and Erik, whom he met in Berlin). Lloyd was a student at Cambridge University alongside his unknowing half-brother, Viscount 'Boy' Fitzherbert. After leading anti-Fascist demonstrations in London, he fights for the Republican forces in the Spanish Civil War and later helps downed Allied airmen escape German-occupied France during World War II. Lloyd falls in love with Daisy early in the story, though she doesn't reciprocate it until later. After the war, he becomes a Labour Party MP and supporter of the Marshall Plan to combat Soviet Union's communist expansionism.

Daisy Peshkov - the daughter of Russian-American film tycoon/gangster Lev Peshkov and Olga Vyalov, she is initially a superficial but kind natured social climber. When she is rejected by high society in her native Buffalo due to her father's reputation, she romances and later marries Viscount 'Boy' Fitzherbert in England. However, their relationship soon breaks down due to his infidelities and her growing attraction to Lloyd Williams. Daisy drives an ambulance during the Blitz and becomes close friends with Lloyd's mother Ethel. After Boy is killed when his plane is shot down, Daisy marries Lloyd and starts a family with him after the war.

Grigori "Greg" Peshkov - Daisy's half-brother, the son of Lev and his mistress Marga. A former student at Harvard, Greg is very much his father's son in his initiative, ambition and womanizing habits. He quickly rises amid the bureaucracy of Washington D.C. during World War II and becomes an observer for the government on the Manhattan Project, the development of the nuclear bomb. During World War II, Greg discovers he has a son, Georgy, conceived during his earlier romance with a young African-American actress, Jacky Jakes. He provides for the child's upbringing and education, becoming deeply attached to Georgy - which might create an impediment to his plans to embark on a political career in the Republican Party.

Vladimir "Volodya" Peshkov- the son of Soviet General Grigori Peshkov and his wife Katerina, although Vladimir's biological father is Grigori's brother Lev (who left Russia before he was born). An intelligence officer for the Red Army, Vladimir is the handler for several Soviet espionage cells in Germany and the U.S., including that of Carla and Werner. He fights in the Spanish Civil War and in the Battle of Moscow, and later manages to obtain covert intelligence on U.S. development of the nuclear bomb. Over time, Vladimir becomes increasingly uncertain in his devotion to communism as he witnesses the brutal and repressive measures taken by Stalin. Vladimir romances a beautiful physicist named Zoya, deeply involved in the Soviet Nuclear Program, and later marries and starts a family with her after the war.

Woody Dewar - The son of U.S. Senator Gus Dewar and his wife Rosa, and a former friend of Daisy and Greg's. Although drawn to politics like his father, Woody finds his true passion in news writing and photography. He spends much of the story trying to win the heart of his longtime crush, Joanne Rouzrokh, and eventually does. However, while they are in Hawaii celebrating their engagement, she is killed during the Japanese attack on Pearl Harbor. After his brother's death, Woody serves in the U.S. Army against the Germans, leading a paratroop platoon on D-Day. He is sent home wounded, and eventually begins a relationship with Bella Hernandez, a young Hispanic woman he met while training in Britain.

Charles "Chuck" Dewar- Woody's younger brother. Chuck is a patriotic member of the U.S. Navy, but struggles with his closeted homosexuality (which he later revealed to Woody, and which his mother had already guessed). Chuck is present during the attack on Pearl Harbor and later plays a small but vital role in the Battle of Midway. He is later killed by Japanese machine-gunfire during the landing at Bougainville, trying to protect his lover Eddie Parry.

The novel also sets the stage for the decades to follow with reference to interracial and homosexual relationships, the creation of the United Nations, the sexual revolution, and the growth of the communist Eastern Bloc. As in the series' first volume, during the course of the book, most female characters get pregnant and have children, who would become protagonists of the next volume.
