= Julian Rathbone =

English novelist

- Born: Julian Christopher Rathbone; 10 February 1935; Blackheath, London
- Died: 28 February 2008 (aged 73); Thorney Hill, Christchurch, Hampshire
- Occupation: Novelist
- Relatives: Basil Rathbone (great uncle)
- Writing career
- Period: 1967–2007

Julian Christopher Rathbone (10 February 1935 – 28 February 2008) was an English novelist.

== Life ==
Julian Rathbone was born in 1935 in Blackheath, south London. The son of Christopher and Decima Rathbone, he was a member of the Rathbone family. He attended Clayesmore School and Magdalene College, Cambridge, where he was a contemporary of Bamber Gascoigne. At Cambridge he took tutorials with FR Leavis, for whom, without having ever been what might be described as a 'Leavisite', he retained respect.

After university Rathbone lived in Turkey for three years, making a living by teaching English. While in Turkey he heard that his father had been killed in a road accident at the age of sixty, an event to which Rathbone would return when himself the same age, in Blame Hitler. On his return to England jobs in various London schools were followed by the post of Head of English at the comprehensive school in Bognor Regis, West Sussex.

Having originally aspired to be an actor or a painter, Rathbone had also taken up writing and by the end of the 1960s had had three novels published, all set in Turkey and informed by his knowledge of the country. In 1973 Rathbone gave up teaching and left for Spain with the woman who would become his wife and lifelong companion, determined to make his living by writing.

Back in England and after some financially lean years Rathbone found his tenacity beginning to pay off. Booker Prize short-listings in 1976 and 1979 brought critical recognition, and although major commercial success remained elusive Rathbone's work appeared regularly, gaining a loyal readership and increasing popularity both at home and abroad. His novels continued to display interests and talents across several genres, from mainstream through thrillers to historical fiction. His novel of 1066, The Last English King, published 1997, achieved considerable commercial success and has been optioned for film several times without having yet made it to the screen. As a writer of non-fiction Rathbone made a lasting and original contribution to Wellington and Peninsular War studies with his Wellington's War, 1984.

== Fiction ==
Rathbone wrote in different genres and "refused to be pigeonholed ... his output included crime novels, eco-thrillers, future fiction, film scripts and quirky historical narratives, and he also edited a fine non-fiction work about the Duke of Wellington".

== Characters ==
Rathbone created four characters who appear in more than one book, permitting a certain grouping, while never taking over the heterogeneous spirit of his work or deflecting him from the pursuit of wider fictional interests. First was Inspector Jan Argand (The Euro-Killers, Base Case, Watching The Detectives). Then the "Joseph" of Joseph (Booker nomination 1979) makes his reappearance as Charlie Boylan in A Very English Agent and later as Eddie Bosham in Birth of a Nation, as Rathbone follows the thread of events from the war in the Peninsula, through the world of German exiles taking refuge in early Victorian London and on to the early years of the modern USA. One of his possible descendants, Charlie Bosham, is the "hero" of Nasty, Very. Two books for Serpent's Tail, Accidents Will Happen and Brandenburg Concerto, focused on Renate Fechter, head of a German squad of Eco-police. Then Rathbone created a British private investigator, Chris Shovelin, for the two recent books Homage and As Bad As It Gets for Allison and Busby. Although diverse and strong characters, none of the four ever seemed likely to take over the oeuvre. Rathbone remained committed to diversity of inspiration rather than the formulaic approach to which concentration on a single character can lead.

== Influences ==
Rathbone never shared the cultural aridity of Leavis but he was a long-term presence in the novelist's background as a man who insisted on the power and importance of imaginative literature. In A Last Resort, written around the time of Leavis's death and giving a brilliant portrayal of a Britain making itself ripe for Thatcherism, the ferocious Cambridge don makes a brief appearance in the intellectual life of a gifted English student, at a school not unlike the one Rathbone had taught in until a few years previously.

As a writer, perhaps the nearest Rathbone came to an acknowledged antecedent was Graham Greene, whose weaving of the thriller and mainstream strands of fiction, together with the exploration of wider spiritual and political matters, often set in foreign locations, clearly struck many chords both with Rathbone's vocational subject-matter and belief in the novelist's ability to address human life on as broad a front as he likes, with the finished work of fiction as the only credential he needs. Greene remained an icon with Rathbone throughout his writing life, as did the different figure of James Joyce, object of Rathbone's greatest reverence, although rarely exercising any overt influence in his writing. A Last Resort is probably the most Joycean of Rathbone's books, in its use of accumulation of mundane detail to create an almost surreal portrait of a country whose identity is dissolving in front of its face. To Joyce, Rathbone paid the ultimate compliment of constantly rereading without seeking to imitate.

In addition to Greene and Joyce, Rathbone acknowledged Raymond Chandler, Eric Ambler and Friedrich Durrenmatt as influences upon his writing.

== Politics ==
Rathbone was a man of what might be called the classic Left. After public school and Cambridge, three years in Turkey told him all he needed to know about poverty and the next decade and a half of teaching in British secondary schools, made him expert in the class system of his country. His politics were those of tolerance and libertarianism, with an innate distrust of self-serving hierarchies and a cynicism towards power-structures and their manipulation of the world, in particular the world of the helpless.

In his fiction, much influenced by Greene, he always made social and historical context part of the weave of the narrative. Twenty years ago, in Zdt and The Pandora Option, he wrote on food as a new weapon in the armoury of the superpowers and in the early 1990s (Sand Blind), with the capacity of those same superpowers to fabricate wars in the interests of their technologies and consumer needs. In Trajectories (1998) he presents a nightmare vision of Britain in 2035, which seems more recognisable and likely with every year that passes.

Over a writing career of forty years, during which the world might be said to have changed out of recognition, it is notable how few of Rathbone's preoccupations and perceptions have dated, while many have been prescient and remain as relevant as they ever were. In his latest book The Mutiny, dealing with the Indian rising against British rule in 1857, the same commitment to clarity of vision is evident, an equal openness to all experiences and forces involved in the event, which continues unashamedly to put Rathbone in the line of the great novelists of the 19th century. The critic who took Rathbone to task, for appearing to claim a superiority of approach to the professional historian, in dealing with such contentious historical material, was raising a question which Rathbone's career, and The Mutiny, was dedicated to answering.

== Non-fiction ==
For a man of wide intellectual interests Rathbone produced relatively little outside his long list of novels. Much travelled, and loving foreign places, he always aspired to produce volumes of travel writing, but nothing in this direction ever came to fruition commercially. His one non-fictional publication was Wellington's War (1984), product of a fascination with Wellington which dated back to schooldays. Following within fifteen years of Elizabeth Longford's two-volume biography, which re-established Wellington as a subject for serious study, Rathbone's book is a radical and original departure from the normal run of biographical accounts. Based on detailed research into both Wellington's collected correspondence and the battlefields of the Peninsular War, it counterpoints extracts from the letters with Rathbone's own elucidations and comments. As well as uniquely conveying the immediacy of events through Wellington's thought-processes and human voice, Wellington's War does more than any other book on the subject to illustrate the dimension and brilliance of Wellington's genius. The Duke himself has a habit of cropping up in various of Rathbone's fictions, notably in Joseph and A Very English Agent and, more hauntingly, in Blame Hitler, the novel in which Rathbone writes about his own father. Rathbone described his own interest in Wellington as "probably Oedipal", and the Duke as "the ultimate father-figure". Wellington's War remains unique not only in Rathbone's own work but also in the growing contemporary literature on Wellington.

== Works ==
=== Co-Authored Non-Fiction Novel ===
- The Princess A Nun! (last third only – completing book by Hugh Ross Williamson): Michael Joseph, 1978

=== Series ===
==== Inspector Jan Argand Trilogy ====
1. The Euro-Killers: Michael Joseph, 1979
2. Base Case: Michael Joseph, 1981
3. Watching the Detectives: Michael Joseph, 1983

==== Renate Fechter Duology ====
1. Accidents Will Happen: Serpent's Tail, 1995
2. Brandenburg Concerto: Serpent's Tail, 1998

==== Chris Shovelin Duology ====
1. Homage: Allison and Busby, 2001
2. As Bad as it Gets: Allison and Busby, 2003

=== Standalone Novels ===
- Diamonds Bid: Michael Joseph, 1967
- Hand Out: Michael Joseph, 1968
- With My Knives I Know I'm Good: Michael Joseph, 1969
- Trip Trap: Michael Joseph, 1972
- Kill Cure: Michael Joseph, 1975
- Bloody Marvellous: Michael Joseph, 1975
- King Fisher Lives: Michael Joseph, 1976 (Shortlisted for Booker Prize, 1976)
- ¡Carnival!: Michael Joseph, 1976
- A Raving Monarchist: Michael Joseph, 1977
- Joseph: Michael Joseph, 1979 (shortlisted for Booker Prize, 1979)
- A Last Resort: Michael Joseph, 1980
- A Spy of the Old School: Michael Joseph, 1982
- Nasty, Very : Michael Joseph, 1984
- Wellington's War: Michael Joseph, 1984
- Lying in State: Heinemann, 1985
- ZDT: Heinemann, 1986
- Greenfinger: Penguin, 1987
- The Crystal Contract: Heinemann, 1988
- The Pandora Option: Heinemann, 1990
- Dangerous Games: Heinemann, 1991
- Sand Blind: Serpent's Tail, 1993
- Intimacy: Victor Gollancz, 1995
- Blame Hitler: Victor Gollancz, 1997
- The Last English King: Little, Brown, 1997
- Trajectories: Victor Gollancz, 1998
- Kings of Albion: Little, Brown, 2000
- A Very English Agent: Little, Brown, 2002
- Birth of a Nation: Little, Brown, 2004
- The Mutiny: Little, Brown, 2007

=== Short Story Collections ===
- "Damned Spot" in Past Poisons: Headline, 1998
- The Indispensable Julian Rathbone: The Do-Not Press, 2003 - also contains essays
