= Scott Oden =

American writer (born 1967)

- Born: June 24, 1967 (age 59); Columbus, Indiana, U.S.
- Occupation: Novelist
- Spouse: Shannon Morris Oden
- Writing career
- Period: 2000–present
- Genre: Historical fiction
- Notable works: Men of Bronze, The Lion of Cairo

Scott Oden (born June 24, 1967) is an American writer best known for his historical novels set in Ancient Egypt and Ancient Greece. His work imitates the styles and themes of the 1930s pulps, most notably the historical fiction and fantasy of Texan author Robert E. Howard.

== Biography ==
Oden was born in Columbus, Indiana in 1967. He graduated from Albert P. Brewer High School in 1985 and attended John C. Calhoun State Community College in Decatur, Alabama, where he studied English and History. Oden began writing at the age of 14, and his first published work was a role-playing game called "Rogue Warrior" in 1986, illustrated by teen-aged Cully Hamner.

Oden published Men of Bronze in 2005. It was followed in 2006 by Memnon and in 2010 with The Lion of Cairo, which mixed pulp-style action and sorcery with Crusader politics in Fatimid Egypt.

In 2017, Oden published A Gathering of Ravens — the first in a projected trilogy of stand-alone novels featuring the savage orc Grimnir. The second book, Twilight of the Gods, appeared in 2020. The third book in the trilogy, The Doom of Odin was published in 2023.

The Garden

In 2025, Oden published "A Clockwork's Dreaming and Other Tales," a collection of whimsical stories detailing the adventures of various mice and other small creatures living in an enchanted French garden. The work represents a significant departure from his historical fiction and sword-and-sorcery, exploring themes of memory, connection, and the magic found in everyday life.

== Influences ==
Oden identifies his writing influences as J. R. R. Tolkien, H. P. Lovecraft, Robert E. Howard, Mary Renault, Harold Lamb, Karl Edward Wagner, and Steven Pressfield.

== Bibliography ==
=== Novels ===
- Men of Bronze (June 2005, Medallion Press, ISBN 978-1-932815-18-4)
- Memnon (August 2006, Medallion Press, ISBN 978-1-932815-39-9)
- The Lion of Cairo (December 2010, Thomas Dunne Books, ISBN 978-0-312-37293-4)
- A Gathering of Ravens (June 2017, Thomas Dunne Books)
- Twilight of the Gods (February 2020, St. Martin's Press)
- The Doom of Odin (December 2023, St. Martin's Press)
- A Clockwork's Dreaming and Other Tales (January 2025, Independently Published, ISBN 9798308229124)

=== Short stories ===
- "Theos Khthonios" (2011, in Lawyers in Hell)
- "Amarante: A Tale of Old Tharduin" (2012, self-published)
- "Sanctuary" (2012, self-published)
- ”Xenia in the Court of the Winds” (2017, in A Sea of Sorrow: A Novel of Odysseus)
- “A Shadow of Vengeance” (2019, serialized in Marvel's Savage Sword of Conan, issues #1-#12)
- “Conan Unconquered” (2019, included in Conan Unconquered Deluxe Edition from Funcom)
- "The White Lion" (2022, independently published)

=== Non-fiction ===
- “Introduction” (2011, Sword Woman and Other Historical Adventures by Robert E. Howard)
- “An Empire of Ghosts and Smoke” (2021, Robert E. Howard Changed My Life, edited by Jason M. Waltz)
