= The Gospel According to Lazarus =

2019 novel by Richard Zimler

First edition (publ. Peter Owen)

The Gospel According to Lazarus is a 2019 novel by Richard Zimler.

(The paperback, published in 2022, has the title: The Lost Gospel of Lazarus) The novel is set in the time of Jesus.

== Plot ==
The novel tells the story of Lazarus of Bethany from his own point of view. One of the author's goals was to return to Lazarus and Jesus their Judaism and, in consequence, both men are referred to by their Hebrew names: Yeshua ben Yosef and Eliezer ben Natan. The book presents Yeshua ben Yosef as an early Jewish mystic and explores the deep friendship between Eliezer and Yeshua, who - within the fictional setting - have been best friends since childhood.

== Reception ==
Reviewing Lazarus for The Guardian, novelist Peter Stanford called it "a brave and engaging novel... a page-turner. I simply had to keep going to the very end in order to know on earth what would happen." In her article in The Jewish Week, Sandee Brawarsky observed that "Zimler’s writing is richly detailed, his characters compelling. Even if readers know how this story will unfold, there are surprising turns in these pages." In his Tikkun review, Jacob Staub wrote that "Zimler is masterful at immersing his readers in the ambience and symbols of each period, in the alleyways and culinary scents of each of his settings, so that the human lessons he elicits are credible and grounded in the past. He views Jewish history as a sacred text".

== Antisemitic shunning ==
In June 2019 Zimler published an essay in The Guardian entitled, "I have never met antisemitism in Britain... until now." It explained how Zimler, a highly acclaimed, bestselling novelist, had been rejected for appearances by two cultural organizations after they inquired whether he "was Jewish." He concluded the essay by writing, "if you fail to be welcoming to Jewish writers and artists because you fear a backlash, then your cowardice makes it possible for the haters to have their way – to spread their irrational dislike of Jews and make shunning them seem acceptable. Is that really the 'new normal' you want for Great Britain?"

According to The Bookseller, a trade publication that covers the British publishing industry, both The Observer and The Guardian confirmed that the arts organizations had decided not to sponsor appearances by Zimler after confirming that he is Jewish. The organizations feared that they would suffer from a backlash if they sponsored a talk by a Jewish writer.
