= Richard Zimler =

American novelist (born 1956)

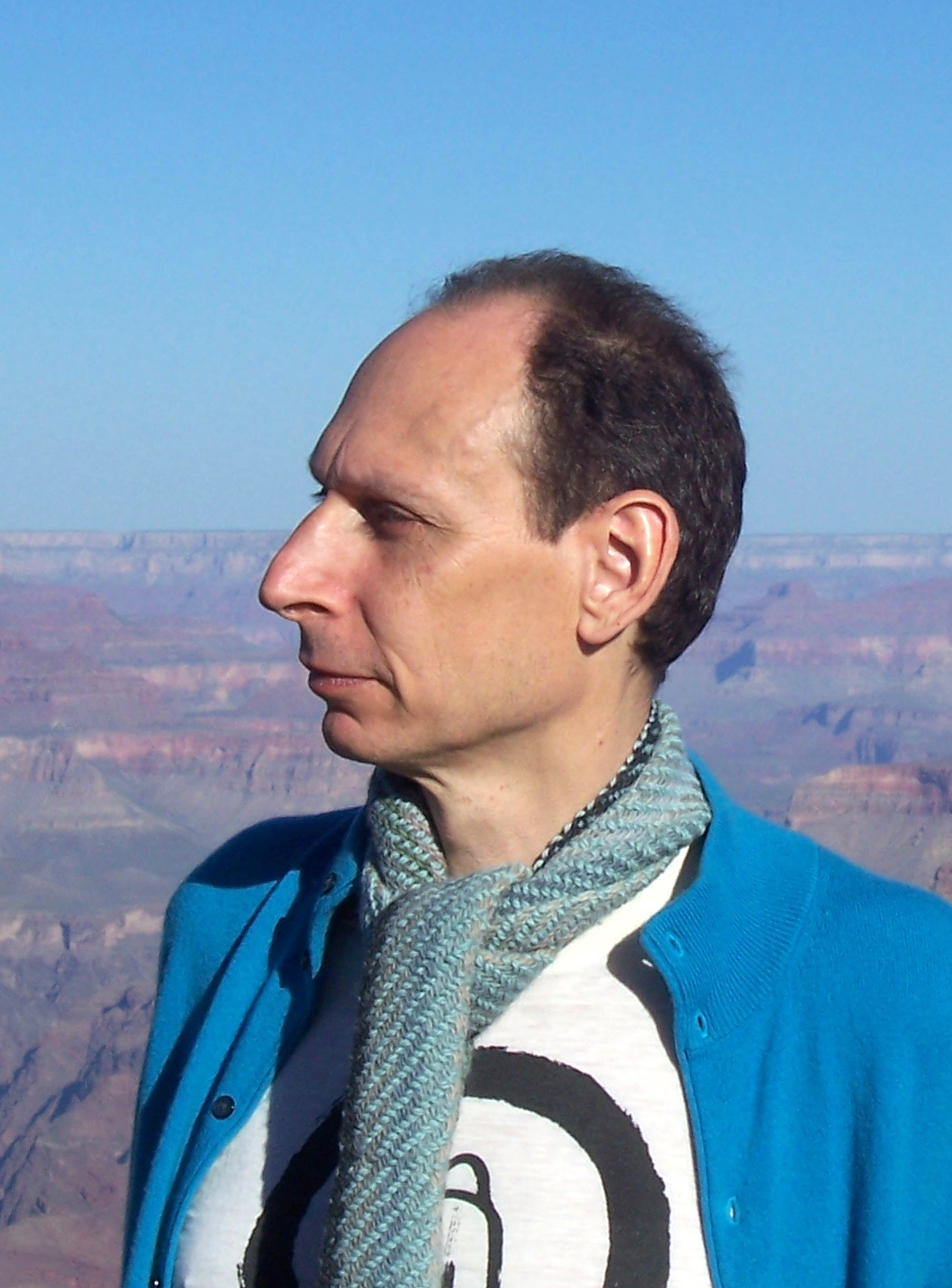
- Zimler at Grand Canyon in 2009
- Born: January 1, 1956 (age 70); Roslyn Heights, New York, U.S.
- Citizenship: United States; Portugal
- Education: Duke University; Stanford University
- Occupation: Novelist
- Spouse: Alexandre Quintanilha (m. 2010)
- Writing career
- Genre: Historical Fiction
- Website: www.zimler.com

Richard Zimler (born 1 January 1956) is an American author. His books, which have earned him a 1994 National Endowment of the Arts Fellowship in Fiction and the 1998 Herodotus Award, have been published in many countries and translated into more than 20 languages.

== Early life ==
Zimler graduated from Herricks High School in suburban New York in 1973. In 1977, he earned a bachelor's degree in Comparative Religion from Duke University and five years later obtained a master's degree in journalism from Stanford University.

== Academic career ==
He was a professor of journalism at the University of Porto and College of Journalism for 16 years. He retired from teaching in 2006.

== Awards ==
Richard Zimler's novel The Incandescent Threads was a finalist for one of the 2022 National Jewish Book Awards in the United States.

Zimler received the 2009 Alberto Benveniste literary prize in France for his novel Guardian of the Dawn. The prize is given to novels that have to do with Sephardic Jewish culture or history. It was awarded to him at a ceremony at the Sorbonne in January 2009.

Five of Zimler's novels - Hunting Midnight (2005), The Search for Sana (2007), The Seventh Gate (2009), The Warsaw Anagrams (2013) and The Night Watchman (2016) - have been nominated for the International Dublin Literary Award, the highest value literary prize in the English-speaking world.

His novel The Warsaw Anagrams was chosen as 2009 Book of the Year by the main Portuguese book magazine Ler and by the country's high school teachers and students (the 2010 Mariquis de Ouro prize). It was also chosen as one of the 20 Best Books of the Decade 2000–2009 by the country's foremost daily newspaper, Público. In August 2011, the San Francisco Chronicle described the book as follows: "Equal parts riveting, heartbreaking, inspiring and intelligent, this mystery set in the most infamous Jewish ghetto of World War II deserves a place among the most important works of Holocaust literature."

In 2009, Zimler wrote and acted in The Slow Mirror, a short movie based on one of his stories. Directed by Swedish-Portuguese filmmaker Solveig Nordlund, the short stars Portuguese actors Gracinda Nave and Marta Peneda. In May 2010, it won the Best Drama award from the New York Downtown Short Film Festival.

O Cão que Comia a Chuva, illustrated by the Portuguese artist Julio Pomar, won the prize for Best Children's Book of 2018 from the Bissaya Barreto Foundation of Portugal.

In July 2017, the city of Porto awarded Zimler its highest distinction, the Medal of Honor. At the ceremony, Porto mayor Rui Moreira described the novelist as "A citizen of Porto who was born far away, who makes Porto greater and grander... Zimler projects the city of Porto out into the world and brings the rest of the world to us."

== The Sephardic Cycle ==
Zimler has written seven novels that explore the lives of different generations and branches of a Portuguese-Jewish family, the Zarcos. This series, whose works are intended to be read in any order, originated with The Last Kabbalist of Lisbon, which is narrated by a youthful kabbalist named Berekiah Zarco who survives the Lisbon Massacre of 1506. These novels explore such themes as Jewish mysticism; slavery; the devastating effect of the Inquisition on Portugal and its colonies; and the psychological conflict created in people who are forced to hide their faith. The novels are independent works and, according to Zimler, none of them should be considered a sequel. The books that make up the Sephardic Cycle are: The Last Kabbalist of Lisbon, set in sixteenth century Portugal; Hunting Midnight, which takes place in Porto, London, New York and South Carolina in the early nineteenth century; Guardian of the Dawn, in which the main action takes place in Goa in the seventeenth century; The Seventh Gate, set in Nazi-controlled Berlin in the 1930s; and The Incandescent Threads, set mainly in New York and Montreal from 1970 to the present time but also with two long chapters that take place in Poland during and right after World War II. In its starred review, Publishers Weekly referred to The Incandescent Threads as "Exceptional... A richly drawn, original portrayal of tenacity and sacrifice." The most recent additions to this series of independent novels are the two books in the Vanished Souls Duology: The Village of Vanished Souls and The Upside-Down Forest. Two of the novels in the Sephardic Cycle have been nominated for the International Dublin Literary Award: Hunting Midnight and The Seventh Gate. All seven books were Number 1 bestsellers in Portugal.

== Other works ==
Zimler has also edited an anthology of short stories for which all the author's royalties go to Save the Children, the largest children's rights organization in the world. The anthology is entitled The Children's Hours. Participating authors include Margaret Atwood, Nadine Gordimer, André Brink, Markus Zusak, David Almond, Katherine Vaz, Alberto Manguel, Eva Hoffman, Junot Díaz, Uri Orlev and Ali Smith.

In August 2011, Zimler published his first book of poetry: Love's Voice: 72 Kabbalistic Haiku. The verses in the book express Jewish mystical ideas and imagery in the form of haiku.

Zimler has written five children's books that have been published in Portuguese: Maria e Danilo e o Mágico Perdido, Dança Quando Chegares ao Fim, Hugo e Eu e as Mangas de Marte, Se Eu Fosse and O Cão que Comia a Chuva.

In December 2018, Portuguese singer-songwriter Pedro Abrunhosa released a new album featuring a duet with American singer-songwriter Lucinda Williams for which Zimler wrote the English version of the lyrics. The song is entitled Hold Me.

In 2019, Zimler published The Gospel According to Lazarus. Novelist Peter Stanford called it "a brave and engaging novel... a page-turner. I simply had to keep going to the very end in order to know on earth what would happen."

== Personal life ==
Zimler has lived with Portuguese scientist Alexandre Quintanilha since 1978, when they met in San Francisco, California, They were married in August 2010, when same-sex marriage was legalized in Portugal. He has lived in Porto, Portugal since 1990. In 2002, he became a naturalized Portuguese citizen.

In April 2019, Zimler wrote an article for The Observer describing how his brother's death from HIV/AIDS at a young age affected his writing and, in particular, the themes of The Gospel According to Lazarus.

In June 2019, Zimler wrote an op-ed article in The Observer asserting that, in March 2019, his publicist told him that two cultural organisations in Britain had lost interest in hosting an event with him to promote his new book when they learned he was Jewish. The publicist asked not to be named and that the organisations not be identified. According to Zimler, his publicist said that talks over hosting him were cut off over fears of anti-Israel protests. According to The Bookseller, a trade publication that covers the British publishing industry, both The Observer and The Guardian had checked and confirmed the account. One Jewish writer queried why no other Jewish author had reported a similar experience in the UK.

== Selected works (novels) ==
- The Incandescent Threads (2022)
- The Gospel According to Lazarus (2019) (The paperback, published in 2022, has the title The Lost Gospel of Lazarus)
- The Night Watchman (June 2014)
- The Warsaw Anagrams (February 2011)
- Teresa Island (published only in Portugal (2010) and Brazil (2012))
- The Seventh Gate (February 2007)
- The Search for Sana (June 2005)
- Guardian of the Dawn (February 2005)
- Hunting Midnight (July 2003)
- The Angelic Darkness (September 1998)
- The Last Kabbalist of Lisbon (April 1996)
- Unholy Ghosts (1996)
