= Guillaume de Beaujeu =

21st Grand Master of the Knights Templar

- Coat of arms of Guillaume de Beaujeu

21st Grand Master of the Knights Templar
- In office 1273–1291
- Preceded by: Thomas Bérard
- Succeeded by: Thibaud Gaudin

Personal details
- Born: c. 1230 Kingdom of France
- Died: 1291 (aged 60-61) Acre, Kingdom of Jerusalem

Military service
- Allegiance: Knights Templar
- Years of service: 1253–1291
- Battles/wars: Seventh Crusade; War of Saint Sabas; Siege of Acre †

Guillaume de Beaujeu, aka William of Beaujeu (c. 1230 – 1291) was the 21st Grand Master of the Knights Templar, from 1273 until his death during the siege of Acre in 1291. He was the last Grand Master to preside in Kingdom of Jerusalem.

== Biography ==
Guillaume was born around 1230, to be the youngest son of Guichard II of Beaujeu, Seigneur of Montpensier and Catherine, daughter of Guillaume VIII son of Dalfi d'Alvernha.

He joined the Knights Templar in 1253, where he probably participated in the Seventh Crusade. He later went to the Kingdom of Jerusalem by 1260 or 1261, then he was captured during an ambush in the region of Tiberias, but released shortly after along with John II of Beirut and John de Embriaco. He was also part of the War of Saint Sabas, which deeply divided the nobility of the Crusader States and military orders. Hence, Baibars, Mamluk Sultan of Egypt, took the opportunity to conquer many Christian fortresses including Beaufort Castle, and destroy the Principality of Antioch.

In 1271, he became commander of the Templars in Tripoli. Later on, he was appointed as Grand Master of the Knights Templar to succeed Thomas Bérard in 1273. During his tenure the new Mamluk Sultan, Qalawun, easily conquered Latakia, after an earthquake in March 1286, which was the only remaining port in the Principality of Antioch, followed by the County of Tripoli in 1289, which had ignored Beaujeu's warnings. In 1290, Qalawun marched on Acre, the capital of the remnant of the Kingdom of Jerusalem, but died in November before launching the attack. His son Al-Ashraf Khalil, however, decided to continue the campaign. Beaujeu led the defence of the city.

At one point during the siege, he dropped his sword and walked away from the walls. His knights remonstrated. Beaujeu replied: "Je ne m'enfuis pas; je suis mort. Voici le coup." ("I'm not running away; I am dead. Here is the blow.") He raised his arm to show the mortal wound he had received - an arrow had penetrated his mail under his armpit so that only the fletches were visible. Beaujeu died of his wound and the city fell to the Mamluks, signalling the end of Crusader occupation of the Holy Land.

== In fiction ==
- Guillaume de Beaujeu is one of the main characters of Robyn Young's book Crusade.
- Beaujeu is featured in Pierre Barbet's sci-fi book Croisade Stellaire [Stellar Crusade] (1974).

== See also ==
- Grand Masters of the Knights Templar
- Templar of Tyre, William's assistant and chronicler

== Bibliography ==
- Barber, Malcolm (2012). The New Knighthood: A History of the Order of the Temple. Cambridge: Cambridge University Press. ISBN 978-1107604735.
- Claverie, Pierre-Vincent (2005). L'ordre du Temple en Terre Sainte et' Chypre au XIIIe siécle. Sources et études de l'histoire de Chypre (in French). National Center for Scientific Research. ISBN 978-9-9630-8094-6.
- Demurger, Alain (2008). The Templars Must Die. Robinbook editions. ISBN 978-8479279899.
- Irwin, Robert (1986). The Middle East in the Middle Ages: the early Mamluk Sultanate. Southern Illinois University Press. pp. 1250–1382. ISBN 9780809312863.
- Murray, Alan V. (2006). The Crusades—An Encyclopedia. Vol. 4. ABC-CLIO. ISBN 1576078620.
- Richard, Jean (1996). Histoire des Croisades (in French). Fayard. ISBN 2-213-59787-1.
- Runciman, Steven (1994). The Sicilian Vespers: A History of the Mediterranean World in the Later Thirteenth Century. Cambridge University Press. ISBN 978-1-107-60474-2.
- Shagrir, Iris; Kedar, Benjamin Z.; Balard, Michel (2018). Communicating the Middle Ages. Essays in Honour of Sophia Menache. London and New York: Routledge. ISBN 978-1351655910.

Preceded by Thomas Bérard	Grand Master of the Knights Templar; 1273–1291	Succeeded by Thibaud Gaudin
