= Fall of Giants =

2010 historical novel by Ken Follett

- First edition cover
- Author: Ken Follett
- Language: English
- Series: Century Trilogy
- Genre: Historical Novel
- Publisher: Pan Macmillan
- Publication date: 28 September 2010
- Publication place: United Kingdom
- Media type: Print (paperback and hardcover) Ebook Audiobook.
- Pages: Hardcover, 1008 pp
- ISBN: 0-525-95165-2
- Followed by: Winter of the World

Fall of Giants is a 2010 historical novel by Welsh author Ken Follett. It is the first part of the Century Trilogy which follows five interrelated families throughout the course of the 20th century. The first book covers notable events such as World War I, the Russian Revolution, and the struggle for women's suffrage. The sequel Winter of the World covers World War II and was published on September 18, 2012. The third book, Edge of Eternity, covers the Cold War and was published in 2014.

== Plot summary ==
The novel begins with the thirteen-year-old Billy Williams (nicknamed "Billy-with-Jesus") going to his first day of work in the coal mine underneath the fictional Welsh town of Aberowen in 1911.

Three years later, the main story begins. Edward "Fitz" Fitzherbert, Earl Fitzherbert, who maintains a country estate in Aberowen and licenses the land on which the coal mine is built, hosts a party for many powerful people around the world. The party is partially organised and co-ordinated by his temporary housekeeper, Ethel Williams, the sister of Billy. His guests include:

- Lady Maud Fitzherbert, Fitz's sister, who is far more liberal than her conservative brother.
- Walter von Ulrich, a German nobleman and former schoolmate of Fitz's. He and Maud begin acting on their years-long shared attraction during the party.
- Graf ("Count") Robert von Ulrich, Walter's Austrian homosexual cousin.
- Gus Dewar, a highly-educated American and close advisor to President Woodrow Wilson.
- Bea Fitzherbert, Fitz's wife, a Russian princess.
- King George V, King of the British Empire.
- Mary of Teck, wife of King George V.

Major characters introduced after the party include Grigori and Lev Peshkov, two Russian orphans who work in a locomotive factory and have personal reasons to hold a grudge against Princess Bea and the rest of the Russian royal family. Grigori and Lev's father was executed by Bea's aristocratic family for alleged improper grazing of cattle on her family's land.

The overall theme of the novel revolves around common people trying, often successfully, to throw off the yokes so often placed on them by societies (especially Britain and Russia) dominated by the landed aristocracy.

There are several key themes linking facets in contemporary world history. They include the causes of the First World War, the collapse of the Russian Empire, Germany’s role in the war that ultimately led to its economic collapse, as well as the postwar rise of Hitler.

Regarding Russian history, Follett portrays Lenin's role in the rise of the Bolsheviks as a ploy of the German intelligence service to divide and conquer Russian resistance. He does not clearly explain the rise of Stalin following Lenin's death. This may be better explained in the second volume—he does this at about page 500 of volume 2, which seems to understate the role of Stalin in Europe and American history.

Throughout the novel, several chapters are devoted to the rise of women's rights in Britain and role of the Labour Party in promoting issues affecting worker safety following a mining accident in Wales.

Through these chapters, Follett displays the considerable differences in social status of the miners and the owners of the mines in quality of life, health, and education. He describes the conditions experienced by soldiers in the trenches of the Western Front, including encounters with poison gas, unsuccessful charges against artillery, and machine gun posts, as the war persists. Thousands lose their lives while industrial interests on both sides see benefits from increased factory production; the deceased are repatriated to England.

The book delves into the background of Germany at the time, examining the costs of its efforts during World War I and the subsequent economic devastation under the Treaty of Versailles, which later influenced Adolf Hitler's motivations for seeking revenge.

Throughout the narrative, the characters and their extended families experience fluctuating fortunes, influenced by both their interactions with each other and the impacts of the First World War.

During the course of the story, nearly all female characters become pregnant—whether married or not—and give birth to one or two children. These children will reach adolescence in the 1930s and become young adults during the Second World War, serving as the main characters in the series' second book.

== Critical reception ==
The book received generally positive reviews, lauding the extensive historical research that has been intertwined into the narrative.
