= Insurrection (Young novel) =

2010 novel by Robyn Young

- Author: Robyn Young
- Language: English
- Series: Insurrection trilogy
- Genre: Historical fiction
- Publisher: Hodder and Stoughton
- Publication date: 14 October 2010
- Publication place: United Kingdom
- Media type: Print, E-book
- Pages: 512
- ISBN: 978-0-340-96364-7
- Followed by: Renegade (2012)

Insurrection is the first novel in Robyn Young's Insurrection trilogy, her fourth book overall, published on 14 October 2010 through Hodder and Stoughton. The story is based on the exploits of the historical Robert the Bruce.

== Plot ==
The novel is based around the Scottish Wars of Independence and in particular the actions of Robert the Bruce, set in the late 13th and early 14th centuries.

== Reception ==
Insurrection was well received, with reviewers praising the novels successful evocation of this little-documented period of the Middle Ages.

Toby Clements, in a review for The Daily Telegraph, stated that the novel is "immaculately researched and carefully written, evoking a very particular – and largely unexplored – time and place." and also commented that "the fights are sensational, too.". Mark Scala, reviewing for Australia's The Daily Telegraph, commented that "this tale captures the struggles of a tumultuous time.".

Scott Wilson, of on-line review site The Fringe Magazine was more critical than most, citing the novels factual inaccuracies as a possible point of contention for readers. He states that "those who like their historical fiction to be 100% factual will find many points to complain about" and comments that his wife "likes historical fiction and could not get into this book because of this". Tempering that, however, Wilson states that the book is "well-paced, with visceral and believable battles scenes".
