= Brethren (novel) =

2006 novel by Robyn Young

- Brethren first edition cover.
- Author: Robyn Young
- Cover artist: Larry Rostant
- Language: English
- Series: Brethren Trilogy
- Genre: Historical novel
- Publisher: Hodder and Stoughton
- Publication date: 24 August 2006
- Publication place: United Kingdom
- Media type: Print (hardback & paperback)
- Pages: 512 pp (first edition)
- ISBN: 0-340-83969-4
- OCLC: 65764910
- Followed by: Crusade

Brethren is a novel written by Robyn Young set in the ninth and last crusade. It was published by Hodder and Stoughton in 2006. It took her seven years to write the novel where she was "intrigued by the idea of these medieval warrior monks".

== Plot ==
The novel describes the fictional story of a young teenager by the name of William Campbell who starts out as a sergeant and later is promoted to a full Knight Templar. He is tasked with the search of the Book of the Grail which, if ever in the wrong hands, could potentially result in the downfall of not only the Anima Templi (a secret order within the Temple), but also the Temple itself. However, Will finds he's not alone in the search of the book. There are also Prince Edward and The Order of the St John's or the Hospitallers who want the Book as part of their plans to bring down the Temple.

The story of Will Campbell runs parallel to that of Baybars Bundukdari, a slave who rose to become Sultan of the Mamluks motivated purely by his hatred of the Franks. In the earlier parts of the story, Will does not know that his father James Campbell is also part of the Anima Templi (or Brethren) and that there is a contact deep within Baybars' circle of trusted advisors who works with the Brethren to achieve long-lasting peace in the Holy Land and the reconciliation of the three dominant faiths of the West: Judaism, Christianity and Islam.

The book has a sequel written by the same author. Crusade follows Will as he becomes further entangled in the Brethren and Baybars.

== Historical Figures ==
The following characters in the book were real historical figures:

- Baraka Khan: Son of Baybars.
- Baybars Bundukdari: Mamluk commander, sultan of Egypt and Syria from 1260 to 1277.
- Edward I of England: Prince, and then King, of England from 1272 to 1307.
- Henry III of England: King of England from 1216 to 1272.
- Hugues de Pairaud: Templar; son of Humbert de Pairaud.
- Humbert de Pairaud: Visitor of the Knights Templar in France.
- Kalawun Al–Alfi: Mamluk emir, high-ranking officer in Baybars' staff. In the book, he is secretly in contact with the Anima Templi, working behind Baybars' back to secure peace between the Mamluks and the Franks
- Khadir al-Mihrani: Baybars' soothsayer. In the book, he is former member of the Hashshashin Order of the Assassins.
- Kutuz: Sultan of Egypt from 1259 to 1260.
- Louis IX of France: King of France from 1226 to 1270.

== Reception ==
The book received a mixed reception from reviewers. In a positive review, Publishers Weekly opined that the novel combines "rich historical detail, clever plotting and engaging characters" to "craft a historical thriller that will have readers turning pages and envisioning the sequel". John Washburn, of on-line review site My Shelf praised Young's "steely depictions" of the action in the novel; her "silky style"; and her "engaging story filled with mystery, romance, courage, abandonment and deception". Marie D. Jones, in a review for Curled Up commented that "you would think Young lived during the times she seems to grasp so well" and found the novel "an exciting read". Stephen Hubbard, writing for Book Reporter, praised Young's "perfectly crafted" characters, "the strength of her narrative" in a mainly positive review, stating: "The majesty, brutality and romanticism of that time are so beautifully painted on the page that it is often difficult to separate the fact from the fiction, and we as readers are dropped into the very center of history to experience the events from within". Hubbard did, however, comment that he felt the novel sometimes supplied an "overload of information", though "these moments are extremely few and easily can be forgiven considering the strength of the remainder of the work".

Eleanor Bukowsky of on-line reviewers Mostly Fiction, offered a more critical opinion of the novel. She stated that "although she has the history part down pat, Young is less skilled in creating three-dimensional and believable characters. Her villains are dastardly and her young heroes are callow and long-suffering." and felt that "the book meanders a bit and the finale takes a long time to play out". The novel was negatively reviewed by Boomtron, with the reviewer stating that the characters "sound awfully modern" and are "too aware of their history and that of other nations", given that "studying such matters was a luxury few could afford". In addition, the reviewer also criticised the novels levels of historical detail, stating that they found the "history lessons superfluous, out of character and quite annoying interruptions in the story". The review did end on a more positive note, however, with the reviewer saying that "Young has written an engaging story at one level or I wouldn’t have suffered through 600 pages of it" and praising Larry Rostant's cover art.
