= Andrew Gross =

American novelist (1952–2025)

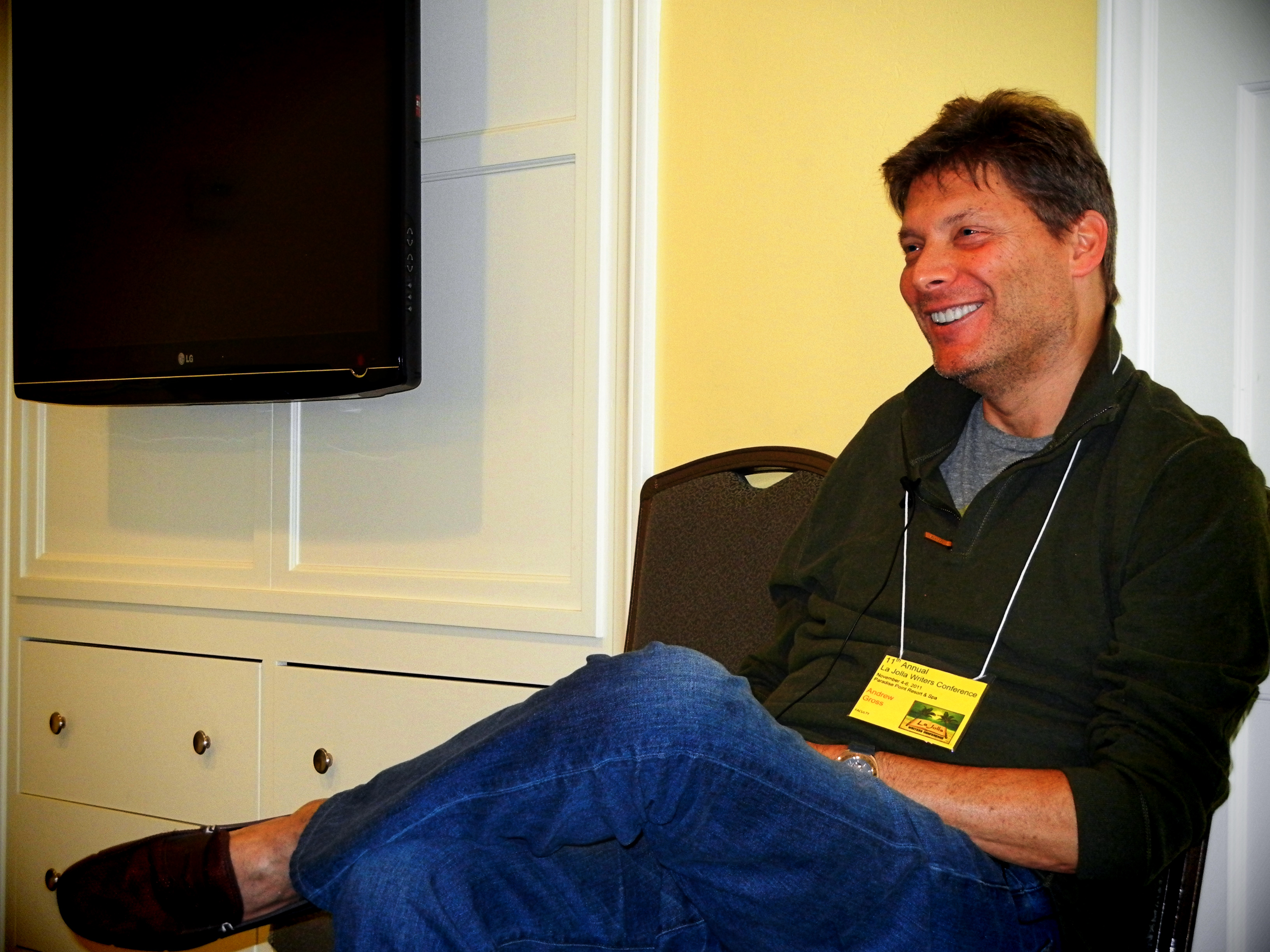
- Born: Howard Andrew Gross; May 18, 1952; New York City, U.S.
- Died: April 9, 2025 (aged 72); Purchase, New York, U.S.
- Education: Middlebury College; Columbia University
- Occupation: Author
- Writing career
- Period: 1990–2019
- Genre: Thriller
- Website: www.andrewgrossbooks.com

Howard Andrew Gross (May 18, 1952 – April 9, 2025) was an American author of thriller novels, including four New York Times bestsellers. He is best known for his collaborations with suspense writer James Patterson. Gross's books feature close family bonds, relationships characterized by loss or betrayal, and a large degree of emotional resonance which generally leads to wider crimes and cover-ups. The books have all been published by William Morrow, an imprint of HarperCollins.

== Early life and education ==
Andrew Gross was born in Manhattan, New York City on May 18, 1952. He grew up in there and attended the Barnard School for Boys. Both his father and his grandfather on his mother's side were successful clothing manufacturers; they ran the Leslie Fay Companies, named after his mother.

Gross received a degree in English from Middlebury College in 1974. In 1979, he met his wife, Lynn, on a blind date in New York City, and they married three years later. In 1982, he received a master's degree in Business Policy from Columbia University.

== Business career ==
After a two-year stint in Denver, where he worked as a dress buyer, he opened a stew-and-soup fast food pilot named Ebeneezer's. He eventually went back to work for his family's publicly held apparel firm, the Leslie Fay Companies.

In 1984, Gross took over Head NV Sportswear, the struggling arm of the iconic ski and tennis brand, and by 1989, had repositioned it into the number one upscale producer of tennis and ski apparel in the United States and a thriving brand in Europe as well, before leaving for a larger role at Leslie Fay (which then had close to a billion dollars in annual sales and was listed on the New York Stock Exchange). As Gross describes it, "sometimes the toughest thing about being in a family company is that it's filled with your own family", and in 1991, he left to pursue his own opportunities at Le Coq Sportif, a boutique tennis/golf brand, and Sun Ice, Inc., a Canadian skiwear manufacturer, the latter, "ending poorly and abruptly", as Gross says, "and hastening my writing career".

== Start in publishing ==
Gross attended the Writers Program at the University of Iowa. He took three years to finish a draft of his first book, Hydra (1998), a political thriller. He recalls: "after dozens of rejections from agents and ultimately publishers, not knowing what my next step in life was, and sitting around my study, wondering what cliff I was going to drive our SUV off of, I received a phone call from someone who asked, ‘Can you take a call from James Patterson?’" Gross met with Patterson and discussed the early concepts for what ultimately became the Women's Murder Club series. Patterson explained that the head of his publishing house had forwarded Gross's unpublished manuscript to him with the words scratched on the cover: "This guy does women well!" Patterson and Gross formed a partnership in less than a week.

Gross worked with Patterson on several books in this series, including Second Chance and Third Degree, both of which went to Number One. Then, they branched out on different themes together, co-authoring the bestsellers The Jester, Lifeguard and Judge and Jury.

== Solo career ==
In 2006, Gross left Patterson and pursued a solo writing career. In 2007, The Blue Zone debuted on the New York Times Best Seller list in the United States. A year later, it was followed up by The Dark Tide (2008), which the International Thriller Writers Association nominated Thriller of the Year. The Dark Tide featured the fictional detective Ty Hauck of Greenwich, Connecticut, who became the lead character in Gross's corruption and political conspiracy-based bestsellers Don't Look Twice and Reckless.

In 2011, Gross departed from Ty Hauck, writing Eyes Wide Open, which builds on two personal stories from his own past.

January 2014, Andrew decided to bring back Ty Hauck and started writing One Mile Under in 2015. He followed it with The One Man, a World War II thriller, in 2016. Kirkus called the book "Gross' best work yet".

Button Man is a 2018 novel about public corruption, extortion and labor racketeering menacing the New York City garment industry during the 1930s. The novel is partly based on the life of Gross's maternal grandfather, Fred P. Pomerantz (1901–86), a garment manufacturer who stood up to mobsters such as Lepke Buchalter, Jacob Shapiro and Emanuel Weiss.

== Later life and death ==
Gross died from bladder cancer in Purchase, New York, on April 9, 2025, at the age of 72.

== Published works ==
=== Collaborative ===
- The Jester (2003)
- 2nd Chance (2002)
- 3rd Degree (2004)
- Lifeguard (2005)
- Judge and Jury (2006)

=== Solo ===
- The Blue Zone (2007) (ISBN 978-0-06-114340-3)
- Eyes Wide Open (July 2011) (ISBN 978-0-06-165596-8); titled Killing Hour in UK/Australia/NZ
- 15 Seconds (April 2012) (ISBN 978-0-06-165597-5)
- No Way Back (April 2013) (ISBN 978-0-06-165598-2)
- Everything To Lose (March 2014) (ISBN 978-0-06-165600-2)
- The One Man (August 2016) (ISBN 978-1-250-07950-3)
- The Saboteur (August 2017) (ISBN 978-1-250-07951-0)
- Button Man/The Last Brother (September 2018) (ISBN 978-1-250-17998-2)
- The Fifth Column (September 2019) (ISBN 978-1-250-18000-1)

==== Ty Hauck series ====
- The Dark Tide (2008) (ISBN 978-0-06-114342-7)
- Don't Look Twice (2009) (ISBN 978-0-06-114344-1)
- Reckless (2010) (ISBN 978-0-06-165595-1)
- One Mile Under (2015) (ISBN 978-0-06-165599-9)
