= The Jester (novel) =

2003 novel by James Patterson and Andrew Gross

- Author: James Patterson, Andrew Gross
- Language: English
- Subject: France—History—Medieval period, 987-1515
- Genre: Historical fiction.
- Publisher: Little, Brown
- Publication date: 2003
- Publication place: United States
- Pages: 467
- ISBN: 0-316-60205-1
- OCLC: 51876003
- Website: http://www.jamespatterson.com/books/jester

The Jester is a historical thriller novel by James Patterson and Andrew Gross.

== Plot ==
Set in Europe in the year 1096, the novel focuses on a French man named Hugh De Luc. Hugh is living in a time of unrest when peasants like himself are treated poorly. The region is ruled by the tyrannical Duke Baldwin. In seeking freedom, Hugh joins the First Crusade. While invading one of the Turkish cities, Hugh realizes the horror around him and decides he cannot face it. He passes a church, where he sees a priest being beaten, and kills the men attacking him. At the dead priest's side lies a staff, which Hugh decides to carry with him from then on.

Hugh flees the Holy Land, returning to his home village of Veille du Père, only to find that his wife Sophie has been kidnapped, his son Phillipe (born after Hugh had left) is dead, and his inn is destroyed. Townsfolk inform him that the attackers wore no colors except for black crosses sewn onto their tunics and that the attackers were dishonored knights who seemed to be looking for Hugh particularly. Angered, he wanders into the forest, searching for Sophie, whom Hugh believes is still alive and being held captive in the dungeons at Treille. After being attacked by a boar, he is saved by Emilie, a woman who reminds him of Sophie. She turns out to be highborn — a daughter of the King of France — though he does not learn of this until much later. She takes care of him in her hometown of Borée, which is the dukedom of her cousin's husband, Stephen. Hugh's plan is to infiltrate the castle of Lord Baldwin at Treille. With the help of Emilie and Norbert, the jester at Borée, Hugh pretends to be a jester. Through Lord Baldwin and his court, Hugh learns that his wife was never in Treille with Baldwin, so he travels back to Borée to see Emilie once more.

Winning Emilie's cousin Anne's ear, Hugh eventually finds that Sophie was in the dungeon of Borée all along; Anne had been lying to him. Killing three of the Tafurs (Anne's guards, which turn out to be the dishonored knights who took his wife), Hugh runs back to Veille du Père. By then, he is sure that the men are hunting him, but he knows not for what. The Tafurs were a fearsome war band, with rumors circulating that they resorted to cannibalism, either deliberately or as a last resort. The Tafurs launch an attack on Veille du Père, but Hugh and his friends have prepared traps, and so manage to kill all but one. The last Tafur attacks Hugh before his escape, breaking his staff, revealing a hidden reliquary — the Holy Lance that pierced Jesus Christ's side as he hung on the cross. Peasants flock to the spear, so Hugh marches on Treille and takes Baldwin prisoner. Next, he marches on Borée. The leader of the Tafurs, "Black Cross", attacks Hugh but he and the rest of the Tafurs are defeated.

Stephen (Anne's evil husband who had recently returned from the Crusades), threatens to kill Emilie, but a plot by Hugh and Anne saves her. Stephen runs into the castle with Hugh in pursuit, and Anne kills Stephen with the Holy Lance.
