= Edge of Eternity (novel) =

2014 book by Ken Follett

- First edition
- Author: Ken Follett
- Language: English
- Series: Century Trilogy
- Genre: Historical fiction
- Publication date: 16 September 2014
- Publication place: United Kingdom
- Media type: Print (Hardback), Ebook
- ISBN: 978-0-230-71016-0
- Preceded by: Fall of Giants, Winter of the World

Edge of Eternity is a historical and family saga novel by Welsh-born author Ken Follett, published in 2014. It is the third book in the Century Trilogy, after Fall of Giants and Winter of the World.

The novel tells the story of the third generation of families developed in the first two novels and located in the United States, the United Kingdom, Germany and the Soviet Union during the height of the Cold War. The novel's characters become involved in a number of the most significant global events during the period, including the Cuban Missile Crisis, the British Invasion, the Kennedy Administration, the Watergate scandal, and the Civil Rights Movement.

== Plot summary ==
The story follows characters from Germany, Britain, the United States and the Soviet Union, who become linked by events from just before the construction of the Berlin wall in 1961 to that wall’s demise in 1989 (and in an epilogue to the night of Barack Obama’s election in 2008). Once again, the major characters are the children of the characters who were seen in the first two novels.

The novel covers a range of world events during the period, often from multiple points of view. These include the civil rights movement in the US, the Cuban Missile Crisis, the assassinations of President John F. Kennedy, Martin Luther King Jr. and Robert F. Kennedy, the Vietnam War, the Watergate scandal and the Solidarity movement in Poland.

The novel also covers a range of personal events. Others tour the world as reporters or aides to major political figures. Characters in the US work (under six presidents) to overcome prejudice and discrimination and to win the Cold War. Characters in East Berlin and Moscow work (under five different Soviet leaders), subtly at first and then more overtly, to bring about the start of the fall of Communism. And a family split apart by the construction of the Berlin wall is eventually re-united the night that wall comes down.

Unlike the first two volumes, which gave considerable attention to British politics and charted the rise of the British Labor Party to prominence, culminating with the party's victory under Clement Attlee in 1945, this subject is nearly absent from the present volume. In the course of the book's plot, most British characters move to the United States and become involved in its politics, rather than the British ones. For example, the 1979 elections victory of Margaret Thatcher gets no reference at all in the book, though it happened in the period covered by it.

== Characters ==
Here are the principal Point-of-view characters around which the plot revolves: (Note: For an exhaustive list of the cast of characters at the beginning of the novel, see the list on Follett's Website or in the preface of the novel.)

- George Jakes, a young half-black/half-Russian graduate of Harvard Law School working in the office of Robert F. Kennedy during the Kennedy Administration. He is the illegitimate son of Jacky Jakes and Senator Grigori "Greg" Peshkov.
- Rebecca Hoffman, a teacher in East Berlin, the adopted daughter of Carla von Ulrich and her husband Werner Franck. Originally married to Hans Hoffman, she discovers he is an undercover Stasi agent. Soon after the Berlin Wall is erected, she flees to the west with another schoolteacher, Bernd Held, whom she later marries.
- Walli Franck, Rebecca's musical younger brother who escapes East Germany to become an international rock star. He is forced to leave behind his pregnant girlfriend Karolin (also a singer). Karolin is then taken in by the Franck/Von Ulrich family.
- Lili Franck, Rebecca and Walli's youngest sister who protests the Communist government of East Germany by singing subversive songs.
- Dave Williams, the son of Lloyd Williams and Daisy Peshkov and grandson of Earl Fitzherbert; first cousin of George and second cousin of Walli, a dyslexic young musician who become an international rock star and music producer. He and Walli become the core of the band "Plum Nellie". He falls in love with Cameron's younger sister, Ursula "Beep" Dewar.
- Dmitri Dvorkin, a young apparatchik in the USSR working for Nikita Khrushchev as an aide during the Cuban Missile Crisis. The grandson of General Grigori Peshkov. Although he believes in Communism, he is disgusted with the inefficient and conservative leadership of the Soviet bureaucracy, especially after Khrushchev is deposed, and is constantly on the search for a reformist leader - eventually involved in helping Gorbachev rise to power.
- Tanya Dvorkin, Dmitri's twin sister, a journalist and star reporter for the official Soviet TASS news agency, publicly adhering to the official party line - while at the same time secretly writing and disseminating anti-Soviet articles and smuggling out forbidden writings for publication in the West - very dangerous activities, that could have dire consequences if discovered.
- Cameron Dewar, a conservative student at UC Berkeley who joins the Nixon Administration, and assists in Nixon's use of illegal espionage on political opponents. He later becomes a CIA agent stationed in Communist Poland.
- Jasper Murray, the son of Daisy's German-Scottish friend Eva Murray; an investigative journalist, he comes to America to report on the Civil Rights Movement but is then drafted to fight in the Vietnam War, where he participates in War Crimes committed by US troops.

== Genre and style ==
As a series of historical novels, the whole Century Trilogy revolves around an episodic treatment of history, highlighting the most significant events of the 20th century by immersing characters in those events. In doing so, Follett covers almost all of the major historical events between 1961 and 2008, the termination of the novel. Steve Novak of the Pittsburgh Post-Gazette described the novel as "an extremely extensive refresher course [in history]. This isn't just a few snapshots of history — this is a miniseries." Novak points to Follett's deliberate choices about representing the past that make the treatment of history successful; Novak quoting an interview in which Follett said "The research and effort at authenticity is more difficult when you're writing about history that is within living memory."

Despite this exhaustive treatment of history, most reviewers noted the quality of the reading experience. Novak describes the novel as better than a history book, by thrusting the reader into the "immediacy of the events described". The Historical Novel Society reviewer Viviane Crystal describes this skilled character development as what saves the novel from being "a skimming of the surface of history" is that the "set of characters [...] live and engage in all these events over the years, with romance, terror, frustration, determination, fury and celebration." As Steve Donoghue of Open Letters Monthly notes, however, this approach to the historical novel follows a conceit commonly used in historical fiction, saying its "oldest gimmick in the historical fiction bag of tricks, the eyewitness-to-history trick in which the author invents a character or cast of characters who just happen to be in the room when the great and the mighty eat, fornicate, and make the decisions that change the course of nations."

== Critical reception ==
Many critics focused on the tension between the novel's length and deep dive into history and the novel's compelling treatment of that history. Critic Steve Novak for the Pittsburgh Post-Gazette said that "Reading any 1,100-page book is a chore, but if you stay with “Edge of Eternity,” Mr. Follett’s characters just might grow on you." Publishers of Weekly described the novel as the "mesmerizing final installment is an exhaustive but rewarding reading experience dense in thematic heft, yet flowing with spicy, expertly paced melodrama, character-rich exploits, familial histrionics, and international intrigue."
