= Thibaud Gaudin =

Grand Master of the Knights Templar

22nd Grand Master of the Knights Templar
- In office 1291–1292
- Preceded by: Guillaume de Beaujeu
- Succeeded by: Jacques de Molay

Personal details
- Born: 1229?
- Died: 16 April 1292

Military service
- Allegiance: Knights Templar
- Years of service: before 1260–1292
- Rank: Grand Master (1291–1292)
- Battles/wars: Siege of Acre

Thibaud Gaudin (1229? – April 16, 1292) was the Grand Master of the Knights Templar from August 1291 until his death in April 1292.

== Life ==
The history of Thibaud Gaudin within the Order is rather mysterious. Born to a noble family in the area of Chartres or Blois, France, he entered the Knights Templar well before 1260 because, on that date, he was taken prisoner during an attack on Tiberias. His great piety was deemed worthy of the nickname of "Gaudin Monk".

In 1279, Sir Thibaud fulfilled the function of "Commander of the Land of Jerusalem", the fourth most important function in the Templar hierarchy. In 1291, he rode at the side of Guillaume de Beaujeu to defend the town of Acre, besieged by the formidable army of Mamluk Sultan Al-Ashraf Khalil. On 18 May, upon the death of Guillaume de Beaujeu, Gaudin remained in the city of Acre. The remaining knights of the order, men, women, and children, found shelter in the Temple, the great fort of the Templars. Pierre de Severy, Marshal of the Order, Thibaud Gaudin, treasurer of the order, and their knights were the last to defend Acre. After trying to break in for a whole week without success, Al-Ashraf Khalil offered the marshal of the order to embark for Cyprus with all their possessions. Pierre de Severy agreed. An Emir and 100 mameluks were permitted to enter the fort, but they began to molest some women and boys. Furious at this act, the knights slaughtered the mameluks and barricaded themselves again. That night, Pierre sent the treasure of the order with its commander, Thibaud Gaudin, and some non-combatants by boat to Sidon. Acre fell the following day.

Thibaud Gaudin arrived with some knights at Sidon, where he was elected Grand Master. The Templars were determined to stand, but because they lacked the numbers to properly defend the large city, they evacuated the city and moved to the Castle of the Sea. Thibaud Gaudin went to Cyprus in the hope of gathering reinforcements. The Templars fought bravely, but once the engineers started building a causeway, they sailed away to Tortosa. July 14, 1291 emir ‘Alam al-Din Sanjar al-Shuja‘i al-Mansuri (عَلَمُ الدِّينِ سَنْجَرُ الشُّجَاعِيُّ المَنْصُورِيُّ, romanised: ʿAlam ad-Dīn Sanǧar aš-Šuǧāʿī al-Manṣūrī) entered the castle and ordered its destruction. The reinforcements never came. Beirut was taken on July 21, the castle of Ibelins and its walls were completely destroyed. The sultan occupied Haifa on July 30, and the monasteries of Carmel were destroyed. In early August, the Franks held nothing more than two fortified towns, both occupied by Templars. However, the garrisons were too weak to face a siege, so Tortosa was evacuated on August 3 and Athlit on August 14. They left for the sea fort of Ruad, two miles off the coast of Tortosa, which would remain in their hands until 1303, when the future of the order was in jeopardy.

In October 1291, a general chapter of the order met in Cyprus. This meeting confirmed the election of Thibaud Gaudin as Grand Master and named new dignitaries in the important positions within the hierarchy of the order. Thibaud Gaudin tried to reorganize all the Templars after the devastation of the recent battles. Moreover, he needed to defend the Kingdom of Armenia from the encircled Turkish Seljuks and the island of Cyprus, occupied by a multitude of refugees. It is alleged Gaudin died in battle in 1292, leaving an enormous rebuilding task for his successor, Jacques de Molay.

== Sources ==
- Nicholson, Helen (2001). The Knights Templar: A New History. Stroud: Sutton. ISBN 0-7509-2517-5.

Preceded by Guillaume de Beaujeu	Grand Master of the Knights Templar; 1291–1292	Succeeded by Jacques de Molay
