= Leonardo's Swans =

Book by Karen Essex

- First Edition Book Cover, Doubleday
- Author: Karen Essex
- Language: English
- Publisher: Doubleday
- Publication date: January 9, 2006
- Publication place: United States
- Media type: Print (Hardcover)
- Pages: 358 pp
- ISBN: 0-385-51706-8
- OCLC: 60414415
- Dewey Decimal: 813/.54 22
- LC Class: PS3555.S682 L46 2006

Leonardo's Swans is an international bestseller by Karen Essex, published by Doubleday in 2006. The novel tells the story of the rivalry between the powerful Este sisters, Beatrice and Isabella, princesses of the House of Ferrara, as they competed for the attentions of both the Duke of Milan and Leonardo da Vinci when the artist was court painter in the High Renaissance. Also included are excerpts from Leonardo's own journals and letters, which reflect the contents of each chapter.

== Reception ==
The Washington Post praised Essex’ portrayal of Leonardo. “Leonardo's character is one of the great surprises of this book, and in portraying him the author never seems to engage in post-Dan Brown opportunism. The reader may be constantly reminded of Leonardo's genius, but he is an understated figure, a brilliant but disorganized mind whose twitchy intelligence makes him interested in starting countless projects but able to finish few. One of the pleasures of reading this book is learning the secret history behind paintings like The Last Supper and The Virgin of the Rocks.

The novel was widely read and acclaimed in Italy and won the Premio Roma for Foreign Fiction in 2007. It is published in twenty-five languages.
