= Stealing Athena =

2008 novel by Karen Essex

- First Edition Book Cover, Doubleday
- Author: Karen Essex
- Language: English
- Publisher: Doubleday
- Publication date: June 2008
- Publication place: United States
- Media type: Print (hardcover)

Stealing Athena is a historical novel by Karen Essex, which chronicles the journey of the controversial Elgin Marbles or Parthenon Sculptures from their home atop the Acropolis in Athens to the present location, The British Museum. The story is told in dual narratives from the points of view of Mary Nisbet, Countess of Elgin, who assisted her husband, British ambassador Lord Elgin, in removing the marbles, and Aspasia, mistress to Pericles, who witnessed the construction of the Parthenon. Published by Doubleday, June 2008.
