= Karen Essex =

American historical novelist, screenwriter, and journalist

- Born: New Orleans, Louisiana, U.S.
- Education: Tulane University; Vanderbilt University; Goddard College (MFA)
- Occupations: Historical novelist; screenwriter; journalist
- Website: karenessex.com/main/

Karen Essex is an American historical novelist, a screenwriter, and journalist.

== Early life and education ==
Essex was born in New Orleans, Louisiana. As a teenager, she got involved with the theatre and focused her collegiate studies on costume design and theatrical history at Tulane University. She later attended an interdisciplinary graduate program at Vanderbilt University, and in 1999, received an MFA. in Writing at Goddard College in Vermont.

== Career ==
=== Film production ===
After college, Essex briefly modeled in Europe before returning to the U. S. where she found an entrée into the film industry as a costume designer. She moved into executive positions, becoming vice-president of a subsidiary of Blake Edwards Entertainment and senior vice-president of Force Ten Productions, a bi-coastal company that financed Broadway, Off-Broadway, and motion pictures. By the early 1990s, she had given birth to her only child and had resigned from film production to pursue a career in writing.

=== Writer ===
Essex first short story, “Three Audreys,” was published in The Sun: A Magazine of Ideas. Based on that story and on her knowledge of popular music, she was hired by L. A. Style Magazine to write a lengthy profile of the band Los Lobos, which began her career as a music journalist. In 1991, she wrote a cover story for The L. A. Weekly, "In Search of Bettie Page", which kicked off the Bettie Page revival and led to a biography of the pin-up queen, Bettie Page: Life of a Pin-Up Legend, written with the reclusive Page’s cooperation. In 1994, Essex moved to Nashville, where she worked as a music journalist and taught writing workshops at Vanderbilt University’s Women’s Center. She returned to Los Angeles in 2000.

In 1992, while studying women’s history, Essex discovered that the historical Cleopatra had little to do with the Elizabeth Taylor creation that existed in the popular imagination. Her two-volume novel, Kleopatra and Pharaoh, published in 2001 and 2002 respectively, reimagined the queen as a shrewd ruler and diplomat. Essex also adapted the books into a screenplay for Warner Bros. In 2004, while staring at the mural opposite The Last Supper in Milan, she decided to write a novel about the powerful Este sisters—both muses to Leonardo da Vinci—and their rivalry for the attentions of the Duke of Milan as well as for the artist. Leonardo's Swans was published by Doubleday in 2006 and became a bestseller both nationally and internationally. It was especially popular in Italy, where it became a runaway bestseller and won the 2007 Premio Roma for foreign fiction. Stealing Athena (Doubleday 2008) tells the story of the controversial Elgin Marbles told from the dual narratives of Mary Nisbet, wife of the Earl of Elgin, British ambassador to Constantinople, and Aspasia, mistress of Pericles during the Golden Age of Athens. All of her novels have received praise for her meticulous research, attention to detail, and evocation of the historical settings. No matter what the setting, Essex’s books are always about women and power. In an interview on her website about Stealing Athena, Essex said. “Although women of power and influence have always existed, history has not always recorded their contributions and achievements. It has been my ambition in each of my novels to retell the stories of strong and beguiling women who helped to change the world.”

In 2010, Essex released Dracula in Love, a retelling of Bram Stoker's Dracula from the viewpoint of Mina Murray. AudioFile magazine gave the audiobook recording its Earphones Award, calling the story "the real deal" and writing that narrator Bianca Amato "gives Mina a measured, deeply felt emotional depth that brings her alive and keeps listeners engaged."

== Published works ==
- Bettie Page: Life of a Pin-Up Legend, co-written with James L. Swanson (1996) ISBN 978-1-57544-080-4
- Kleopatra (2001) ISBN 978-0-446-52740-8
- Pharaoh (2002) ISBN 978-0-446-53025-5
- Leonardo's Swans (2006) ISBN 978-0-7679-2306-4
- Stealing Athena (2008) ISBN 978-0-385-51971-7
- Dracula in Love: A Novel (2010) ISBN 978-0-385-52891-7
