= List of historical novelists =

This page provides a list of novelists who have written historical novels. Countries named are where they worked for longer periods. Alternative names appear before the dates.

== A ==
- Edwin Abbott (1838–1926, England)
- Peter Ackroyd (born 1949, England)
- Gil Adamson (born 1961, Canada)
- Emma Adler (1858–1935, Austria)
- Joan Aiken (1924–2004, England)
- Lucy Aikin (1781–1864, England)
- William Harrison Ainsworth (1805–1882, England)
- Jan van Aken (born 1961, Netherlands)
- Ismail Fatah Al Turk (1934 or 1938–2004, إسماعيل فتاح الترك, Iraq)
- Leopoldo Alas (1852–1901, Spain)
- Bruce Alexander (1932–2003, US)
- Miriam Alexander (born 1879, England)
- Willibald Alexis (1798–1871, Germany)
- Alexander Allardyce (1846–1896, Scotland)
- Barbara Allen (1914–1986, England)
- Isabel Allende (born 1942, Chile)
- E. M. Almedingen (1898–1971, Russian Empire/England)
- Joseph Alexander Altsheler (1862–1919, US)
- Anurag Anand (born 1978, India)
- Valerie Anand (1937–2024, England)
- Catherine Anderson (born 1948, US)
- Poul Anderson (1926–2001, US)
- Sam Angus (born 1967, England)
- Evelyn Anthony (1926–2018, England)
- Anna Apostolou (born 1946, England)
- Sawako Ariyoshi (有吉佐和子, 1931–1984, Japan)
- Rebecca Agatha Armour (1845–1891, Canada)
- Jirō Asada (born 1951, Japan)
- Makate Asai (朝井まかて, born 1959, Japan)
- Matilde Asensi (born 1962, Spain)
- Margaret Atwood (born 1939, Canada)
- Jean M. Auel (born 1936, US)
- Lynn Austin (born 1949, US)

== B ==
- Balakumaran (1946–2018, India)
- Kathleen Baldwin (living, US)
- Andrew Balfour (1873–1931, Scotland)
- Robert Michael Ballantyne (1825–1894, Scotland)
- Mary Balogh (born 1944, Wales/Canada)
- Sharadindu Bandyopadhyay (1899–1970, India)
- Miklós Bánffy (1873–1950, Hungary)
- John Banim (1798–1842, Ireland)
- Isabella Banks (1821–1897, England)
- Sabine Baring-Gould (1834–1924, England)
- Pat Barker (born 1943, England)
- Vasil Barnovi (1856–1934, Georgia/Soviet Union)
- Sam Barone (living, US)
- Leslie Barringer (1895–1968, England)
- T. A. Barron (born 1952, US)
- Adolf Bartels (1862–1945, Germany)
- Hans Baumann (1914–1988, Germany)
- Nina Bawden (1925–2012, England)
- Ada Ellen Bayly (1857–1903, England), pseudonym of Edna Lyall
- Thea Beckman (1923–2004, Netherlands)
- Frank Beddor (born 1958, US)
- Frans G. Bengtsson (1894–1954, Sweden)
- Robert Hugh Benson (1871–1914, England/Italy)
- Phyllis Bentley (1894–1977, England)
- Louis de Bernières (born 1954, England)
- Sir Walter Besant (1836–1901, England)
- Tom Bevan (1868–1938, England)
- Paul Biegel (1925–2006, Netherlands)
- Charlotte Bingham (1942–2025, England)
- László Z. Bitó (1934–2021, Hungary)
- Björn Th. Björnsson (1922–2007, Iceland)
- R. D. Blackmore (1825–1900, England)
- Celeste De Blasis (1946–2001, US)
- Dennis Bock (born 1964, Canada)
- Emily Bold (born 1980, Germany)
- Elizabeth Bonhôte (1744–1818, England)
- Alice Borchardt (1939–2007, US)
- John Boyne (born 1971, Ireland)
- Paula Brackston (living, England)
- Alan Bradley (1938–2026, Canada)
- Gillian Bradshaw (born 1956, US)
- Anna Eliza Bray (1790–1883, England)
- Wallace Breem (1926–1990, England)
- Frederick Sadleir Brereton (1852–1957, England)
- Emily Brightwell (Cheryl Lanham, born 1948, US)
- Connie Brockway (born 1954, US)
- Geraldine Brooks (born 1955, Australia/US)
- D. K. Broster (1877–1950, England)
- George Mackay Brown (1921–1996, Scotland)
- Valery Bryusov (1873–1924, Russia/Soviet Union)
- John Buchan (1875–1940, Scotland)
- Fiona Buckley (1937–2024, England)
- Frederick Buechner (1926–2022, US)
- Emma Bull (born 1954, US)
- Jacob Breda Bull (1853–1930, Norway)
- Edward Bulwer-Lytton (1803–1873, England)
- Eleanor Burford (1906–1993, England)
- Anthony Burgess (1917–1993, England)
- James Lee Burke (born 1936, US)
- Edgar Rice Burroughs (1875–1950, US)
- Hester Burton (1913–2000, England)
- Jessie Burton (born 1982, England)
- Frederick Busch (1941–2006, US)
- A. S. Byatt (1936–2023, England)
- Elizabeth Byrd (1912–1989, US)

== C ==
- Hall Caine (1853–1931, England/Isle of Man)
- Italo Calvino (1923–1985, Italy)
- L. Sprague de Camp (1907–2000, US)
- Peter Carey (born 1943, Australia)
- William Carleton (1794–1869, Ireland)
- Liz Carlyle (born 1958, US)
- Caleb Carr (1955–2024, US)
- John Dickson Carr (1906–1977, US)
- Philippa Carr (1906–1993, England)
- Catherine Carswell (1879–1946, Scotland)
- Ronald G. Carter (1932–2008, US)
- Willa Cather (1873–1947, US)
- Nancy Cato (1917–2000, Australia)
- Juraj Červenák (born 1974, Czechoslovakia/Slovakia)
- Elizabeth Chadwick (born 1957, England)
- Somerset de Chair (1911–1995, England)
- Aleksey Chapygin (1870–1937, Russia/Soviet Union)
- Isabel Cheix (1839–1899, Spain)
- Tracy Chevalier (born 1962, US)
- Alfred John Church (1829–1912, England)
- Winston Churchill (1871–1947, US)
- Alys Clare (Elizabeth Harris, born 1944, England)
- Mrs. Henry Clarke (1853–1908, England)
- Marcus Clarke (1846–1881, Australia)
- Susanna Clarke (born 1959, England)
- James Clavell (1924–1994, England/US)
- Brian Cleeve (1921–2003, England)
- Rory Clements (born 20th century, England)
- Michael Clynes (born 1946, England)
- Ioan Mihai Cochinescu (born 1951, Romania)
- Jonathan Coe (born 1961, England)
- Jan Coffey (living, US), pseudonym of James A. McGoldrick and Nikoo Kafi McGoldrick, a married couple
- Christabel Rose Coleridge (1843–1921, England)
- Wilkie Collins (1824–1889, England)
- Padraic Colum (1881–1972, Ireland/US)
- Maryse Condé (1937–2024, Guadeloupe)
- Marita Conlon-McKenna (born 1956, Ireland)
- Joseph Conrad (1857–1924, England)
- Judith Cook (1933–2004, England)
- Barbara Cooney (1917–2000, US)
- James Fenimore Cooper (1789–1851, US)
- Bernard Cornwell (born 1944, England)
- Thomas B. Costain (1885–1965, Canada/US)
- Catherine Coulter (born 1942, US)
- Dilly Court (born 1940, England)
- Jim Crace (born 1946, England)
- Helen Craik (c. 1751–1825, Scotland/England)
- Jasmine Cresswell (born 1941, Wales)
- Donna Woolfolk Cross (born 1947, US)
- Andrew Crumey (born 1961, Scotland)
- Karen Cushman (born 1941, US)
- Catherine Cuthbertson (c. 1775–1842, England)

== D ==
- Maria Dąbrowska (1889–1965, Poland)
- Felix Dahn (1834–1912, Germany)
- Alice Dalgliesh (1893–1979, US)
- Grigory Danilevsky (1829–1890, Ukraine/Russian Empire)
- László Darvasi (born 1962, Hungary)
- Emma Darwin (born 1964, England)
- J. D. Davies (born 1957, Wales)
- Lindsey Davis (born 1949, England)
- William Stearns Davis (1877–1930, US)
- Vilborg Davíðsdóttir (born 1965, Iceland)
- Len Deighton (born 1929, England)
- Miguel Delibes (1920–2010, Spain)
- Don DeLillo (born 1936, US)
- Penelope Delta (1874–1941, Greece)
- Zsófia Dénes (1885–1987, Hungary)
- August Derleth (1909–1971, US)
- Jude Deveraux (born 1947, US)
- Patrick deWitt (born 1975, Canada)
- Charles Dezobry (1798–1871, France)
- Anita Diamant (born 1951, US)
- Graham Diamond (born 1945, England)
- Charles Dickens (1812–1870, England)
- Benjamin Disraeli (1804–1881, England)
- E. L. Doctorow (1931–2015, US)
- Mary Mapes Dodge (1831–1905, US)
- Anthony Doerr (born 1973, US)
- Paul C. Doherty (born 1946, England)
- David Donachie (1944–2023, Scotland)
- Angus Donald (born 1965, England)
- Anton Donchev (1930–2022, Bulgaria)
- Emma Donoghue (born 1969, England/Canada)
- Thomas Doubleday (1790–1870, England)
- Sir Arthur Conan Doyle (1859–1930, Scotland/England)
- Tonke Dragt (1930–2024, Netherlands)
- Joan Druett (living, New Zealand)
- Maurice Druon (1918–2009, France)
- Anna Harriett Drury (1824–1912, England)
- Daphne du Maurier (1907–1989, England)
- John Langalibalele Dube (1871–1946, South Africa) in isiZulu
- María Dueñas (born 1964, Spain)
- Alfred Duggan (1903–1964, England)
- Ann Dukthas (born 1946, England)
- Alexandre Dumas, père (1802–1870, France)
- Dorothy Dunnett (1923–2001, Scotland)
- Mary Durack (1913–1994, Australia)
- David Anthony Durham (born 1969, US)

== E ==
- Marion Eames (1921–2007, Wales)
- Georg Ebers (1837–1898, Germany)
- Allan W. Eckert (1931–2011, US)
- Ernst Eckstein (1845–1900, Germany)
- Umberto Eco (1932–2016, Italy)
- John George Edgar (1834–1864, England)
- Arabella Edge (living, England/Australia)
- Robert Edric (born 1956, England)
- George Eliot (1819–1880, England)
- Peter Berresford Ellis (born 1943, England), pseudonym Peter Tremayne
- James Ellroy (born 1948, US)
- Shūsaku Endō (遠藤周作, 1923–1996, Japan)
- József Eötvös (1813–1871, Hungary)
- Amy Ephron (born 1952, US)
- Erckmann-Chatrian (France), pseudonym of Émile Erckmann (1822–1899) and Alexandre Chatrian (1826–1890)
- Rica Erickson (1908–2009, Australia)
- I. O. Evans (1894–1977, South Africa/England)
- Evelyn Everett-Green (1856–1932, England)
- Elizabeth Eyre (England), pseudonym of Jill Staynes and Margaret Storey

== F ==
- Michel Faber (born 1960, England)
- Cerridwen Fallingstar (born 1952, US)
- Penelope Farmer (born 1939, England)
- Frederic William Farrar (1831–1903, England)
- J. G. Farrell (1935–1979, England)
- Howard Fast (1914–2003, US)
- Sebastian Faulks (born 1953, England)
- Madame de la Fayette (1634–1693, France)
- Jane Feather (born 1945, England/US)
- George Manville Fenn (1831–1909, England)
- Leon Feuchtwanger (1884–1958, Germany/US)
- Mrs. E. M. Field (1856–1940, Ireland)
- Charles Finch (born 1980, US)
- Penelope Fitzgerald (1916–2000, England)
- John Flanagan (1944–2026, Australia)
- Raymond Flanagan (1903–1990, US)
- Richard Flanagan (born 1961, Australia)
- Gustave Flaubert (1821–1880, France)
- Katie Flynn (1936–2019, England)
- Per Anders Fogelström (1919–1998, Sweden)
- Jolán Földes (1902–1963, Hungary)
- Ken Follett (born 1949, Wales/England)
- Theodor Fontane (1819–1898, Germany)
- Elburd Ford (1906–1993, England)
- C. S. Forester (1899–1966, England)
- William R. Forstchen (born 1950, US)
- E. M. Foster, Mrs. (fl. late 18th – early 19th c., England)
- Karen Joy Fowler (born 1950, US)
- John Fowles (1926–2005, England)
- Louise von François (1817–1893, Germany)
- Bruno Frank (1878–1945, Germany/US)
- George MacDonald Fraser (1925–2008, Scotland)
- Mary Crawford Fraser (1851–1922, Italy/US)
- Margaret Frazer (1946–2013, US)
- Gustav Freytag (1816–1895, Germany)
- Alan Furst (born 1941, US)
- Dale Furutani (born 1946, US)
- Sandy Fussell (born 1960, Australia)

== G ==
- Diana Gabaldon (born 1952, US)
- Benito Pérez Galdós (1843–1920, Spain)
- Géza Gárdonyi (1863–1922, Hungary)
- Alan Garner (born 1934, England)
- Elizabeth Gaskell (1810–1865, England)
- Judith Gautier (1845–1917, France)
- Jamila Gavin (born 1941, India/England)
- Roberta Gellis (1927–2016, US)
- Margaret George (born 1943, US)
- Anton Gill (living, England)
- George Gissing (1857–1903, England)
- Nikolai Gogol (1809–1852, Russia)
- Arthur Golden (born 1956, US)
- Julia Golding (born 1969, England)
- William Golding (1911–1993, England)
- Jason Goodwin (born 1964, England)
- Noah Gordon (1926–2021, US)
- Elizabeth Goudge (1900–1984, England)
- Iris Gower (1935–2010, Wales)
- C. L. Grace (born 1946, England)
- Posie Graeme-Evans (born 1952, Australia)
- James Grant (1822–1887, Scotland)
- Joan Grant (1907–1989, England)
- Ralph Graves (1924–2013, US)
- Robert Graves (1895–1985, England)
- Michael Cawood Green (born 1954, South Africa/England)
- Frances Nimmo Greene (1867–1937, US)
- Philippa Gregory (born 1954, England)
- Susanna Gregory (Elizabeth Cruwys, living, England)
- Gerald Griffin (1803–1840, Ireland)
- Sara Gruen (born 1969, Canada/US)
- Jan Guillou (born 1944, France)
- Yaa Gyasi (born 1989, Ghana/US)

== H ==
- Hella Haasse (1918–2011, Netherlands)
- H. Rider Haggard (1856–1925, England)
- Barbara Hambly (born 1951, US)
- Judith Hand (born 1940, US)
- Enrica von Handel-Mazzetti (1871–1955, Austria)
- Kristin Hannah (born 1960, US)
- Paul Harding (born 1946, England)
- Mollie Hardwick (born 1946, England)
- Thomas Hardy (1840–1928, England)
- Cynthia Harnett (1893–1981, England)
- Stephen Harrigan (born 1948, US)
- Robert Harris (born 1957, England)
- Christopher Hart (born 1965, England), pseudonym William Napier
- Bret Harte (1836–1902, US)
- Sonya Hartnett (born 1968, Australia)
- Jan de Hartog (1914–2002, Netherlands)
- Samantha Harvey (born 1975, England)
- Charles Boardman Hawes (1889–1923, US)
- Simon Hawke (born 1951, US)
- Karen Hawkins (living, US)
- Catherine Hay (1910–1995, New Zealand)
- Shirl Henke (born 1942, US)
- Virginia Henley (born 1935, England)
- Vera Henriksen (1927–2016, Norway)
- G. A. Henty (1832–1902, England)
- Wilhelm Herchenbach (1818–1889, Germany)
- Ferenc Herczeg (1863–1954, Hungary)
- Maurice Hewlett (1861–1923, England)
- Georgette Heyer (1902–1974, England)
- Eleanor Hibbert (1906–1993, England)
- Susan Higginbotham (living, US)
- Naseem Hijazi (1914–1996, India/Pakistan)
- Justin Hill (born 1971, Bahamas/Hong Kong)
- Ginés Pérez de Hita (c. 1544 – c. 1619, Spain)
- Jane Aiken Hodge (1917–2009, England)
- C. Walter Hodges (1909–2004, England)
- Cecelia Holland (born 1943, US)
- Tom Holland (born 1968, England)
- Sheri Holman (born 1966, US)
- Emily Sarah Holt (1836–1893, England)
- Tom Holt (born 1961, England)
- Victoria Holt (1906–1993, England)
- Nancy Horan (living, US)
- Hannah Howell (born 1950, US)
- Elizabeth Hoyt (Julia Harper, living, US)
- Victor Hugo (1802–1885, France)
- Wilhelm Hünermann (1900–1975, Germany)
- Jillian Hunter (born 1950, US)
- S. L. Hunter (born 1951, US)

== I ==
- Eva Ibbotson (1925–2010, Austria/England)
- Conn Iggulden (born 1971, England)
- Shōtarō Ikenami (池波正太郎, 1923–1990, Japan)
- Neamat Imam (born 1971, Bangladesh/Canada)
- Elisabeth Inglis-Jones (1900–1994, Wales)
- Yasushi Inoue (1907–1991, Japan)
- Kazuo Ishiguro (born 1954, Japan/England)
- Eowyn Ivey (living, US)
- Motohiko Izawa (born 1954, Japan)

== J ==
- Violet Jacob (1863–1946, Scotland)
- Christian Jacq (born 1947, France)
- John Jakes (1932–2023, US)
- George Payne Rainsford James (1799–1860, England)
- Rosemary Hawley Jarman (1935–2015, England)
- Michael Jecks (born 1960, England)
- Gary Jennings (1928–1999, US)
- John Edward Jennings (1906–1973, US)
- Alois Jirásek (1851–1930, Austrian Empire/Czechoslovakia)
- Marie-Elena John (born 1963, Antigua/US)
- Joan Johnston (living, US)
- Maria I. Johnston (1835–1921, US)
- Mór Jókai (1825–1904, Hungary)
- Rhiannon Davies Jones (1921–2014, Wales)
- T. Llew Jones (1915–2009, Wales)
- Terry Jones (1942–2020, Wales)
- Erica Jong (born 1942, US)
- Penny Jordan (1946–2001, England)
- Sherryl Jordan (1949–2023, New Zealand)
- Miklós Jósika (1794–1865, Hungary)
- Jacqueline Jules (born 1956, US)

== K ==
- Sirpa Kähkönen (born 1964, Finland)
- Chōgorō Kaionji (海音寺潮五郎, 1901–1977, Japan)
- Ivan Kakovitch
- Amita Kanekar (born 1965, India)
- John Katzenbach (born 1950, US)
- Karen Kay (living, US)
- Annie Keary (1825–1879, England)
- Kathleen Kellow (1906–1993, England)
- Carla Kelly (born 1947, US)
- Zsigmond Kemény (1814–1875, Hungary)
- Debra Kemp (1957–2015, US)
- Lena Kennedy (1914–1986, England)
- Alexander Kent (1924–2017, England)
- Louise Andrews Kent (1886–1969, US)
- Judith Kerr (1923–2019, England)
- Philip Kerr (1956–2018, England)
- Sue Monk Kidd (born 1948, US)
- Garry Kilworth (born 1941, England)
- Susan King (born 1951, US)
- Charles Kingsley (1819–1875, England)
- Barbara Kingsolver (born 1955, US)
- Rudyard Kipling (1865–1936, India/England)
- Nobori Kiuchi (木内昇, born 1967, Japan)
- Julie Klassen (living, US)
- Lisa Kleypas (born 1964, US)
- Bernard Knight (born 1931, Wales/England)
- János Kodolányi (1899–1969, Hungary)
- Arthur Koestler (1905–1983, Hungary/England)
- E. L. Konigsburg (1930–2013, US)
- Károly Kós (1883–1977, Hungary/Transylvania)
- Zofia Kossak-Szczucka (1889–1968, Poland)
- Dezső Kosztolányi (1884–1936, Hungary)
- Marek Krajewski (born 1966, Poland)
- Józef Ignacy Kraszewski (1812–1887, Poland)
- Kalki Krishnamurthy (1899–1954, India)
- Giles Kristian (born 1975, England)
- Jónas Kristjánsson (1924–2014, Iceland)
- Inge Krokann (1893–1962, Norway)
- Jaan Kross (1920–2007, Estonia)
- Gyula Krúdy (1878–1933, Hungary)
- Lynn Kurland (living, US)
- Katherine Kurtz (born 1944, US)
- Hermann Kurz (1813–1873, Germany)

== L ==
- R. A. Lafferty (1914–2002, US)
- Ross Laidlaw (living, Scotland)
- Elizabeth Laird (born 1943, England)
- Ludwig Laistner (1845–1896, Germany)
- Giuseppe Tomasi di Lampedusa (1896–1957, Italy)
- Jill Marie Landis (born 1948, US)
- Jane Lane (1905–1978, England)
- Andrew Lang (1844–1912, Scotland/England)
- W. Patrick Lang (1940–2023, US)
- Noel Langley (1911–1980, South Africa/US)
- Jane Langton (1922–2018, US)
- Mariano José de Larra (1809–1837, Spain)
- David Lassman (born 1963, England)
- Janet Laurence (born 1937, England)
- Stephen R. Lawhead (born 1950, US/England)
- Halldór Laxness (1902–1998, Iceland)
- Ross Leckie (born 1957, Scotland)
- Sophia Lee (1750–1824, England)
- Perry Lentz (born 1943, US)
- George Leonardos (born 1937, Greece)
- Doris Leslie (1891–1982, England)
- Celia Moss Levetus (1819–1873, England)
- Hilda Lewis (1896–1974, England)
- Stephen Lewis (born 1937, Canada)
- Philip Lindsay (1906–1958, Australia)
- Johanna Lindsey (1952–2019, US)
- Ling Li (曾黎力, 1942–2018, China)
- David Liss (born 1966, US)
- S. E. Lister (born 1988, England)
- Penelope Lively (born 1933, England)
- John Gibson Lockhart (1794–1854, Scotland)
- Christoph Lode (born 1977, Germany)
- Norah Lofts (1904–1983, England)
- William Stuart Long (1914–1986, England)
- Jarmila Loukotková (1923–2007, Czechoslovakia/Czech Republic)
- Luo Guanzhong (1330–1400, China)
- Francisco Herrera Luque (1927–1991, Venezuela)

== M ==
- Ma Duanlin (1245–1322, China)
- Catherine Maberly (1805–1875, Ireland)
- Rose Macaulay (1881–1958, England)
- Mary Mackie (born early 1940s, England)
- Salvador de Madariaga (1886–1978, Spain)
- Ragnhild Magerøy (1920–2010, Norway)
- Naguib Mahfouz (1911–2006, Egypt)
- Paul L. Maier (1930–2025, US)
- Karen Maitland (born 1956, England)
- Rosie Malek-Yonan (born 1965, Iran/US)
- Thomas Mallon (born 1951, US)
- Eric Malpass (1910–1996, England)
- Valerio Massimo Manfredi (born 1942, Italy)
- Heinrich Mann (1871–1950, Germany/France)
- Thomas Mann (1875–1955, Germany/Switzerland)
- Anne Manning (1807–1879, England)
- Hilary Mantel (1952–2022, England)
- Juliet Marillier (born 1948, New Zealand)
- Stephen Marley (living, England)
- Deb Marlowe (living, US)
- Paul Marlowe (living, Canada)
- Frederick Marryat (1792–1848, England)
- Andrew Martin (born 1962, England)
- Valerie Martin (born 1948, US)
- William Martin (living, US)
- Moa Martinson (1890–1964, Sweden)
- F. Van Wyck Mason (1901–1978, US)
- J. D. Masters (born 1951, US)
- John Masters (1914–1983, India)
- Seichō Matsumoto (松本清張, 1909–1992, Japan)
- Ellen Mattson (b. 1962, Sweden)
- Sir Herbert Maxwell (1845–1937, Scotland)
- William Mayne (1928–2010, England)
- Cormac McCarthy (1933–2023, US)
- Colleen McCullough (1937–2015, Australia)
- Ian McEwan (born 1948, England)
- Katharine McMahon (living, England)
- Larry McMurtry (1936–2021, US)
- James Meek (born 1962, England)
- Elizabeth Meeke (1761 – c. 1826, England)
- Wilhelm Meinhold (1797–1851, Pomerania/Germany)
- Eduardo Mendoza (born 1943, Spain)
- Dmitry Merezhkovsky (1865–1941, Russia/France)
- Prosper Mérimée (1803–1870, France)
- Robert Merle (1908–2004, France)
- Henry Seton Merriman (1862–1903, England)
- Conrad Ferdinand Meyer (1825–1898, Switzerland)
- James A. Michener (1907–1997, US)
- Kálmán Mikszáth (1847–1910, Hungary)
- Andrew Miller (born 1960, England)
- Linda Lael Miller (born 1949, US)
- Madeline Miller (born 1978, US)
- David Mitchell (born 1969, England)
- Margaret Mitchell (1900–1949, US)
- Naomi Mitchison (1897–1999, Scotland/England)
- Ryu Mitsuse (光瀬龍, 1928–1999, Japan)
- Karyn Monk (living, Canada)
- Aly Monroe (living, England)
- Brian Moore (1921–1999, Northern Ireland/US)
- Thomas Moore (1779–1852, Ireland/England)
- Ferenc Móra (1879–1934, Hungary)
- Zsigmond Móricz (1879–1942, Hungary)
- Michelle Moran (born 1980, US)
- Daniil Mordovtsev (1830–1905, Russia)
- R. N. Morris
- Toni Morrison (1931–2019, US)
- Kate Morton (born 1976, Australia)
- Fiona Mozley (born 1988, England)
- Luise Mühlbach (1814–1873, Germany)
- Vera Mutafchieva (1929–2009, Bulgaria)

== N ==
- Ladislav Nádaši-Jégé (1866–1940, Hungary/Czechoslovakia)
- Michiko Nagai (1925–2023, Japan)
- Marie von Najmajer (1844–1904, Austrian Empire)
- Benedikte Naubert (1752–1819, Germany)
- John Neal (1793–1876, US)
- Vladimír Neff (1909–1983, Czechoslovakia)
- John Henry Newman (1801–1890, England)
- Nerida Newton (born 1972, Australia)
- Nicholas Nicastro (born 1963, US)
- Luis López Nieves (born 1950, US (Puerto Rico))
- Jirō Nitta (1912–1980, Japan)
- Jennifer Niven (born 1968, US)
- Lawrence Norfolk (born 1963, England)
- Andre Norton (1912–2005, US)
- Mary Novik (born 1945, Canada)
- Robert Nye (1939–2016, England)

== O ==
- Patrick O'Brian (1914–2000, England)
- Scott O'Dell (1898–1989, US)
- Scott Oden (born 1967, US)
- Zoe Oldenbourg (1916–2002, France)
- Margaret Oliphant (1828–1897, Scotland/England)
- Carola Oman (1897–1978, England)
- Michael Ondaatje (born 1943, Canada)
- Anthony O'Neill (born 1964, Australia)
- Geraldine O'Neill (born 1955, Ireland)
- Oliver Onions (1873–1961, England)
- Adèle Sophia Cordelia Opzoomer (1856–1925, Netherlands)
- Baroness Orczy (1865–1947, England)
- Julie Orringer (born 1973, US)

== P ==
- Henriette Paalzow (1788–1847, Germany)
- Charles Palliser (born 1947, US/Scotland)
- William Palmer (born 1943, US)
- Jan Parandowski (1895–1978, Poland)
- Edith Pargeter (1913–1995, England)
- Delia Parr (living, US)
- Walter Pater (1839–1894, England)
- Jenny Pattrick (born 1936, New Zealand)
- Roberto Payró (1867–1928, Argentina)
- Frances Mary Peard (1835–1923, England)
- Iain Pears (born 1955, England)
- Borislav Pekić (1930–1992, Yugoslavia)
- Sharon Kay Penman (1945–2021, US)
- Stef Penney (born 1969, Scotland)
- Anna Percival (1906–1993, England)
- Eva Díaz Pérez (born 1971, Spain)
- Arturo Pérez-Reverte (born 1951, Spain)
- Anne Perry (1938–2023, England)
- Malte Persson (born 1976, Sweden)
- Leo Perutz (1882–1957, Austria/Palestine)
- Elizabeth Peters (1927–2013, US)
- Ellis Peters (1913–1995, England)
- Maureen Peters (1935–2008, Wales/England)
- Karoline Pichler (1769–1843, Austria)
- Jean Plaidy (Eleanor Hibbert, 1906–1993, England)
- Madeleine A. Polland (1918–2005, Ireland/England)
- Dudley Pope (1925–1997, England)
- Fani Popova-Mutafova (1902–1977, Bulgaria)
- Jovan Sterija Popović (1806–1856, Austrian Empire)
- Jane Porter (1776–1850, Scotland/England)
- Santiago Posteguillo (1967, Valencia/Spain)
- Rhoda Power (1890–1957), England
- H. F. M. Prescott (1896–1972, England)
- Steven Pressfield (born 1943, US)
- Otfried Preußler (1923–2013, Germany)
- Alison Prince (1931–2019, England/Scotland)
- Bolesław Prus (1847–1912, Poland)
- Alexander Pushkin (1799–1837, Russia)
- Mary Jo Putney (living, US)
- Howard Pyle (1853–1911, US)
- Thomas Pynchon (born 1937, US)

== Q ==
- John Quigley (1925–2021, Scotland)

== R ==
- Thomas Head Raddall (1903–1994, England/Canada)
- Undinė Radzevičiūtė (born 1967, Lithuania)
- Hugh C. Rae (1935–2014, Scotland)
- William Rayner (1929–2006, England)
- Charles Reade (1814–1884, England)
- Jaclyn Reding (born 1966, US)
- Douglas Reeman (1924–2017, England)
- Celia Rees (born 1949, England)
- David Rees (1936–1993, England)
- Evan Rees (1850–1923, Wales), known by the bardic name Dyfed
- Philip Reeve (born 1966, England)
- Meta Mayne Reid (1905–1991, Northern Ireland)
- Franziska von Reitzenstein (1834–1896, Germany)
- Mary Renault (1905–1983, England/South Africa)
- Kel Richards (born 1946, Australia)
- Rick Riordan (born 1964, US)
- Karl Ristikivi (1907–1970, Estonia)
- Candace Robb (born 1950, England/US)
- Antoinette Henriette Clémence Robert (1797–1872, France)
- Keith Roberts (1935–2000, England)
- Kenneth Roberts (1885–1957, US)
- Emma Robinson (1814–1890, England)
- Hilary Robinson (born 1962, England)
- Lynda Robinson (born 1951, US)
- Lucia St. Clair Robson (born 1942, US)
- Tsoncho Rodev (1926–2011, Bulgaria)
- Rosemary Rogers (1932–2019, Ceylon/US)
- Romain Rolland (1866–1944, France)
- Elliott Roosevelt (1910–1990, US)
- Tatiana de Rosnay (born 1961, France/England)
- Joseph Roth (1894–1939, Austria/Germany)
- Laura Joh Rowland (living, US)
- Fredrika Runeberg (1807–1879, Finland)
- Salman Rushdie (born 1947, England/US)
- Mary Doria Russell (born 1950, US)
- Anna Rutgers van der Loeff (1910–1990, Netherlands)
- Edward Rutherfurd (born 1948, England)
- Viktor Rydberg (1828–1895, Sweden)

== S ==
- Rafael Sabatini (1875–1950, Italy/England)
- Sandilyan (1910–1987, India)
- C. J. Sansom (1952–2024, Scotland)
- Mitsugu Saotome (早乙女貢, 1926–2008, China/Japan)
- Romain Sardou (born 1974, France)
- Allen Say (born 1937, US)
- Steven Saylor (born 1956, US)
- Simon Scarrow (born 1962, England)
- Nat Schachner (1895–1955, US)
- Joseph Viktor von Scheffel (1826–1886, Germany)
- Bernhard Schlink (born 1944, Germany)
- Lawrence Schoonover (1906–1980, US)
- Rainer M. Schröder (born 1951, Germany)
- Leonardo Sciascia (1921–1989, Italy)
- Lawrence Scott (born 1943, Trinidad/England)
- Susan Holloway Scott (living, US)
- Sir Walter Scott (1771–1832, Scotland)
- Kate Sedley (1926–2022, England)
- Lisa See (born 1955, US)
- Ramón J. Sender (1901–1982, Spain)
- Ruta Sepetys (born 1967, Lithuania/US)
- Kate Seredy (1899–1975, US)
- Ian Serraillier (1912–1994, England)
- Anya Seton (1904–1990, US)
- Tim Severin (1940–2020, England)
- Jeffrey Shaara (born 1952, US)
- Michael Shaara (1928–1988, US)
- Mary Ann Shaffer (1934–2008, US)
- Samuel Shellabarger (1888–1954, US)
- Mary Shelley (1797–1851, England)
- Sara Sheridan (born 1968, Scotland)
- Joseph Henry Shorthouse (1834–1903, England)
- Henryk Sienkiewicz (1846–1916, Poland)
- Germaine Simon (1921–2012, Luxembourg)
- Ieva Simonaitytė (1897–1978, Lithuania)
- Rebecca Sinclair (living, US)
- Sjón (born 1962, Iceland)
- Bertrice Small (1937–2015, US)
- Wilbur Smith (1933–2021, Northern Rhodesia/Zambia)
- Alan Spence (born 1947, Scotland)
- LaVyrle Spencer (1864–1926, England)
- Armstrong Sperry (1897–1976, US)
- György Spiró (born 1946, Hungary)
- Francis Spufford (born 1964, England)
- Eva Stachniak (born 1952, Poland/Canada)
- David Stacton (1923–1968, US)
- Emiliyan Stanev (1907–1979, Bulgaria)
- Louisa Stanhope (fl. 1806–1827, England)
- Ludwik Stasiak (1858–1924, Poland)
- Flora Annie Steel (1847–1929, India/England)
- Robert Louis Stevenson (1850–1894, Scotland)
- Mary Stewart (1916–2014), England/Scotland)
- Isabel Stilwell (born 1960, Portugal)
- Ilka Stitz (born 1960, Germany)
- Kathryn Stockett (born 1969, US)
- Agnes Strickland (1796–1874, England)
- Olga Stringfellow (1923–1995, New Zealand)
- Ulrika von Strussenfelt (1801–1873, Sweden)
- Alex Stuart, Robyn Stuart and Vivian Stuart (1914–1986, England)
- Rosemary Sutcliff (1920–1992, England)
- Magda Szabó (1917–2007, Hungary)
- Noémi Szécsi (born 1976, Hungary)
- Mária Szepes (1908–2007, Hungary)

== T ==
- Karin Tanabe (living, US)
- Reay Tannahill (1929–2007, Scotland/England)
- Ellalice Tate (1906–1993, England)
- Janelle Taylor (born 1944, US)
- Fanny Tercy (1782–1851, France)
- William Makepeace Thackeray (1811–1863, England)
- James Alexander Thom (1933–2023, US)
- Jodi Thomas (living, US)
- Elizabeth Thornton (1940–2010)
- Pramoedya Ananta Toer (1925–2006, Dutch East Indies/Indonesia)
- Colm Tóibín (born 1955, Ireland)
- Olga Tokarczuk (born 1962, Poland)
- Aleksey Konstantinovich Tolstoy (1817–1875, Russia)
- Aleksey Nikolayevich Tolstoy (1883–1945, Russia/Soviet Union)
- Leo Tolstoy (1828–1910, Russia)
- Theresa Tomlinson (born 1946, England)
- Nigel Tranter (1909–2000, Scotland)
- Geoffrey Trease (1909–1998, England)
- Henry Treece (1911–1966, England)
- Rose Tremain (born 1943, England)
- Peter Tremayne (born 1943, England)
- Meriol Trevor (1919–2000, England)
- Anthony Trollope (1815–1882, England)
- Joanna Trollope (1943–2025, England)
- Stefan Tsanev (born 1936, Bulgaria)
- Kunio Tsuji (1925–1999)
- Elizabeth Tudor (Lady Hasanova, born 1978, Azerbaijan)
- Ann Turnbull (born 1943, England)
- Harry Turtledove (born 1949, US)

== U ==
- Max Uhlemann (died 1862, Germany)
- Barry Unsworth (1930–2012, England/Italy)
- Harilal Upadhyay (1916–1994, India)
- Miloš Urban (born 1967, Czech Republic)
- Leon Uris (1924–2003, US)
- Anne Ursu (living, US)

== V ==
- Andrew Vachss (1942–2021, US)
- Robert Van Gulik (1910–1967, Netherlands/Indonesia)
- Guy Vanderhaeghe (born 1951, Canada)
- Carl Franz van der Velde (1779–1824, Germany)
- F.A. Venter (1916–1997, South Africa)
- Nicolaas Vergunst (born 1958, South Africa)
- Caroline Vermalle (born 1973, France)
- Elena Maria Vidal (born 1962, US)
- Gore Vidal (1925–2012, US)
- Rene Villanueva (1954–2007, Philippines)
- Elfrida Vipont (1902–1992, England)
- Ivan Vladislavić (born 1957, South Africa)
- Simone van der Vlugt (born 1966, Netherlands)
- William T. Vollmann (1959, US)
- Anne de Vries (1904–1964, Netherlands)

== W ==
- Lea Wait (1946–2019, US)
- Eva Waldemarsson (1903–1986, Sweden)
- Lew Wallace (1827–1905, US)
- Jill Paton Walsh (1937–2020, England)
- Mika Waltari (1908–1979, Finland)
- Sarah Waters (born 1966, Wales)
- Evelyn Waugh (1903–1966, England)
- Catherine Webb (born 1986, England)
- Elizabeth E. Wein (born 1964, US/Scotland)
- Alison Weir (born 1951, England)
- Ronald Welch (1909–1982, Wales/England)
- Ehm Welk (1884–1966, Germany)
- Percy F. Westerman (1876–1959, England)
- Helena Westermarck (1857–1938), Finland)
- Jeri Westerson (born 1960, US)
- Stanley J. Weyman (1855–1928, England)
- Richard S. Wheeler (1935–2019, US)
- Charles Whistler (1856–1913, England)
- T. H. White (1906–1964, England)
- Jack Whyte (1940–2021, Scotland/Canada)
- George Whyte-Melville (1821–1878, Scotland)
- Susan Wiggs (born 1958, US)
- Anne Wignall (1912–1982, England)
- Thornton Wilder (1897–1975, US)
- Vaughan Wilkins (1890–1959, England)
- Carole Wilkinson (born 1950, Australia)
- Barbara Willard (1909–1994, England)
- Jay Williams (1914–1978, US)
- Maiya Williams (born 1962, US)
- Walter John Williams (born 1953, US)
- Jacqueline Winspear (born 1955, England)
- Jeanette Winterson (born 1959, England)
- Barbara Wood (born 1947, US)
- Kathleen E. Woodiwiss (1939–2007, US)
- Richard Woodman (1944–2024, England)
- Herman Wouk (1915–2019, US)

== Y ==
- Yamada Bimyō (山田 美妙, 1868–1910, Japan)
- Shūgorō Yamamoto (山本周五郎, 1903–1967, Japan)
- Vasily Yan (1874–1954, Russia)
- Chelsea Quinn Yarbro (1942–2025, US)
- Yana Yazova (1912–1974, Bulgaria)
- Frank Yerby (1916–1991, US)
- Nicholas Yermakov (born 1951, US)
- Jane Yolen (1939–2026, US)
- Charlotte Mary Yonge (1823–1901, England)
- Eiji Yoshikawa (吉川 英治, 1892–1962, Japan)
- Robyn Young (born 1975, England)
- Marguerite Yourcenar (1903–1987, Belgium/France)

== Z ==
- Stoyan Zagorchinov (1889–1969, Bulgaria)
- Mikhail Zagoskin (1789–1852, Russia)
- Lajos Zilahy (1891–1974, Hungary)
- Richard Zimler (born 1956, US)
- Karl Zuchardt (1887–1968, Germany)
- Markus Zusak (born 1975, Australia)

== See also ==
- List of writers
