= Sano Ichirō series =

The Sano Ichirō series is a set of eighteen historical detective novels by Laura Joh Rowland, taking place in late 17th century feudal Japan, and set mostly in the capital of Edo (now Tokyo). The series blends Rowland's fictional characters with several prominent historical figures of the period.

== Background ==
Using as her inspiration P.D. James and Elizabeth George, Rowland set out to write a mystery novel. She had been a big fan of samurai films during her university days, and decided to set her first novel in feudal Japan because "I needed to carve out a territory for myself, and feudal Japan was wide open. It was a marriage of interest and opportunity." Rowland wrote two novels, which were rejected for publication. After finishing her third novel, she sent the manuscript to two publishers and presented a copy to a Random House editor whom she had met at a writer's conference. When all three publishers expressed interest, there was a bidding war that Random House won for $100,000. Shinjū was subsequently published by Random House in 1994. The resulting series deals with the experiences of Sano Ichirō (佐野一郎, Ichirō Sano), a samurai and minor official who, by the end of the first novel, becomes the trusted chief investigator for the fifth Tokugawa shōgun, Tokugawa Tsunayoshi, and by the tenth novel, is promoted to a very high office.

Rowland takes some literary license with known figures, creating fictionalized versions of Tokugawa Tsunayoshi, Emperor Higashiyama in The Samurai's Wife, and Yanagisawa Yoshiyasu. Objective historical details, however, are credibly accurate, although New York Times critic F.G. Notehelfer pointed out several historical anachronisms in the first book of the series, Shinjū.

== Sano Ichirō ==
Initially, Sano is a yoriki; by the conclusion of the first novel, he is appointed sosakan-sama, aka "The Most Honorable Investigator of Events, Situations, and People", thus becoming the chief investigator for the shōgun Tokugawa Tsunayoshi. Sano is thus often at odds with the shōgun's primary advisor Yanagisawa Yoshiyasu, who views Ichirō as a potential threat to his power.

Throughout the stories, Sano constantly has to deal with the moral conflict of following the code of bushido while serving both justice and his master, the Shogun. He is frequently faced with death if he does not fulfil his obligations to his master. Fortunately, he is assisted by numerous others, most notably his wife, Ueda Reiko (上田 麗子).

After his arranged marriage at the start of the fourth novel to Reiko, he also has to deal with her non-traditional attitude as she frequently involves herself in Sano's investigations. They later have two children, Masahiro and Akiko, who sometimes become embroiled in the mystery at hand.

== Supporting characters ==
- Ueda Reiko

Sano's wife, the daughter of a powerful magistrate. She is knowledgeable in martial arts.

- Hirata (平田)

Sano's loyal retainer. His first name is never revealed.

- Niu Midori (ニウ ミドリ)

A lady-in-waiting to the shōgun's mother, and friend of Reiko. She later marries Hirata.

- Ito Genboku (伊東 玄朴)

A physician "exiled" to the morgue in Edo Jail, as a punishment for learning foreign medicine. He often aids Sano in examining the corpses of murder victims.

- Yanagisawa Yoshiyasu (柳沢 吉保)

The scheming, manipulative chamberlain to the shōgun. He is antagonistic to Sano, as he fears he is trying to usurp him.

- Tokugawa Tsunayoshi (徳川 綱吉)

The fifth Tokugawa shōgun. He is depicted as weak-willed, and indecisive.

== Titles in the series ==
1. Shinjū (ISBN 978-0-06-100950-1 (1994)
2. Bundori ISBN 0-7472-1717-3 (1996)
3. The Way of the Traitor (ISBN 0-06-101090-1 (1997)
4. The Concubine's Tattoo (ISBN 0-312-19252-5 (1998)
5. The Samurai's Wife (ISBN 0-312-20325-X (2000)
6. Black Lotus (ISBN 0-312-26872-6 (2001)
7. The Pillow Book of Lady Wisteria (ISBN 0-312-28262-1 (2002)
8. The Dragon King's Palace (ISBN 0-312-28266-4 (2003)
9. The Perfumed Sleeve (ISBN 0-312-31889-8 (2004)
10. The Assassin's Touch (ISBN 0-312-31900-2 (2005)
11. The Red Chrysanthemum (ISBN 0-312-35532-7 (2006)
12. The Snow Empress (ISBN 0-312-36542-X (2007)
13. The Fire Kimono (ISBN 0-312-37948-X (2008)
14. The Cloud Pavilion (ISBN 0-312-37949-8 (2009)
15. The Ronin's Mistress (ISBN 0-312-65852-4 (2011)
16. The Incense Game (ISBN 9780312658533 (2012)
17. The Shogun's Daughter (ISBN 9781250028617 (2013)
18. The Iris Fan (ISBN 9781250047069 (2014)
