= The Concubine's Tattoo =

1998 historical mystery novel by Laura Joh Rowland

- Author: Laura Joh Rowland
- Language: English
- Series: Sano Ichirō
- Genre: Historical mystery
- Publisher: St. Martin's Press
- Publication date: 1998
- Publication place: United States
- ISBN: 978-0679434238
- Preceded by: The Way of the Traitor
- Followed by: The Samurai's Wife

The Concubine's Tattoo is the fourth in a series of historical mystery novels by American writer Laura Joh Rowland set in late 17th-century Genroku-era Japan featuring the samurai investigator Sano Ichirō. It was published by St. Martin's Press in 1998.

== Plot ==
The novel opens in the imperial palace at the wedding of Sano Ichirō to his fiancee Reiko, attended by many important nobles including the shogun Tokugawa Tsunayoshi. Just as the wedding ends, the body of the shogun's favorite concubine, Harume, is discovered. Sano, the shogun's Investigator of Events, Situations and People, has his wedding festivities suspended as he is ordered to investigate the death. Although disease is first suspected, Sano soon discovers that Harume was poisoned by ink she used to mark her body with a tattoo. Suspicion falls on a rival concubine, a palace guard infatuated with Harume, a noble who used Harmue in voyeuristic sessions, and the shogun's own mother.

Back at home, Sano discovers that his bride Reiko, rather than being the meek and obedient woman he was expecting, is a clever, restless and adventurous young woman who is trained to use a sword. Reiko demands that she be allowed to help Sano with his investigation, which he initially refuses. When leads go cold, Sano is forced to admit that Reiko may be the key to finding the murderer, although it will put her in the gravest danger.

== Publication history ==
After the success of her debut novel Shinjū, published by HarperTorch in 1994, Laura Joh Rowland continued with Bundori (1995) and The Way of the Traitor (1996), both published by HarperTorch. But critics were disappointed in the third book. (Kirkus Reviews noted there was a certain lack of originality about the plot and Publishers Weekly called Rowland's prose "bland", and the plot "disappointingly predictable".

Rowland switched publishers for her fourth novel, moving to St. Martin's Press. The Concubine's Tattoo was published in 1998. Rowland would go on to write 14 more titles in the Sano Ichiro series.

== Reception ==
Publishers Weekly noted that "Rowland once again delivers a mystery laden with details of period and place, with strong portrayals of palace intrigue in 17th-century Japan." But the reviewer found "The book suffers, as Rowland's previous novels have, from a common hazard of historical mysteries: the pace is weighed down by the very details with which the author so painstakingly bedecks her narrative." Despite that, the conclusion was "Rowland's understanding of the society she depicts shines through, and she succeeds in presenting Sano as an intriguing combination of wiliness and decency, making this a good bet for fans of historicals as well as of mysteries past."

Marilyn Stasio, writing for The New York Times, found the modern sensibilities of the bride Reiko to be a distressing anachronism, writing that this wouldn't have had a chance of happening in feudal Japan, "Not in a million years." Despite this, Stasio admitted "Sano Ichiro's new wife does a pretty job of spying in the palace quarters where the shogun's favorite concubine has been poisoned ingeniously, with the ink she mixed for a tattoo." Stasio also noted, "Rowland has a painter's eye for the minutiae of court life, as well as a politician's ear for intrigue, so the sleuthing is conducted amid sumptuous scenes of imperial excess and under the watch of imperious villains." Stasio concluded, "Although some characters get lost in this panoply of settings, which include a puppet theater, a morgue and a martial arts academy, everyone (especially those who are not to be trusted) is beautifully dressed."
