= The Pillow Book of Lady Wisteria =

2002 novel by Laura Joh Rowland

- Author: Laura Joh Rowland
- Language: English
- Series: Sano Ichirō
- Genre: Historical mystery
- Publisher: St. Martin's Press
- Publication date: 2002
- Publication place: United States
- Preceded by: Black Lotus
- Followed by: The Dragon King's Palace

The Pillow Book of Lady Wisteria is the seventh in a series of historical mystery novels by American writer Laura Joh Rowland, set in late 17th-century Genroku-era Japan featuring the samurai investigator Sano Ichirō. It was published by St. Martin's Press in 2002.

== Plot ==
The shogun's cousin and heir apparent, Mitsuyoshi, has been murdered in Yoshiwara, Edo's pleasure quarter. The outraged Shogun Tsunayoshi has demanded that Sano find the killer immediately. As Sano arrives at the crime scene, he discovers that his rival, Police Chief Commissioner Hoshina, has arrived before him and is determined to solve the case before Sano. Mitsuyoshi had been visiting a high-priced courtesan, Lady Wisteria, and was stabbed through the eye with a woman's long hairpin. Wisteria, a former lover of Sano's whom he met during his first investigation (Shinjū), is missing. In addition to Wisteria, three people are quickly implicated: Momomoko, Wisteria's yarite (chaperone), whose hairpin was the murder weapon; Fujio, a musician who often performed in pleasure houses, and who was an occasional client of Wisteria's; and Nitta, the imperial treasury minister, who was supposed to be Wisteria's client that night before Mitsuyoshi used his superior social position to take his place.

Sano's investigation soon reveals that none of the suspects had either motive or opportunity to kill Mitsuyoshi. Then Hoshina delivers Wisteria's pillow book (personal diary) to the shogun that reveals Sano's affair with Wisteria, but then claims the affair had continued until Sano, in a jealous rage, had threatened to kill her and whichever client she was with. Although Sano immediately claims that the pillow book is a forgery, the shogun threatens to have Sano executed for treason. Sano manages to convince the shogun to give him time to prove his innocence.

A young girl working at the pleasure house reveals that Wisteria sometimes would drug her client, and then admit a secret lover to her bedroom. Sano goes to Hoshina, who was clearly responsible for the incriminating pillow book that threatens Sano's head, and proposes a truce, agreeing that if the murderer is found, Sano will not reveal that Hoshina is the author of the fraudulent pillow book, and Sano will allow Hoshina to claim credit for the arrest. But Hoshina also demands a future favor from Sano, and Sano agrees. With information from Hoshina, Sano locates Wisteria and her lover, a man nicknamed "Lightning". Wisteria confesses that she plotted her escape with Lightning as a way to leave her life as a prostitute, and Lightning confesses that he was angry with Mitsuyoshi for reneging on unpaid debts. Together they plotted Mitsuyoshi's murder, leaving evidence behind to implicate others. With the arrest, Sano's reputation is restored, but his promise to Hoshina about a future favor hangs over his head.

== Publication history ==
Following the success of her debut novel Shinjū, published by HarperTorch in 1994, Laura Joh Rowland created a series of books featuring Sano Ichirō. The Pillow Book of Lady Wisteria is the seventh book of the series, published by St Martin's Press in 2002. Rowland would go on to write eight more titles in the Sano Ichirō series.

== Reception ==
Publishers Weekly noted "Delicate prose and a plot full of the overtones and undercurrents that shade real life push Rowland's latest historical beyond the standard whodunit ... All the animosity and fear in this seamless work is put forth in demure language that perfectly suits the culture Rowland portrays. This character- and atmosphere-driven work is sure to expand Rowland's already large fan base."

Kirkus Reviews commented "Rowland, whose historical backgrounds always flavor Sano's adventures, offers this time a double helping of exotic sexual practices. Readers will have to decide whether such salacious details spice or undercut Sano's struggle to remain honorable in a dishonorable world."

The May 2002 issue of The Internet Writing Journal commented, "The plot is labyrinthine, just like the politics of the time, and Ms. Rowland effortlessly transports the reader back to the 17th century Japan for a very enjoyable time travel experience. Highly recommended."
