= The Samurai's Wife =

2000 historical mystery novel by Laura Joh Rowland

- Author: Laura Joh Rowland
- Language: English
- Series: Sano Ichirō
- Genre: Historical mystery
- Publisher: St. Martin's Press
- Publication date: 2000
- Publication place: United States
- ISBN: 0-312-97448-5
- Preceded by: The Concubine's Tattoo
- Followed by: Black Lotus

The Samurai's Wife is the fifth in a series of historical mystery novels by American writer Laura Joh Rowland, set in late 17th-century Genroku-era Japan featuring the samurai investigator Sano Ichirō. It was published by St. Martin's Press in 2000.

== Plot ==
Sano Ichirō, the shogun's Investigator of Events, Situations and People, is sent to the imperial city of Kyoto to investigate the mysterious death of Konoe Bokuden, a highly placed minister. Sano recognizes that Konoe has been murdered by a powerful scream, an arcane discipline supposedly practised by ancient warriors and thought of as a legend.

But as his investigation progresses, Sano must tread carefully, for the chief suspects are the emperor, the emperor's mother, the emperor's consort, the emperor's disabled cousin, the dead man's wife, and a powerful political rival. Sano has brought his wife Reiko to Kyoto, and she is able to enter the women's quarters in the Imperial palace on the pretext of making social calls, where she subtly interviews suspects. Sano's chief rival, the shogun's chamberlain Yanagisawa, is in Kyoto as well, and Sano must find a way to work with him despite Yanagiswa's duplicity.

As they come closer to uncovering the truth, Sano and Reiko realize that there is more at stake than murder — a rebellion against the shogunate is festering and will soon break into open warfare unless they act quickly and decisively.

== Publication history ==
Following the success of her debut novel Shinjū, published by HarperTorch in 1994, Laura Joh Rowland created a series of books featuring Sano Ichirō. The Samurai's Wife is the fifth book of the series, published by St Martin's Press in 2000. Rowland would go on to write 13 more titles in the Sano Ichirō series.

== Reception ==
Publishers Weekly noted that "With her fifth mystery set in 17th-century Japan, Rowland offers a rich historical that is equal parts police procedural and political thriller." The review concluded, "Rowland delineates the class distinctions of her characters with subtlety and pulls together the strands of her multifaceted plot with enviable grace."

Kirkus Reviews commented "Early on, initiated readers will plod through rote description of societal structure and gender relations in feudal Japan, as newcomers struggle to catch up. Each, though, will soon be whisked through the tale, slowed only occasionally by too-blunt exposition, a too-contemporary colloquialism, or the evocative charms of an exotic setting."

In Issue 13 of The Historical Novels Review, Rachel Hyde noted, "Normally the most absorbing aspect of even a historical whodunit is the plot, but in Rowland’s superb Sano and Reiko series her spellbindingly exotic descriptions of 17th century Japan are every bit as interesting as her teasing plots." Hyde approved of Rowland's approach in explaining the exotic setting, saying, "Most people reading this story are not familiar with 17th century Japan, and it would be all too easy to adopt a didactic style and lose the reader by skimping on plot and imparting too much information. Rowland never does this, though, and the result is a thrilling tale set in a splendidly authentic and well-realised milieu." Hyde concluded, "Honorable Sano, intrepid, brave Reiko, and scheming Yanagisawa are a formidable trio to equal any in crime fiction – a samurai Holmes, Watson and Moriarty? No – something more original than that. Great to see somebody breaking away from familiar settings and trying something different."

Michelle Calabro Hubbard, writing for Book Reporter, noted that "The sights, sounds, and smells of ancient Japan are such a presence in Ms. Rowland's work that it is as if the country is another character. You can actually see a beautifully costumed samurai as he proudly rides his horse down the busy streets of Edo." Hubbard concluded, "The Samurai's Wife is more than just a richly described travelogue, it is also a well-crafted mystery that keeps you guessing up until the end."
