= Black Lotus (novel) =

2001 historical mystery novel by Laura Joh Rowland

- Author: Laura Joh Rowland
- Language: English
- Series: Sano Ichirō
- Genre: Historical mystery
- Publisher: St. Martin's Press
- Publication date: 2001
- Publication place: United States
- ISBN: 0-312-26872-6
- Preceded by: The Samurai's Wife
- Followed by: The Pillow Book of Lady Wisteria

Black Lotus is the sixth in a series of historical mystery novels by American writer Laura Joh Rowland, set in late 17th-century Genroku-era Japan featuring the samurai investigator Sano Ichirō. It was published by St. Martin's Press in 2001.

== Plot ==
A fire destroys a building in the compound of the Buddhist sect known as Black Lotus, and three bodies are discovered inside the building, all of them murdered before the fire was set. The shogun sends Sano Ichirō, his Investigator of Events, Situations and People, and Sano quickly determines that one of the dead people is Oyama Jushin, a chief police commander. But the identities of the woman and the two-year-old child are unknown, and the Black Lotus sect denies knowing who they are.

A young girl, Haru, was found hiding near the fire, but refuses to answer any of Sano's questions, becoming hysterical instead. Sano asks his wife Reiko to interview Haru, who tells Reiko she is an orphan who joined the Black Lotus sect after her parents died. She led a happy life in the sect, and doesn't remember what happened the night of the fire, but her body is covered with bruises. Reiko also interviews the head nun, the head of security and the cult's doctor, and leaves convinced that none of them are telling the entire truth about the Black Lotus sect. On her way out of the compound, a young monk, Pious Truth, comes out of hiding and tells her that the Black Lotus sect hides many dark secrets. Young monks like him are starved and beaten, young nuns are sexually abused, young children are kidnapped and hidden away in underground chambers, and the entire sect is preparing for a religious apocalypse. Before Pious Truth can tell Reiko anything else, he is dragged away by Black Lotus monks.

When Reiko reports these things to Sano, he is unconvinced. He finds Haru's story of not being able to remember the events of the fire the usual story told by guilty people. Sano also believes that the story told by Pious Truth of abuse, underground chambers and kidnappings a fantastical invention. A rift develops between Sano, who believes Haru is guilty of murder and arson, and Reiko, who believes Haru is innocent. Both have a passion for the truth, which now threatens to tear their marriage apart.

As Sano investigates further, he discovers that Haru is not an orphan, but that she had been married to an abusive husband who had died in a mysterious house fire. This strengthens Sano's resolve that Haru is guilty of arson and murder. But he also uncovers stories about young children disappearing after Black Cult monks have visited the neighbourhood, further confusing the issue.

Sano puts Haru on trial for arson and confronts her with both her parents, and the truth about her past. Haru breaks down and confesses that she killed Chief Police Constable Oyama Jushin after he sexually assaulted her, but she says she ran from the building afterwards and denies setting the fire or killing the woman and child. She confirms the stories of sexual and physical abuse of young members of the cult, and she describes a network of underground tunnels and chambers.

Sano immediately marches on the Black Lotus compound with a force of soldiers, and takes Haru, accompanied by Reiko, to show him the underground chambers. However, when they arrive, Sano's force is attacked by hundreds of fanatical Black Lotus believers. In the confusion, Haru escapes and enters an underground tunnel, followed by Reiko. Sano pursues them, setting up a final confrontation with the Black Lotus leadership, where the real murderer and arsonist is revealed, and the evil plot to instigate a religious uprising is thwarted.

== Publication history ==
Following the success of her debut novel Shinjū, published by HarperTorch in 1994, Laura Joh Rowland created a series of books featuring Sano Ichirō. Black Lotus is the sixth book of the series, published by St Martins Press in 2001. Rowland would go on to write nine more titles in the Sano Ichirō series.

== Reception ==
Publishers Weekly called this the latest installment in Rowland's "outstanding series set in Shogun-era Japan." PW noted "The question of religious cults and the abuse of their influence gives this story contemporary resonance" and concluded, "Well-developed characters, a complex, absorbing plot and rich historical detail should help win the author, the daughter of Chinese and Korean immigrants, many new readers as well as a place on mystery bestseller lists."

Kirkus Reviews commented "In a final confrontation that makes Waco look like a throwback to the shogunate, Haru, the Ichiro family, and the Black Lotus Temple finally show their true colors. Honor and spiritual emptiness have a suspiciously contemporary feel in a mystery that can't decide which is more dangerous: love or the coming apocalypse"

In Issue 19 of The Historical Novels Review, Suzanne Crane noted, "Rowland’s latest novel of 17th century Japan will not disappoint her readers." Crane commented, "As with her previous novels, Rowland superbly portrays life in feudal Japan. The rigid societal structure is tested in the course of Reiko's investigation and the danger to Sano's honor is keenly felt. Buddhist temple life and religious fervor are beautifully described." Crane concluded, "Rowland’s talent is wide-ranging: to imbue her characters with powerful traits, to plot suspense beautifully and to entertain while teaching."

In the June 2001 issue of The Internet Writing Journal, Claire E. White commented, "Rowland will keep you guessing until the very last page as to Haru's motivations, and hoping that Reiko and Sano can find a way to patch up their marriage." White concluded, "This is another fascinating entry in an excellent historical series."
