= The Dragon King's Palace =

2003 historical mystery novel by Laura Joh Rowland

- Author: Laura Joh Rowland
- Language: English
- Series: Sano Ichirō
- Genre: Historical mystery
- Publisher: St. Martin's Press
- Publication date: 2003
- Publication place: United States
- Preceded by: The Pillow Book of Lady Wisteria
- Followed by: The Perfumed Sleeve

The Dragon King's Palace is the eighth in a series of historical mystery novels by American writer Laura Joh Rowland, set in late 17th-century Genroku-era Japan featuring the samurai investigator Sano Ichirō. It was published by St. Martin's Press in 2003.

== Plot ==
Lady Keisho-in, the mother of the shogun, forces Sano's wife Reiko, as well as the wife of Sano's biggest rival, Lady Yanigasawa, and Midori, pregnant wife of Sano's assistant, Hirata, to accompany her on a pilgrimage to Mount Fuji. En route, the ladies are kidnapped by the soldiers of a mysterious bandit who calls himself the Dragon King.

As Sano desperately tries to find any clues as to Reiko's location before she is killed, the shogun holds execution over his head unless he can produce immediate results, court politics muddy the waters, and captive Reiko wonders how far she is willing to go to enable an escape from the Dragon King.

== Publication history ==
Following the success of her debut novel Shinjū, published by HarperTorch in 1994, Laura Joh Rowland created a series of books featuring Sano Ichirō. The Dragon King's Palace is the eighth book of the series, published by St Martin's Press in 2003. Rowland would go on to write seven more titles in the Sano Ichirō series.

== Reception ==
Publishers Weekly noted "Rowland's masterful evocation of the period enables the reader to identify with the universal human emotions and drives that propel her characters while absorbing numerous telling details of a different culture and era."

Kirkus Reviews called this "A lively dissection of the samurai code of honor, sexual dishonor, palace infighting, and ancient Japanese mores."

The June–July 2003 issue of The Internet Writing Journal commented, "Laura Joh Rowland brings the people and customs of ancient Japan to life. From the bold Reiko to the dangerously psychotic Lady Yanagisawa to the weak and vacillating Shogun, Ms. Rowland skillfully creates characters with depth and complexity."
