= British Museum Reading Room =

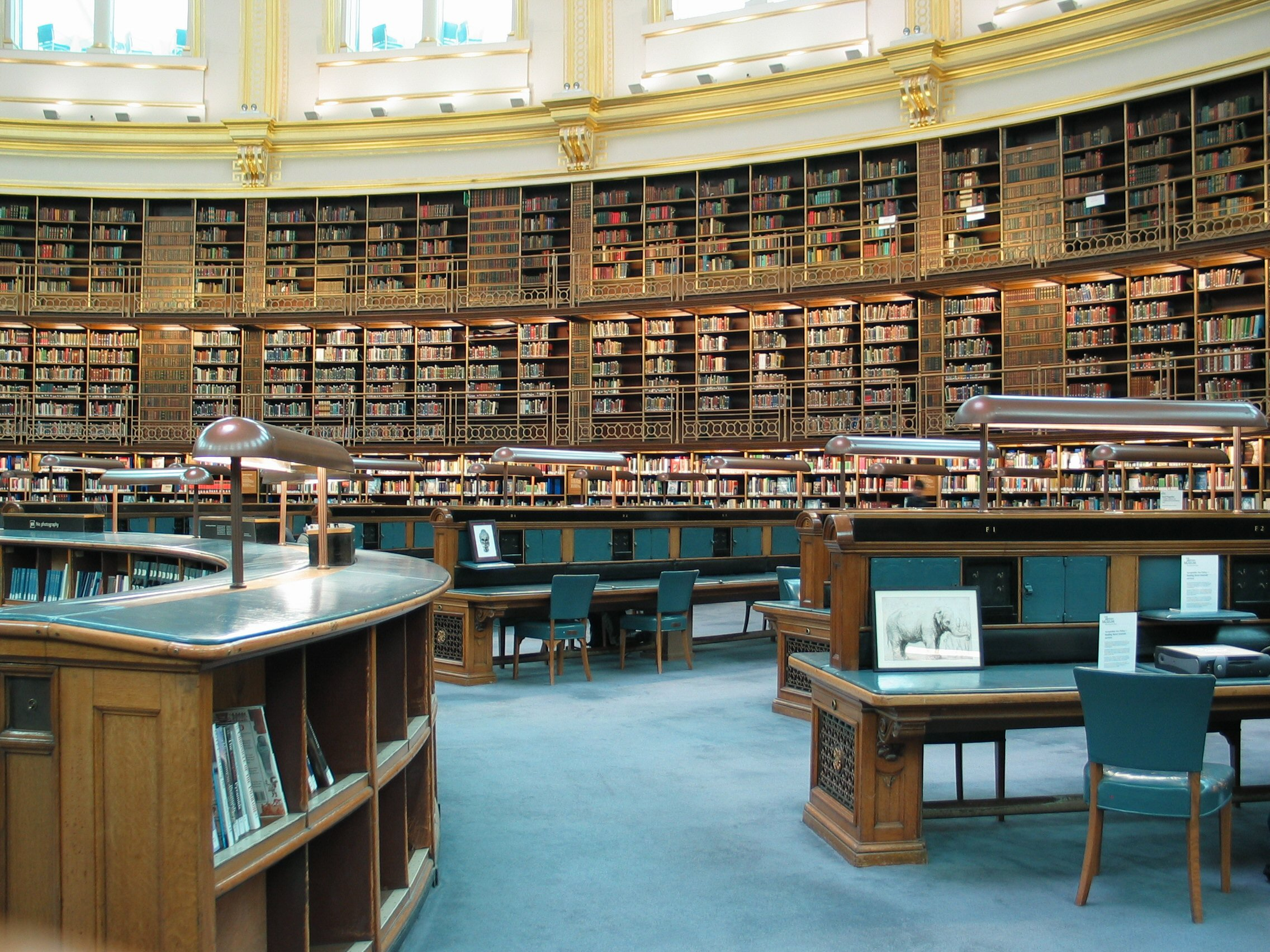
- Inside the Reading Room, before its conversion to an exhibition space
- Interactive map of the British Museum Reading Room area

General information
- Location: Bloomsbury, London, United Kingdom
- Coordinates: 51°31′10″N 00°07′37″W
- Construction started: 1854
- Completed: 1857

Technical details
- Structural system: Segmented domed

Design and construction
- Architect: Sydney Smirke

The British Museum Reading Room, situated in the centre of the Great Court of the British Museum, used to be the main reading room of the British Library. In 1997, this function moved to the new British Library building at St Pancras, London, but the Reading Room remains in its original form at the British Museum.

Designed by Sydney Smirke and opened in 1857, the Reading Room was in continual use until its temporary closure for renovation in 1997. It was reopened in 2000, and from 2007 to 2017 it was used to stage temporary exhibitions. The reading room was closed to the public again in 2013 and converted for use as the museum's archive. It was reopened for guided tours in 2023, and reopened for general visitors in July 2024.

== History ==
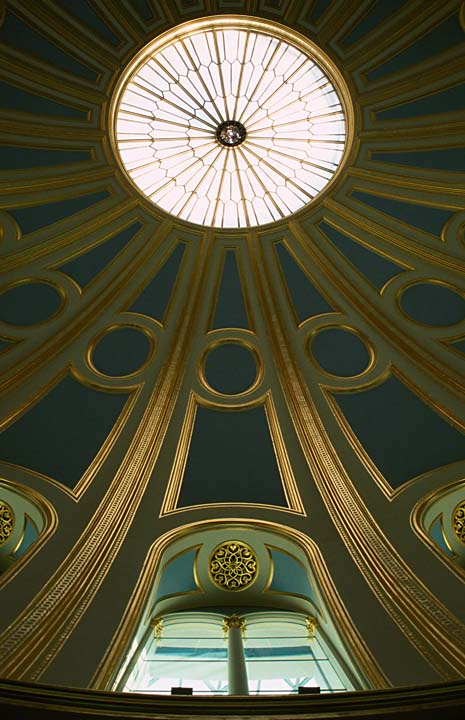
Detail of the ceiling with its oculus

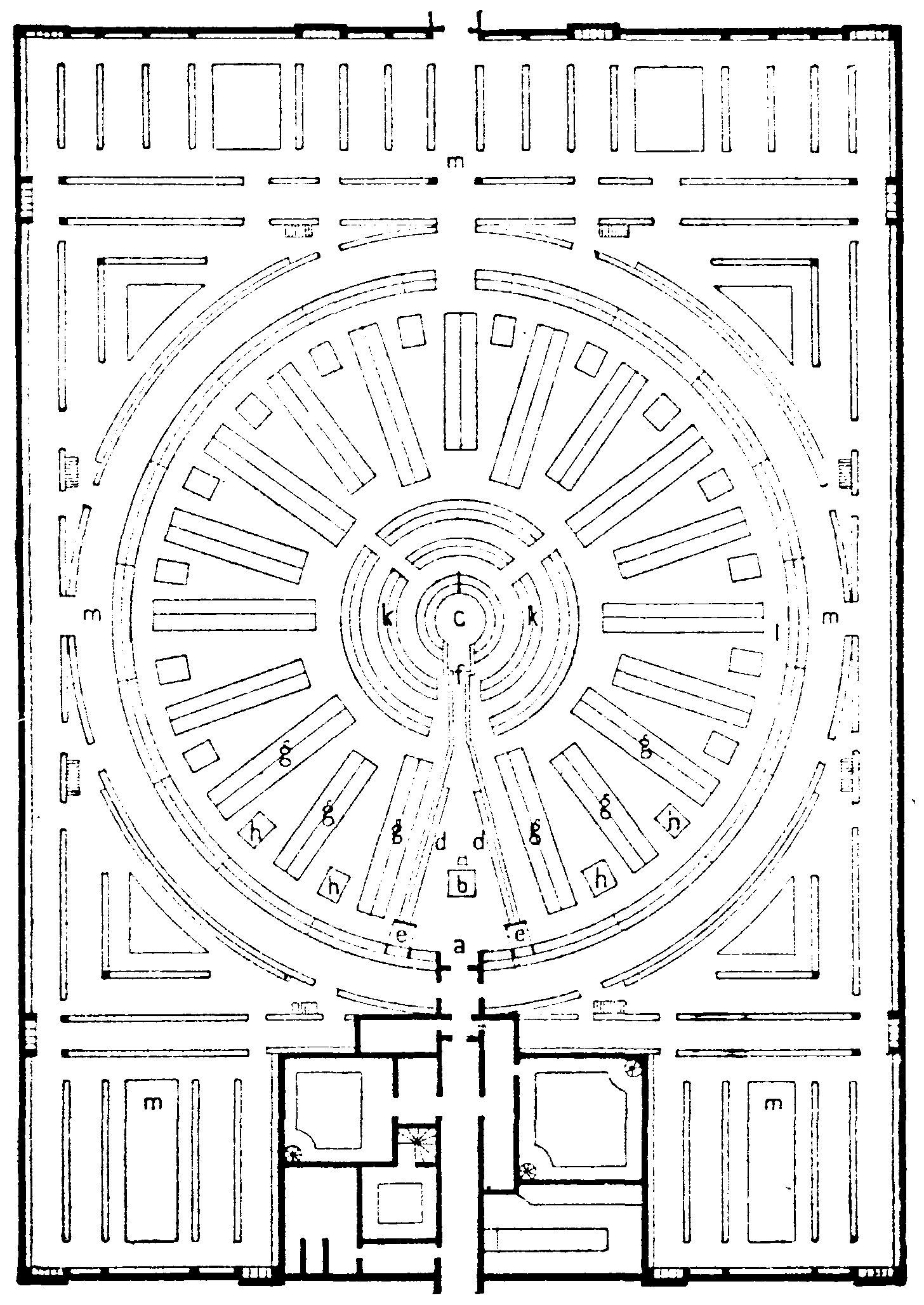
A plan of the desks and book storage in the room

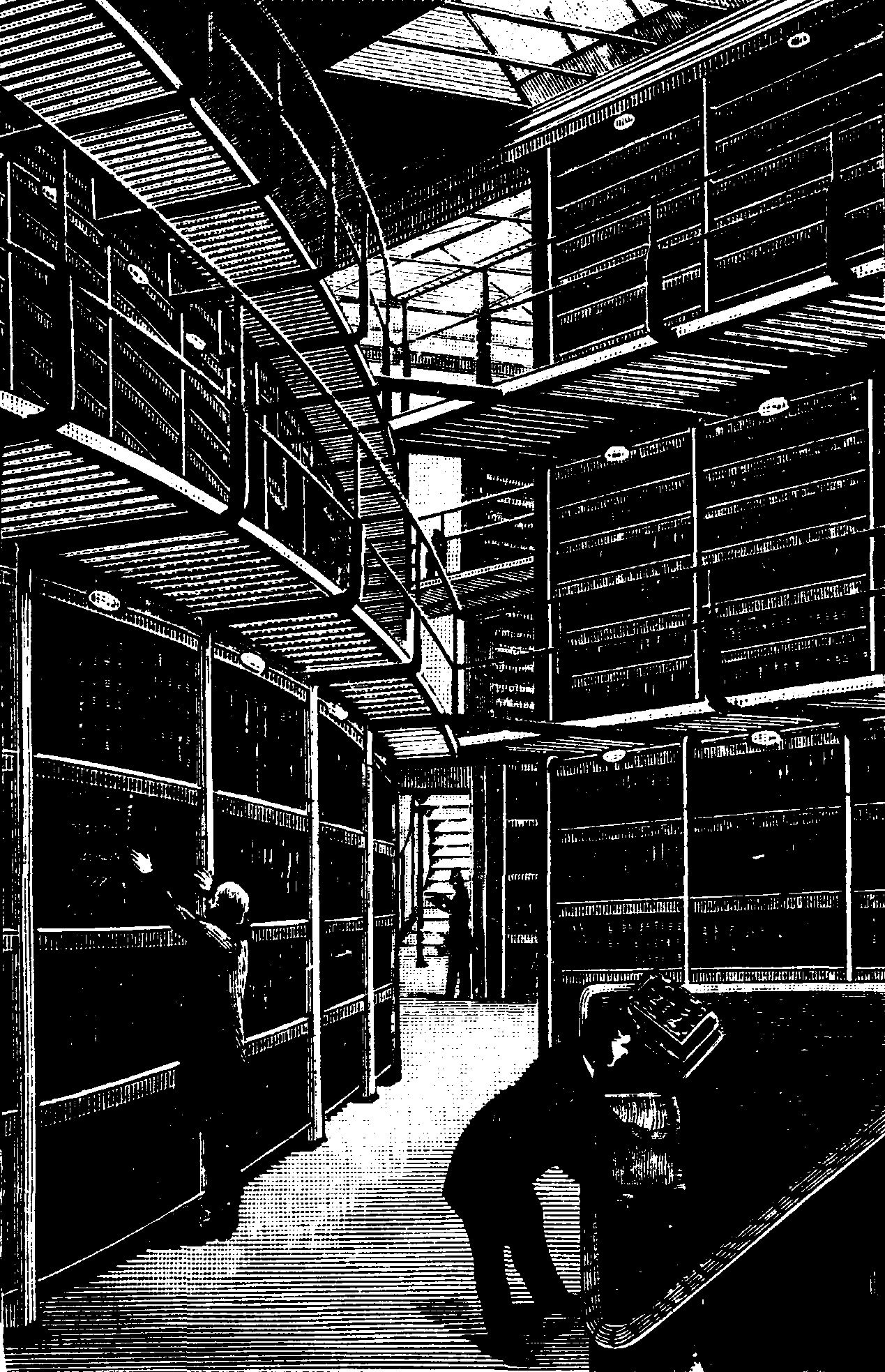
An illustration of the old book stacks in the museum before their removal

=== Construction and design ===
In the early 1850s the museum library was in need of a larger reading room and the then-Keeper of Printed Books, Antonio Panizzi, following an earlier competition idea by William Hosking, came up with the thought of a round room in the central courtyard. The building was designed by Sydney Smirke and was constructed between 1854 and 1857. The building used cast iron, concrete, glass and the latest technology in ventilation and heating. The dome, inspired by the Pantheon in Rome, has a diameter of 42.6 metres but is not technically free standing: constructed in segments on cast iron, the ceiling is suspended and made out of papier-mâché. Book stacks built around the reading room were made of iron to take the huge weight and add fire protection. There were forty kilometres of shelving in the stacks prior to the library's relocation to the new site.

The reading room is one of the inspirations for design of the La Trobe Reading room in the State Library of Victoria in Melbourne.

=== British Museum Library ===
The Reading Room was officially opened on 2 May 1857 with a 'breakfast' (that included champagne and ice cream) laid out on the catalogue desks. A public viewing was held between 8 and 16 May, attracting over 62,000 visitors. Tickets to it included a plan of the library.

Regular users had to apply in writing and be issued a reader's ticket by the Principal Librarian. During the period of the British Library, access was restricted to registered researchers only; however, reader's credentials were generally available to anyone who could show that they were a serious researcher. The Reading Room was used by a large number of famous figures, including notably Sun Yat-sen, Karl Marx, Oscar Wilde, Friedrich Hayek, Marcus Garvey, Bram Stoker, Mahatma Gandhi, Rudyard Kipling, George Orwell, George Bernard Shaw, Mark Twain, Vladimir Lenin (using the name Jacob Richter), Virginia Woolf, Arthur Rimbaud, Muhammad Ali Jinnah, H. G. Wells, and Arthur Conan Doyle.

In 1973, the British Library Act 1972 detached the library department from the British Museum, but it continued to host the now separated British Library in the same Reading Room and building as the museum until 1997.

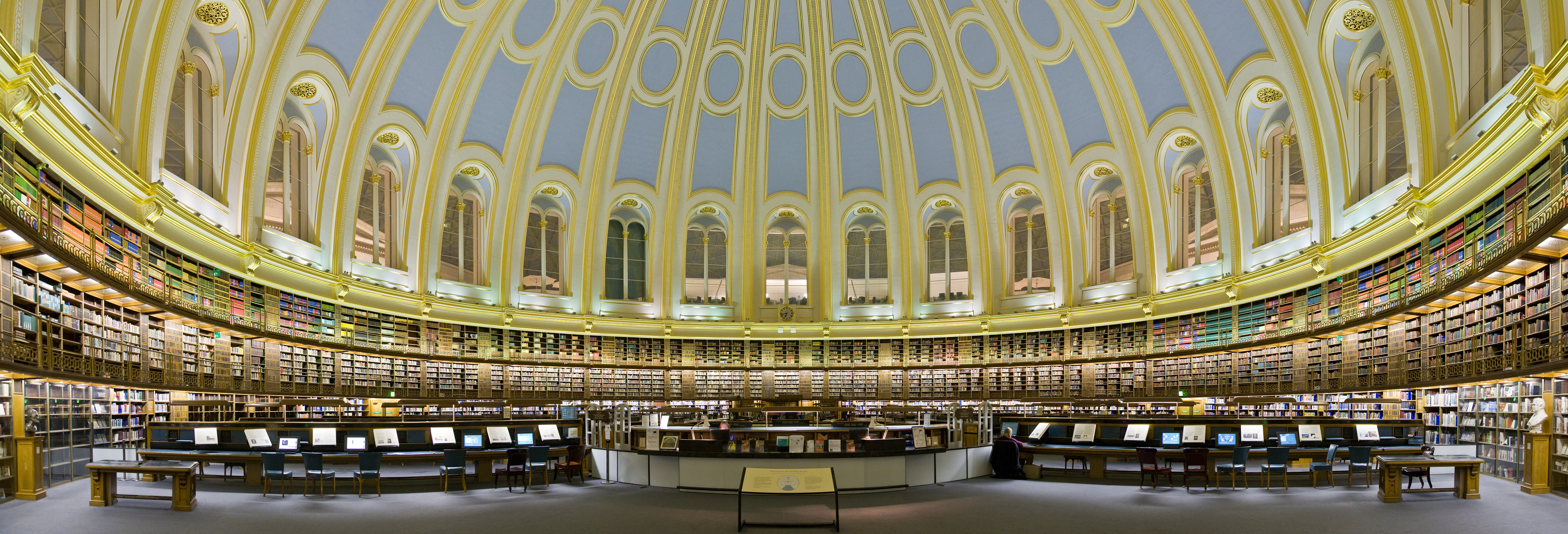
A panorama showing an almost 180-degree view of the interior of the Reading Room

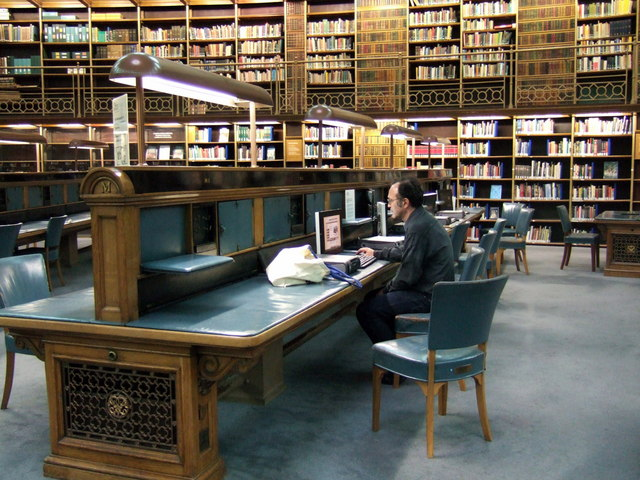
The reading desks

=== Restoration ===
In 1997 the British Library moved to its own specially constructed building next to St Pancras railway station and all the books and shelving were removed. As part of the redevelopment of the Great Court, the Reading Room was fully renovated and restored, including the papier-mâché ceiling which was repaired to its original colour scheme, having previously undergone radical redecorations (the initial design of the roof was considered excessive at the time).

The Reading Room was reopened in 2000, allowing all visitors, not just library ticket-holders, to enter it. It held a collection of 25,000 books focusing on the cultures represented in the museum along with an information centre and the Walter and Leonore Annenberg Centre.

=== Exhibition space ===
In 2007 the books and facilities installed in 2000 were removed, and the Reading Room was relaunched as a venue for special exhibitions, beginning with one featuring China's Terracotta Army. The general library for visitors, Paul Hamlyn Library, was moved to a room accessible through nearby Room 2, but closed permanently on 13 August 2011. This is an earlier library that has also had distinguished users, including Thomas Babington Macaulay, William Makepeace Thackeray, Robert Browning, Giuseppe Mazzini, Charles Darwin, and Charles Dickens.

A selection of past exhibitions:

Exhibit	From	To
The First Emperor: China's Terracotta Army	13 September 2007	6 April 2008
Hadrian: Empire and Conflict	24 July 2008	27 October 2008
Shah ʿAbbas: The Remaking of Iran	19 February 2009	14 June 2009
Indian Summer	May 2009	September 2009
Montezuma: Aztec Ruler	24 September 2009	24 January 2010
Italian Renaissance drawings	22 April 2010	25 July 2010
Ancient Egyptian Book of the Dead: Journey Through the Afterlife	4 November 2010	6 March 2011
Treasures of Heaven: Saints, Relics and Devotion in Medieval Europe	23 June 2011	9 October 2011
Hajj: Journey to the Heart of Islam	26 January 2012	15 April 2012
Shakespeare: staging the world	19 July 2012	25 November 2012
Life and death in Pompeii and Herculaneum	28 March 2013	29 September 2013
Vikings: life and legend	6 March 2014	22 June 2014
Ancient lives, new discoveries	22 May 2014	12 July 2015
Germany: memories of a nation	16 October 2014	25 January 2015
Indigenous Australia: enduring civilisations	23 April 2015	2 August 2015
Drawing in silver and gold: Leonardo to Jasper Johns	10 September 2015	6 December 2015
Celts: art and identity	24 September 2015	31 January 2016
Egypt: faith after the pharaohs	29 October 2015	7 February 2016
Sunken Cities: Egypt's lost worlds	19 May 2016	27 November 2016
Hokusai: beyond the Great Wave	25 May 2017	13 August 2017

=== Closure and reopening ===
In 2013, the Reading Room was again closed to the public, this time indefinitely. With its role as an exhibition space superseded by the newer purpose-built World Conservation and Exhibitions Centre, the Reading Room was converted for use as the museum's archive. It was briefly reopened in 2018, but for a series of concerts and not for its original purpose. For the rest of the 2010s and early 2020s, the Reading Room remained closed to the public, and museum officials were in discussions on what to do with the space.

In 2023, the Reading Room reopened to the public for guided tours. The tours, which are free, last approximately 20 minutes and must be booked in advance. Only one tour is conducted each week, at a specific time on a specific day; during the first wave of tours in March and April 2023, tours only ran on Tuesdays at 11:30 am. Visitors are monitored during the tour and are not permitted to borrow books or take photographs in the Reading Room.

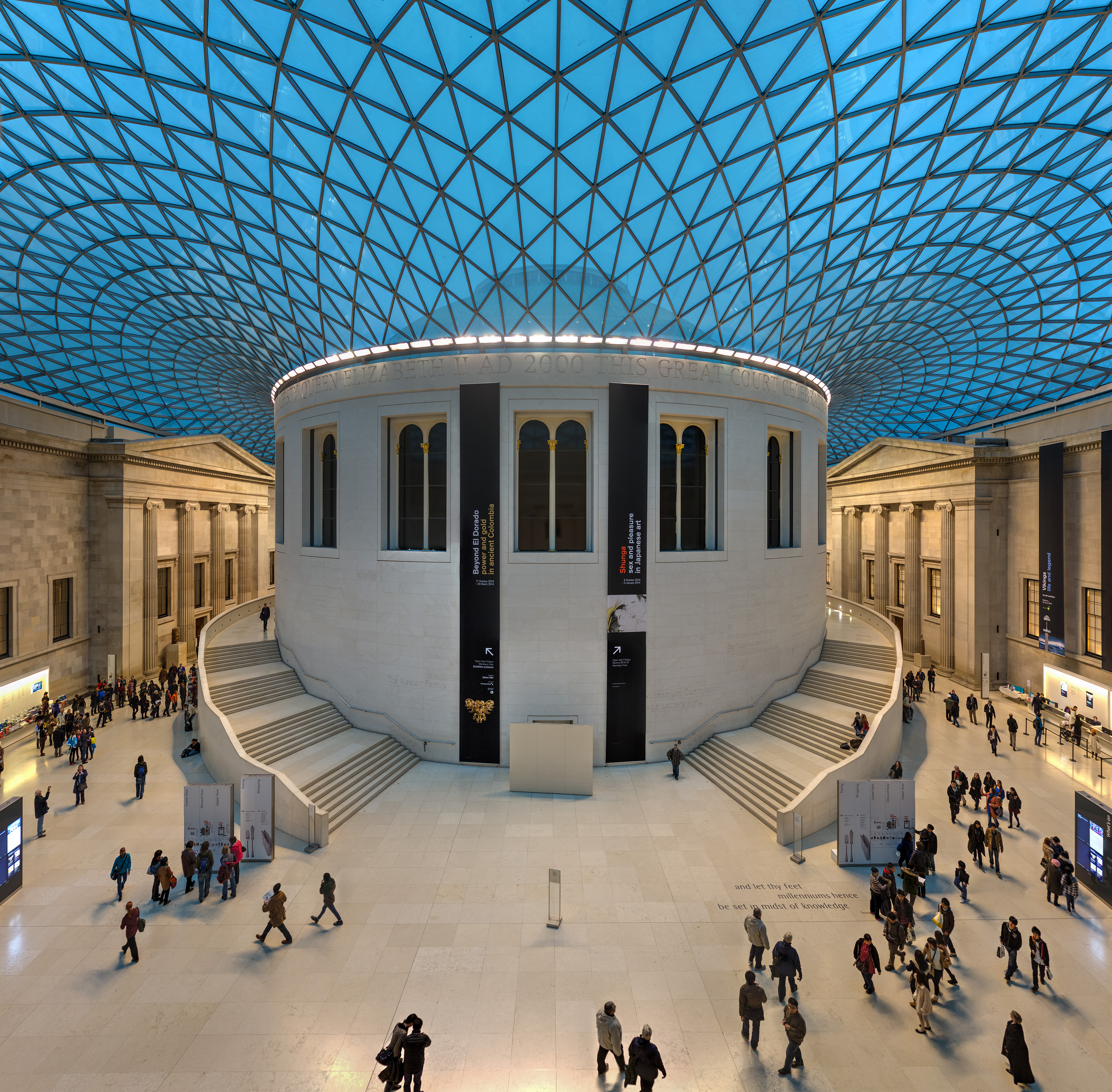
The exterior of the Reading Room in the Great Court

== References in art and popular culture ==
The British Museum Reading Room is the subject of an eponymous poem, "The British Museum Reading Room", by Louis MacNeice. Much of the action of David Lodge's 1965 novel The British Museum Is Falling Down takes place in the old Reading Room. The 'Glass Ceiling' of Anabel Donald's 1994 novel is the ceiling of the Reading Room, where the denouement is set.

Alfred Hitchcock used the Reading Room and the dome of the British Museum as a location for the climax of his first sound film Blackmail (1929). Other movies with key scenes in the Reading Room include Night of the Demon (1957) and in the 2001 Japanese anime OVA Read or Die, the Room is used as a secret entrance to the British Library's fictional "Special Operations Division".

In Sir Max Beerbohm's short story, Enoch Soames, first published in May 1916, an obscure writer makes a deal with the Devil to visit the Reading Room one hundred years in the future, in order to know what posterity thinks about him and his work.

The British Museum and the Reading Room serve as the settings for An Encounter at the Museum, an anthology of romance novellas by Claudia Dain and Deb Marlowe, among others.

Virginia Woolf made reference to the British Museum Reading Room in a passage from her 1929 essay, A Room of One's Own. She wrote, "The swing doors swung open, and there one stood under the vast dome as if one were a thought in the huge bald forehead which is so splendidly encircled by a band of famous names."

Richard Henry Dana Jr. visited the Reading Room on 10 September 1860 with his London friend Henry T. Parker, and reported that

Parker calls & takes me to the British Museum, to see the Reading Room, wh. has been built since 1856 [Dana's prior visit]. It is the room where students & readers have their desks, & consult the textbooks, cyclopedias, catalogs &c., & from wh. they send orders for books to the Library – the Library not being visited, at all, for study. There is no such room as this in Europe. It is a circle, with a dome, lighted from above, & its diameter is 4 feet greater than that of the dome of St. Paul's. The autographs are now open to the view of all, spread out in glass cases, – as well as much other lit. curiosities. This is the grandest Literary & Scientific institution (not for instruction) in the world. The Reading Room, I told Parker, was a temple to the deification of Bibliology.

The writer Bernard Falk (1882–1960) quotes the British historian Thomas Carlyle (1795–1881) as having declared that the Reading Room of the British Museum was a convenient asylum for imbeciles whose friends wished them out of mischief's way.

The exterior of the Reading Room featured in the 2001 Hindi-language film, Kabhi Khushi Kabhie Gham. The song sequence Deewana Hai Dekho, which featured Hrithik Roshan and Kareena Kapoor, was partly shot in the Great Court.
