= The Snow Empress =

2007 novel by Laura Joh Rowland

- Front Cover
- Author: Laura Joh Rowland
- Cover artist: Pete Garceau (Jacket Design), Temple photograph © Panoramic Images, Empress photograph courtesy of Veer.com
- Language: English
- Series: Sano Ichirō
- Genre: Detective, Mystery
- Publisher: St. Martin's Minotaur
- Publication date: November 2007
- Media type: hardback
- Pages: 293
- ISBN: 0-312-36542-X
- OCLC: 154309118
- Dewey Decimal: 813/.54 22
- LC Class: PS3568.O934 S66 2007
- Preceded by: The Red Chrysanthemum
- Followed by: The Fire Kimono

The Snow Empress is a 2007 mystery novel written by Laura Joh Rowland, set in the Genroku (AD 1688–1704) of historical Japan It is the 12th book in the Sano Ichirō series.

It combines a murder mystery with a portrayal of the strained, and often xenophobic relations between the Japanese rulers and the aboriginal inhabitants of Hokkaido, the Ainu (then called the Ezo).

== Plot summary ==
The prologue begins in autumn of 1699, with the murder of an unidentified woman in Hokkaido, followed by the kidnapping of Sano Masahiro, son of the Shogun's Lord Chamberlain, Sano Ichiro, at the autumn festivities at the Zōjō Temple in Edo city.

Several months later, Sano is summoned by the shogun to undertake a mission. Lord Matsumae (松前矩広), who administers the country's northernmost domain, has failed to report to the capital as scheduled, and messengers despatched to Hokkaido have not returned. With tensions rising between Sano and his rival, Lord Matsudaira, the last thing Sano wants is to leave Edo, but Matsudaira produces the piece of a toy sword belonging to Masahiro: it seems Matsudaira's agents have sent Sano's son north, leaving him no choice but to go to Ezogashima.

Left with little choice, Sano departs, accompanied by a small retinue, including his wife Reiko, his chief retainer Hirata (平田), and "The Rat", an Ezo migrant to Edo. Hirata had been training with an ancient martial arts mystic when he sensed Sano was in trouble. He also sensed that the attainment of the next level of mastery which had eluded him would be found in the mission.

The mission was almost over before it began when their ship was wrecked off the coast of Hokkaido. The survivors were found and sheltered by local natives who refer to themselves as the Ainu instead of the derisive term Ezo used by the Japanese. The Ainu were much spiritually closer to their natural world than the Japanese, and in there Hirata sensed the key to his breakthrough.

When Sano finally managed to get an audience with Lord Matsumae in his court at his castle in Fukuyama, he found the daimyō half-mad with grief at the unsolved murder of his favourite concubine, who was an Ainu native.

In order to locate and rescue his son, Sano agreed to investigate the murder to find the real culprit. He was simultaneously assisted and hindered by the daimyo's retainers, who on the one hand had little regard for the concubine for her perceived barbaric background, and on the other hand, desired their master's return to normalcy.

As the story developed, Sano and his friends got a first-hand glimpse on the little-known effects of the impacts and clashes of the "civilised" Japanese people intruding into the lives of the natives who were of very different backgrounds and views of the world.
