= The Way of the Traitor =

1997 novel by Laura Joh Rowland

- Author: Laura Joh Rowland
- Series: Sano Ichirō
- Genre: Historical mystery
- Publisher: HarperTorch
- Publication date: 1997
- Publication place: United States
- ISBN: 0-06-101090-1
- Preceded by: Bundori
- Followed by: The Concubine's Tattoo

The Way of the Traitor is the third novel by American writer Laura Joh Rowland in her historical mystery series set in 1690 Genroku-era Japan featuring the samurai investigator Sano Ichirō. It was published by HarperTorch in 1997.

== Plot ==
Sano Ichirō, who saved the life of the shogun Tokugawa Tsunayoshi in the first novel of this series, Shinjū, has become the shogun's Investigator of Events, Situations and People, allowing the shogun to send Sano to investigate anything that takes the shogun's fancy. But in the second novel of the series, Bundori, Sano ran afoul of Yanagisawa Yoshiyasu, the shogun's chamberlain and the real power behind the throne, who is jealous of the shogun's delight with Sano and his detective abilities. At the start of the novel, the shogun suffers from a brief illness, and Chamberlain Yanagisawa, ruling in his stead, sends Sano and his assistant Hirata to the distant port of Nagasaki on a pointless official inspection tour. Nagasaki is the only Japanese port where European goods can be imported, and only by Dutch traders, who are confined to an island outside of the port.

Sano and Hirata arrive in Nagasaki on the day when the body of one of the Dutch traders is discovered washed up on the shore. Sano, who sees his inspection tour as a waste of time, offers to investigate the murder. Sano is drawn into the world of trade within the port, and soon learns that despite the official walls that supposedly separate the Dutch "barbarians" from Japanese society, the lucrative smuggling of goods into the port is a way of life.

After interviews with the other Dutch traders and the dead man's concubine, and examination of the body, Sano states his belief that the Dutch trader was not killed by a fellow Dutch trader but by a Japanese citizen. With this news, the captain of a recently arrived Dutch ship threatens to fire on the city unless Sano produces the murderer.

Sano suspects that the murder is linked to smuggling, and that top city officials are involved. But as he digs deeper, Sano is put on trial on trumped-up charges of treason. Because of his high office, he will be tried by a triad of regional judges, who will take several days to reach the city. Sano must now race against time to discover the murderer before he is brought to trial and before the Dutch ship can start an international war.

The list of suspects is lengthy, including the dead man's courtesan, the captain of the island guards, the chief of police, and a Chinese priest whose brother was killed by the dead trader several decades ago.

The three judges arrive at the city, and Sano is put on trial. He is about to be found guilty due to perjured testimony and faces immediate execution when his assistant Hirata arrives with the location of the next smuggling operation. Sano convinces the judges to come with him and uncover the real head of the smuggling operation. Together they uncover who is responsible for the smuggling, and who the murderer is.

Shortly afterwards, official word reaches Nagasaki that the shogun has recovered from his illness and has ordered the immediate recall of Sano to Edo.

== Publication history ==
After the success of her first two Sano Ichirō novels, Laura Joh Rowland wrote a third installment, The Way of the Traitor, which was published by HarperTorch in 1997. Rowland would go on to write 15 more titles in the Sano Ichirō series.

== Reception ==
Kirkus Reviews noted there was a certain lack of originality about this plot: "tension rides high as Rowland takes every cliche of the One Just Man genre — the civic conspiracy, the prostitute in love, the impossible deadline, the massacre of innocents, the man on the run — and refracts them all through the code of Bushido."

Publishers Weekly was also disappointed by this novel, commenting, "The collision of East and West is compelling, but Rowland's bland prose and disappointingly predictable solution ill serve her story's central conflict."
