= Karen Kay =

Karen Kay may refer to:

- Karen Kay (author)
- Karen Kay (TV personality)
