= The Fire Kimono =

2008 novel by Laura Joh Rowland

- Front Cover
- Author: Laura Joh Rowland
- Cover artist: David Baldeosingh (Jacket Design), woman's head photograph © F Perri, SI / PI 2008, kimono photograph © Image99 / Jupiterimages, beach photograph © Hill State Studies LLC / Jupiterimages
- Language: English
- Series: Sano Ichirō
- Genre: Detective, Mystery
- Publisher: St. Martin's Minotaur
- Publication date: November 2008
- Media type: hardback
- Pages: 297
- ISBN: 0-312-37948-X
- OCLC: 223884641
- Dewey Decimal: 813/.54 22
- LC Class: PS3568.O934 F57 2008
- Preceded by: The Snow Empress

The Fire Kimono is a 2008 mystery novel written by Laura Joh Rowland, set in the Genroku period (AD 1688–1704) in Japan. It is the 13th book in the Sano Ichirō series.

This time, Sano is assigned to a sensitive murder investigation more than four decades old involving a member of the Tokugawa clan, cousin to his lord Shogun Tokugawa Tsunayoshi. The murder apparently occurred during the historical Great Fire of Meireki that destroyed much of Edo city and took the lives of many people in the confusion. Sano is shocked when his mother becomes embroiled in the case as a primary suspect and learns there is much more to her than he had ever imagined.

Meanwhile, the tension between Sano and Lord Matsudaira reaches a boiling point and they are on the verge of open warfare, a situation brought about by the manipulation of Yanagisawa Yoshiyasu who had earlier escaped from exile.

== Plot summary ==
In the prologue, a Shinto priest passing by discovers remains of a human unearthed when strong winds toppled an oak tree near the Inari Shrine.

Since his return from Ezogashima, there had been increases in attacks against Sano and against Matsudaira, the attackers wearing insignias from each other's houses. Just as Sano confronts Matsudaira about the latest attack on Sano's wife, Reiko, which Matsudaira flatly denies, both men are summoned by the Shogun.

The shogun informs them that the skeleton of his long-lost cousin, Tokugawa Tadatoshi, who was thought to have perished during the Great Fire of Meireki, has been found and charges Sano with the investigation.

Sano barely has time to plan his investigation when his mother, Etsuko, is arrested by Matsudaira's men as a suspect in the murder of Tadatoshi. The witness is Colonel Doi Naokatsu in the service of Matsudaira. Doi was also apparently once Tadatoshi's bodyguard, and Etsuko was a lady-in-waiting to Tadatoshi's household women. Sano is shocked that his mother is not a humble commoner as he had thought, but a scion of the Kumazawa clan, a respected hereditary Tokugawa vassal. Doi claimed to have heard Etsuko plotting with Egen against Tadatoshi, Egen being a monk and Tadatoshi's tutor.

Sano is able to convince the shogun to allow him bring Etsuko home to facilitate the investigation, but he is dismayed to find his mother less than cooperative. As more and more of the past is uncovered, his mother's position becomes more and more unfavorable.

Meanwhile, confined to the security of the house due to danger of attacks, Reiko is at last able to help in the investigation by trying to get more information from Etsuko, and from Etsuko's loyal longtime maid, Hana. Reiko is also struggling to win back the affections of her young daughter, Akiko, who became alienated from Reiko when Reiko and her husband left her behind to go to Ezogashima to rescue her son, Masahiro, as told in the previous novel (The Snow Empress).

Sano's trusted assistant Hirata also returns from a long absence to find that his wife and children have become strangers to him.

Amidst the investigation, Yanagisawa plots with his son Yoritomo to bring down both Sano and Matsudaira.
