= James Clark McKerrow =

British physician and philosopher (1887-1965)

- Born: 21 May 1887; Workington
- Died: 1965 (aged 77–78)
- Occupation(s): Physician, philosopher

James Clark McKerrow (21 May 1887 – 1965) was a British physician and philosopher.

== Biography ==
McKerrow was born on 21 May 1887 in Workington. He was educated at University of Edinburgh and obtained his M.B. in 1912. During World War I he served in the Territorial Force but after being wounded joined family medical practice in Workington. McKerrow dedicated much of his life to studying evolution, philosophy, psychology and religious experiences. He studied at the British Museum Reading Room and filled 500 notebooks with his ideas. He wrote numerous philosophical and psychology books.

McKerrow was an original thinker and held unorthodox opinions about different subjects. In his book Religion and History, he argued that there never was an Apostolic Age and that Christianity began between A.D. 70 and 135 from Gnosticism, a blend of pagan philosophy and Jewish Messianism. McKerrow denied the historicity of Jesus and maintained that Christ is "mythical" not a historical figure.

McKerrow's Evolution Without Natural Selection promotes a Lamarckian alternative to natural selection. He contended that life must be accepted as a "four-dimensional process" and that living organisms evolve though "habit". This idea was similar to Samuel Butler's.

McKerrow died from cancer in 1965.

== Selected publications ==
- The Appearance of Mind (1923)
- Aberrations of Life (1923)
- Economics for Nicodemus (1927)
- Novius Organum: Essays in a New Metaphysic (1931)
- An Introduction to Pneumatology (1932)
- Religion and History (1934)
- Evolution Without Natural Selection (1937)
