= Laura Joh Rowland =

American detective/mystery writer (born 1953)

- Education: University of Michigan (BS, MPH)
- Occupation: Novelist
- Writing career
- Genre: Mystery fiction
- Notable work: Sano Ichirō series

Laura Joh Rowland (born 1953) is an American detective/mystery author, known for her series of historical mystery novels featuring protagonist Sano Ichirō (佐野 一郎) set in feudal Japan, mostly in Edo during the late 17th century. She is also the author of two other historical mystery series, one featuring a fictionalized Charlotte Brontë, as well an ongoing series set in Victorian England around the time of the Jack the Ripper murders.

== Early life, education, and early career ==
Laura Joh Rowland is the granddaughter of Chinese-American and Korean-American immigrants. She grew up in Harper Woods, Michigan, and was educated at the University of Michigan, where she graduated with a Bachelor of Science degree in microbiology and a Master of Public Health degree.

She tried a number of careers after college, including chemist, microbiologist, quality engineer with Lockheed Martin, and freelance illustrator, but it was not until she took a writing course that she found her calling.

== Writer ==
=== Sano Ichirō ===
Rowland's best known work are the Sano Ichirō mysteries set in feudal Japan. Using as her inspiration P. D. James and Elizabeth George, Rowland set out to write a mystery novel. She had been a big fan of samurai films during her university days, and decided to set her first novel in feudal Japan because "I needed to carve out a territory for myself, and feudal Japan was wide open. It was a marriage of interest and opportunity." Rowland wrote two novels, which were rejected for publication. After finishing her third novel, she sent the manuscript to two publishers and presented a copy to a Random House editor whom she had met at a writer's conference. When all three publishers expressed interest, there was a bidding war that Random House won for $100,000. Shinjū was subsequently published by Random House in 1994. Her feudal Japan series, which eventually reached 16 titles, deals with the experiences of Sano Ichirō, a samurai and minor official who, by the end of the first novel, becomes the trusted chief investigator for the fifth Tokugawa shōgun, Tokugawa Tsunayoshi, and by the tenth novel, is promoted to a very high office.

Throughout the stories, Sano constantly has to deal with the moral conflict of following the code of bushido while serving both justice and his master, the Shogun. After his arranged marriage at the start of the fourth novel to Ueda Reiko (上田 麗子), he also has to deal with her non-traditional attitude as she frequently involves herself in Sano's investigations. In all the novels, Sano experiences great pressure as he is faced with death if he does not fulfill his obligations to the shōgun as well.

Rowland takes some literary license with known figures, creating fictionalized versions of Tokugawa Tsunayoshi, Emperor Higashiyama in The Samurai's Wife, and Yanagisawa Yoshiyasu. Objective historical details, however, are credibly accurate, although New York Times critic F.G. Notehelfer pointed out several historical anachronisms in the first book of the series, Shinjū.

=== Charlotte Brontë ===
In 2008, Rowland started a different mystery series, one that uses Charlotte Brontë as the protagonist. When asked about the difficulty of focusing on such a famous historical figure, she replied, "Writing about famous people can mean challenging readers’ assumptions about them. I think a lot of readers see Charlotte Brontë as a prim church mouse who never left Haworth and never did anything but write."

=== A Victorian Mystery ===
In 2017, Rowland branched out again, this time setting a series of novels in Victorian England during the Jack the Ripper murders. The protagonist of the series is a fictional photographer named Sarah Bain. According to Rowland, Bain has "inside information about the Ripper murders and personal reasons for keeping it secret."

== Reception ==
Laura Picker, writing for Publishers Weekly, noted, "As with all successful historicals, Rowland's Sano novels blend painstaking research with characters whose personalities and inner struggles engage the reader. Sustaining that combination over 16 books is no mean feat, and in doing so, Rowland has earned a place alongside the best current practitioners of the subgenre."

Lane Wright, reviewing the sixth Sano novel, Black Lotus, commented, "There is no one better at the esthetic detail than Laura Joh Rowland. She entices all the senses with her vivid, elegant and deeply observant writing. She realistically brings to life 17th century Japan from the couple who owns the noodle shop, to the jail, to the court of the inept shogun and his elderly, eccentric mother. Rowland creates an air of romance, mystery, danger and history in an exotic setting." Wright concluded, "This novel has it all: plot, genuine human characters, atmospheric setting and the subject of cults relates well to modern times."

Judith Reveal reviewed the third Victorian mystery The Hangman's Secret for New York Journal of Books, and thought it was "initially a slow read, primarily because [Rowland] chose first person present tense as her point of view, and that gives the writing a staccato, clunky feel." Reveal also felt "There are times when one does not care for Rowland’s characters." Despite this, Reveal concluded, "Having said that, and in spite of the rather staccato narrative, the story itself holds water and reads well from beginning to end."

Kirkus Reviews said of her sixth Victorian novel Garden of Sin "Rowland's portrait of Victorian London is so immersive that new readers will be eager to hang in and get all the narrative threads straight. Series fans will delight at the updates to the lives of her charismatic cast."

== Awards ==
Books by Rowland have been nominated for the Anthony Award, the Hammett Prize, and the Barnes & Noble Discover Great New Writers Award, and won RT Magazine's Reader's Choice Award.

== Personal life ==
Rowland lived in New Orleans, Louisiana, until 2005's Hurricane Katrina nearly destroyed her house, but now lives in New York City with her husband, Marty.

== Works ==
=== Sano Ichirō ===
1. Shinjū (ISBN 978-0-06-100950-1, 1994, Random House)
2. Bundori (ISBN 0-7472-1717-3, 1996, HarperTorch)
3. The Way of the Traitor (ISBN 0-06-101090-1,1997, HarperTorch)
4. The Concubine's Tattoo (ISBN 0-312-19252-5, December 1998, St. Martin's Press)
5. The Samurai's Wife (ISBN 0-312-20325-X, May 2000, St. Martin's Press)
6. Black Lotus (ISBN 0-312-26872-6, April 2001, St. Martin's Press)
7. The Pillow Book of Lady Wisteria (ISBN 0-312-28262-1, April 2002, St. Martin's Press)
8. The Dragon King's Palace (ISBN 0-312-28266-4, April 2003, St. Martin's Press)
9. The Perfumed Sleeve (ISBN 0-312-31889-8, April 2004, St. Martin's Minotaur)
10. The Assassin's Touch (ISBN 0-312-31900-2, August 2005, St. Martin's Press)
11. The Red Chrysanthemum (ISBN 0-312-35532-7, November 2006, St. Martin's Press)
12. The Snow Empress (ISBN 0-312-36542-X, October 30, 2007, St. Martin's Minotaur)
13. The Fire Kimono (ISBN 0-312-37948-X, November 11, 2008, St. Martin's Minotaur)
14. The Cloud Pavilion (ISBN 0-312-37949-8, October 27, 2009, Minotaur Books)
15. The Ronin's Mistress (ISBN 0-312-65852-4, September 13, 2011, Minotaur Books)
16. The Incense Game (ISBN 9780312658533, September 18, 2012, Minotaur Books)
17. The Shogun's Daughter (ISBN 9781250028617, September 17, 2013, St. Martin's Press)
18. The Iris Fan (ISBN 9781250047069, December 9, 2014, St. Martin's Press)

==== Annotations ====
- It is not known if it is intentional that the protagonist's name Sano Ichirō could be interpreted as a homage to one of Japan's most famous deductive fiction writers, Murayama Ichirō (丸山 一郎), born in 1928, who uses the pen-name of Sano Yo (佐野洋).
- The title of the first novel is the Romanized form of the term written in kanji as 心中, pronounced as Shinjū, which refers to a suicide pact by a pair of lovers.
- The title of the second novel is the Romanized form of the term written in katakana as ブンドリ (bu-n-do-ri), which means "seizing the soil of the vanquished", or simply spoils of war or war trophy.

=== Charlotte Brontë ===
1. The Secret Adventures of Charlotte Brontë. Overlook Press; 2008. ISBN 978-1590200339
2. Bedlam: The Further Secret Adventures of Charlotte Brontë. Overlook Press; 2010. ISBN 978-1590202715

=== A Victorian Mystery ===
1. The Ripper's Shadow: A Victorian Mystery. Crooked Lane Books; 2017. ISBN 978-1683310051
2. A Mortal Likeness: A Victorian Mystery. Crooked Lane Books; 2018. ISBN 978-1683314479
3. The Hangman's Secret: A Victorian Mystery. Crooked Lane Books; 2019. ISBN 978-1683319023
4. The Woman in the Veil: A Victorian Mystery. Crooked Lane Books; 2020. ISBN 978-1643852416
5. Portrait of Peril: A Victorian Mystery. Crooked Lane Books; 2021. ISBN 978-1643854724
6. Garden of Sins: A Victorian Mystery. Crooked Lane Books; 2022. ISBN 978-1643857954

== See also ==
- List of American novelists
- List of historical novelists
- List of mystery writers
- List of people from Michigan
- List of people from New Orleans
- List of people from New York City
- List of University of Michigan alumni
- List of women writers
