= Caroline Vermalle =

French author (born 1973)

Caroline Vermalle (born 1973) is a French author whose work, written in French and English, ranges from historical novels to thrillers.

== Early life and education ==
Vermalle was born in Picardy, France. She studied cinema at École supérieure d'études cinématographiques in Paris.

== Career ==
Vermalle worked as a BBC documentary producer in London, England. While on maternity leave, she wrote her first novel, L’avant-dernière chance. The book was published in French in 2009 and won the Prix Nouveau Talent in 2009 and Prix Chronos in 2011. It has been translated into German, Spanish, Chinese and English (as George's Grand Tour) and sold over 300,000 copies during its first five years in print.

With the success of this novel, Vermalle became a full-time writer, and has written several more books. She and her husband, South African architect Ryan von Ruben, wrote together a novel in English titled A Flower for the Queen.

In 2016 Vermalle lives in the Vendée department of France with her husband and son.

== Bibliography ==
- L’avant-dernière chance (novel), Calmann-Lévy, 2009; in English, Gallic Books, 2015,
- Nouvelles contemporaines (short stories), Livre de Poche Jeunesse, 2012
- Sixtine (T.1) (thriller), Hachette/Blackmoon, 2013
- La Fille du Déménageur (short stories), Hachette/Blackmoon, 2013
- L’Île des beaux lendemains (novel), Belfond, 2013
- Une collection de trésors minuscules, Belfond, 2014
- Les amis du Paradis, 2015
