= Claudia Dain =

American author of romance novels

- Born: November 1, 1956
- Died: October 3, 2021 (aged 64)
- Occupation: novelist
- Writing career
- Pen name: Claudia Welch
- Period: 2000–2018
- Genre: Romance
- Website: www.claudiadain.com

Claudia Dain was an American author of romance novels. She was a two-time Rita finalist, and a USA Today Bestselling author.

== Biography ==
Claudia Dain attended the University of Southern California as an English major.

== Bibliography ==
=== Regency ===
==== The Courtesan Chronicles ====
- The Courtesan's Daughter
- The Courtesan's Secret
- Wish List (Anthology)
- Private Places (Anthology)
- The Courtesan's Wager
- How to Dazzle a Duke
- Daring a Duke

==== More Courtesan Chronicles ====
- "The Most Dangerous Game"
- "A Chance Encounter" in An Encounter at the Museum (Feb-2013)
- Much Ado About Dutton (Aug-2013)
- Encounters of the Ardenzy Heiresses (Sep-2013)
- Accidentally in Love (Apr-2014)
- "Chasing Miss Montford" in An Encounter at Hyde Park (Aug-2014)

=== Medieval ===
- The Holding
- The Marriage Bed
- The Willing Wife
- The Temptation
- The Fall

=== Western ===
- A Kiss to Die For

=== Colonial America ===
- Tell Me Lies

=== Roman Britain ===
- To Burn
