= László Darvasi =

Hungarian writer (born 1962)

László Darvasi (born 17 October 1962) is a Hungarian poet, playwright and columnist. He also writes under the pseudonym Ernő Szív.

He was the winner of the Attila József Prize in 1998 and the Sándor Márai Prize in 2008.

== Life and work ==
Darvasi was born in Törökszentmiklós. He graduated from the Juhász Gyula Teacher Training College in Szeged in 1986. He worked as a primary school teacher until 1989 before turning to writing and editorial work in the 1990s.

He published his first volume of poetry in 1991, followed by a number of prose works, including A könnymutatványosok legendája ("The Legend of the Tearjerkers", 1999), Virágzabálók ("The Flower Eaters", 2009) and Neandervölgyiek ("Neanderthals", 2024).

== Selected works ==
- Horger Antal Párizsban (1991)
- A portugálok (1992)
- A Borgognoni-féle szomorúság (1994)
- Vizsgálat a rózsák ügyében (1994)
- A könnymutatványosok legendája (1999)
- Szerezni egy nőt (2000)
- A lojangi kutyavadászok (2002)
- Trapiti avagy a nagy tökfőzelékháború (2002)
- Trapiti és a borzasztó nyúl (2004)
- A világ legboldogabb zenekara. Válogatott novellák (2005)
- A titokzatos világválogatott. A labdarúgás története (2006)
- Virágzabálók (2009)
- Pálcika ha elindul, akkor aztán zsupsz (2012)
- Vándorló sírok (2012)
- A zord Apa, avagy a Werner-lány hiteles története (2012)
- A Háromemeletes mesekönyv (2013)
- Isten. Haza. Csal. (2015)
- Taligás (2016)
- Magyar sellő (2019)
- Pálcika, a detektív. A nagy Gerbera-nyomozás (2020)
- Az év légiutas-kísérője (2022)
- Neandervölgyiek I-III (2024)

== See also ==
- List of Hungarian writers
- List of playwrights
- List of poets
