= Bundori =

1996 novel by Laura Joh Rowland

- Cover of paperback edition
- Author: Laura Joh Rowland
- Language: English
- Series: Sano Ichirō
- Genre: Historical mystery
- Publisher: HarperTorch
- Publication date: 1996
- Publication place: United States
- ISBN: 978-0679434238
- Preceded by: Shinjū
- Followed by: The Way of the Traitor

Bundori is the second novel by American writer Laura Joh Rowland, a historical mystery set in 1689 Genroku-era Japan featuring the samurai investigator Sano Ichirō. It was published by HarperTorch in 1996 as a sequel to Rowland's debut novel Shinjū.

== Plot ==
Sano Ichirō, who saved the life of the shogun, Tokugawa Tsunayoshi, in the previous novel, Shinjū, has been appointed to be the shogun's Investigator of Events, Situations and People, allowing the shogun to send Sano to investigate anything that takes the shogun's fancy. When two people in the city are murdered, and their heads affixed to plaques like bundori (war trophies), Sano is sent to apprehend the murderer.

Sano has run afoul of Yanagisawa Yoshiyasu, the shogun's chamberlain and the real power behind the throne, and Yanagisawa vows to prevent Sano from solving the crime. This would be seen as failing to fulfill the shogun's wishes, for which death was the penalty.

Sano consults with Aoi, a palace servant and priestess of a shrine, who uses her powers to communicate with the murder victims. Sano also uses his resources in the Imperial archives, and soon realizes that the murders are the continuation of a century-old blood feud for which there are only four suspects: a rich merchant, the Captain of the Palace Guard, a concubine, and Chamberlain Yanagisawa Yoshiyasu. Arresting the chamberlain would undoubtedly result in Sano's death, and he again is cast into the divide between his duty and his need to find the truth.

Although Sano and Aoi become lovers, Sano eventually deduces that she is feeding him false information, and she reveals she is a ninja who is being forced to work for the chamberlain, who holds the lives of her family in his hand.

Despite this, Aoi cannot resist helping Sano, and discovers information about a witness, allowing Sano to set a trap for the killer. He is able to bring the murderer to custody, but Aoi, knowing her life is now forfeit, slips away in an attempt to reach her family and take them into hiding before the chamberlain can wreak his revenge upon her.

== Publication history ==
After the success of her debut novel Shinjū in 1994, Laura Joh Rowland wrote a sequel, Bundori, which was published by HarperTorch in 1996. Rowland would go on to write 17 more titles in the Sano Ichiro series.

== Reception ==
Kirkus Reviews found this "Not as rich and resourceful as Sano's striking debut — the demands of bushido are asked to carry too much of the interest — but Rowland still masterfully evokes the subtleties and contradictions of 17th-century Japan."

Publishers Weekly noted that "Sano's allegiance to bushido makes him an unexpectedly passive hero, undermining the author's apparent attempt to wed Japanese philosophy to Western mystery-thriller conventions." However, the review concluded on a positive note, saying, "But the novel reads smoothly and positively smokes with historical atmospherics."

Dennis Drabelle, writing for The Washington Post, called the author, "a sure-footed storyteller with a flair for moving mutually inimical characters into charged confrontations." Drabelle called the battle of wits between Sano and Chamberlain Yanagisawa "the best parts of the novel ... Often the shogun is present at these verbal jousts, pulled one way by Sano's potent sincerity, then yanked back the other way by Yanagisawa's crafty rhetoric." Drabelle found Rowland's writing, "gives the reader a solid grounding in the period's architecture, mores and ethics. From the shogun's castle to a whorehouse called Great Joy, she evokes the period without condescending to it." However, Drabelle disliked the ancient blood feud as a plot device, calling it "a bust." Drabelle concluded on a positive note, writing, "Bundori is one of those mysteries in which the itch to find out whodunit recedes before the pleasures of prowling through a different world, soaking up the sights, learning the customs and sympathizing with the dilemmas into which characters of that era are likely to be driven."
