= Adèle Sophia Cordelia Opzoomer =

Dutch writer, poet, and painter (1856–1925)

Adèle Sophia Cordelia Opzoomer (21 July 1856, in Utrecht – 27 December 1925, in Rotterdam), better known by her pseudonym A.S.C. Wallis, was a Dutch writer, poet, and painter, best remembered for her novel In dagen van strijd (1878) about the life of Margaret of Parma. A daughter of Cornelis Willem Opzoomer, she studied still life painting under Margaretha Roosenboom and Johannes Bosboom. She wrote poems and short stories for De Gids, and subsequently became the youngest woman given honorary fellowship of the Maatschappij der Nederlandse Letterkunde in 1880. In 2014, a bust of her likeness was installed in the gardens of the Petőfi Literary Museum.
