= Valerie Anand =

British author of historical fiction (born 1937, died 2023)

- Born: Valerie May Florence Stubington; 6 July 1937
- Died: 13 January 2024 (aged 86)
- Spouse: Dalip Singh Anand (m. 1970)

Valerie May Florence Anand (née Stubington; 6 July 1937 – 13 January 2024) was an English author of historical fiction.

== Early life ==
Anand spent her early childhood in Kent before the Second World War broke out, after which her father joined the RAF while she and her mother went to live with his Aunt Clara in Leatherhead, Surrey. Her father's anecdotes from the war inspired Anand to later learn to fly a plane herself, training at London Biggin Hill.

Initially disinterested in history as a subject, Anand was influenced to write medieval historical fiction after seeing the film Ivanhoe (1952) in cinemas as a teenager.

== Career ==
Anand began her career working as a secretary at Odhams Press before going into trade journalism and then industrial editing. She operated magazines for the furniture store Heal's and the engineering company Matthew Hall.

Under the pen name Fiona Buckley she wrote the series of historical mysteries, set in the reign of Elizabeth I, featuring "Ursula Blanchard" (whose full name is Ursula Faldene Blanchard de la Roche Stannard). Under her own name, she wrote historical fiction based on the royalty of England and the Bridges over Time series which follows a family from the eleventh century through the twentieth century. She has also written To a Native Shore, a contemporary novel that explores British prejudice toward Indian Sikhs.

Anand also held the copyrights to The Fallen Pinnacle, a 1997 novel about Atlantis written under the pseudonym Valerie M. Irwin.

=== Innocence of King Richard III ===
Valerie Anand was a believer in the innocence of King Richard III in the matter of the Princes in the Tower, i.e. a Ricardian. She presented this view in Crown of Roses, making the point that the former tutor of Edward V, John Alcock, remained on good terms with the king, which he presumably would not have done had he suspected him of being responsible for the death of his former student.

== Personal life ==
Anand was a feminist and critical of the 1950s ideals of marriage and domestic life. At age 31, Anand met her future husband Dalip Singh Anand of Northern India. The couple married in 1970.

At the end of her life, Anand lived in Mitcham, South London.

== Bibliography ==
=== Ursula Blanchard mysteries ===
1. To Shield the Queen (1998) ISBN 0-671-01531-1
2. The Doublet Affair (1998) ISBN 0-671-01532-X
3. Queen's Ransom (2000) ISBN 0-671-03293-3
4. To Ruin a Queen (2000) ISBN 0-671-03294-1
5. Queen of Ambition (2002) ISBN 0-7434-1030-0
6. A Pawn for a Queen (2002) ISBN 0-7432-0265-1
7. Fugitive Queen (2004) ISBN 0-7434-5748-X
8. The Siren Queen (2004) ISBN 0-7432-3752-8
9. Queen Without a Crown (2011) ISBN 9781780295145
10. Queen's Bounty (2012) ISBN 9781780295275
11. A Rescue for a Queen (2013)ISBN 9781780295374
12. A Traitor's Tears (2014) ISBN 9781780295435
13. A Perilous Alliance (2015) ISBN 9781780295855
14. The Heretic's Creed (2017) ISBN 9781780295749
15. A Deadly Betrothal (2017) ISBN 9781780295800
16. A Web of Silk (2019) ISBN 9781780295930
17. The Scent of Danger (2020)
18. Forest of Secrets (2021)
19. Shadow of Spain (2021)
20. Golden Cargoes (2022)
21. The Net of Steel (2023)
22. To Seize a Queen (2024)

=== Bridges Over Time series ===
- The Proud Villeins (1992) ISBN 0-312-08282-7
- The Ruthless Yeomen (1991) ISBN 0-312-08884-1
- The Women of Ashdon (1993) ISBN 0-312-09417-5
- The Faithful Lovers (1993) ISBN 0-312-10979-2
- The Cherished Wives (1996) ISBN 0-312-13943-8
- The Dowerless Sisters (1995) ISBN 0-7472-1267-8

=== Norman series ===
- Gildenford (1977) ISBN 0-684-14896-X
- The Norman Pretender (1982) ISBN 0-684-16099-4
- The Disputed Crown (1982) ISBN 0-684-17629-7

=== Other historical novels ===
- King of the Wood (1984) ISBN 0-312-02939-X (2016) ISBN 978-1861514578
  - based on King William Rufus
- Crown of Roses (1989) ISBN 0-312-03315-X
  - based on the end of the Wars of the Roses
- The House of Lanyon - The Exmoor Saga (2007) ISBN 978-0-7783-2502-4
  - Story of Richard Lanyon, his descendants, and his landlords the Sweetwaters
- The House Of Allerbrook - The Exmoor Saga (2008) ISBN 978-1-74116-676-7
  - Story of Jane Sweetwater (Allerbrook)

=== Other novels ===
- To a Native Shore: A Novel of India (1984) ISBN 0-684-18007-3
