= Rebecca Sinclair (author) =

American novelist

- Occupation: Novelist
- Writing career
- Period: 1989–1999
- Genre: romance

Rebecca Sinclair is an American author of twelve historical romance novels.

According to Romantic Times, Sinclair "has a skillful way with characters and some of her supporting cast members were so interesting they deserve books of their own. "

== Works ==
- California Caress (1989)
- Passion's Wild Delight (1990)
- Prairie Angel (1990)
- Wild Scottish Embrace (1991)
- Montana Wildfire (1991)
- Forbidden Desires (1992)
- Scottish Ecstasy (1993)
- Sweet Texas Kiss (1994)
- Forevermore (1995)
- Perfect Strangers (1996)
- Golden Dreams (1997)
- Heart's Whisper (1998)
- Murphy's Law (1999)
- Murphy's Law (reprint) (2009)
