= Yoriki =

Members of the samurai class

Yoriki (与力) were members of the samurai class of feudal Japan. Yoriki literally means helper or assistant.

== Description and history ==
Yoriki assisted daimyō (feudal lords) or their designated commanders during military campaigns in the Kamakura and Muromachi periods.

During the Sengoku period, as the scale of warfare increased, the organization of armies commanded by sengoku daimyō (feudal lords) was subdivided. The daimyō commanded the entire army as the commander-in-chief, sō-daishō (総大将). Under him, the samurai daishō (侍大将) commanded the main cavalry force, while the ashigaru taishō (足軽大将) commanded the ashigaru (足軽) who fought on foot. Yoriki, often from the jizamurai (地侍), assisted the samurai daisho and the ashigaru taishō on horseback.

In the Edo period, yoriki provided administrative assistance at governmental offices. Among different yorikis were the machikata yoriki, who were in charge of police under the command of the machi-bugyō. Below the yoriki were the dōshin. In the city of Edo there were about 25 yorikis working each for the two machi-bugyō offices. Since their status was gokenin (御家人), they were originally equivalent to kachi (徒士) and not allowed to ride horses, but the yoriki were allowed to ride as a special exception.
