= Deb Marlowe =

American novelist

Deb Marlowe is an American author for historical romance novels. She is a 2007 winner of the Romance Writers of America's Golden Heart Award, granted to unpublished authors. Eleven days after entering her second manuscript, The Lost Jewel, for consideration for the Golden Heart Award, Marlowe received word that her first manuscript had been purchased by Mills and Boon. Following the competition, Mills and Boon also purchased The Lost Jewel.

== Bibliography ==
- Scandalous Lord, Rebellious Miss, 2007, Mills and Boon
- The Lost Jewel, 2008, Mills and Boon
