= Karen Kay (author) =

Karen Kay is the pen name for Karen Kay Wilson Elstner, an American author of historical romance novels. All of her novels feature Native Americans.

== Biography ==
Karen Kay, who prefers to be known as Kay, discovered as an adult that she is of Native American descent, as her great-great-grandmother was a member of the Choctaw tribe. After this discovery she began researching the Native American culture to find more about this lost part of her heritage. At the same time, she was working towards her dream of becoming a writer by working on several contemporary romance manuscripts. After seeing the movie Dances With Wolves, however, Kay decided to switch her focus and write romances that featured the Native American culture.

Her first historical romance novel attempt, Lakota Surrender, was purchased in 1994 by Avon Books, who were impressed enough with the work to sign Kay to a three-book contract. The book also received a four-and-a-half star "Exceptional" rating from Romantic Times Magazine.

Before becoming a publishing sensation, Kay worked as a realtor. She has been a Scientologist since 1967. She is also a libertarian. Kay is a supporter of the World Literacy Crusade, an organization linked to the Church of Scientology as well as to Blackfeet Literacy, and the Hollywood Education and Literacy Project.

Kay and her husband, Paul, were married on the Blackfeet reservation in Montana.

== Bibliography ==
=== Blackfoot Warrior ===
- Gray Hawk's Lady (1997)
- White Eagle's Touch (1998)

=== Novels ===
- Lakota Surrender (1994)
- Lakota Princess (1995)
- Proud Wolf's Woman (1996)
- Night Thunder's Bride (1999)
- Wolf Shadow's Promise (2000)
- War Cloud's Passion (2001)
- Lone Arrow's Pride (2002)
- Soaring Eagle's Embrace (2003)
- The Princess and the Wolf (2004)
- The Angel and the Warrior (2005)
- The Spirit of the Wolf (2006)
- Red Hawk's Woman (2007)
- Black Eagle (2009)
