= Shinjū (novel) =

1994 novel by Laura Joh Rowland

- First edition
- Author: Laura Joh Rowland
- Language: English
- Series: Sano Ichirō
- Genre: Historical mystery
- Publisher: Random House
- Publication date: 1994
- Publication place: United States
- ISBN: 978-0-06-100950-1
- Followed by: Bundori

Shinjū is the title of the debut novel by American writer Laura Joh Rowland, a historical mystery set in 1689 Genroku-era Japan. It is the first instalment in her long running Sano Ichirō series.

== Plot ==
Sano Ichirō, a machikata yoriki (police investigator) in the city of Edo, is ordered by his superior, Magistrate Ogyu, to report that two bodies discovered in Edo Bay were a case of shinjū (ritual double-suicide by lovers). But after an illegal autopsy reveals that the dead man, Noriyoshi, was murdered, Sano quietly investigates despite his orders. The dead woman, Yukiko, belonged to the powerful Niu noble family, and Sano has to be careful not to offend as he questions Yukiko's brother Masahito and her mother, Lady Niu. Sano feels one of Yukiko's sisters, Midori, has more information, but he is shown to the door before he can question her.

Sano tries to find out more about Noriyoshi, and after questioning the dead man's employer, as well as a sumo wrestler, a courtesan and a onnagata (female impersonator), he discovers that the dead man was a homosexual artist with a talent for blackmail. Sano is now convinced that Noriyoshi and Yukiko were not lovers who committed suicide but were both murdered.

When Magistrate Ogyu discovers that Sano is investigating, he orders Sano to stop. Nonetheless, when Sano discovers that Yukiko's sister Midori has been banished to a distant nunnery, Sano asks Magistrate Ogyu for some leave so he can visit a shrine — which happens to be very close to the nunnery — to pray for his father, who is ill. During the trip there, Sano's assistant is murdered by a night-time assailant, and Sano narrowly escapes harm.

At the nunnery, Midori reveals that Yukiko was very upset by actions of a member of the Niu family that threatens to destroy the family's reputation. Returning to Edo, Sano spies on Yukiko's brother and discovers he and a cabal of friends are planning to assassinate the shogun that night during New Year's celebrations, when the shogun will be walking incognito in Edo's streets. At this point, Sano believes it was Masahito who killed both Noriyoshi and Yukiko and made it look like a case of shinju. But before he can escape from the Niu estate and save the shogun, Sano is captured by Lady Niu's personal bodyguard and dragged before Lady Niu. Sano then realizes Lady Niu had ordered her bodyguard to kill Noriyoshi and Yukiko after both of them confronted her about Masahito's plot — Noriyoshi to blackmail her, and Yukiko because of the stain to the family's honor. Lady Niu still refuses to believe Masahito could be involved in an assassination plot until Sano shows her a document signed by Masahito and his cronies in which they vow to kill the shogun. Lady Niu releases Sano, who rushes off to try to prevent the assassination. Lady Niu then commits seppuku (ritual suicide).

Sano arrives at the scene of the assassination just in time and engages in personal combat with Masahito, eventually killing him. Impressed by Sano's dedication to discovering the truth, the shogun promotes Sano to be his personal investigator.

== Publication history ==
Laura Joh Rowland had been a big fan of samurai films during her university days, and decided to set her first novel in feudal Japan because "I needed to carve out a territory for myself, and feudal Japan was wide open. It was a marriage of interest and opportunity." Rowland wrote two novels, which were rejected for publication. After finishing her third novel, she sent the manuscript to two publishers and presented a copy to a Random House editor whom she had met at a writer's conference. When all three publishers expressed interest, there was a bidding war that Random House won for $100,000. Shinjū was subsequently published by Random House in 1994.

Rowland has written 17 more titles in the Sano Ichiro series.

== Reception ==
Writing for Quill & Quire, Michael McGowan commented, "From describing the rigidity of the class system to the clothes worn by samurai warriors, Rowland evokes the richness of Japanese life 300 years ago. We are given an enlightening (but never pedantic) primer of Edo society." McGowan concluded, "Though Rowland is not averse to writing melodramatic prose ... or forgoing subtlety for some in-your-face earnestness ... Sano's quest and the adversity he must overcome to succeed make for an entertaining read."

In the New York Times, F.G. Notehelfer found the book interesting, writing, "Part of the power of Shinju derives from its genuine suspense, from wondering who will win the final struggle — the stubborn detective or the powers that be (that is, Japanese society), who possess remarkable resources to enforce conformity. Driven to the verge of shinju (which originally meant a sincere sacrifice, not just amatory suicide), Sano eventually triumphs — too easily for this reviewer and perhaps for others familiar with Japan." Although Notehelfer found several historical anachronisms, the review concluded, "An interesting and even exciting tale, Ms. Rowland's novel introduces us to a new detective who, I suspect, will appear in further adventures."

Publishers Weekly noted, "Replete with convincing details, the setting's time and place provide lively and diverting passages; the plot, however, twists only occasionally before its fairly predictable, politically rooted resolution. Rowland crafts a competent mystery her first time out, shows sure command of her background material and demonstrates that she is a writer of depth and potential."

The novel was shortlisted for the 1994 Hammett Prize.
