= Genroku =

Period of Japanese history (1688–1704)

Genroku (元禄) was a Japanese era name (年号, nengō; "year name") after Jōkyō and before Hōei. The Genroku period spanned the years from September 1688 to March 1704. The reigning emperor was Emperor Higashiyama (東山天皇).

The period was known for its peace and prosperity, as the previous hundred years of peace and seclusion in Japan had created relative economic stability. The arts and architecture flourished. There were unanticipated consequences when the shogunate debased the quality of coins as a strategy for financing the appearance of continuing Genroku affluence. This strategic miscalculation caused abrupt inflation. Then, in an effort to solve the ensuing crisis, the bakufu introduced what were called the Kyōhō Reforms.

== Change of era ==
The first year of the Genroku period (元禄元年, Genroku gannen) was 1688. The new era name was created to mark the beginning of the reign of Higashiyama. The previous era ended and the new one commenced in Jōkyō 5, on the 30th day of the 9th month.

A sense of optimism is suggested in the era name choice of Genroku (meaning "original happiness").

== Events of the Genroku era ==
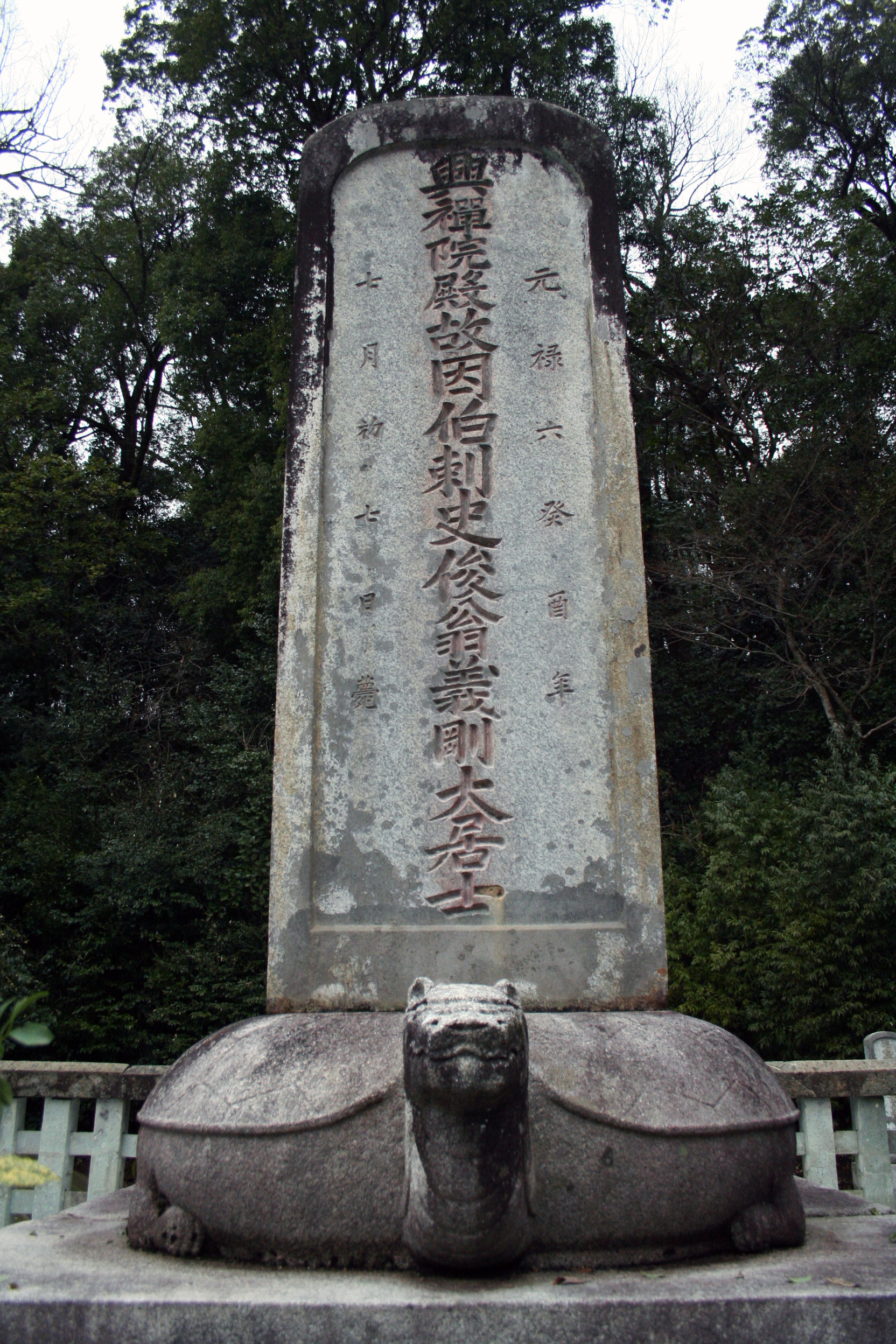
A turtle-based stele of Ikeda Mitsunaka, a Tottori Domain ruler, dated Genroku 6

- 1688 (Genroku 1, 1st month): Ihara Saikaku publishes Japan's Eternal Treasury.
- 1688 (Genroku 1, 11th month): Yanagisawa Yoshiyasu assumes the office of Soba Yōnin.
- 1688 (Genroku 1): The Tokugawa shogunate revised the code of conduct for funerals (Fuku-kiju-ryō), which incorporated a code of conduct for mourning as well.
- 1689 (Genroku 2, 4th month): Foreign settlements in Nagasaki become possible.
- September 16, 1689 (Genroku 2, 3rd day of the 7th month): German physician Engelbert Kaempfer arrives at Dejima.
- 1690 (Genroku 3, 10th month): The Abandoned Child Ban was officially proclaimed.
- 1692 (Genroku 5): Building of temples in Edo banned.
- 1693 (Genroku 6, 12th month): Arai Hakuseki becomes tutor to the daimyō of Kōfu-han, the future shōgun Tokugawa Ienobu.
- 1693 (Genroku 6): The code of conduct for funerals is revised again.
- 1695 (Genroku 8, 2nd month): Land survey performed of territory under the direct control of the bakufu in Kantō.
- 1695 (Genroku 8, 8th month): Minting begun of Genroku coinage. The shogunate placed the Japanese character gen (元) on the obverse of copper coins, the same character used today in China for the yuan. There is no connection between those uses, however.
- 1695 (Genroku 8, 11th month): First kennel is established for stray dogs in Edo. In this context, Tokugawa Tsunayoshi comes to be nicknamed "the Dog shōgun".

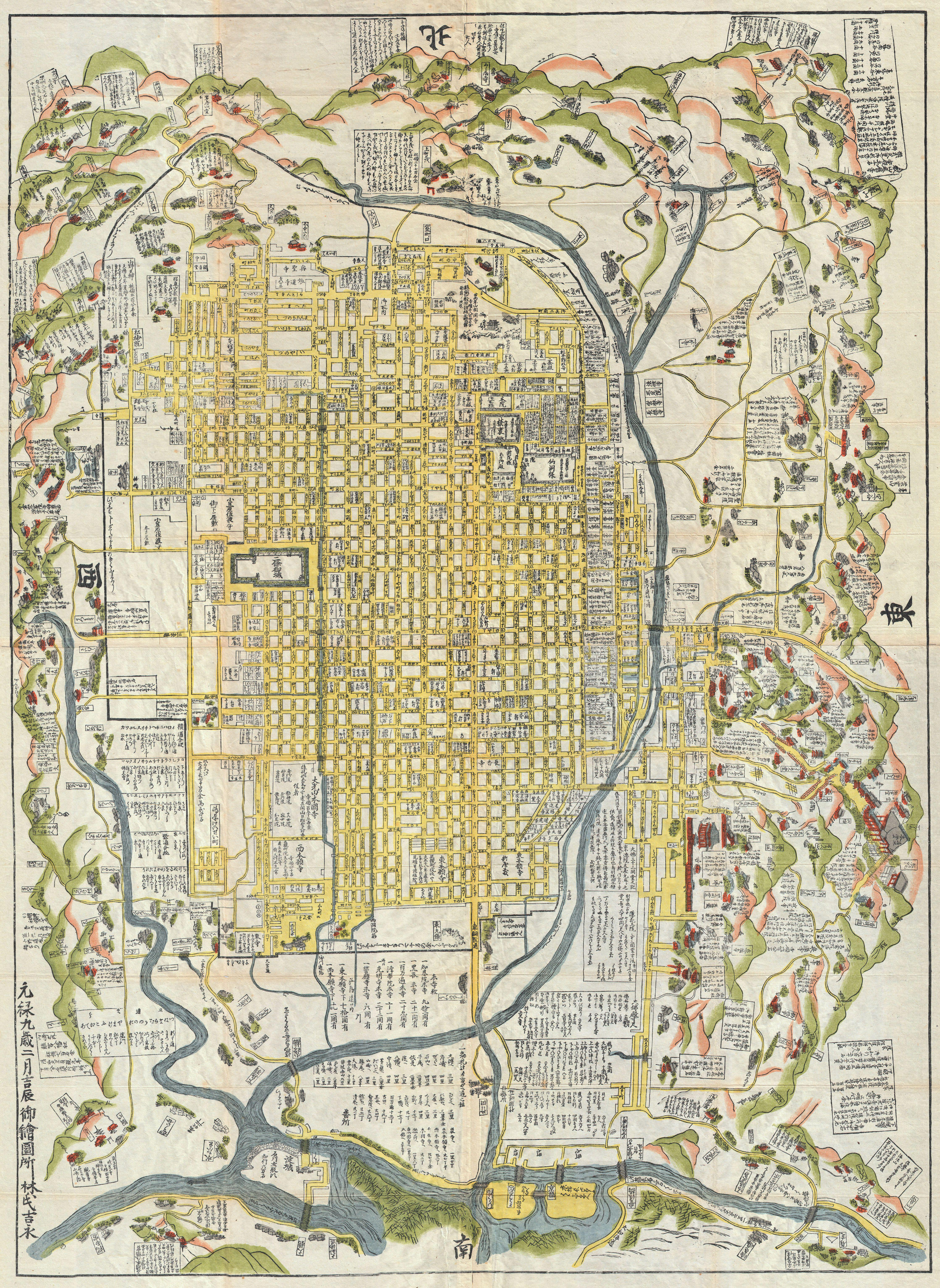
Map of Kyoto and immediate vicinity, c. 1696. Like most early Japanese maps, this map does not have a firm directional orientation, rather all text radiates out from the center.

- 1697 (Genroku 10): The fourth official map of Japan (Genroku kuniezu) was made in this year, but it was considered to be inferior to the previous one—which had been ordered in Shōhō 1 (1605) and completed in Kan'ei 16 (1639). This map was corrected in Kyōhō 4 (1719) by the mathematician Tatebe Katahiro (1644–1739), using high mountain peaks as points of reference, and was drawn to a scale of 1:21,600.
- 1697 (Genroku 10): Great fire in Edo.
- 1698 (Genroku 11): Another great fire in Edo. A new hall is constructed inside the enclosure of the Edo temple of Kan'ei-ji (which is also known as Tōeizan Kan'ei-ji or "Hiei-san of the east" after the temple of Enryaku-ji at Mount Hiei near to Heian-kyō).
- 1700 (Genroku 13, 11th month): Exchange rate of silver coins established.
- 1703 (Genroku 15, 12th month): Akō Domain incident involving the 47 rōnin.
- 1703 (Genroku 16, 3rd month): Ōishi Yoshio commits ritual suicide.
- 1703 (Genroku 16, 5th month): First performance of Chikamatsu Monzaemon's play The Love Suicides at Sonezaki.
- December 31, 1703 (Genroku 16, 23rd day of the 11th month): The Great Genroku earthquake shook Edo and parts of the shogun's castle collapsed. The following day, a vast fire spread throughout the city. Parts of Honshū's coast were battered by tsunami, and up to 200,000 people were either killed or injured.

== Prominent figures of the Genroku era ==
- Chikamatsu Monzaemon—jōruri playwright
- Ichikawa Danjūrō I, Sakata Tōjūrō I, Yoshizawa Ayame I—kabuki actors
- Ihara Saikaku—novelist
- Arai Hakuseki—Confucian scholar and shogunal advisor
- The Forty-seven rōnin
- Ogata Kōrin and Ogata Kenzan—Rinpa school artists
- Torii Kiyonobu, Hishikawa Moronobu, Miyagawa Chōshun—ukiyo-e artists
- Matsuo Bashō—Haiku poet

== See also ==
- Genroku culture

== Notes ==
Preceded by Jōkyō (貞享)	Era or nengō Genroku (元禄); 1688–1704	Succeeded by Hōei (宝永)
