= Guillaume de Villaret =

24th Grand Master of the Knights Hospitallers from 1296 to 1305

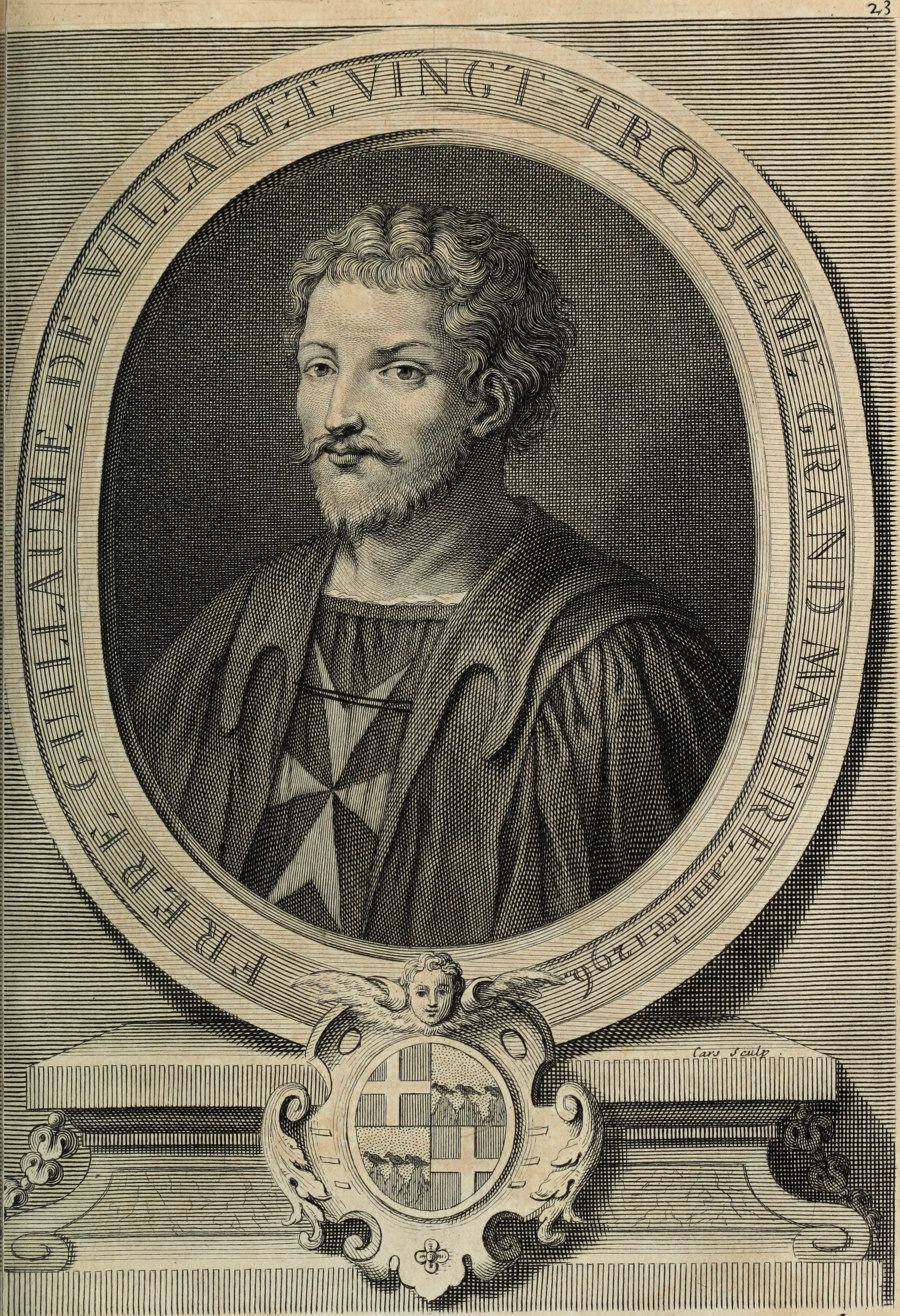
- Guillaume de Villaret on a copper engraving by Laurent Cars, 1725.

24th Grand Master of the Knights Hospitaller
- In office 1296–1305
- Preceded by: Odon de Pins
- Succeeded by: Foulques de Villaret

Personal details
- Born: c. 1235 Kingdom of France
- Died: 9 June 1305 Kingdom of Cyprus

Military service
- Allegiance: (Sovereign Military Order of Malta) Knights Hospitaller
- Years of service: 1266–1305

Guillaume de Villaret (c. 1235 – 1305), was the twenty-fourth Grand Master of the Knights Hospitaller, a position he held from 1296 until 1305, succeeding Odon de Pins. He was succeeded by his nephew, Foulques de Villaret, whose career he had done much to advance.

== Biography ==
Guillaume de Villaret was a native of Languedoc-Roussillon. Before his position as Master, Villaret had been Grand Prior of Saint-Gilles. He spent the first few years of his mastership in a reforming tour of the Order's priories (in France proper, the Auvergne and Provence). Guillaume had a nephew, once believed to be his brother, and an uncle in the Order of St. John of Jerusalem who bore the same name. The nephew, Foulques de Villaret, was Admiral of the Order in 1299, then Grand Preceptor in 1302, then Guillaume's lieutenant in 1303 before becoming Grand Master himself in 1305. The uncle Foulques de Villaret, was chaplain of the Hospitaller Commandery of Millau from 1239 to 1260.

Received as a knight in the Order of St. John of Jerusalem, Guillaume de Villaret's first responsibilities in the Order were those of Grand Conservateur, or Draper, from October 1266. The position of Draper corresponded to that of a steward. In 1269, he was appointed Lieutenant of the Priory of Saint-Gilles. In 1270, he became the prior. This position, which he held until 1296, was one of the most useful for the Order thanks to the relations he maintained with the Pope and several sovereigns.

On 19 February 1274, Philip III the Bold of France ceded the Comtat Venaissin to pope Gregory X. The latter, having known de Villaret in the Holy Land and having been able to judge his capacities as an administrator in Saint-Gilles, appointed him rector of the Comtat on 27 April 1274. Guillaume had his men-at-arms control all the places in Venaissin, installing two knights in each castrum. As rector he resided in Pernes-les-Fontaines or in Beaumes-de-Venise. Pierre Rostaing, bishop of Carpentras, was the first to pay homage to the pope's representative in the Comitat. In 1275, the rector summoned the three bishops of the Comtat and the nobles of Venaissin to an assembly to adopt new statutes. The end of his mandate as rector was between 29 March 1284 and 9 October 1287. In 1277, he became advisor to the king of Sicily, Charles I of Anjou. He remained advisor to his son and heir Charles II of Anjou. The new king of Naples entrusted several negotiation missions to Guillaume. As a result, benefits accrued to his entourage, with his nephew, Guigue being named valet of Charles II.

== Election as Grand Master ==
Grand Master Odon de Pins died on 26 March 1296. The General Chapter of the Order met a few days later in Limassol. The concern of the General Chapter was the reorganization of the prerogatives of the Chapter and of the Grand Masters who had too much of a tendency not to respect the Chapter ordinances and to decide alone without the advice of the Chapter. Counting on the administrative qualities of Guillaume de Villaret, the chapter elected the prior of Saint-Gilles as the new Grand Master. The latter received in Provence a letter dated 3 April 1296 informing him of his election, but Guillaume did not hasten his departure. In fact, since the loss of the Holy Land, there was also talk of establishing the Order in the West. Guillaume thought that he would be more useful to the Order in France, Italy or even the Iberian Peninsula than in Cyprus, where the understanding was not always good with the island's leaders. It was during his presence outside Cyprus that he created the priory of Fieux in Quercy, the first prioress being Jourdaine de Villaret, his sister.

The longer de Villaret's arrival was delayed, the more discontent grew in Cyprus. When he convened a chapter in Marseilles in 1297, he was reproached for not going overseas and his status as Grand Master was contested, and he promised to convene a general chapter in August 1299 at the latest. When Jean de Toulouse, delegate of the Grand Master, brought to Limassol in the spring of 1299 Guillaume's letter convening a general chapter in Avignon on 1 August 1300, discontent was at its height. The chapter then sent an embassy, composed of Guillaume de Chaus and Jean de Laodicée, to convince de Villaret to go to Cyprus. In the end, the legal arguments presented by the ambassadors overcame the obstinacy of the Grand Master who finally went to Limassol. This new chapter met on 5 November 1300 in Limassol. It was during this chapter that Guillaume de Villaret was finally officially enthroned as Grand Master of the Order.

== Reorganization of the Order ==
One of the first tasks to which de Villaret devoted himself was to reduce the power acquired by the General Chapter. However, he quickly agreed to give back the full extent of their powers to the members. He also sought to return to the founding principles of the Order and the life of the knights. Towards this end, he produced ordinances aimed at re-establishing a rigorous dress code and, above all, at ensuring that the framework of conventual life was respected more precisely.

In 1301, it was under his magistracy that an administrative division of the Order's possessions in the West was established, according to a chapter decree. This reorganization of the Order was inspired by a proposal made with Boniface de Calamandrana, Grand Commander of the Overseas Territories when he was Prior of Saint-Gilles. This division was based on the notion of the Hospitaller Langue, because it respected linguistic zones that are more or less homogeneous. Thus seven Langues were formed, with their respective priories as follows.

- Aragon (actually referring to the Iberian Peninsula): Amposta, Barcelona, Cizur (Navarre), Consuegra (Castile), and Crato (Portugal)
- Auvergne (south-central France): Bourganeuf
- England (Great Britain and Ireland): Clerkenwell (near London) and Kilmainham (near Dublin)
- France (French lands north of the Loire): Corbeil (near Paris), Angers, and Voulaines
- Germany (most of Central and Northern Europe): Heitersheim, Prague, Antvorskov (now in Denmark), Vrana (now in Croatia), and Sonnenburg (now in Poland)
- Italy: Asti, Venice, Pisa, Rome, Capua, Barletta, and Messina
- Provence (southern France): Toulouse and Saint-Gilles

Villaret was successful in obtaining large additions of property and privileges from the Papacy and from various European princes. He also undertook a major reorganization of the Order and promulgated a series of statutes between 1300 and 1304, the most significant of which was the definition of the powers and status of the admiral, a new great dignitary who had first been appointed in 1299.

== Combat in the Holy Land ==
After the loss of Acre, the balance of power in the Holy Land between Christians and Mamluks was clearly in favor of the latter, who continued to advance. However, the Christians could count on the Mongols of Persia led by Mahmud Ghazan Khan, whose expansionism pushed them to covet the Mamluk lands. The khan sent an ambassador to Nicosia, capital of the kingdom of Cyprus, to establish an alliance. Henry II of Cyprus, David VIII of Georgia and Templar Grand Master Jacques de Molay decided to have him escorted to the pope to support the idea of an alliance. The alliance between Mahmud Ghazan Khan, the Knights Templar of Jacques de Molay, the Hospitallers of Guillaume de Villaret and the kingdom of Cyprus became effective in 1300.

While waiting for the results of this diplomatic initiative, Henry II, Guillaume de Villaret and Jacques de Molay raised a fleet for a raid on Egypt. The Christians, aboard sixteen galleys and a dozen small ships, were accompanied by a Mongolian emissary. In July 1300, they pillaged Rosetta and Alexandria before returning to Cyprus. The booty was considerable and the Christians sent a strong sign to Mahmud Ghazan, demonstrating their determination to engage in the planned battle. The Mongol leader then sent them a message to warn them that he intended to launch his campaign soon and invited them to disembark in Armenia to organize a joint offensive.

The king of Cyprus sent an army to Armenia accompanied by 300 knights of the two orders led by the grand masters in person. They stormed the island of Ruad, near the Syrian coast, with the aim of turning it into a base for their future operations. They then took the port city of Tortosa, pillaged the region, captured many Muslims and sold them as slaves in Armenia while waiting for the arrival of the Mongols, but this only led to the Fall of Ruad, the last battle for the Holy Land.

== Hospitaller Rhodes ==
When the Hospitallers retreated to Cyprus, the island was already occupied by the titular king of Jerusalem, Henry II of Cyprus. He was only moderately pleased that an organization as powerful as the Order could compete with him for the sovereignty of such a small island. According to traditional historians of the Order, it was Henry who set Guillaume on the path to conquer the island of Rhodes. This objective was achieved under Guillaume's successor, resulting in what is known as Hospitaller Rhodes which would last from 1310 until 1522.

== Death and succession ==
Guillaume de Villaret died between 23 November 1304 and 3 November 1305, probably in the spring of 1305 or on 9 June 1305 in Cyprus, which he had been so slow to reach. When the chapter met to decide on his successor, the choice fell on Foulques de Villaret. Although some sources refer to him as Guillaume's brother, it seems that he was his nephew.

== See also ==
- Cartulaire général de l'Ordre des Hospitaliers
- List of Knights Hospitaller sites
- Langue (Knights Hospitaller)
- Flags of the Knights Hospitaller

== Bibliography ==
- Delaville Le Roulx, Joseph (1904). Les Hospitaliers en Terre Sainte et à Chypre (1100-1310). E. Leroux, Paris.
- Demurger, Alain (2009). The Last Templar: The Tragedy of Jacques de Molay, Last Grand Master of the Temple. Profile Books. ISBN 9781846682247.
- Demurger, Alain (2013). Les Hospitaliers, De Jérusalem à Rhodes 1050-1317. Tallandier, Paris. ISBN 979-1021000605.
- Flavigny, Bertrand Galimard (2006). Histoire de l'ordre de Malte. Perrin, Paris. ISBN 978-2262021153.
- Harot, Eugène (1911). Essai d'armorial des grands maîtres de l'Ordre de Saint-Jean de Jérusalem. Collegio araldico.
- Jackson, Peter (2005). The Mongols and the West, 1221-1410. Pearson Longman. ISBN 9780582368965.
- Josserand, Philippe (2009). Prier et combattre, Dictionnaire européen des ordres militaires au Moyen Âge. Fayard, Paris. ISBN 978-2213627205.
- Lock, Peter (2006). The Routledge Companion to the Crusades. Routledge. doi:10.4324/9780203389638. ISBN 0-415-39312-4.
- Luke, Harry (1969). The Kingdom of Cyprus, 1291–1369 (PDF). A History of the Crusades (Setton), Volume III.
- Murray, Alan V. (2006). The Crusades—An Encyclopedia. ABC-CLIO. ISBN 978-1-57607-862-4.
- Nicholson, Helen J. (2001). The Knights Hospitaller. Boydell & Brewer. ISBN 978-1843830382.
- Runciman, Steven (1954). A History of the Crusades, Volume Three: The Kingdom of Acre and the Later Crusades. Cambridge University Press. ISBN 9780521347723.
- Setton, Kenneth M. (1969). A History of the Crusades. University of Wisconsin Press.
- Vann, Theresa M. (2006). Order of the Hospital. The Crusades––An Encyclopedia, pp. 598–605.
- Zaida, Mustafa (1969). The Mamluk Sultans, 1291–1517 (PDF). A History of the Crusades (Setton), Volume III.

| Preceded by Odon de Pins | Grand Master of the Knights Hospitaller; 1296–1305 | Succeeded by Foulques de Villaret |
