= Jean de Villiers (grand master) =

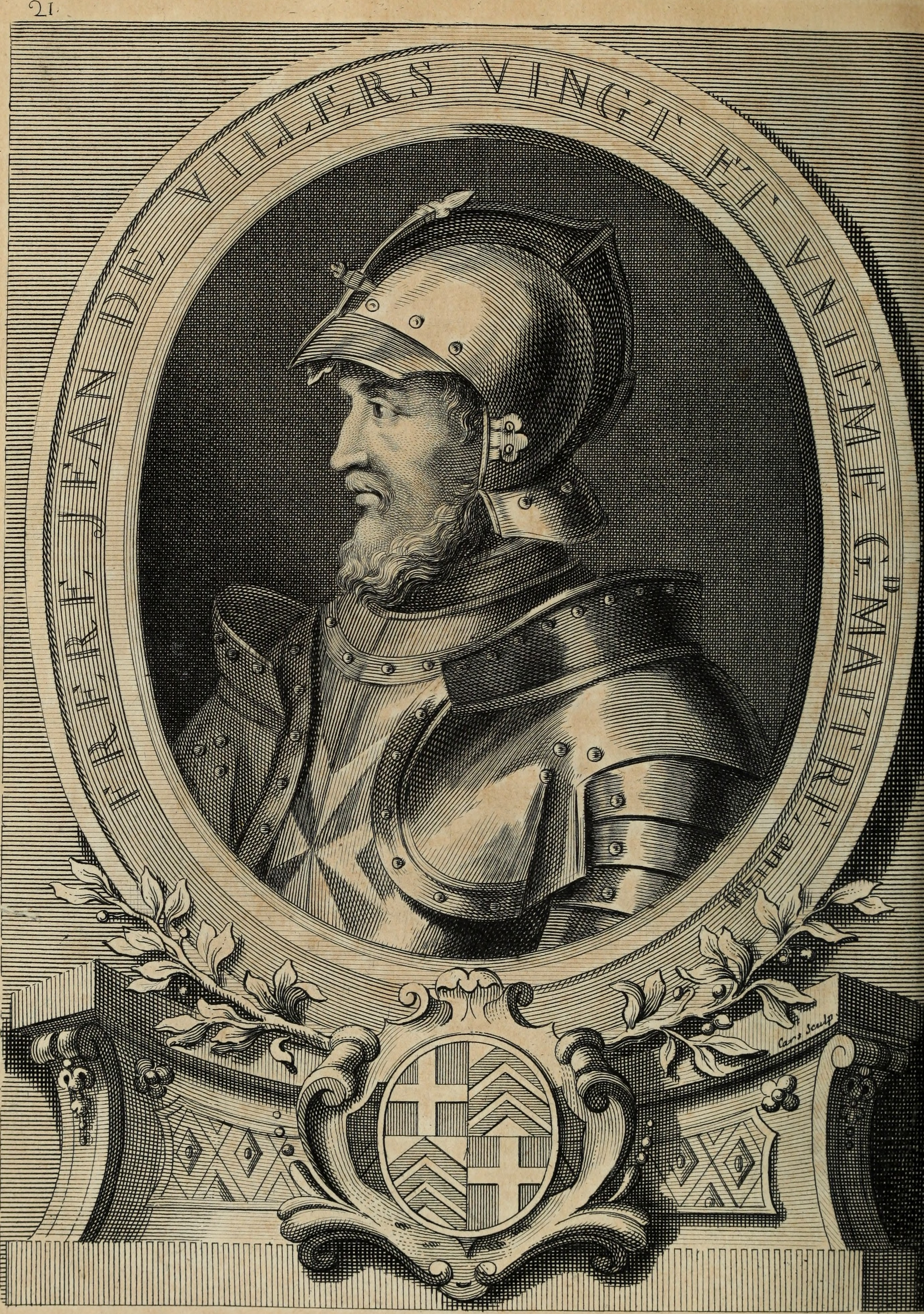
Jean de Villiers on a copper engraving by Laurent Cars, c. 1725

Jean de Villiers was the twenty-second grand master of the Knights Hospitaller, serving from 1285 until 1293. He was elected Grand Master after the death of Nicolas Lorgne. De Villiers was Prior of France beginning in 1282 and he remained in France to deal with existing problems of the Order. Jacques de Taxi became Grand Master ad interim, perhaps through 27 June 1286, while awaiting the arrival of the newly elected Grand Master in the Holy Land. De Villiers was present at the Siege of Acre in 1291, but escaped just before the city fell to the Mamluks. He was succeeded by Odon de Pins.

== Biography ==
Jean de Villiers appeared for the first time on 6 July 1269 when he went to the Holy Land at the request of Grand Master Hugues de Revel. He was made Commander of Tripoli on 4 April 1277, and then Prior of France in 1282. He was elected Grand Master in the summer of 1285. He remained in France to deal with the many problems of the Order. On 21 August 1286 he was in Puymoisson in Provence to try to mobilize help for the Christian cause, but these efforts were mostly futile. He sold some of his possessions to the Order of Malta, some to the Marmoutier Abbey, and stayed in France to obtain financing. He was successful in this endeavor he went to the Holy Land with important subsidies.

It was Jacques de Taxi, who was Grand Commander at Acre, who then became Lieutenant of the Order ad interim, perhaps on 27 June 1286, while awaiting the arrival of the Grand Master.

== Grand Master of the Order ==
De Villiers arrived in the East in the fall of 1286. On 28 October 1288, he presided over a general chapter in Acre.

On 17 March 1289, the Christians had to face the siege of Tripoli. All the Christian forces were mobilized, the Constable Amaury de Lusignan, the contingent of the King of France under the orders of Jean de Grailly, the Templars under the orders of Geoffrey de Vendac, the Hospitallers under the orders of Marshal Matthieu de Clermont and Venetian and Genoese galleys or Pisan ships. The destruction of the old tower of the Bishop and the new tower of the Hospitallers sealed the fall of the city on 26 April 1289. Amaury de Lusignan, Jean de Grailly, Geoffrey de Vendac and Matthieu de Clermont managed to escape by sea. The chronicles of the time are discreet about the role of de Villiers. The strongholds of Nephin, owned by the Hospitallers, and Batroun fell into the hands of the Mamluks. Only in the Holy Land remained Acre, Haïfa, Sidon, Tyre and Beirut. The death of al-Mansur Qalawun left a respite for the Christians, but his son al-Ashraf Khalil had sworn to his father to take Acre.

== The loss of Acre ==
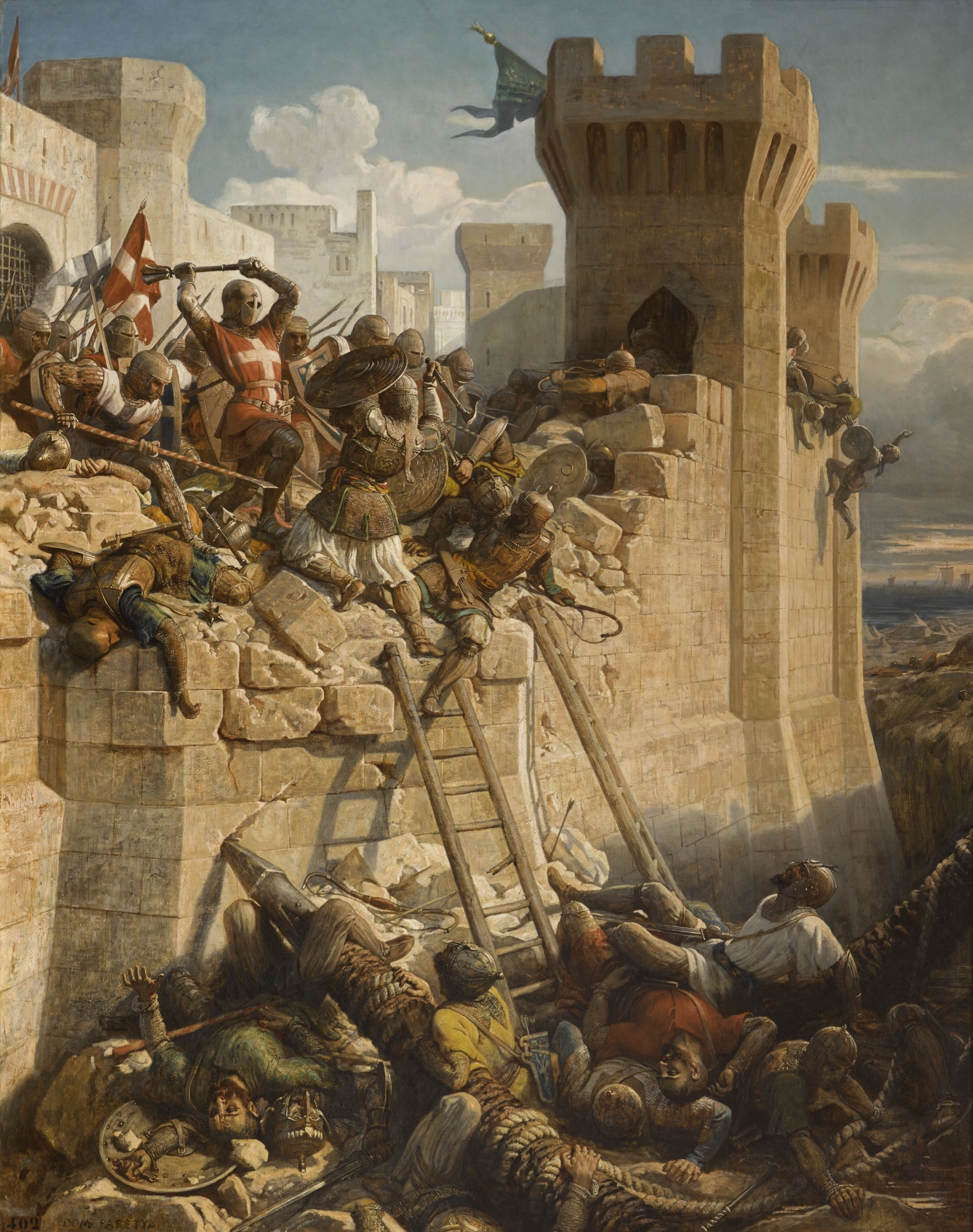
Matthieu de Clermont défend Ptolémaïs en 1291, by Dominique Papety (1815–49) at Versailles

The forces facing the Mamluks at the Siege of Acre in 1291 were divided into four components. The first under the orders of Jean de Grailly and Otto de Grandson. The second under the orders of Henry II of Cyprus and Konrad von Feuchtwangen, the lieutenant of the Teutonic Knights. The third was under the orders of de Villiers and the grand master of the Order of St. Thomas of Acre. Finally, the fourth was under the orders of the grand masters of the Templars and St. Lazarus, Guillaume de Beaujeu and Thomas de Sainville. The troops of al-Ashraf Khalil regrouped under the walls of Acre on 5 April 1291 and went on the attack on 12 April. The besieged tried several sorties without success, even the arrival of reinforcements sent by the king of Cyprus on 4 May, were without effect. During the assault of 16 May, a breach was opened near the Saint-Antoine gate, but the Templars and the Hospitallers, led by Matthew of Clermont, succeeded in repelling the Mamluks. During this respite, women and children embarked, but the boats could not sail due to the state of the sea. On May 18, the enemy resumed its assaults, at the Porte Saint-Antoine, Matthew of Clermont succeeded in repelling them but he was caught in the back by other troops who had crossed the wall. The Grand Masters of the Temple and the Hospital, with Syrian and Cypriot knights, tried to stop them. The Grand Master Guillaume de Beaujeu was wounded under the armpit and died shortly afterwards. Jean de Villiers was also wounded but saved by the valets d'armes and was taken away from the enemy on a boat with seven Hospitaller knights, the only survivors. Matthew of Clermont died near the Rue des Génois. The Pisans at the Porte Saint-Romain, the knights of Saint-Thomas near the church of Saint-Léonard, Jean de Grailly and Othon de Grandson at the Porte Saint-Nicolas and at the Legate Tower gave up. The Mamluks were masters of the city, the women and children were reduced to slavery, and all the men were put to the sword. His rescue must have caused a stir in the Order, and the letter of justification that he addressed to Guillaume de Villaret, prior of Saint-Gilles and future grand master, was not unrelated to this.

== In Cyprus ==
Taking refuge in Limassol at the castle of Kolossi, Jean de Villiers was occupied by the holding of a general chapter on 6 October 1292. He wanted to put the Hospitallers in a position to reconquer the Holy Land. He still enjoyed a persistent popularity by reforming the mode of election of the Grand Master. Postulants were still numerous and recruitments were subject to the approval of the Grand Master except in the land of Reconquista. He prepared for the defense of the kingdom of Cyprus and the protection of the kingdom of Armenia, both of which were threatened by the Mamluks. Entangled in Cypriot politics, de Villaret formed a plan to acquire a new temporal domain, the island of Rhodes, then part of the Byzantine Empire.

The death of Jean de Villiers occurred in the weeks following the organization of a second General Chapter on 30 October 1293. He was succeeded by Odon de Pins.

== See also ==
- Cartulaire général de l'Ordre des Hospitaliers
- List of Knights Hospitaller sites
- Langue (Knights Hospitaller)
- Flags of the Knights Hospitaller

== Bibliography ==
- Bronstein, Judith (2005). The Hospitallers and the Holy Land: Financing the Latin East, 1187-1274. Boydell Press. ISBN 9781843831310.
- Claverie, Pierre-Vincent (2020). Frankish Epigraphy. The French of Outremer, Fordham University.
- Delaville Le Roulx, Joseph (1904). Les Hospitaliers en Terre Sainte et à Chypre (1100-1310). E. Leroux, Paris.
- Demurger, Alain (2013). Les Hospitaliers, De Jérusalem à Rhodes 1050-1317. Tallandier, Paris. ISBN 979-1021000605.
- Flavigny, Bertrand Galimard (2006). Histoire de l'ordre de Malte. Perrin, Paris. ISBN 978-2262021153.
- Harot, Eugène (1911). Essai d'armorial des grands maîtres de l'Ordre de Saint-Jean de Jérusalem. Collegio araldico.
- Hitti, Philip Khuri (1937). History of the Arabs. Macmillan, New York.
- Josserand, Philippe (2009). Prier et combattre, Dictionnaire européen des ordres militaires au Moyen Âge. Fayard, Paris. ISBN 978-2213627205.
- Lock, Peter (2006). The Routledge Companion to the Crusades. Routledge. doi:10.4324/9780203389638. ISBN 0-415-39312-4.
- Murray, Alan V. (2006). The Crusades—An Encyclopedia. ABC-CLIO. ISBN 978-1-57607-862-4. Archived from the original on 2023-03-26.
- Nicholson, Helen J. (2001). The Knights Hospitaller. Boydell & Brewer. ISBN 978-1843830382.
- Riley-Smith, Jonathan (1973). The Feudal Nobility and the Kingdom of Jerusalem, 1174-1277. Macmillan. ISBN 978-0333063798.
- Runciman, Steven (1954). A History of the Crusades, Volume Three: The Kingdom of Acre and the Later Crusades. Cambridge University Press. ISBN 9780521347723.
- Setton, Kenneth M. (1969). A History of the Crusades. University of Wisconsin Press.
- Tyerman, Christopher (2006). God's War: A New History of the Crusades. Belknap Press. ISBN 978-0-674-02387-1.
- Vann, Theresa M. (2006). Order of the Hospital. The Crusades––An Encyclopedia, pp. 598–605.
- Ziyādaẗ, Muḥammad Muṣṭafā (1969). The Mamluk Sultans to 1293 (PDF). A History of the Crusades (Setton), Volume II. Archived from the original (PDF) on June 14, 2020.

Preceded by Jacques de Taxi	Grand Master of the Knights Hospitaller; 1285–1293	Succeeded by Odon de Pins
