= Jacques de Taxi =

Jacques de Taxi (fl. 1269–1285) was ad interim Grand Master of the Knights Hospitaller, serving in 1285 and was the successor to Nicolas Lorgne. De Taxi was appointed as acting leader of the Order prior to the arrival of Jean de Villiers in the Holy Land.

== Biography ==
Jacques de Taxi was born in Cornello dei Tasso, in the municipality of Camerata Cornello, in the Bremba Valley in Lombardy, and belonged to the family that later gave rise to the Thurns and Taxis.

The name of Jacques de Taxi appears for the first time as a knight of the Order of St. John of Jerusalem at Acre in 1266. De Taxi was appointed Prior of Messina by the Grand Master Hugues de Revel on 3 July 1269. While pope Clement IV had asked the Hospitallers of Sicily, as early as October 1267, to help Charles I of Anjou, the last son of Louis VIII of France, in his struggle to establish himself as king, it was de Taxi who asked Charles in September 1269 to protect the Hospitallers and their property. The king of Naples and Sicily asked his officers to do so. In June 1272, Charles confirmed to de Taxi that the Hospitallers had the right to graze and water their horses on Crown lands and to collect wood, exempting them from taxes.

== In service to the king of Sicily ==
Because of the good relations maintained between Charles I of Anjou and Jacques de Taxi, pope Gregory X delegated the Prior of Sicily, on 16 December 1271, to the king of Sicily. De Taxi received the functions of adviser to the king and officer of his army, but he mainly fulfilled the functions of treasurer of the king. He also put the fleet of the Order at the disposal of the king. On 18 April 1273, he sold the king a new galley, ready to sail, for 100 ounces of gold. In 1270, Charles I had appointed Giovanni da Lentini, Captain General of War for the whole of Sicily, with Foulques de Puyricard and Jacques de Taxi as deputies. Their mission was to suppress the persistent Swabian rebellion against the Angevin government. Jacques de Taxi received the surrender of the castle of Reggio Calabria from the hands of the partisans of Conradin. In September 1272, Charles I of Anjou formed an embassy composed of the jurist Robert l'Enfant, Matteo de Riso of Messina and Nicolò de Ebdemonia of Palermo in order to intervene with Muhammad I al-Mustansir, the sultan of Tunis and a vassal of the Kingdom of Sicily, to collect the tribute that the sultan owed . He added to this embassy men of confidence like Giovanni da Lentini and Jacques de Taxi. He asked the latter to return to Sicily the wood of the engines of war left in Tunisia when the crusader armies returned to Sicily after the Eighth Crusade. Charles asked de Taxi to come and join him in Foggia to discuss the latest news from the Holy Land. Charles intervened with the Grand Master in favor of Jacques de Taxi who was named prior of the Grand Priory of Barletta on 20 January 1278, replacing Pierre d'Avignon. He held this position until 6 July 1281.

== Grand Commander of the Order ==
Jacques de Taxi regularly intervened with Charles I of Anjou to obtain authorization to transfer from Sicily relief to the Holy Land and to provide all the products and equipment that the Hospitallers needed there. When, in July 1281, de Taxi returned to the Holy Land at Acre at the request of the Grand Master Nicolas Lorgne to take up the post of Grand Commander. He was authorized to take "2,000 salms of wheat, 1,000 of barley and 300 of legumes, as well as 100 mounts (40 mules and 60 horses) [...] the bread necessary for his own and his family's nourishment, as well as the barley indispensable for the nourishment of the mounts during the journey."

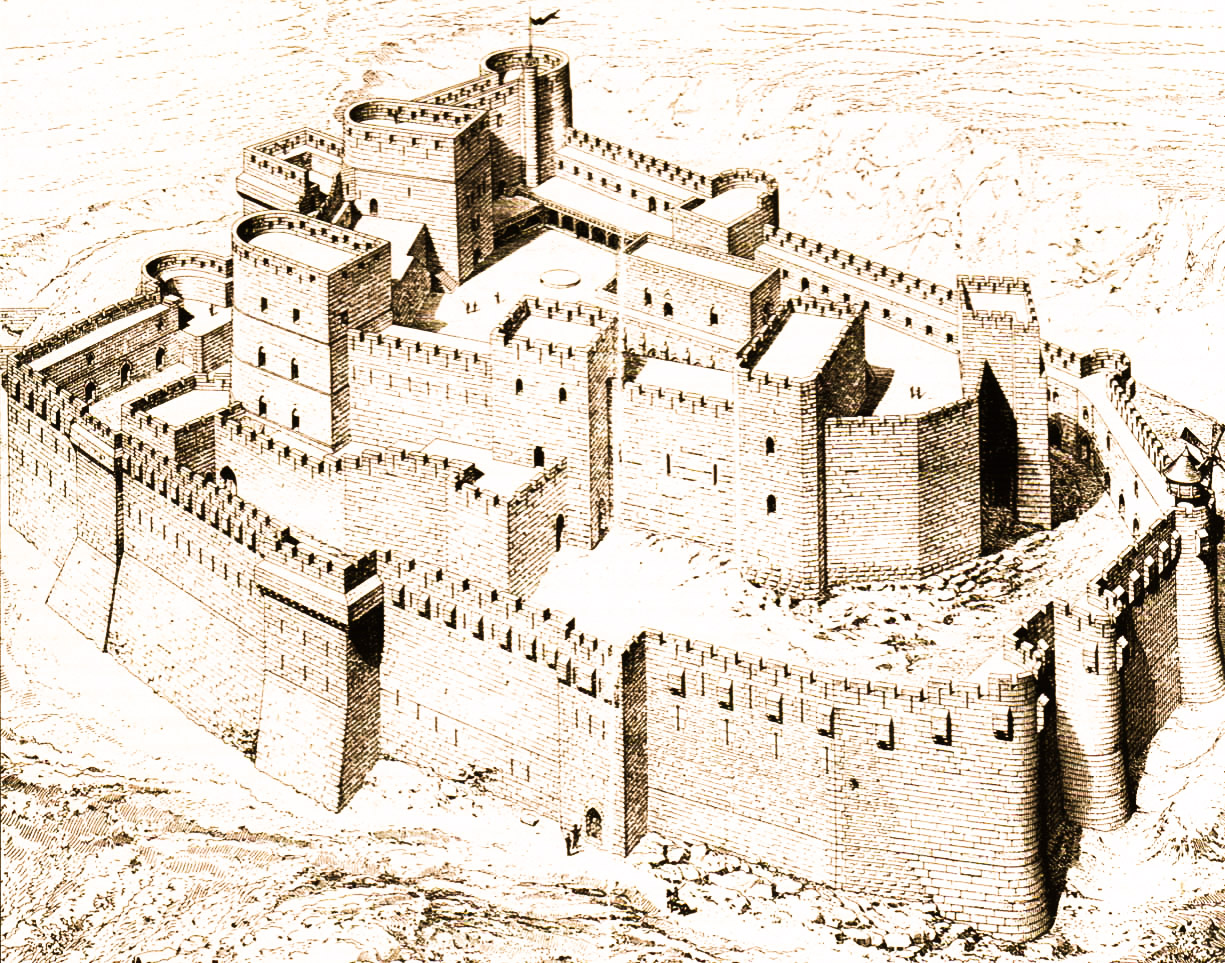
Artist's impression in 1871 of the Krak des Chevaliers, showing its 13th century Zwinger system around the inner ward

== Transition ==
In September 1285, Jean de Villiers was elected Grand Master after the death of Nicolas Lorgne. De Villiers, who had been Prior of France since 1282, remained in France to deal with the many problems of the Order. It was then Jacques de Taxi, as Grand Commander, who became Lieutenant ad interim of the Grand Master, perhaps through 27 June 1286, while awaiting the arrival of the Grand Master in the Holy Land.

== See also ==
- Cartulaire général de l'Ordre des Hospitaliers
- List of Knights Hospitaller sites
- Langue (Knights Hospitaller)
- Flags of the Knights Hospitaller

== Bibliography ==
- Allaz, Camille (2013). Histoire de la poste dans le monde. Pygmalion, Département de Flamarion, Paris. ISBN 9782756411545.
- Baldwin, Philip Bruce (2014). Pope Gregory X and the Crusades. Boydell & Brewer Ltd. ISBN 9781843839163.
- Bronstein, Judith (2005). The Hospitallers and the Holy Land: Financing the Latin East, 1187-1274. Boydell Press. ISBN 9781843831310.
- Claverie, Pierre-Vincent (2020). Frankish Epigraphy. The French of Outremer, Fordham University.
- Delaville Le Roulx, Joseph (1904). Les Hospitaliers en Terre Sainte et à Chypre (1100-1310). E. Leroux, Paris.
- Demurger, Alain (2013). Les Hospitaliers, De Jérusalem à Rhodes 1050-1317. Tallandier, Paris. ISBN 979-1021000605.
- Ellenblum, Ronnie (2016). In Laudem Hierosolymitani: Studies in Crusades and Medieval Culture in Honour of Benjamin Z. Kedar. Routledge Publishing. ISBN 9781351928243.
- Flavigny, Bertrand Galimard (2006). Histoire de l'ordre de Malte. Perrin, Paris. ISBN 978-2262021153.
- Harot, Eugène (1911). Essai d'armorial des grands maîtres de l'Ordre de Saint-Jean de Jérusalem. Collegio araldico.
- Hitti, Philip Khuri (1937). History of the Arabs. Macmillan, New York.
- Jamison, Evelyn (1992). Studies on the history of medieval Sicily and South Italy. Scientia Verlag. ISBN 978-3511092153.
- Josserand, Philippe (2009). Prier et combattre, Dictionnaire européen des ordres militaires au Moyen Âge. Fayard, Paris. ISBN 978-2213627205.
- Kennedy, Hugh (1994). Crusader Castles. Cambridge University Press. ISBN 9780521799133.
- Lock, Peter (2006). The Routledge Companion to the Crusades. Routledge. doi:10.4324/9780203389638. ISBN 0-415-39312-4.
- Murray, Alan V. (2006). The Crusades—An Encyclopedia. ABC-CLIO. ISBN 978-1-57607-862-4.
- Nicholson, Helen J. (2001). The Knights Hospitaller. Boydell & Brewer. ISBN 978-1843830382.
- Riley-Smith, Jonathan (1973). The Feudal Nobility and the Kingdom of Jerusalem, 1174-1277. Macmillan. ISBN 978-0333063798.
- Runciman, Steven (1954). A History of the Crusades, Volume Three: The Kingdom of Acre and the Later Crusades. Cambridge University Press. ISBN 9780521347723.
- Setton, Kenneth M. (1969). A History of the Crusades. University of Wisconsin Press.
- Tyerman, Christopher (2006). God's War: A New History of the Crusades. Belknap Press. ISBN 978-0-674-02387-1.
- Vann, Theresa M. (2006). Order of the Hospital. The Crusades––An Encyclopedia, pp. 598–605.

Preceded by Hugues de Revel	Grand Master of the Knights Hospitaller; 1285–1285	Succeeded by Jean de Villiers
