= Matthew of Clermont =

Marshal of the Knights Hospitaller

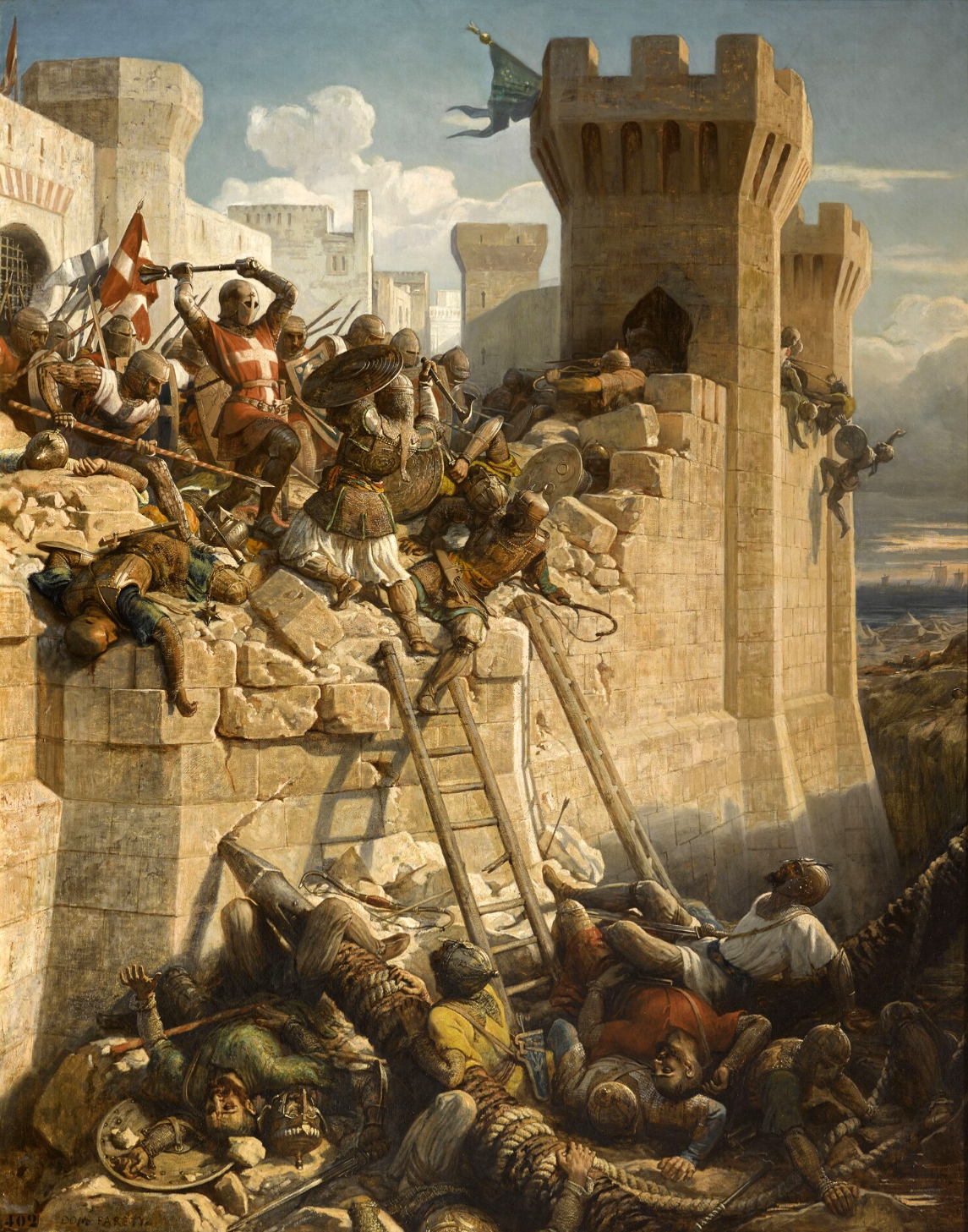
The Hospitaller Maréchal, Matthew of Clermont, defending the walls at the siege of Acre, 1291, by Dominique Papety (1815–49) at Versailles

Matthew of Clermont (died May 18, 1291, in Acre) was a knight of the Order of the Hospitallers, then he last served as Marshal.

== Biography ==
Matthew led the Knights Hospitallers in defending Tripoli against the Mamluks in 1289. The city had to be abandoned on April 26, forty monks were killed in the battle, he himself was one of the few who managed to escape by sea.

He was one of the outstanding protagonists in the defense of Acre, the last crusader stronghold in the Holy Land, which had been besieged by the Mamluks under Sultan Al-Ashraf Khalil since April 1291. When the Mamluks entered the city on May 16, Matthew stopped the defenders fleeing to the port, then counter-attacked, pushing the Mamluks back out of the city from the Saint Anthony's Gate. When the city was stormed again on May 18, he fought again in the front line and was killed in the Genoese quarter.

== Tribute ==
The badly injured Grand Master Jean de Villiers paid tribute to his Marshal shortly after the fall of Acre:

”He was noble, courageous, and well-versed with arms. May God have mercy on him!”

— Jean de Villiers, letter to the Grand Master of Provence, 1291,

== Bibliography ==
- Thaddeus of Napoli (2004). Robert B. C. Huygens (ed.). Excidii Aconis gestorum collectio; Ystoria de desolatione et concvlcatione civitatis Acconensis et tocivs terre sancta. Turnholti.
