= Nicolas Lorgne =

French friar (died 1285)

Nicolas Lorgne (died 1285) was the grand master of the Knights Hospitaller, serving first from 1277 until 1285 and was the successor to Hugues de Revel. He was succeeded by Jean de Villiers, with Jacques de Taxi acting as Grand Master ad interim while de Villiers was en route to the Holy Land.

== Biography ==
Of perhaps French origin, nothing can situate his origin except the disinence of his name. Lorgne first appears towards 1250 in the Holy Land where he could have been Châtelain of the fortress of Margat. In 1255, he became lord of the Krak des Chevaliers, he became Marshal from 1266 to 1269 and then from June to October 1271, then he became Grand Commander from 1271 to 1273 and then Marshal again on 7 October 1273 before being in charge of the Commandery of Tripoli. On 1 July 1277, he became Grand Commander again before his election as Grand Master.

Lorgne was a knight who served for many years as the castellan of the castle of Krac des Chevaliers, where he made improvements in the mid-13th century. An inscription records that he had a barbacane built, probably a reference to the zwinger system around the castle, which can be dated to around 1250. About the year 1270, this was improved and extended. Nevertheless in 1271 the Muslims under Baibars captured Krac des Chevaliers after a four-week siege.

== Grand Master of the Order ==
The precise date of Lorgne's election to the post of Grand Master is unknown other that the year 1277. Nicolas Lorgne continued the reform policy of his predecessor Hugues de Revel. He presided over two general chapters in 1278 and 1283. The second of which took important resolutions with the creation of a capitular bull and especially the generalization of the red habit with the white cross for all the brothers in combat. This decision was obtained by Hugues Revel from pope Alexander IV on 11 August 1259 but only for the knights.

The rights of Hugh III of Lusignan, the king of Cyprus, to the throne of Jerusalem were contested by Maria of Antioch who, in exchange for an annual rent of 4,000 pounds and 1,000 gold coins, had ceded her claims to Charles I of Anjou. On 7 June 1277, the arrival of Roger of San Severino, Count of Marsico, regent in Jerusalem for Charles I, caused panic among the barons. The agreement of the pope, Charles I of Anjou, Marie of Antioch and the hesitations of Hugh III, decided them to take side for Charles I. In 1278, hostilities resumed between the Templars and Bohemond VII of Tripoli and it was the intervention of Lorgne that allowed a return to peace.

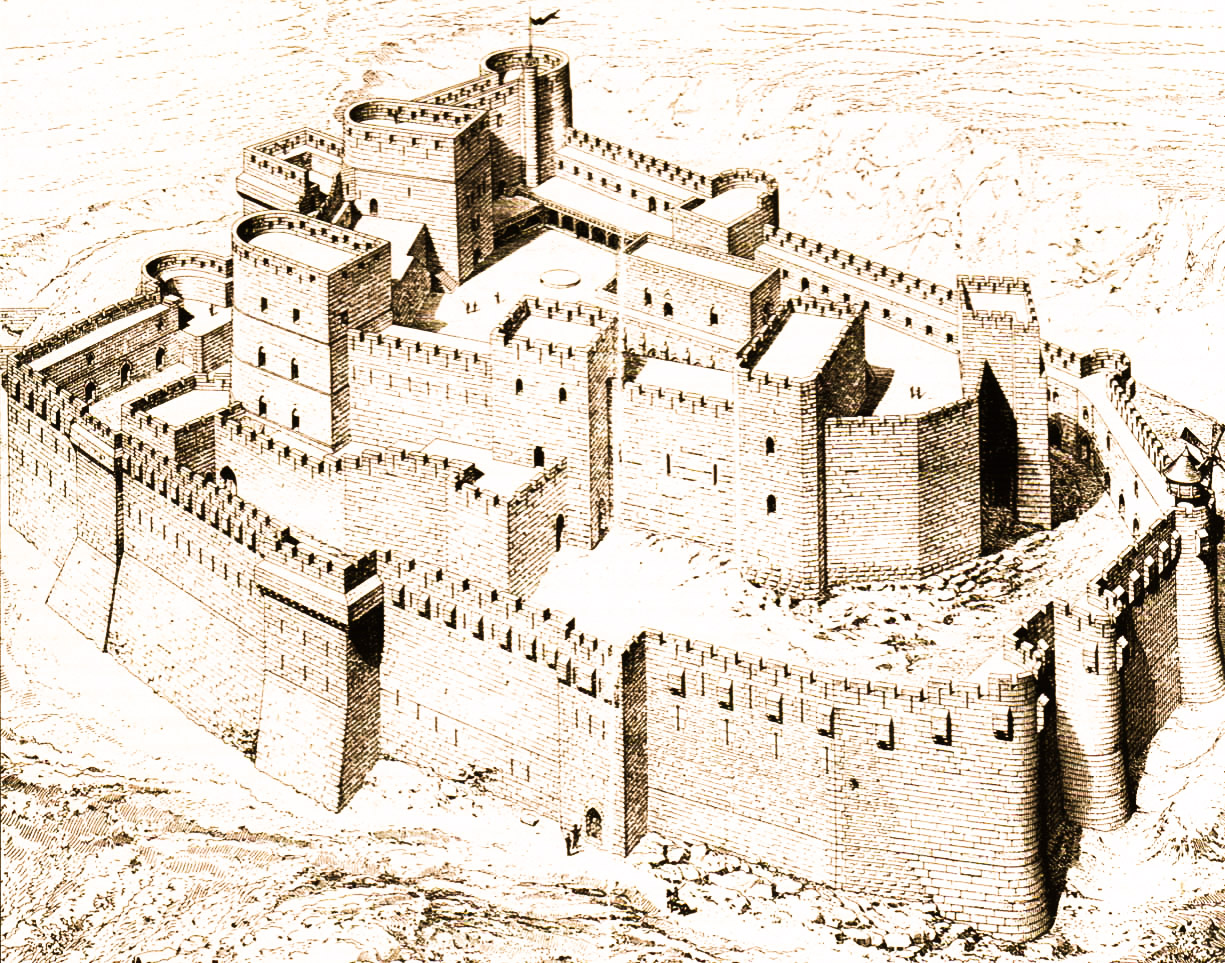
Artist's impression in 1871 of the Krak des Chevaliers, showing its 13th century Zwinger system around the inner ward

Nicolas Lorgne's policy towards the Mongols was perhaps more personal. In 1280, the Mongol invasion of Syria was met without serious resistance from the Mamluk defenders. The Hospitallers, from the fortress of Margat, took advantage of the total disorganization that prevailed, made a sortie with 200 knights and raided the region to take considerable booty. At the end of October 1280, on their way back, they faced a troop of 5,000 Turkoman horsemen whom they routed (losing only one sergeant-at-arms) despite their numerical inferiority. In February 1281, the emir of the Krak des Chevaliers, now under Badr al-Din Solamish, wanted revenge and attacked the Hospitallers with 7,000 horsemen. The Order deployed 600 horsemen and the emir's defeat was complete. The Hospitallers lost one knight and 12 sergeants.

The new sultan of Egypt, al-Mansûr Qalawun, made an agreement with the Mamluk na'ib of Damascus, Sunqur al-Ashqar, on 24 June 1281. He also concluded a truce with the Hospitallers and the Count of Tripoli for 10 years, 10 months, 10 weeks and 10 days. After a bloody battle between the Mongols and the troops of Damascus without winner or loser, al-Mansûr announced that he was going to take revenge for the failure of Margat. The Hospitallers accumulated supplies and forces in the fortress of Margat and improved the defenses, but this did not prevent them from deploying a contingent of 100 horsemen composed of 50 lances taken from among the knights and 50 turcopoles to the king of Armenia.

On 17 April 1285, in spite of the agreement of peace, al-Mansûr attacked Margat. He set fire to a part of the walls and at the moment of taking advantage of the breach thus created the tower of Hope collapsed and came to obstruct the breach on May 23. The Hospitallers negotiated their surrender and Margat capitulated on May 25. They were allowed to leave with 2,000 gold coins and what 25 mules could carry. They left for Tripoli and Tortosa.

== Transition ==
We are not certain that Nicolas Lorgne knew the fall of Margat. His last mention dates from 27 September 1283 and the first mention of his successor Jean de Villiers dates from September 1285. His death is estimated to have occurred on 12 March 1284. Within weeks of the surrender of Margat, Lorgne died. Grand Commander Jacques de Taxi was appointed Grand Master ad interim prior to the arrival of Jean de Villiers in the Holy Land.

== See also ==
- Cartulaire général de l'Ordre des Hospitaliers
- List of Knights Hospitaller sites
- Langue (Knights Hospitaller)
- Flags of the Knights Hospitaller

== Bibliography ==
- Bronstein, Judith (2005). The Hospitallers and the Holy Land: Financing the Latin East, 1187-1274. Boydell Press. ISBN 9781843831310.
- Claverie, Pierre-Vincent (2020). Frankish Epigraphy. The French of Outremer, Fordham University.
- Delaville Le Roulx, Joseph (1904). Les Hospitaliers en Terre Sainte et à Chypre (1100-1310). E. Leroux, Paris.
- Demurger, Alain (2013). Les Hospitaliers, De Jérusalem à Rhodes 1050-1317. Tallandier, Paris. ISBN 979-1021000605.
- Ellenblum, Ronnie (2016). In Laudem Hierosolymitani: Studies in Crusades and Medieval Culture in Honour of Benjamin Z. Kedar. Routledge Publishing. ISBN 9781351928243.
- Flavigny, Bertrand Galimard (2006). Histoire de l'ordre de Malte. Perrin, Paris. ISBN 978-2262021153.
- Harot, Eugène (1911). Essai d'armorial des grands maîtres de l'Ordre de Saint-Jean de Jérusalem. Collegio araldico.
- Hitti, Philip Khuri (1937). History of the Arabs. Macmillan, New York.
- Josserand, Philippe (2009). Prier et combattre, Dictionnaire européen des ordres militaires au Moyen Âge. Fayard, Paris. ISBN 978-2213627205.
- Kennedy, Hugh (1994). Crusader Castles. Cambridge University Press. ISBN 9780521799133.
- Lock, Peter (2006). The Routledge Companion to the Crusades. Routledge. doi:10.4324/9780203389638. ISBN 0-415-39312-4.
- Murray, Alan V. (2006). The Crusades—An Encyclopedia. ABC-CLIO. ISBN 978-1-57607-862-4. Archived from the original on 2023-03-26.
- Nicholson, Helen J. (2001). The Knights Hospitaller. Boydell & Brewer. ISBN 978-1843830382.
- Riley-Smith, Jonathan (1973). The Feudal Nobility and the Kingdom of Jerusalem, 1174-1277. Macmillan. ISBN 978-0333063798.
- Runciman, Steven (1952). A History of the Crusades, Volume Two: The Kingdom of Jerusalem and the Frankish East, 1100-1187. Cambridge University Press. ISBN 9780521347716.
- Setton, Kenneth M. (1969). A History of the Crusades. University of Wisconsin Press.
- Tyerman, Christopher (2006). God's War: A New History of the Crusades. Belknap Press. ISBN 978-0-674-02387-1.
- Vann, Theresa M. (2006). Order of the Hospital. The Crusades––An Encyclopedia, pp. 598–605.

Preceded by Hugues de Revel	Grand Master of the Knights Hospitaller; 1277–1285	Succeeded by Jacques de Taxi
