= The Sowers of the Thunder =

- Short story by Robert E. Howard
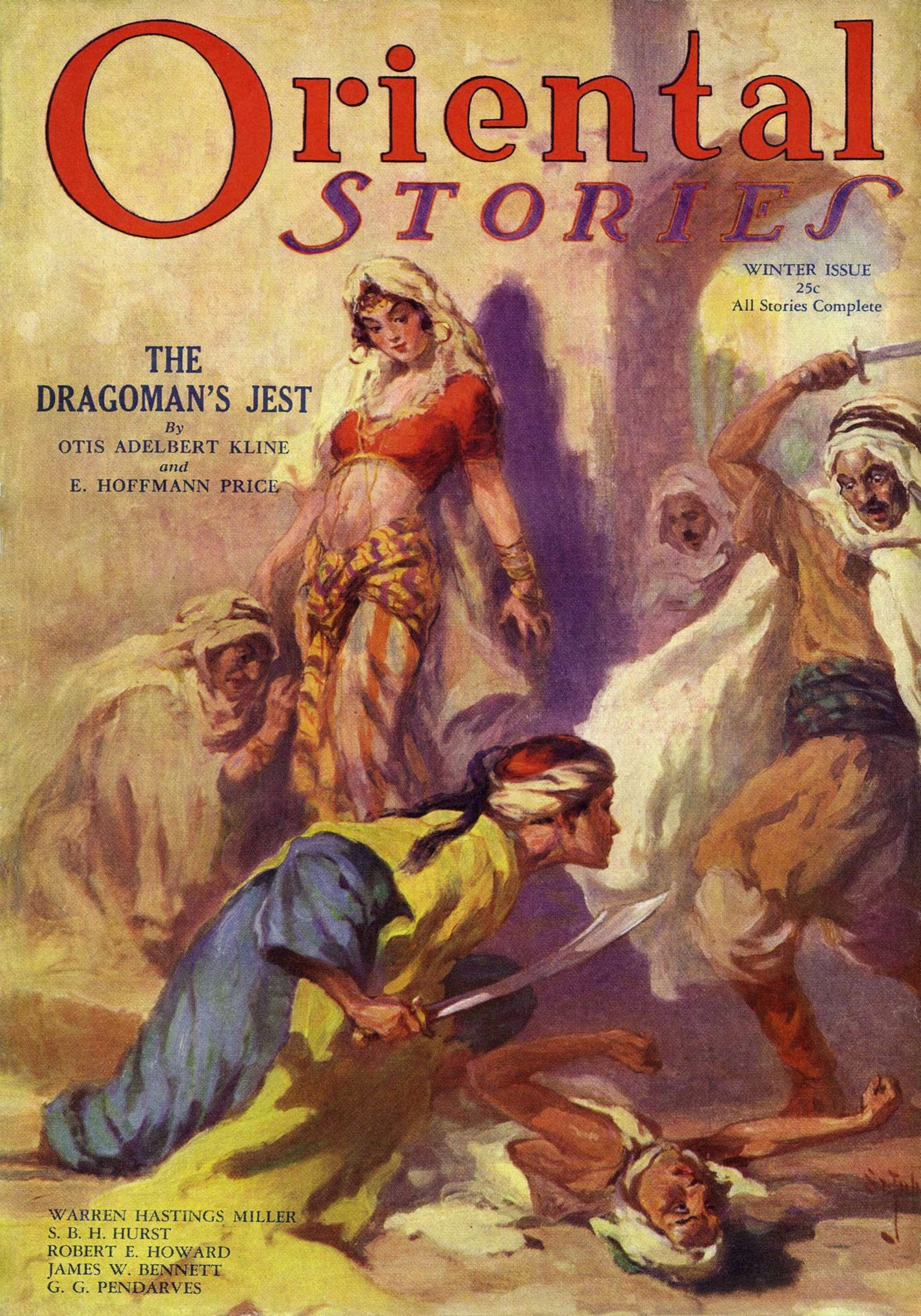
- Country: United States
- Language: English
- Genre: Historical fiction

Publication
- Published in: Oriental Stories
- Media type: Pulp magazine
- Publication date: Winter 1932

"The Sowers of the Thunder" is a historical fiction short story by American writer Robert E. Howard, originally published in Oriental Stories, Winter 1932. It takes place in Outremer (the Crusader states) in the time of General Baibars and deals with the General's friendly/adversarial relationship with Cahal Ruadh O'Donnell, an Irish Crusader with a troubled past cut in the Howardian mold. Both the Siege of Jerusalem (1244) and the Battle of La Forbie feature in the plot.

As is common for Howard's historical fiction, this tale is tragic as much as it is heroic, pitting the protagonist's superhuman strength and resolution against a world that is yet stronger, and too harsh to resist. Another trait of the story common to Howard's historical tales is the mix of historical figures and events (here Baibars, Walter of Brienne, Al-Mansur and others, and the prelude to Baibars' Mamluk empire) with totally imaginary ones (such as deposed "King of Ireland" Cahal).

== Reception ==
In an article on Howard's historical fiction, Don D'Ammassa wrote that "The Sowers of the Thunder" "is perhaps Howard's most historically rich tale, filled with colorful images and descriptive passages that demonstrate the careful research that must have taken place before these stories were written." He also described "The Sowers of the Thunder" as "one of Howard's finest stories, despite an over reliance on coincidence."
