= Siraj al-Din Dhabyan =

Sultan al-Harafish Kabir al-Harafish Siraj al-Din Dhabyan
- سراج الدين ظبيان
- Born: Egypt
- Military career
- Allegiance: Egyptian Mamluk Sultanate
- Branch: Egyptian army
- Unit: al-Harafish brigades
- Commands: commander of the al-Harafish brigades
- Conflicts: Siege of Acre (1291)

Siraj al-Din Dhabyan (Egyptian Arabic: سراج الدين ظبيان) was an Egyptian military leader and the commander of the al-Harafish brigades and the leader of the final attack that stormed the Crusader walls of Acre.

== Siege of Acre ==
The Crusaders tried to sign a truce with Sultan al-Ashraf Khalil in exchange for paying an annual tribute. This was before the siege of Acre, so the al-Harafish stood against these negotiations, repeating with one voice, "We will not make peace with these cursed people", which made al-Ashraf Khalil back down and decide to conquer Acre in the year 691 AH/1291 AD. Siraj al-Din Dhabyan was the commander of the al-Harafish and one of the leaders of the final attack that stormed the Crusader walls of Acre. Siraj al-Din Dhabyan led the al-Harafish, which consisted of the Sa'idi Egyptians and other tough commoners of Cairo. They attacked Acre despite the huge number of arrows that the Crusader soldiers were throwing at them, and he and his soldiers succeeded in the end in breaching one of the walls and raising the yellow flags on the towers of Acre.

After Commander Siraj al-Din Dhabyan and his soldiers entered the palaces and churches of the princes of Acre, he amassed a great fortune that made him one of the richest people in Egypt. This wealth was estimated at 1,700 dinars and 22 thousand dirhams.
