= Odon de Pins =

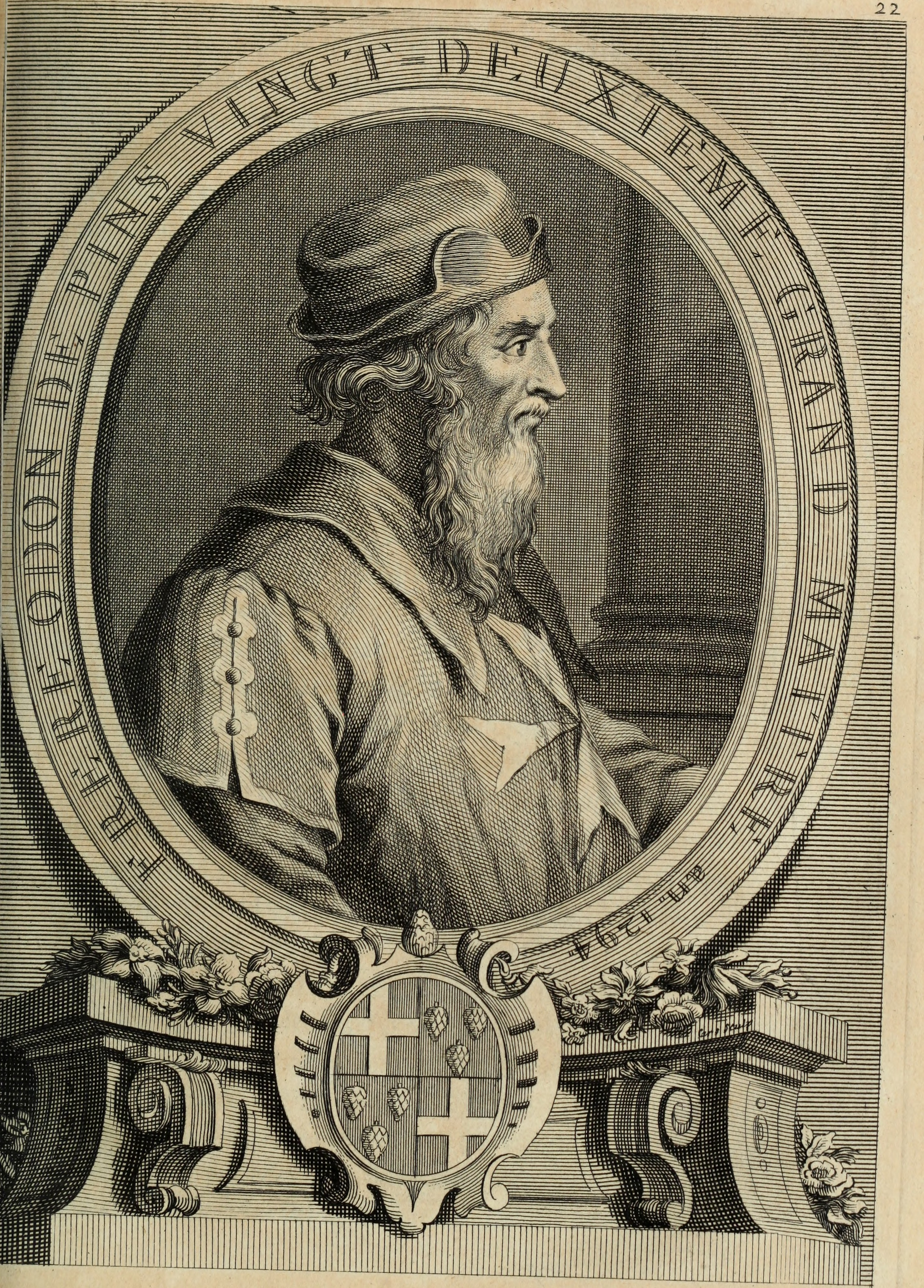
A depiction of Odon de Pins from 1726

Odo de Pins (1212 – 24 March 1296), also known as Eudes de Pin or Odon de Pins, was the twenty-third Grand Master of the Knights Hospitaller, serving from 1294 until his death in 1296, succeeding Jean de Villiers. He moved the headquarters of the Order to Limasso in modern-day Cyprus. Upon his death, he was succeeded by Guillaume de Villaret.

== Biography ==
Odo de Pins was appointed Draper of the Order of Saint John of Jerusalem on 7 October 1273. On 28 December 1287, he was appointed Marshal of the Order. He was elected to the magistracy of Grand Master between the end of 1293 and before 30 September 1294, when he presided over his first General Chapter as Grand Master in Limassol.

As early as 1295, de Pins faced an internal crisis in the Order which was led by Boniface de Calamandrana, Grand Commander of Overseas and Guillaume de Villaret, then Prior of Saint-Gilles. These dignitaries addressed Pope Boniface VIII on 12 August 1295 in order to obtain a reform of the governance of the Order. They wanted the creation of a permanent council composed of seven "definitors" (one representative of each language - not yet officially created and numbering six, not seven - and the Grand Master) who were to assist the Grand Master, control his actions and share with him the main decisions. The pope did not follow up on their proposal, but on 12 August 1295 he sent de Pins a letter of warning which committed the Grand Master to change "his previous errors and to defend the interests of the Order from now on."

It is unknown what the pope and the dignitaries of the Order reproached de Pins for, his piety, one of his characteristics which made him neglect the affairs of the Order, or his authoritarianism which upset the habits, this remains a question in the absence of documents. As de Pins did not take into account Boniface's admonitions, the latter summoned him to appear before the pontifical court. He was about to set out, but he died on 17 March 1296 in Limassol. He was succeeded as Grand Master by Guillaume de Villaret.

== See also ==
- Cartulaire général de l'Ordre des Hospitaliers
- List of Knights Hospitaller sites
- Langue (Knights Hospitaller)
- Flags of the Knights Hospitaller

== Bibliography ==
- Delaville Le Roulx, Joseph (1904). Les Hospitaliers en Terre Sainte et à Chypre (1100-1310). E. Leroux, Paris.
- Demurger, Alain (2013). Les Hospitaliers, De Jérusalem à Rhodes 1050-1317. Tallandier, Paris. ISBN 979-1021000605.
- Flavigny, Bertrand Galimard (2006). Histoire de l'ordre de Malte. Perrin, Paris. ISBN 978-2262021153.
- Harot, Eugène (1911). Essai d'armorial des grands maîtres de l'Ordre de Saint-Jean de Jérusalem. Collegio araldico.
- Hitti, Philip Khuri (1937). History of the Arabs. Macmillan, New York.
- Josserand, Philippe (2009). Prier et combattre, Dictionnaire européen des ordres militaires au Moyen Âge. Fayard, Paris. ISBN 978-2213627205.
- Lock, Peter (2006). The Routledge Companion to the Crusades. Routledge. doi:10.4324/9780203389638. ISBN 0-415-39312-4.
- Luke, Harry (1969). The Kingdom of Cyprus, 1291–1369 (PDF). A History of the Crusades (Setton), Volume III. Archived from the original (PDF) on 2022-05-03.
- Murray, Alan V. (2006). The Crusades—An Encyclopedia. ABC-CLIO. ISBN 978-1-57607-862-4. Archived from the original on 2023-03-26.
- Nicholson, Helen J. (2001). The Knights Hospitaller. Boydell & Brewer. ISBN 978-1843830382.
- Runciman, Steven (1954). A History of the Crusades, Volume Three: The Kingdom of Acre and the Later Crusades. Cambridge University Press. ISBN 9780521347723.
- Setton, Kenneth M. (1969). A History of the Crusades. University of Wisconsin Press.
- Vann, Theresa M. (2006). Order of the Hospital. The Crusades––An Encyclopedia, pp. 598–605.
- Zaida, Mustafa (1969). The Mamluk Sultans, 1291–1517 (PDF). A History of the Crusades (Setton), Volume III. Archived from the original (PDF) on 2022-05-03.

| Preceded by Jean de Villiers | Grand Master of the Knights Hospitaller; 1294–1296 | Succeeded by Guillaume de Villaret |
