= Guillaume de Chateauneuf =

19th Grand Master of the Knights Hospitaller in Malta

Guillaume de Chateauneuf (died c. 1258, in Acre) was the nineteenth Grand Master of the Knights Hospitaller, serving first from 1242–1244 as the successor to Pierre de Vieille-Brioude. He was captured during the Battle of La Forbie in 1244, held hostage in Egypt and ransomed through the Seventh Crusade. During his captivity, his position was filled on an interim basis by Jean de Ronay. De Ronay died in 1250, and de Chateauneuf was released shortly thereafter. He was succeeded by Hugues de Revel.

== Biography ==
Guillaume de Chateauneuf, a French knight, joined the Order on 3 October 1233 and became Marshal of the Order (Maréchal de l'Ordre) on 18 November 1241. He took over the leadership of the Order on 31 May 1242. He was taken prisoner and replaced in his duties as Grand Master by Jean de Ronay. However, the date of his death is not known; he was already replaced by his successor Hugues de Revel on 9 October 1258, but he was still in office on 20 February 1258 and most probably died in the summer of 1258.

== Possession and loss of Jerusalem ==
When de Chateauneuf took over as Grand Master, the Ayyubids were in full competition and had just left Jerusalem to the Christians. The Templars began fortifying the city in 1244 when the Khwarezmian invasion occurred. This Turkish tribe, which had invaded Mesopotamia, was called by the Sultan of Egypt: they seized Tiberias, Safed and Tripoli and began the Siege of Jerusalem on 15 July 1244, where the walls were very inadequate following the agreement between Frederick II and al-Kamil. The patriarch of Jerusalem, Robert of Nantes, and the Grand Masters of the Temple and the Hospitallers, having come to raise the courage of the inhabitants, repelled the attackers but the imperial lord and the great tutor of the Hospital lost their lives in the battle. In the confusion, the inhabitants left Jerusalem on 15 July, but saw the banners of the Christians flying on the city walls; deceived, they turned back and were all massacred, while the city was sacked.

== Battle of La Forbie ==
The forces allied to the Christians, associated with the Templars, the Hospitallers and Teutonic Knights, and the Muslims of Syria and Transjordan left Acre on 4 October 1244, marched on Jaffa and fell on the Khwarezmians and the Egyptian troops on 17 October. In the Battle of La Forbie, near Gaza, the Muslim allies dropped out at the first encounter and the Christians found themselves alone. The unequal fighting ended in disaster; 16,000 men lost their lives and 800 were taken prisoner, among them 325 knights and 200 turcopoles of the Hospitallers, including de Chateauneuf, who was taken to Cairo; only 18 Templars and 16 Hospitallers were able to escape.

It was then that Jean de Ronay took over as interim Grand Master. He had been the Grand Tutor of the Hospital during the battle of La Forbie, and became lieutenant ad interim while waiting for the release of de Chateauneuf.

== The liberation of de Chateauneuf ==
The loss of Jerusalem and the defeat at La Forbie essentially eliminated Western military power in the Holy Land. Louis IX of France was compelled to respond, resulting in the Seventh Crusade. After its disastrous results (which included the death of Jean de Ronay), Louis IX returned to Acre on 13 May 1250. He was urged on all sides to return to France, but he did not want to leave the Holy Land until he had secured the release of the prisoners. To hasten their release, he twice delegated Jean de Valencienne, who thanks to these efforts obtained the release of a large number of prisoners, including Guillaume de Chateauneuf and twenty-five Hospitallers who arrived in Acre on 17 October 1250. In 1256, a ten-year truce was concluded between Aybak, effectively ruler of Egypt, an-Nasir Yusuf, sultan of Damascus, and the barons of the Holy Land, the Knights Templar and the Hospitallers, the king of France, represented by Geoffrey of Sergines, and the Count of Jaffa, John of Ibelin.

== The war between Genoa and Venice ==
The Genoese and the Venetians had shared possession of the church of Saint Sabas, and each wanted exclusive possession, leading to the War of Saint Sabas. The pope thought he had solved the problem by committing the abbot to sell the church to the Genoese, but then reversed his decision. Those who had sided with the rights of Hugh II of Lusignan rallied around the Venetians, including the Templars, and those who had sided with Conradin, including the Hospitallers, rallied around the Genoese. The Hospitallers waited for the success of the Genoese fleet around Acre with the contingent gathered by Philippe de Montfort. But, on 24 June 1258, it was the failure of the Genoese fleet, the Venetians ruin their district in Acre by sharing it and the prisoners are led to Tyre. This marked the end of hostilities.

Guillaume de Chateauneuf died shortly thereafter and was succeeded by Hugues de Revel.

== See also ==
- Cartulaire général de l'Ordre des Hospitaliers
- List of Knights Hospitaller sites
- Langue (Knights Hospitaller)
- Flags of the Knights Hospitaller

== Bibliography ==
- Bronstein, Judith (2005). The Hospitallers and the Holy Land: Financing the Latin East, 1187-1274. Boydell Press. ISBN 9781843831310.
- Claverie, Pierre-Vincent (2020). Frankish Epigraphy. The French of Outremer, Fordham University.
- Delaville Le Roulx, Joseph (1904). Les Hospitaliers en Terre Sainte et à Chypre (1100-1310). E. Leroux, Paris.
- Demurger, Alain (2013). Les Hospitaliers, De Jérusalem à Rhodes 1050-1317. Tallandier, Paris. ISBN 979-1021000605.
- Flavigny, Bertrand Galimard (2006). Histoire de l'ordre de Malte. Perrin, Paris. ISBN 978-2262021153.
- Harot, Eugène (1911). Essai d'armorial des grands maîtres de l'Ordre de Saint-Jean de Jérusalem. Collegio araldico.
- Josserand, Philippe (2009). Prier et combattre, Dictionnaire européen des ordres militaires au Moyen Âge. Fayard, Paris. ISBN 978-2213627205.
- Lock, Peter (2006). The Routledge Companion to the Crusades. Routledge. doi:10.4324/9780203389638. ISBN 0-415-39312-4.
- Murray, Alan V. (2006). The Crusades—An Encyclopedia. ABC-CLIO. ISBN 978-1-57607-862-4.
- Nicholson, Helen J. (2001). The Knights Hospitaller. Boydell & Brewer. ISBN 978-1843830382.
- Riley-Smith, Jonathan (1973). The Feudal Nobility and the Kingdom of Jerusalem, 1174-1277. Macmillan. ISBN 978-0333063798.
- Runciman, Steven (1954). A History of the Crusades, Volume Three: The Kingdom of Acre and the Later Crusades. Cambridge University Press. ISBN 9780521347723.
- Setton, Kenneth M. (1969). A History of the Crusades. University of Wisconsin Press.
- Tyerman, Christopher (2006). God's War: A New History of the Crusades. Belknap Press. ISBN 978-0-674-02387-1.
- Vann, Theresa M. (2006). Order of the Hospital. The Crusades––An Encyclopedia, pp. 598–605.

Preceded by Pierre de Vieille-Brioude	Grand Master of the Knights Hospitaller; 1242–1244	Succeeded by Jean de Ronay
Preceded by Jean de Ronay	Grand Master of the Knights Hospitaller; 1250–1258	Succeeded by Hugues de Revel
