= Jean de Ronay =

Order of Saint John knight

Jean de Ronay (died 11 February 1250, Mansurah, Egypt) was knight of the Order of Saint John of Jerusalem who was appointed Grand Commander of the Knights Hospitaller by the Grand Master Guillaume de Chateauneuf in 1243 or 1244. He served as interim Grand Master of the Knights Hospitaller from 1244 to 1250 during the captivity of de Chateauneuf. He died in battle during the Seventh Crusade.

== Biography ==
In is unknown when de Ronay was born or when he joined the Order. It is known that he was a senior knight in good standing in 1245 when he assumed the position of interim Grand Master during the captivity of Guillaume de Chateauneuf. He died in battle on 11 February 1250, eight months before the release of de Chateauneuf.

The Knights Hospitaller were left leaderless with the capture of de Chateauneuf on 18 October 1244. De Ronay, being the next highest ranking Hospitalier, took the responsibility of the Grand Master ad interim. He was confirmed in this functions, until the return from captivity of the titular superior, by the conventual general assembly of the Hospitallers in 1245.

De Ronay served in as interim Grand Master through the Seventh Crusade, led by Louis IX of France. He was killed in the line of duty at the final encounter of Louis' Crusade, on 11 February 1250 prior to the Battle of Fariskur.

== Battle of La Forbie ==
After the siege of Siege of Jerusalem of 15 July 1244 destroyed the Holy City, the Kingdom of Jerusalem planned a counterattack. Together with the Hospitaller, Knights Templar and Knights Teutonic, the allied with the Transjordanian troops of al-Mansur Ibrahim and an-Nasir Dā’ūd. This army was placed under the command of Walter IV of Brienne and moved to fight the Ayyubids and Khwarezmians commanded by Baibars, future sultan of Egypt.

On 17–18 October 1244, the Crusader troops, which included approximately 1,000 cavalry and 6,000 foot soldiers, engaged in the Battle of La Forbie, were decisively defeated by Baibars. The approximately 800 prisoners included Walter IV of Brienne and Guillaume de Chateauneuf. Only 280 horsemen (including 33 Templars, 27 Hospitallers, 3 Teutonics and the Lord of Tyre, Philip of Montfort) and a thousand soldiers survived the defeat which marked the end of Christian military power in the Holy Land.

== Appointment as interim Grand Master ==
It was then that de Ronay was appointed as the interim Grand Master, as he was the Grand Tutor of the Hospital during the Battle of Forbie. Only the castles of Safed and Ascalon had defended themselves against the onslaught. Ascalon, guarded by the Hospitallers, resisted Baibars' attack. The Khwarezmians continued to attack Acre and Jaffa. In the fall of 1245, it was the capture of Damascus by Egyptian troops aided by the Khwarezmians that which put Egypt and Syria in the hands of as-Salih Ayyub. In 1246, Muslim troops began unsuccessful sieges of Ascalon, Acre and the Templar stronghold of Château Pèlerin, but Tiberias was captured on June 16, 1247, and finally Ascalon fell.

== The Seventh Crusade and death ==
Help was to come from Louis IX of France, who took the cross in December 1244, beginning the Seventh Crusade. He went to sea from Aigues-Mortes on 25 August 25, 1248, disembarking in Cyprus on 17 September 1248. He arrived with the queen Margaret of Provence and his brothers, the count of Artois and the count of Anjou. At Cyprus awaited them Henry I of Cyprus and the representatives of the military orders, the lieutenant of the Hospitallers ad interim, Jean de Ronay, and the Grand Master of the Templars, Guillaume de Sonnac.

After landing in Egypt, the Crusader force met with initial successes at the Siege of Damietta on 6 June 1249 and at the Battle of Mansurah on 8 February 1250, and it was in the fighting after the latter battle had been decided that de Ronay was killed. It was at the Battle of Fariskur on 6 April 1250 that disaster struck. Louis and many other were captured. Guillaume de Chateauneuf was released eight months later, on 17 October 1250 upon payment of his ransom, and thence returned to the leadership of the Hospitallers.

== See also ==
- Cartulaire général de l'Ordre des Hospitaliers
- List of Knights Hospitaller sites
- Langue (Knights Hospitaller)
- Flags of the Knights Hospitaller

== Bibliography ==
- Barker, Ernest (1923). The Crusades. World's manuals. Oxford University Press, London.
- Bronstein, Judith (2005). The Hospitallers and the Holy Land: Financing the Latin East, 1187-1274. Boydell Press. ISBN 9781843831310.
- Delaville Le Roulx, Joseph (1904). Les Hospitaliers en Terre Sainte et à Chypre (1100-1310). E. Leroux, Paris.
- Demurger, Alain (2013). Les Hospitaliers, De Jérusalem à Rhodes 1050-1317. Tallandier, Paris. ISBN 979-1021000605.
- Furber, Elizabeth Chapin (1969). The Kingdom of Cyprus, 1191-1291 (PDF). A History of the Crusades (Setton), Volume II. Archived from the original (PDF) on 2023-03-26.
- Josserand, Philippe (2009). Prier et combattre, Dictionnaire européen des ordres militaires au Moyen Âge. Fayard, Paris. ISBN 978-2213627205.
- Lock, Peter (2006). The Routledge Companion to the Crusades. Routledge. doi:10.4324/9780203389638. ISBN 0-415-39312-4.
- Murray, Alan V. (2006). The Crusades—An Encyclopedia. ABC-CLIO. ISBN 978-1-57607-862-4. Archived from the original on 2023-03-26.
- Nicholson, Helen J. (2001). The Knights Hospitaller. Boydell & Brewer. ISBN 978-1843830382.
- Runciman, Steven (1954). A History of the Crusades, Volume Three: The Kingdom of Acre and the Later Crusades. Cambridge University Press. ISBN 9780521347723.
- Runciman, Steven (1969). The Crusader States, 1243–1291 (PDF). A History of the Crusades (Setton), Volume II. Archived from the original (PDF) on 2021-10-18.
- Setton, Kenneth M. (1969). A History of the Crusades. University of Wisconsin Press.
- Strayer, Joseph (1969). The Crusades of Louis IX (PDF). A History of the Crusades (Setton), Volume II. Archived from the original (PDF) on 2021-12-07.
- Tyerman, Christopher (2006). God's War: A New History of the Crusades. Belknap Press. ISBN 978-0-674-02387-1.
- Vann, Theresa M. (2006). Order of the Hospital. The Crusades––An Encyclopedia, pp. 598–605.

Preceded by Guillaume de Chateauneuf	Grand Master of the Knights Hospitaller; 1244–1250	Succeeded by Guillaume de Chateauneuf
