= Hugues de Revel =

English knight (died 1277)

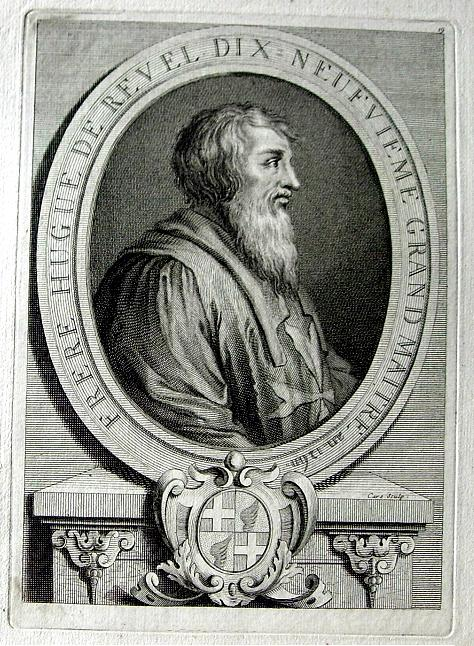

Hugues de Revel (died 1277 in the Holy Land) was an English knight who became the twentieth grand master of the Knights Hospitaller, serving from 1258 to 1277 as the successor to Guillaume de Chateauneuf. He was succeeded by Nicolas Lorgne.

== Origins ==
Born before 1222, by some accounts he was a son of Richard Reynell, a Somerset squire whose father was Richard Reynell (died before 1213), Sheriff of Devon in 1191–4. This attribution is cast in doubt by recent research which suggests that the younger Richard's only heir was a daughter Sabina.

== Administration of the Order ==
Hugues de Revel was Châtelain of the Krak des Chevaliers from 1243 to 1248 and Grand Commander of the Order from 1251 to 1258. In the latter position, he succeeded Jean de Ronay.

Upon the death of Guillaume de Chateauneuf in 1258, Hugues de Revel was elected Grand Master of the Order. His first act was dated 9 October 1258. As soon as he was elected, he had to face the consequences of the War of Saint Sabas. Bohemond VI of Antioch, wanting to take revenge on the Embriaco lords of Gibelet, attacked them and found his allies, the Templars and his opponents William II of Botron and the Hospitallers. The death of Bertrand Embriaco, son of Hugues de Gibelet, put an end to the conflict but the Templars with the brothers of Saint-Lazare and Saint-Thomas attacked the Hospitallers, but this ended in a resounding victory of the Hospitallers and the almost complete massacre of the Templars. The Templars and the Hospitallers were able to overcome their differences in 1262, mainly with the extinction of the claims of Margat and Sidon.

Revel strengthened the Hospitaller domain by acquiring the Benedictine abbey on Mount Tabor, but the consent of the Archbishop of Nazareth was not obtained until 1263. He had direct relations with the Mamluk Sultan Baibars in 1263, 1266 and 1267–1268. The siege of the Templar fortress of Safied by the Mamluk army led the Hospitallers to negotiate a separate truce for the Krak des Chevaliers and the fortress of Margat in 1267, but Baybars' armies seized the Krak in 1271, which did not prevent Revel from negotiating a truce the same year.

Hugues de Revel attached his name to the modification of the statutes of the Order during the general chapters of 1268, 1270, 1274 and 1276 as the compilations of sentences, the "esgarts", and customs, the "usances", fixed between 1239 and 1271 were most certainly made at the instigation of Revel. The success of the administrative activity of Revel is largely due to the treasurer Joseph de Chauncy who officiated from 1248 to 1271 before being called by Edward I of England.

Hugues de Revel died between the second half of 1277 and the first half of 1278. His successor Nicolas Lorgne exercised his magisterium on 16 June 1278.

== Epigraphy from de Revel's magistracy ==
Jean de Valenciennes was twice delegated by Louis IX of France to obtained the release of a large number of prisoners of the Seventh Crusade's Battle of Fariskur, including de Revel's predecessor Guillaume de Chateauneuf. Previous assertions that he was either a Frankish knight or a lord of Haifa who died in 1270 have been shown to be incorrect. Instead, he has been identified as a canon who lived in Acre. His grave is mystifying as the epitaph remains unfinished and is not preceded by a cross. There are proposed explanations that have been offered. Lack of funds could have caused the stonecutter to leave the engraving unfinished. Or the executors decided to return the corpse to the County of Hainaut for final burial, leaving the incomplete epitaph.

== See also ==
- Cartulaire général de l'Ordre des Hospitaliers
- List of Knights Hospitaller sites
- Langue (Knights Hospitaller)
- Flags of the Knights Hospitaller

== Bibliography ==
- Bronstein, Judith (2005). The Hospitallers and the Holy Land: Financing the Latin East, 1187-1274. Boydell Press. ISBN 9781843831310.
- Claverie, Pierre-Vincent (2020). Frankish Epigraphy. The French of Outremer, Fordham University.
- Delaville Le Roulx, Joseph (1904). Les Hospitaliers en Terre Sainte et à Chypre (1100-1310). E. Leroux, Paris.
- Demurger, Alain (2013). Les Hospitaliers, De Jérusalem à Rhodes 1050-1317. Tallandier, Paris. ISBN 979-1021000605.
- Ellenblum, Ronnie (2016). In Laudem Hierosolymitani: Studies in Crusades and Medieval Culture in Honour of Benjamin Z. Kedar. Routledge Publishing. ISBN 9781351928243.
- Flavigny, Bertrand Galimard (2006). Histoire de l'ordre de Malte. Perrin, Paris. ISBN 978-2262021153.
- Harot, Eugène (1911). Essai d'armorial des grands maîtres de l'Ordre de Saint-Jean de Jérusalem. Collegio araldico.
- Josserand, Philippe (2009). Prier et combattre, Dictionnaire européen des ordres militaires au Moyen Âge. Fayard, Paris. ISBN 978-2213627205.
- Lock, Peter (2006). The Routledge Companion to the Crusades. Routledge. doi:10.4324/9780203389638. ISBN 0-415-39312-4.
- Murray, Alan V. (2006). The Crusades—An Encyclopedia. ABC-CLIO. ISBN 978-1-57607-862-4.
- Nicholson, Helen J. (2001). The Knights Hospitaller. Boydell & Brewer. ISBN 978-1843830382.
- Riley-Smith, Jonathan (1973). The Feudal Nobility and the Kingdom of Jerusalem, 1174-1277. Macmillan. ISBN 978-0333063798.
- Runciman, Steven (1954). A History of the Crusades, Volume Three: The Kingdom of Acre and the Later Crusades. Cambridge University Press. ISBN 9780521347723.
- Setton, Kenneth M. (1969). A History of the Crusades. University of Wisconsin Press.
- Tyerman, Christopher (2006). God's War: A New History of the Crusades. Belknap Press. ISBN 978-0-674-02387-1.
- Vann, Theresa M. (2006). Order of the Hospital. The Crusades––An Encyclopedia, pp. 598–605.

Preceded by Guillaume de Chateauneuf	Grand Master of the Knights Hospitaller; 1258–1277	Succeeded by Nicolas Lorgne
