= Battle of Forbie =

1244 battle during the Crusades

Coordinates: 31°36′20.76″N 34°32′46.89″E

- Part of the Crusades
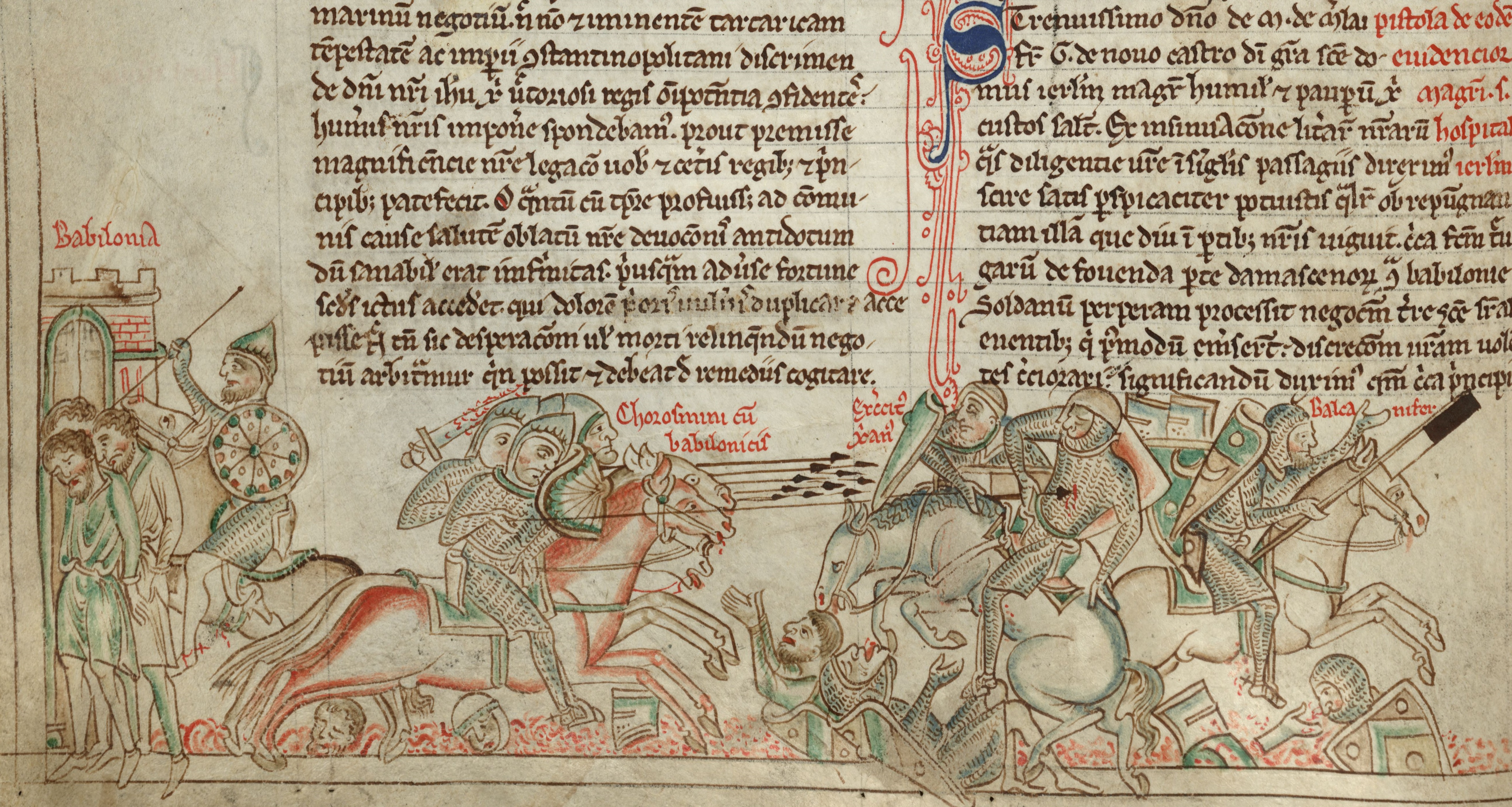
- Battle of Forbie, from Chronica Majora by Matthew Paris
Date	October 17–18, 1244
Location	near the village of Hiribya (Forbie), northeast of Gaza
Result	Ayyubid victory

Belligerents
Ayyubid dynasty Khwarezmian mercenaries	Kingdom of Jerusalem; Knights Templar; Knights Hospitaller; Teutonic Knights; Order of Saint Lazarus; Oultrejordain; Ayyubid Homs; Ayyubid Damascus; Ayyubid Kerak

Commanders and leaders
Overall Commander: As-Salih Ayyub; Field Commanders: Rukn al-Din Baybars al-Salihi; Husam al-Din ibn Abi Ali	Walter IV of Brienne (POW); Guillaume de Chateauneuf (POW); Armand de Périgord †; Hugues de Montlaur † as-Salih Ismail an-Nasir Dawud al-Mansur Ibrahim

Strength
About 11,000	5,000 cavalry More than 6,000 infantry

Casualties and losses
Unknown	About 7,500

The Battle of Forbie, also known as the Battle of La Forbie or the Battle of Hiribya, was fought on October 17–18, 1244 between the allied armies (drawn from the Kingdom of Jerusalem, the Crusading orders, the breakaway Ayyubids of Damascus, Homs, and Kerak) and the Egyptian army of the Ayyubid Sultan as-Salih Ayyub, reinforced with Khwarezmian mercenaries. The resulting Ayyubid victory led to the call for the Seventh Crusade and marked the collapse of Christian power in the Holy Land.

== Prelude ==
The capture of Jerusalem by the Khwarezmians in August had caused great alarm among both the Christian and the Muslim states. Al-Mansur, the Emir of Homs and an-Nasir Dawud, ruling Kerak, joined the Templars, the Hospitallers, the Teutonic Knights, the Order of Saint Lazarus, and the remaining forces of the Kingdom of Jerusalem to take the field against the Egyptian Sultanate.

The two armies met near Forbie, a small village northeast of Gaza. On the allied side, Al-Mansur was present in person, commanding about 2,000 cavalry and a detachment of troops from Damascus. The overall Christian command was given to Walter IV of Brienne, Count of Jaffa and Ascalon, although Robert of Nantes, Patriarch of Jerusalem, and Philip of Montfort, Constable of Jerusalem, were also present. The Christian army consisted of about 1,000 cavalry and 6,000 foot soldiers. The Transjordanian forces were under the command of Sunqur al-Zahiri and al-Waziri, and consisted of about 2,000 mounted Bedouin. The Egyptian army was commanded by a Mamluk officer named Rukn al-Din Baybars al-Salihi which was slightly inferior in strength to its opponents.

Al-Mansur advised the allies to fortify their camp and take the defensive, waiting for the undisciplined Khwarezmians to disperse and leave the Egyptians at a considerable disadvantage. However, Walter, to whom the overall command had been given, was unwilling to refuse battle when he had the advantage of numbers, a rarity for the Christians of Outremer. The allied dispositions were as follows: Christians on the right wing, near the coast, the Emir of Homs and the Damascenes in the center, the Bedouin on the left.

== Battle ==
Battle was joined on the morning of October 17, with the Christian knights repeatedly charging the Egyptians and fighting up and down the line. The Egyptian army held its ground. On the morning of October 18, Baybars renewed the fight and threw the Khwarezmians against the Damascene troops in the center of the allied line. The center was shattered by their furious attack, after which they turned on the allied left and cut the Bedouin to pieces. The Emir's cavalry held stubbornly, but they were nearly annihilated; Al-Mansur finally rode from the field with 280 survivors, all that remained of his troops.

Threatened by the Egyptians in front and the Khwarezmians on their flank, the Crusaders charged the Mamluks facing them and were initially successful, pushing them back and causing Baybars some concern. Their assault gradually lost momentum as the Khwarezmid tribesmen attacked the rear and the flanks of the Christian forces, which were defended by disorganized infantry. The well-armed knights fought on doggedly and it took several hours for their resistance to collapse.

Over 5,000 Crusaders died. 800 prisoners were taken, including Walter of Brienne, William of Chastelneuf, Master of the Hospital, and the Constable of Tripoli. Of the troops of the knightly orders, only 33 Templars, 27 Hospitallers, and three Teutonic Knights survived; Philip of Montfort and the Patriarch of Jerusalem Robert of Nantes also escaped to Ascalon. However, Armand de Périgord, the Master of the Temple, Hugues de Montlaur, the Marshal of the Temple, as well as the archbishop of Tyre, the bishop of Lydda and Ramla (St. George), and Bohemond, Lord of Botron and his son John, were all killed.

== Aftermath ==
Pope Innocent IV at the First Council of Lyon in 1245 called for a new Crusade, the seventh, but the Franks were never again to muster major power in the Holy Land. The Kingdom of Jerusalem suffered worst in the aftermath of Forbie. It had not been able to put so large an army into the field since the Battle of Hattin, and would never be able to undertake offensive operations again. It brought no lasting success to the Ayyubids; the Khwarezmians were defeated outside Homs by Al-Mansur Ibrahim in 1246 after falling out with the Egyptians. Baybars (Note: Not to be confused with Al-Zahir Baibars who decades later also became a sultan.) was accused of joining the Khwarezmians and was later arrested by as-Salih Ayyub and executed in prison.

While the Battle of Hattin holds great symbolic importance as having led to the fall of Jerusalem, it was Forbie that truly marked the collapse of Christian power in Outremer.

== In fiction ==
- The events of the Battle of Forbie serve as a backdrop for the novella, "The Sowers of the Thunder", by Robert E. Howard.

== Sources ==
- Barber, Malcolm (2012). The New Knighthood (10th ed.). Cambridge University Press.
- Robert Payne (1985). The Dream and the Tomb. Stein and Day/Publishers. ISBN 0-8128-6227-9.
- Joseph Drory (September 2003). "Al-Nasir Dawud: A Much Frustrated Ayyubid Prince". Al-Masaq. 15 (2): 161–187. doi:10.1080/0950311032000117467.
- Humphreys, R. Stephen (1977), From Saladin to the Mongols: The Ayyubids of Damascus, 1193–1260, Albany, New York: State University of New York Press, ISBN 0-87395-263-4
- Runciman, Steven (1987), A History of the Crusades Volume III, Cambridge University Press
