= Knights of Saint Thomas =

English military order (c. 1191–1538)

Knights of St Thomas Hospitallers of St Thomas of Canterbury at Acre
- Active: c. 1191–1538
- Allegiance: Holy See; Kingdom of England
- Type: Western Christian military order
- Locations: including: Acre, Nicosia, Kilkenny and London.
- Patron: St. Thomas Becket of Canterbury
- Engagements: The Crusades, including: Fifth Crusade; Siege of Acre (1291)

The Hospitallers of St Thomas of Canterbury at Acre, usually called the Knights of St Thomas, was a Christian military order of the Catholic Church. Membership was restricted to Englishmen.

The emblem of the order was a red cross with a white scallop in the centre and the Knights wore a white habit.

== History ==
=== Foundation ===
It was established in 1191, at Acre, after the capture of that city by Richard I of England and Philip II of France. After the capture of the city, William, Chaplain to the Dean of St. Paul's Cathedral at London, formed a small religious order, its members taking vows of poverty, chastity and obedience. The purpose of the Order was tending to the sick and wounded, and burying the Christian knights who fell in battle in the Holy Land. To that, William, as Prior of the Order, added the purpose of raising funds to ransom captives from the Muslim armies of Saladin. The success of the Order enabled it to establish a church and hospital which was dedicated to St Thomas Becket, Archbishop of Canterbury. Becket had been murdered in 1170. He was declared a martyr and canonised in 1173.

=== Property of the Hospital of St Thomas ===
Like other religious orders, the Hospital of St Thomas acquired a range of properties including St Thomas's Mill, a watermill in the Bow Back Rivers area, Stratford. Previously known as Fote's Mill, around 1245 the hospital was recorded as paying an annual rent of 9s. 6d for the use of this mill.

=== Militarisation ===
It was militarised by Peter of Roche, Bishop of Winchester, during the Sixth Crusade 1227–1229. According to Pope Gregory IX this was done thanks to the indulgence of the existing canons of the Hospital of St Thomas in Acre. Peter contributed to the defences of Jaffa and Sidon. In 1236, Pope Gregory IX granted Papal confirmation to the Order, which became known as the Knights of St Thomas Acon (Acre being Anglicised to Acon). It adopted the rule of the Teutonic Knights.

For the next 100 years, the crusaders held and defended the city of Acre. During this period, about the year 1279, as the purposes of the Knights of St Thomas shifted from that of religious hospitallers to a more military role, the position of Prior, the Order's religious head, lost its pre-eminent position to the Masters of the Order who acquired property and privileges, and created a provincial organisation in the British Isles, with its headquarters in Cheapside London and a subordinate preceptory in Kilkenny. In 1257 Alexander IV noted that the foundation did not have adequate resources. By 1279 it appealed to Edward I for funds, and their financial problems seem to have prompted the proposal to merge with the Knights Templar. However, there was opposition to this from the knights both in the Levant and England. In 1316 members successfully appealed to Edward I against a Templar takeover and also opposed an attempt takeover by the convent of Bonhommes at Ashridge

At the fall of Acre, 12 May 1291, the Master and nine knights of the Order were killed. Following the battle, the Holy Land was lost to the Saracens, the Order of St Thomas, along with the Order of Knights Templar, moved their Priory to the island of Cyprus where they erected the beautiful St. Nicholas Church at Nicosia. (The ruins of the Church are still standing and have been recently restored.) However divisions arose between the master in Cyprus and the master of the London headquarters. By 1320, with a deteriorating situation in the Levant, Henry of Bedford, the master in Cyprus, came to London and ousted the incumbent master there. When he then appointed a deputy to handle the situation in Cyprus, the brothers there resisted this move. Although this resistance was overcome, within a few years control of the organisation had once more reverted to Nicosia. However the financial situation continued to deteriorate with reports of the London premises being reported as being in ruins by 1330 and the order ceased to be a viable military organisation with nothing more being heard of the master in Nicosia after 1360.

=== The end and dissolution ===
Having abandoned a military role, they also abandoned the rule of the Teutonic Knights, adopting that of the Augustinians and carrying out charitable work and running a grammar school. Links developed with the Mercers livery company at this time – Becket's father, Gilbert had been a mercer. The latter became their patrons, holding meetings there and using the chapel for prayers. The Order was dissolved in 1538, along with other monastic orders in England, by Henry VIII.

=== The Worshipful Mercers' Company of London ===
After the dissolution of the Order, the King offered the hospital and chapel for sale. It was purchased by the Mercers. But the buildings were destroyed in the Great Fire of London in 1666. The Mercers Company is the premier livery company of London, ranking first in the order of precedence of the "Great Twelve City Livery Companies".

The second hall, opened in 1676, was destroyed in 1941 during the Blitz. The present-day Mercer's Hall and Chapel, opened in 1958, are built on the site. It incorporates some of the fixtures, 17th-century woodwork and Victorian stained glass from the second hall. All that remains of the original Chapel is the recumbent statue of Christ which lies at the entrance to the Mercer's Chapel. The Worshipful Company of Mercers is one of the few London Livery Companies to have its own private chapel.

== Bibliography ==
- Forey, Alan J. The Military Order of St Thomas of Acre, "English Historical Review", 92 (1977), pp. 481–503.
- Vincent, N. Peter des Roches: An Alien in English Politics, 1205–1238, Cambridge, 1996.
- Watney, J. Some Account of the Hospital of St. Thomas of Acon, in the Cheap, London, and of the Plate of the Mercers' Company, London, 1892.
- King, E. J. Official History of the British Order of the Hospital of St. John of Jerusalem, pg. 32 (1934).
- Demurger, Alain A Brief History of Religious Military Orders – Hospitallers, Templars, Teutonic..., Tiralet (1997).
- Bartlett, W. B. God Wills It! – An Illustrated History of the Crusades, Gloucestershire (1999).
- Benvenisti, Meron The Crusaders in the Holy Land, New York (1970).
- Cross, Peter The Knight in Medieval England, 1000–1400, Gloucestershire (1993).
- Payne, Robert The Dream and the Tomb: A History of the Crusades, New York (1984).
- Riley-Smith, Jonathan The Atlas of the Crusades, New York (1991), pp. 106–107.
- Tyerman, Christopher The Invention of the Crusades, Toronto (1998).
- Upton-Ward, J. M. A translation of The Rule of the Templars, Suffolk (1992).
- Walsh, Michael Warriors of the Lord: The Military Orders of Christendom, Cambridge (2003), pg. 203.

== See also ==
- Catholic Church in England and Wales
