= Voulaines-les-Templiers =

- Commune
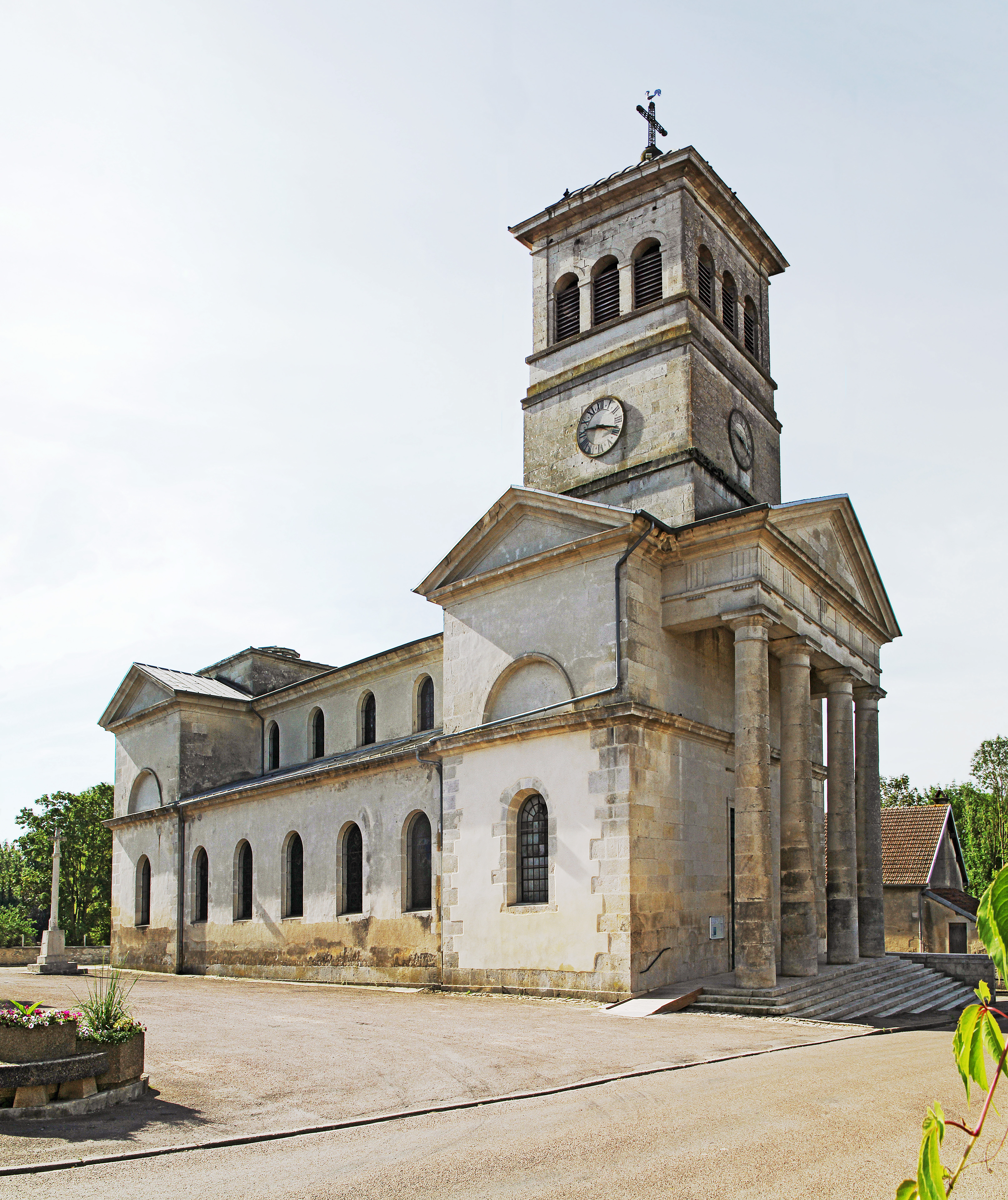
- Church

- Coat of arms
- Location of Voulaines-les-Templiers
- Location within France Location within Bourgogne-Franche-Comté
- Coordinates: 47°49′12″N 4°46′45″E
- Country: France
- Region: Bourgogne-Franche-Comté
- Department: Côte-d'Or
- Arrondissement: Montbard
- Canton: Châtillon-sur-Seine
- Intercommunality: Pays Châtillonnais

Government
  - Mayor (2020–2026): Marcel Vernevaut
- Area^{1}: 23.13 km^{2} (8.93 sq mi)
- Highest elevation: 398 m (1,306 ft)
- Lowest elevation: 251 m (823 ft)
- Population (2023): 270
  - Density: 12/km^{2} (30/sq mi)
- Time zone: UTC+01:00 (CET)
  - Summer (DST): UTC+02:00 (CEST)
- INSEE/Postal code: 21717 /21290
- ^{1} French Land Register data, which excludes lakes, ponds, glaciers > 1 km^{2} (0.386 sq mi or 247 acres) and river estuaries.

Voulaines-les-Templiers (French pronunciation: [vulɛn le tɑ̃plije]) is a commune in the Côte-d'Or department in eastern France, Europe.

== Population ==
Historical population
Year	Pop.	±% p.a.
1968	415	—
1975	380	−1.25%
1982	364	−0.61%
1990	383	+0.64%
1999	386	+0.09%
2007	327	−2.05%
2012	298	−1.84%
2017	288	−0.68%
2023	270	−1.07%
Source: INSEE

== See also ==
- Communes of the Côte-d'Or department
