= Siege of Acre (1291) =

Part of the Crusades

- Part of the Crusades
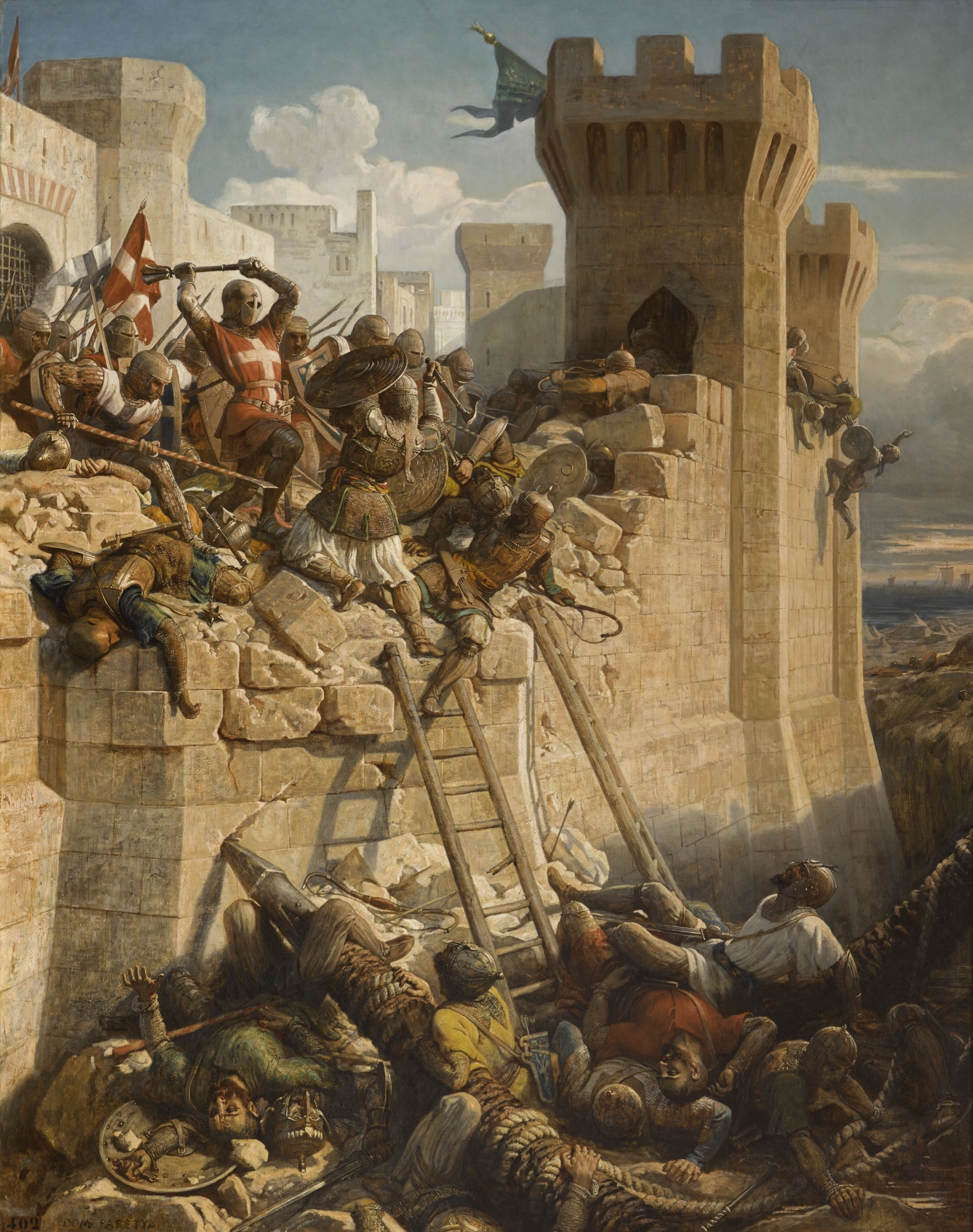
- Matthieu de Clermont défend Ptolémaïs en 1291, by Dominique Papety (1815–49) at Salles des Croisades in Versailles
Date	4 April – 18 May 1291
Location	Acre, Kingdom of Jerusalem 32°56′N 35°05′E
Result	Mamluk victory; Decline of Crusader states
Territorial changes	Successful recapture of Acre by the Muslims

Belligerents
Mamluk Sultanate: Ayyubid remnant emirate of Hama	Kingdom of Jerusalem (in union with Cyprus); Knights Templar; Knights Hospitaller; Teutonic Order; Order of St. Thomas; Order of St. Lazarus

Commanders and leaders
Al-Ashraf Khalil; Hussam ad-Din Lajin; Al-Muzaffar III Mahmud; Baybars al-Mansuri; Siraj al-Din Dhabyan; Sayf al-Din Bilban; Ibn Taymiyyah	Henry II, King of Jerusalem and Cyprus; Amalric of Tyre; Guillaume de Beaujeu †; Thibaud Gaudin; Pierre de Severy †; Jean de Villiers; Matthew of Clermont †; Konrad von Feuchtwangen; Otto de Grandson; Jean de Grailly; (DOW)

Strength
160,000 foot soldiers 66,000 horsemen	Acre: 15,000; Cyprus: 700

Casualties and losses
Unknown	Unknown

The siege of Acre (also called the fall of Acre) took place in 1291 and resulted in the Crusaders' losing control of Acre to the Mamluk Sultanate of Egypt. It is considered one of the most important battles of the period. Although the crusading movement continued for several more centuries, the capture of the city marked the end of further crusades to the Levant. When Acre fell, the Crusaders lost their last major stronghold of the Crusader Kingdom of Jerusalem.

== Background ==
In 1187, Saladin conquered much of the Kingdom of Jerusalem (also called the Latin Kingdom), including Acre and Jerusalem, after winning the Battle of Hattin and inflicting heavy losses on the Crusaders. The Third Crusade was launched in response; the Crusaders besieged and eventually recaptured Acre in 1191. Acre became the capital of the Kingdom of Jerusalem. The religious orders made their headquarters in and around the city, and from there made crucial military and diplomatic decisions. For example, when the Mongols arrived from the East in the mid-13th century, the Christians saw them as potential allies.

In 1250, the Mamluk Sultanate arose in Egypt; it was a more dangerous enemy than the Ayyubids. The Mamluks fielded heavy cavalry – a match for the Crusader knights – and were much more hostile. The Crusaders initially attempted to maintain a cautious neutrality with the Mamluks. In 1260, the Barons of Acre granted the Mamluks safe passage through the Latin Kingdom en route to fighting the Mongols; the Mamluks subsequently won the pivotal Battle of Ain Jalut in Galilee against the Mongols. This was an example of atypically cordial relations between the Christians and the Mamluks.

However, as early as 1261, after the Battle of Ain Jalut, Sultan Baibars led the Mamluks against the Crusaders. Baibars captured Caesarea, Haifa, and Arsuf in 1265, all the important Crusader holdings in Galilee the following year, and then Antioch in 1268.

European states launched a number of minor Crusading expeditions to reinforce the Crusader states, including the abortive Crusade of Louis IX of France to Tunis in 1270, and the minor Ninth Crusade of Prince Edward (later King Edward I) of England in 1271–1272. The expeditions failed to provide the required relief; they were too small, too short-lived, and the interests of the participants were too diverse.

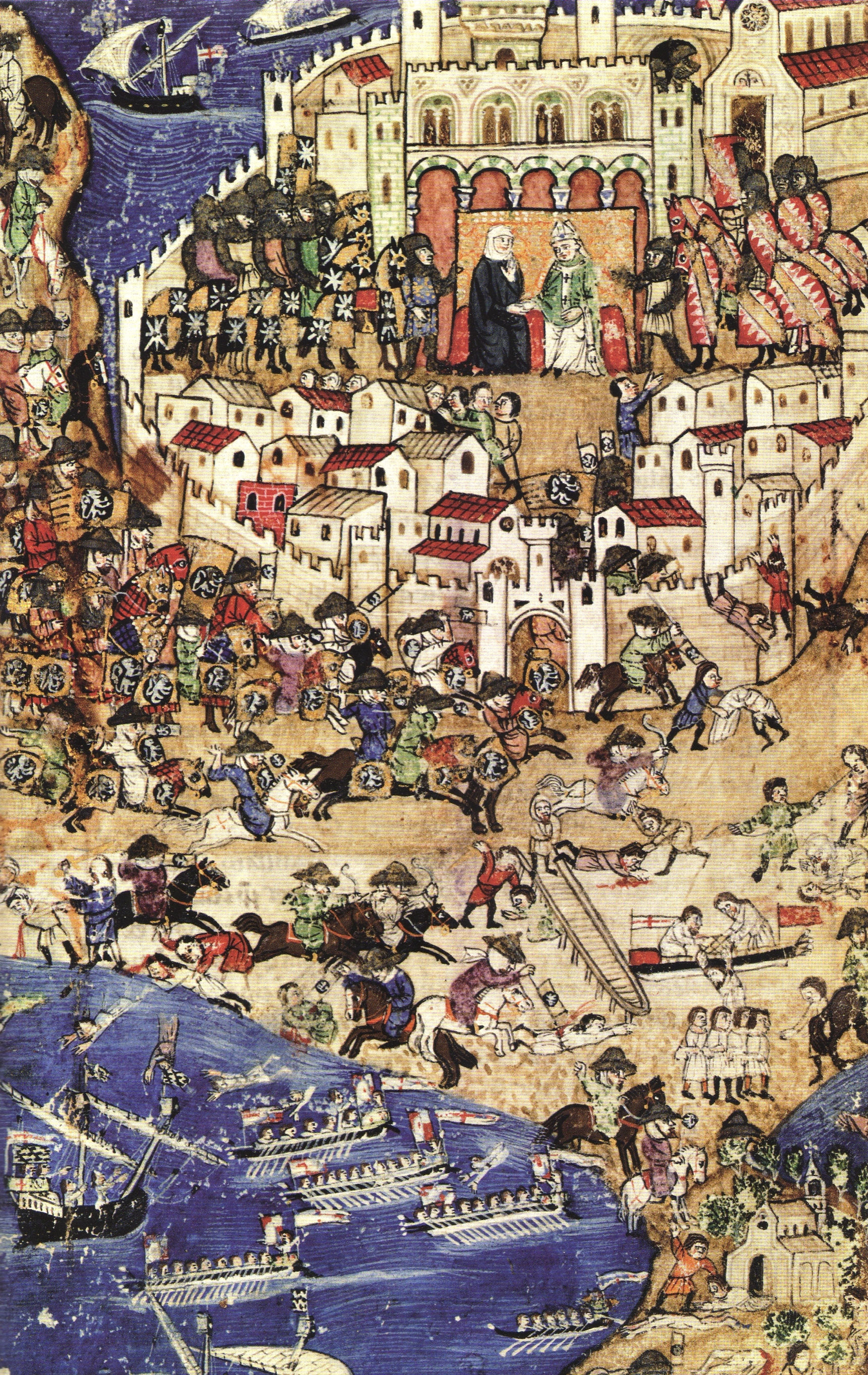
The fall of Tripoli in 1289 triggered frantic preparations to save Acre.

More seriously, no major reinforcing Crusade was forthcoming. Pope Gregory X was unable to rally support for another great Crusade. Papal advisors blamed the lack of enthusiasm to the laziness and vice of the European nobility and to clerical corruption. A more fundamental reason seems to have been the debasement of the Crusading ideal; Gregory X's predecessors had used Crusades to raise armies against the Papacy's European enemies, such as the Albigensian Crusade declared by Innocent III against the Cathars & a crusade against the Hohenstaufen Emperor Frederick II declared by Innocent IV.

The Crusader states continued to deteriorate from continuing attacks and political instability. In 1276, the unpopular "King of Jerusalem" Hugh III moved his court to Cyprus. Under Sultan Al-Mansur Qalawun, the Mamluks captured Lattakia in 1278, and conquered the County of Tripoli in 1289. Qalawun concluded a ten-year truce with the Kingdom of Jerusalem in 1284.

Following the fall of Tripoli, King Henry II, son of Hugh III, sent seneschal Jean de Grailly to warn European monarchs of the critical situation in the Levant. Pope Nicholas IV supported Jean by writing letters urging European potentates to act. However, the Sicilian question overshadowed calls for a new Crusade, and Edward I of England was too entangled by troubles at home.

Decades of communications between the Europeans and the Mongols failed to secure a meaningful Franco-Mongol alliance.

=== Pretext for attack ===
One Arab account claims that an affair between a rich young wife of the city and a Mussulman was discovered by the husband:

gathers together some friends goes out from Ptolemais [...] and immolates them both to his injured honour. Some Mussulmans are drawn to the spot, the Christians come up in still greater numbers, the quarrel becomes angry and general and every Mussulman is massacred.

— The History of the Crusades, Vol. 3, p. 73, Michaud and Robson

The Crusaders feared that Qalawun would use this as a pretext to resume the war, and petitioned the pontiff for reinforcements. According to Michaud, 25 Venetian galleys carrying 1600 men "levied in haste in Italy" were sent. Other sources claim 20 galleys of peasants and unemployed townfolks from Tuscany and Lombardy, led by Nicholas Tiepolo, the son of Doge Lorenzo Tiepolo, who was assisted by the returning Jean de Grailly and Roux of Sully. These were joined by five galleys from King James II of Aragon who wished to help despite his conflict with the Pope and Venice.

The Italian reinforcements were ill-disciplined and without regular pay; they pillaged indiscriminately from both Muslims and Christians before setting out from Acre. According to Runciman they attacked and killed some Muslim merchants around Acre in August 1290, although in Michaud's account they instead pillaged and massacred towns and villages. Qalawun demanded the extradition of the Christian perpetrators. On the suggestion of Guillaume de Beaujeu, the Grand Master of the Knights Templar, the Council of Acre debated the issue; the Sultan's demand was rejected, with the Crusaders claiming that the murdered Muslims had been responsible for their own deaths.

== Siege ==
=== Prelude to the battle ===
Sultan Qalawun dissolved the truce with Acre, and the Mamluks began mobilizing by October 1290. Qalawun died in December and was succeeded by his son, Al-Ashraf Khalil (sometimes spelled Chalil). Guillaume de Beaujeu received a message from Khalil, which stated the latter's intention to attack Acre and to refuse peace overtures. Nonetheless, the Crusaders dispatched a peace delegation, led by Sir Philip Mainebeuf, to Cairo; the delegation was imprisoned. Khalil set out from Cairo in March 1291.

The assembled Mamluk army greatly outnumbered the Crusaders. Khalil called upon Syria to reinforce his Egyptian army; he was answered by contingents from Damascus (led by Lajin), Hama (led by al-Muzaffar Taqai ad-Din), Tripoli (led by Bilban) and al-Karak (led by Baibars al-Dewadar.) A significant portion of the troops were volunteers. The army included a substantial artillery train drawn from fortresses across the Mamluk empire. Hama sent the enormous catapult "The Victorious" (المنصورى). (Note: This may have been a reference to the Sultan, who was Khalil Al-Mansuri.) Another large catapult was "The Furious" (الغاضبة). There were also lighter mangonels called "the Black Bulls" (الثيران السوداء).

Notable historians in the Mamluks' ranks included Baybars al-Dewadar, and Abulfeda in the Haman contingent.

The Crusaders' appeals for aid met with little success. England sent a few knights, including Otto de Grandson of Savoy. The only noteworthy reinforcements came from Henry II of Cyprus, who fortified the walls and sent troops led by his brother Amalric, Lord of Tyre. Burchard von Schwanden suddenly resigned as Grand Master of the Teutonic Order and left Acre for Europe; he was succeeded by Konrad von Feuchtwangen. The only major contingent to leave were the Genoese, who concluded a separate treaty with Khalil. Many women and children were evacuated from Acre to Cyprus in March.

Acre was defended by an inner and outer wall, with a total of twelve towers built by European kings and rich pilgrims.

=== Siege begins ===
Map of Acre in 1291

Sultan Khalil and the Egyptian army arrived at Acre on 6 April 1291, with the Syrian contingents arriving two days later with siege engines. The Mamluk encampment spanned from one coast to the other about two kilometers from the city walls. The red dihliz – the Sultan's personal tent and headquarters – was on a small hill west of the Legate's Tower. There was little fighting during the first eight days as the besiegers established their camp. From days nine to eleven the Mamluks pushed forward barricades and wicker screens until they reached the fosse before the outer wall; Carabohas, rapid-fire siege engines, were brought up. The besiegers began mining and bombarding the walls. Acre's gates remained open – but heavily defended – as sally ports.

The Crusaders launched multiple attacks on the Mamluk camp. An amphibious assault on the Hamans – stationed on the northernmost section of the line by the sea – was successful although the Crusaders suffered heavy casualties. In another raid, three hundred Templars, led by Jean de Grailly and Otto de Grandson, rode out under moonlight to attack Haman artillery with Greek fire; while the artillery was not destroyed, the Templar engaged over 1000 Mamluks and returned with trophies and captured supplies. Khalil punished some subordinates for the humiliation caused by the Templar sorties. In general, Crusader attacks failed to disrupt Mamluk preparations for a direct assault on the walls.

Henry II of Cyprus arrived on 4 May with reinforcements of 700 troops aboard 40 ships. The king's arrival temporarily buoyed morale, but an inspection of the city convinced Henry II to attempt a negotiated settlement; the Crusaders believed that tribute could buy a truce. On 17 May, William of Villiers, a knight, and William of Caffran, of Guillaume de Beaujeu's household, were sent to negotiate with the Sultan. The negotiations were unsuccessful. The Crusaders refused to surrender, and appealed to Khalil to lift the siege and accept peace for the sake of the civilian inhabitants. Khalil remained intent on conquering the city, perhaps encouraged by the popularity of the cause among his troops; his counteroffer to allow the defenders to surrender and leave with their lives and property was rejected. Toward the end of the meeting, a Crusader artillery stone landed near the dihliz; the Sultan was greatly angered and ordered a full assault the following day. The messengers returned to the city unharmed.

The Mamluk assault was preceded by weeks of preparation. By 18 May, multiple towers and parts of the wall were collapsed by undermining, and sections of the fosse filled in. The collapse of the Tower of the King was particularly demoralizing among the defenders, and the evacuation of women and children accelerated.

=== Storming the city ===
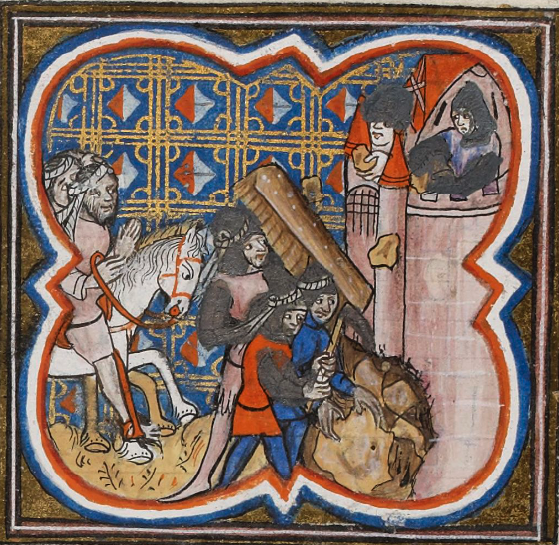
14th-century illustration of the siege in the Grandes Chroniques de France, depicting the Mamluks undermining the city walls

The Mamluk army assembled before dawn on 18 May and attacked the entire length of the wall to the sound of trumpets and drums carried on 300 camels. The Mamluks poured through the breaches; by 9 a.m. the outcome seems to have been beyond doubt. The Mamluks captured the Accursed Tower on the inner wall and forced the Crusaders to retreat to the Gate of St. Anthony. Guillaume de Beaujeu was mortally wounded defending the Gate of St. Anthony. (Note: He was buried in the Templar fortress before the fall of the city.) On the Montmusard walls, the Lazarists remained while the Templars and Hospitallers made a failed attempt to retake the Accursed Tower. The redeployment allowed the Hamans to break through the Montmusard walls and kill the Lazarists. The Mamluks gained more penetrations as the Crusaders abandoned the walls.

The Mamluks pushed into the city, looting and massacring anyone they encountered. (Note: According to Ludolph of Suchem (which seems exaggerated): "In Acre and the other places nearly a hundred and six thousand men were slain or taken, and more than two hundred thousand escaped from thence. Of the Saracens more than three hundred thousand were slain, as is well known even to this day.") Organized Crusader resistance collapsed, and the retreat to the harbour and the ships was chaotic; wealthy refugees offered exorbitant sums for safe passage. (Note: Roger de Flor, a mercenary commander and Knight Templar, made his fortune by selling passage to fleeing nobles and blackmailing refugees.) (Note: "More than five hundred most noble ladies and maidens, the daughters of kings and princes, came down to the seashore, when the city was about to fall, carrying with them all their jewels and ornaments of gold and precious stones, of priceless value, in their bosoms, and cried aloud, whether there were any sailor there who would take all their jewels and take whichever of them he chose to wife, if only he would take them, even naked, to some safe land or island") Henry II and Jean de Villiers, Grand Master of the Knights Hospitaller, were among those evacuated. The evacuation was made more difficult by the poor weather.

=== Acre falls ===
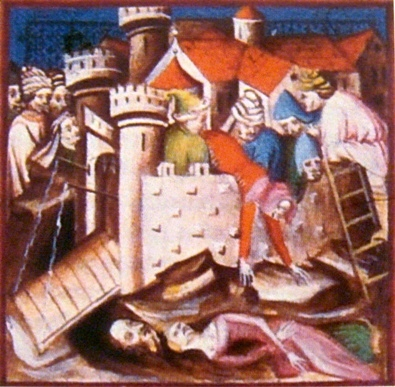
The city of Acre fell in 1291, and its Latin Christian population was killed or enslaved.

By the night of 18 May, Acre was in Mamluk hands, except for the seaside Templar fortress at the western tip of the city. The fortress contained four towers, and within were remnants of the Templar, Hospitallers, and Teutonic Knights, and thousands of civilians. The fortress held out for ten more days, during which Matthew of Clermont, a Hospitaller marshal, was killed. Templar Thibaud Gaudin and a few others left the fortress under the cover of darkness, taking the Templar treasury with them to Sidon. (Note: Thibaud Gaudin was elected as Grand Master of the Knights Templar at Sidon.) On 20 May, the tower held by the Templars, led by Peter de Severy, asked for amnesty. Sultan Khalil agreed to allow the woman and children to leave the city. The gates were opened and 400 horseman entered the complex, but they immediately attacked the women and children. Peter de Severy refused to accept this and ordered the gates to be closed, trapping the horsemen. A battle ensued, but this time the Christians had the advantage. Of the 400 horsemen who entered the fortress, only a handful escaped. The others were either killed or beheaded. The battles were fierce and relentless. When the fighting stopped, Peter de Severy received another letter from the Sultan. In it, he stated that his men deserved their deaths for their undisciplined behavior. Furthermore, he asked the marshal to leave his fortress to discuss terms. It was a lie. Trying to spare the civilian population under his protection, Peter de Severy opened the gates and stepped forward with a delegation of Knights Templar. Before they could reach the enemy's encampments they were killed by the Sultan's troops.

Further offers of amnesty were rejected by the Crusaders. On 28 May, the final tower surrendered; Mamluk mines were prepared to destroy the tower making further resistance useless. The tower collapsed after prisoners and booty had been removed; according to Mamluk accounts, a few sightseers and looters were killed. (Note: According to Ludolph of Suchem, the Templars deliberately caused the collapse by undermining the walls.)

News of the Mamluk victory caused celebrations in Damascus and Cairo. In Damascus, Khalil entered the city with chained Crusader prisoners and captured Crusader standards – carried upside-down in defeat. The Sultan returned to Cairo with the gate of the Church of Saint Andrew from Acre, which was used to construct a mosque and released Philip Mainebeuf's delegation. Furthermore, celebrations were described as: “The entire city had been decorated, and sheets of satin had been laid along his triumphal path through the city leading to the palace of the governor. The regal sultan was proceeded by 280 fettered prisoners. One bore a reversed Frankish banner; another carried a banner and spear from which the hair of slain comrades was suspended. Al-Ashraf was greeted by the whole population of Damascus and the surrounding countryside lining the route, ulama [legal scholars], mosque officials, Sufi sheiks, Christians and Jews, all holding candles even though the parade took place before noon.”

== Aftermath ==
The fall of Acre signaled the end of the Jerusalem crusades. No effective crusade was raised to recapture the Holy Land afterwards, though talk of further crusades was common enough. By 1291, other ideals had captured the interest and enthusiasm of the monarchs and nobility of Europe and even strenuous papal efforts to raise expeditions to retake the Holy Land met with little response.

The Latin Kingdom continued to exist, theoretically, on the island of Cyprus. There the Latin kings planned to recapture the mainland, but in vain. Money, men, and the will to do the task were all lacking. One last effort was made by King Peter I in 1365, when he successfully landed in Egypt and sacked Alexandria. Once the city was taken, however, the Crusaders returned to Cyprus. As a crusade, the episode was futile, and this and further coastal raids over the following decades in 1410–11 led to destructive counter-raids Mamluk campaigns against Cyprus (1424–1426) by the Mamluk Sultanate; in 1426 Cyprus was forced into Mamluk vassalship with a hefty yearly tribute.

The 14th century witnessed other organized campaigns such as the Crusades of Nicopolis and Varna, but these enterprises differed in many ways from the 11th-13th-century expeditions which are properly called Crusades. The crusades of the 14th century aimed not at the recapture of Jerusalem and the Christian shrines of the Holy Land, but rather at checking the advance of the Ottoman Empire into Europe. While many of the crusaders in these 14th-century undertakings looked upon the defeat of the Ottomans as a preliminary to the ultimate recapture of the Holy Land, none of the later crusades attempted any direct attack upon Palestine or Syria.

== Historiography ==
Two short works dedicated to the siege were produced by contemporaries on the basis of eyewitness accounts: the Hystoria de desolacione of Thaddeus of Naples and the anonymous Excidium Acconis. These survive in four and six manuscripts, respectively. The Gestes des Chiprois, written a generation later and surviving in a single manuscript, is the other main source from the crusaders' perspective. The Gestes des Chiprois is the only surviving eyewitness account and does not suffer the partial flaws of the Excidium Acconis.
