= List of English novelists =

This is a list of novelists from England writing for adults and young adults. Please add only one novel title or comment on fiction per name. Other genres appear in other lists and on subject's page. References appear on the individual pages.

== A ==
- Edwin Abbott Abbott (1838–1926), Flatland
- Kia Abdullah (born 1982)
- Joe Abercrombie (born 1974), fantasy
- Paul Ableman (1927–2006)
- J. R. Ackerley (1896–1967)
- Peter Ackroyd (born 1949)
- Hazel Adair (1900–1990)
- Paul Adam (born 1958)
- Ruth Adam (1907–1977)
- Charles Warren Adams (1833–1903), The Notting Hill Mystery
- Douglas Adams (1952–2001), The Hitchhiker's Guide to the Galaxy
- Francis Adams (1862–1893)
- Poppy Adams (living)
- Richard Adams (1920–2016), Watership Down
- Jean Adamson (1928–2024), Topsy and Tim
- Arthur St. John Adcock (1864–1930)
- Grace Aguilar (1816–1847)
- Robert Aickman (1914–1981)
- Joan Aiken (1924–2004), The Wolves of Willoughby Chase
- Lucy Aikin (1781–1864)
- Ruth Ainsworth (1908–1984), children's fiction
- William Harrison Ainsworth (1805–1882), Rookwood
- Catherine Aird (1930–2024)
- Vivien Alcock (1924–2003), children's fiction
- Naomi Alderman (born 1974), The Power
- Richard Aldington (1892–1962), Death of a Hero
- Brian Aldiss (1925–2017), science fiction
- Miriam Alexander (1879–?)
- Monica Ali (born 1967)
- Mabel Esther Allan (1915–1998), children's school stories
- Walter Allen (1911–1995)
- Margery Allingham (1904–1966), The Crime at Black Dudley
- E. M. Almedingen (1898–1971)
- David Almond (born 1951), young adult novels
- Kingsley Amis (1922–1995), Lucky Jim
- Martin Amis (1949–2023), Dead Babies
- Valerie Anand (1937–2007), historical fiction
- Julie Andrews (born 1935)
- Sam Angus (born 1967), children's historical novels
- Charlotte Anley (1796–1893), didactic novelist
- Evelyn Anthony (1926–2018)
- Lisa Appignanesi (born 1946)
- Jeffrey Archer (1940-2026)
- Philip Ardagh (born 1961)
- Reginald Arkell (1882–1959)
- Michael Arlen (1895–1956)
- Simon Armitage (born 1963)
- Annie Armitt (1850–1933)
- Martin Armstrong (1882–1974)
- Richard Armstrong (1903–1986), Sea Change
- Elizabeth von Arnim (1866–1941), Elizabeth and Her German Garden
- Edwin Lester Arnold (1857–1935)
- Elizabeth Arnold (born 1944), children's novels
- William Delafield Arnold (1828–1859)
- Pat Arrowsmith (1930–2023)
- Joseph Ashby-Sterry (1836 or 1838–1917)
- Daisy Ashford (1881–1972), The Young Visiters (sic, written aged nine)
- Lindsay Ashford (born 1959)
- Bernard Ashley (born 1935), children's fiction
- Carl Ashmore (born 1968), children's novels
- Francis Leslie Ashton (1904–1994)
- Judy Astley (living)
- Edwin Atherstone (1788–1872)
- Blanche Atkinson (1847–1911)
- Kate Atkinson (born 1951)
- M. E. Atkinson (1899–1974), children's fiction
- Penelope Aubin (c. 1679 – c. 1731)
- Steve Augarde (born 1950), children's fiction
- Jane Austen (1775–1817), Pride and Prejudice
- Gillian Avery (1926–2016), children's fiction
- Tash Aw (born 1973)

== B ==
=== Ba–Bg ===
- Robert Bage (1728–1801)
- Desmond Bagley (1923–1983), horror novels
- Beryl Bainbridge (1932–2010), The Bottle Factory Outing
- John Bainbridge (born 1953)
- Cherith Baldry (born 1947), fantasy
- J. G. Ballard (1930–2009), Crash
- Isabella Banks (1821–1897), The Manchester Man
- Lynne Reid Banks (1929–2024), The L-Shaped Room
- Margaret Barber (Michael Fairless, 1869–1901), The Roadmender
- Ros Barber (born 1964)
- Sabine Baring-Gould (1834–1924)
- Nicola Barker (born 1966)
- Nugent Barker (1888–1955), ghost stories
- Pat Barker (born 1943), Regeneration Trilogy
- Frances Catherine Barnard (1796–1869)
- Joshua Barnes (1654–1712)
- Julian Barnes (born 1946), England, England
- Alexander Baron (1917–1999)
- Amelia Edith Huddleston Barr (1831–1919)
- Pat Barr (1934–2018)
- Mark Barrowcliffe (born 1964)
- Stan Barstow (1928–2011), A Kind of Loving
- H. E. Bates (1905–1974), The Darling Buds of May
- Nina Bawden (1925–2012), Carrie's War
- Matthew Baylis (born 1971)
- Ada Ellen Bayly (1857–1903)
- William Beckford (1760–1844), Vathek
- Lillian Beckwith (1916–2004)
- Max Beerbohm (1872–1956), Zuleika Dobson
- Aphra Behn (1640–1689)
- John Hay Beith (Ian Hay, 1876–1952)
- Rosalind Belben (born 1941), Hound Music
- Nona Bellairs (1824–1897)
- Elizabeth Benger (1775–1827)
- Arnold Bennett (1867–1931), Anna of the Five Towns
- Geoffrey Bennett (1909–1983)
- E. F. Benson (1867–1940), Mapp and Lucia series
- Phyllis Bentley (1894–1977)
- Ursula Bentley (1945–2004)
- Kenneth Benton (1909–1999), spy fiction
- J. D. Beresford (1873–1947), science fiction
- John Berger (1926–2017), G.
- Anthony Berkeley (1893–1971), mystery novels (The Poisoned Chocolates Case)
- Louis de Bernières (born 1954), Captain Corelli's Mandolin
- Walter Besant (1836–1901), All Sorts and Conditions of Men
- Matilda Betham-Edwards (1836–1919)
- Tom Bevan (1868–1938), novels for boys

=== Bh–Bz ===
- Mark Billingham (born 1961), crime novels
- Anne Billson (born 1954)
- Alan Bilton (born 1969)
- Carol Birch (born 1951)
- Clementina Black (1853–1923)
- Robert Black (1829–1915)
- John Blackburn (1923–1993), thrillers
- Julia Blackburn (born 1948)
- R. D. Blackmore (1821–1900), Lorna Doone
- Algernon Blackwood (1869–1951), especially ghost stories
- Nicholas Blincoe (born 1965), Manchester Slingback
- Eliot Bliss (1903–1990), Bildungsromane
- Elizabeth Blower (c. 1757/63 – post-1816)
- Denis Bond (born 1952), children's fiction
- Elizabeth Bonhôte (1744–1818), Bungay Castle
- Stephen Booth (born 1952), crime fiction
- George Borrow (1803–1881), The Romany Rye
- Alain de Botton (born 1969)
- Marjorie Boulton (1924–2017), in both English and Esperanto.
- Henrietta Maria Bowdler (1750–1830)
- Marjorie Bowen (1885–1952)
- Tim Bowler (born 1953), River Boy
- William Boyd (born 1952), Any Human Heart
- Paula Brackston (living), The Witch's Daughter
- Jason Bradbury (born 1969), children's fiction
- Malcolm Bradbury (1932–2000), The History Man
- Mary Elizabeth Braddon (1837–1915), Lady Audley's Secret
- Barbara Taylor Bradford (1933–2024), A Woman of Substance
- Edward Bradley (1827–1889), The Adventures of Mr. Verdant Green
- John Braine (1922–1986), Room at the Top
- Matthew Branton (born 1968)
- Paula Brackston (living), historical fantasy
- Anna Eliza Bray (1790–1883), historical novels
- Wallace Breem (1926–1990), Eagle in the Snow
- Frederick Sadleir Brereton (1872–1957), historical fiction for children
- Simon Brett (born 1945), crime fiction
- Victor Bridges (1878–1972), detective fiction
- Sophia Briggs (1821–1894)
- Henry Brinton (1901–1977), thrillers
- Joanna Briscoe (born 1963)
- Sophia Briscoe (fl. 1770s)
- Vera Brittain (1893–1970)
- Lionel Britton (1887–1971)
- Frances Brody (fl. 2026), Kate Shackleton series
- Vincent Brome (1910–2004)
- Anne Brontë (1820–1849), The Tenant of Wildfell Hall.
- Charlotte Brontë (1816–1855), Jane Eyre.
- Emily Brontë (1818–1848), Wuthering Heights
- Frances Brooke (1724–1789)
- Anita Brookner (1928–2016), Hotel du Lac
- Shirley Brooks (1816–1874)
- Brigid Brophy (1929–1995)
- D. K. Broster (1877–1950), historical novels
- Tom Brown (1662–1704)
- Anthony Buckeridge (1912–2004), Jennings and Derbyshire novels
- Edward Bulwer-Lytton (1803–1873), The Last Days of Pompeii
- John Bunyan (1628–1688), The Pilgrim's Progress
- Anthony Burgess (1917–1993), A Clockwork Orange
- Frances Hodgson Burnett (1849–1924), The Secret Garden
- Caroline Burney (fl. early 19th century, pseudonym)
- Frances Burney (1752–1840), Evelina
- Sarah Burney (1772–1844)
- Hester Burton (1913–2000), historical fiction
- Jessie Burton (born 1982), historical and children's novels
- Richard Francis Burton (1821–1890)
- Charlotte Bury (1775–1861)
- Samuel Butler (1835–1902), Erewhon
- Colin Butts (born 1964)
- A. S. Byatt (1936–2023), Possession

== C ==
- Hall Caine (1853–1931), romantic novels
- Mona Caird (1854–1932)
- Joanna Cannan (1896–1961), detective and children's novels
- Rosa Nouchette Carey (1840–1909)
- J. L. Carr (1912–1994), A Month in the Country
- Lewis Carroll (1832–1898), Alice's Adventures in Wonderland
- Angela Carter (1940–1992), magical realism
- Dean Vincent Carter (born 1976), horror novels
- Barbara Cartland (1901–2000), romance novels
- Rosa Nouchette Carey (1840–1909), children's fiction
- Georgiana Cavendish, Duchess of Devonshire (1757–1806)
- Mark Chadbourn (born 1960), science fiction
- Elizabeth Chadwick (born 1957), historical fiction
- Somerset de Chair (1911–1995)
- Aidan Chambers (1934–2025), Postcards from No Man's Land
- Leslie Charteris (1907–1993), devised "The Saint"
- Bruce Chatwin (1940–1989)
- Christine Chaundler (1887–1972), children's fiction
- Mavis Cheek (1948–2023)
- G. K. Chesterton (1874–1936)
- William Rufus Chetwood (died 1766)
- Lee Child (born 1954), Jack Reacher
- Mary Cholmondeley (1859–1925), Red Pottage
- Catherine Christian (1901–1985), children's novels
- Agatha Christie (1890–1976), The Mysterious Affair at Styles
- Alys Clare (Elizabeth Harris, born 1944), historical whodunnits
- Emily Clark (fl. 1798–1833)
- Arthur C. Clarke (1917–2008)
- Mrs. Henry Clarke (1853–1908), historical fiction
- Susanna Clarke (born 1959), Jonathan Strange & Mr Norrell
- Brian Cleeve (1921–2003)
- Lucy Clifford (1846–1929)
- Elizabeth Cobbold (1765–1824)
- Richard Cobbold (1797–1877)
- Henry Cockton (1807–1852)
- Jonathan Coe (born 1961)
- Margaret Cole (1893–1980), detective stories
- Christabel Rose Coleridge (1843–1921)
- Jackie Collins (1937–2015), romances
- Mortimer Collins (1827–1876)
- Wilkie Collins (1824–1889), The Moonstone
- Ivy Compton-Burnett (1884–1969)
- Joseph Conrad (1857–1924), Lord Jim
- Storm Constantine (1956–2021), science fiction
- Hugh Conway (pseudonym of Frederick John Fargus, 1847–1885)
- Judith Cook (1933–2004) historical novels
- Catherine Cookson (1906–1998), The Cinder Path
- William Cooper (1910–2002)
- Marie Corelli (1855–1924)
- Bernard Cornwell (born 1944), Sharpe novels
- Dudley Costello (1803–1865)
- Dilly Court (born 1940) historical sagas
- Dorothy Cowlin (1911–2010)
- Anthony Berkeley Cox (Francis Iles, 1893–1971), The Poisoned Chocolates Case
- Josephine Cox (1938–2020)
- Amanda Craig (born 1959), A Vicious Circle
- Dinah Craik (1826–1887), The Little Lame Prince and his Travelling Cloak
- Helen Cresswell (1934–2005), Lizzie Dripping
- Adam Croft (living), crime fiction
- Andy Croft (born 1956), young adult novels
- Andrew Crofts (born 1953), The Little Hero
- Bithia Mary Croker (c. 1848–1920)
- Richmal Crompton (1890–1969), Just William series
- Camilla Dufour Crosland (1812–1895)
- Catherine Crowe (1803–1876)
- Aleister Crowley (1875–1947)
- Andrew Crumey (born 1961)
- J. A. Cuddon (1928–1996)
- Annie Hall Cudlip (1838–1918)
- Rachel Cusk (born 1967), Outline
- Catherine Cuthbertson (c. 1775–1842)

== D ==
- Charlotte Dacre (1782–1841)
- Roald Dahl (1916–1990), children's fiction
- Celia Dale (1912–2011)
- Penny Dale (born 1954)
- Clemence Dane (1888–1965)
- Denise Danks (living)
- F. J. Harvey Darton (1878–1936)
- Emma Darwin (born 1964)
- Selina Davenport (1779–1859)
- Lionel Davidson (1922–2009)
- Caitlin Davies (born 1964)
- Hugh Sykes Davies (1909–1984)
- Peter Ho Davies (born 1966)
- Lindsey Davis (born 1949)
- Coningsby Dawson (1883–1959)
- Jennifer Dawson (1929–2000)
- William James Dawson (1854–1928)
- Martin Day (born 1968)
- William De Morgan (1839–1917)
- Thomas de Quincey (1785–1859), Confessions of an English Opium-Eater
- Walter de la Mare (1873–1956)
- Louise Dean (living)
- Warwick Deeping (1877–1950), Sorrell and Son
- Daniel Defoe (1659 or 1661–1731), journalist Robinson Crusoe
- Len Deighton (born 1929), The IPCRESS File
- Joseph Delaney (1945–2022), fantasy
- R. F. Delderfield (1912–1972)
- Thomas Deloney (1543–1600)
- Joolz Denby (born 1955), Billie Morgan
- Nigel Dennis (1912–1989)
- Colin Dexter (1930–2017), Inspector Morse novels
- Nirpal Singh Dhaliwal (born 1974)
- A. A. Dhand (living), crime fiction
- Narinder Dhami (born 1958), children's fiction
- Michael Dibdin (1947–2007), crime fiction
- Charles Dickens (1812–1870), The Pickwick Papers
- Mary Angela Dickens (1862–1948)
- Monica Dickens (1915–1992)
- Anne Hepple Dickinson (1877–1959), romances
- Peter Dickinson (1927–2015)
- Alice Diehl (1844–1912)
- Benjamin Disraeli (1804–1881)
- Ella Hepworth Dixon (1857–1932), The Story of a Modern Woman
- Henry Hall Dixon (1822–1870)
- Catherine Isabella Dodd (1860–1932), educational novels
- William Dodd (1729–1777)
- Ann Doherty (c. 1786 – c. 1831–1832)
- Berlie Doherty (born 1943)
- P. C. Doherty (born 1946)
- David Donachie (1944–2023), nautical historical novels
- Angus Donald (born 1965), historical fiction
- Thomas Doubleday (1790–1870)
- Sarah Doudney (1841–1926)
- Louise Doughty (born 1963)
- Norman Douglas (1858–1952), South Wind
- Siobhan Dowd (1960–2007), children's fiction
- Mary Frances Dowdall (1876–1939)
- Margaret Drabble (born 1939)
- Anna Harriett Drury (1824–1912), novels for children and adults
- William Price Drury (1861–1949)
- Daphne du Maurier (1907–1989), Rebecca
- George du Maurier (1834–1896), Trilby
- Alice Dudeney (1866–1945)
- Ernest Dudley (1908–2006)
- Maureen Duffy (1933–2026)
- Ruth Dugdall (born 1971)
- Alfred Duggan (1903–1964), historical novelist
- Sarah Dunant (born 1950)
- Helen Dunmore (1952–2017), The Siege
- Nell Dunn (born 1936), Up the Junction
- Geoff Dyer (born 1958)

== E ==
- Rae Earl (born 1971)
- Anthony Earnshaw (1924–2001)
- E. R. Eddison (1882–1945)
- Emily Eden (1797–1869)
- John George Edgar (1834–1864), boys' fiction
- May Edginton (1883–1957)
- Robert Edric (born 1956)
- J. T. Edson (1928–2014)
- Annie Edwards (c. 1830–1896)
- Dorothy Edwards (1914–1982), The Witches and the Grinnygog
- Monica Edwards (1912–1998), children's novels
- Stephen Elboz (born 1956), children's novels
- Josephine Elder (1895–1988)
- Susan Elderkin (born 1968), Sunset Over Chocolate Mountains
- George Eliot (1819–1880), Middlemarch.
- Anne Elliot (1856–1941)
- E. S. Elliott (1836–1897)
- Janice Elliott (1931–1995)
- Royston Ellis (1941–2023)
- Warren Ellis (born 1968)
- Roger Jon Ellory (born 1965), thrillers
- Ernest Elmore (John Bude, 1901–1957)
- Ben Elton (born 1959), Stark
- Buchi Emecheta (1944–2017), Second Class Citizen
- Sally Emerson (born 1954)
- Barry England (1932–2009)
- D. J. Enright (1920–2002)
- Sam Enthoven (born 1975), children's novels
- Barbara Erskine (born 1944)
- Susan Ertz (1887–1985)
- Edith Escombe (1866–1950)
- Nicholas Evans (1950–2022)
- Evelyn Everett-Green (1856–1932)
- Stuart Evers (born 1976)
- Leonora Eyles (1889–1960), feminist novels

== F ==
- J. Meade Falkner (1858–1932), Moonfleet
- Duncan Fallowell (born 1948)
- Frederic Farrar (1831–1903), Eric, or, Little by Little
- G. E. Farrow (1862–1919), The Wallypug of Why
- Gertrude Minnie Faulding (1875–1961)
- Sebastian Faulks (born 1953), The Girl at the Lion d'Or
- Millicent Fawcett (1847–1929)
- Elaine Feinstein (1930–2019)
- George Manville Fenn (1831–1909)
- Eliza Fenwick (1766–1840)
- Susan Edmonstone Ferrier (1782–1854)
- Maria Fetherstonhaugh (1847–1918)
- Gabriel Fielding (Alan Gabriel Barnsley 1916–1986)
- Helen Fielding (born 1958), Bridget Jones's Diary
- Henry Fielding (1707–1754), Tom Jones
- Sarah Fielding (1710–1768), The Governess, or The Little Female Academy
- Anne Fine (born 1947), Madame Doubtfire
- Ronald Firbank (1886–1926)
- Tibor Fischer (born 1959), Under the Frog
- Catherine Fisher (born 1957), The Oracle
- Ena Fitzgerald (1889–1962)
- Penelope Fitzgerald (1916–2000), The Blue Flower
- Ian Fleming (1908–1964) the James Bond novels
- Peter Fleming (1907–1971)
- Katie Flynn (Judy Turner, 1936–2019) historical novels
- Lady Angela Forbes (1876–1950)
- Rosita Forbes (1890–1967)
- Ford Madox Ford (1873–1939), The Good Soldier
- C. S. Forester (1899–1966) Horatio Hornblower series
- E. M. Forster (1879–1970), A Passage to India.
- Margaret Forster (1938–2016)
- Frederick Forsyth (1938–2025), The Day of the Jackal
- E. M. Foster, Mrs. (fl. late 18th and early 19th cc.)
- Ellen Thorneycroft Fowler (1860–1929)
- John Fowles (1926–2005), The French Lieutenant's Woman
- Felix Francis (born 1953) crime fiction
- Suzanne Francis (born 1959)
- Antonia Fraser (born 1932)
- George MacDonald Fraser (1925–2008)
- Michael Frayn (born 1933), A Landing on the Sun
- Esther Freud (born 1963)
- James Hain Friswell (1825–1878)
- Alistair Fruish (living)
- Stephen Fry (born 1957)
- Claire Fuller (born 1967), Our Endless Numbered Days

== G ==
- Neil Gaiman (born 1960), Stardust
- John Galsworthy (1867–1933), The Forsyte Saga
- John Gardner (1926–2007) thrillers
- Alex Garland (born 1970), The Beach
- Alan Garner (born 1934) children's novels
- Elizabeth Gaskell (1810–1865), Cranford
- Jamila Gavin (born 1941) children's novels
- Mike Gayle (born 1970), My Legendary Girlfriend
- Hazel Gaynor (born 1971), historical fiction
- Maggie Gee (born 1948)
- Charles Gibbon (1843–1890) Dangerous Connections
- Stella Gibbons (1902–1989), Cold Comfort Farm
- George Gissing (1857–1903), New Grub Street
- Lesley Glaister (born 1956)
- John Glasby (1928–2011)
- Katharine Glasier (1867–1950)
- Connie Glynn (born 1994), young-adult fiction
- Robert Goddard (born 1954)
- Rumer Godden (1907–1998), An Episode of Sparrows
- William Godwin (1756–1836), Things as They Are; or, The Adventures of Caleb Williams
- William Godwin (1803–1832)
- Julia Golding (born 1969), The Diamond of Drury Lane
- William Golding (1911–1993), Lord of the Flies
- Martin J. Goodman (born 1956)
- Jason Goodwin (born 1964), The Janissary Tree
- John Gordon (1925–2017) supernatural fiction
- Catherine Gore (1798–1861)
- Gwen Grant (born 1940) children's fiction
- Joan Grant (1907–1989) historical novels
- Linda Grant (born 1951), The Dark Circle
- Richard Graves (1715–1804)
- Robert Graves (1895–1985), I, Claudius
- Maxwell Gray (Mary Gleed Tuttiett, 1846–1923)
- Henry Green (1905–1973)
- James Green (born 1944)
- Graham Greene (1904–1991), Brighton Rock
- Frederick Greenwood (1830–1909) completed the late Elizabeth Gaskell's Wives and Daughters
- Walter Greenwood (1903–1974), Love on the Dole
- Philippa Gregory (born 1954) historical novels
- Arthur Griffiths (1838–1908) crime novels and military history
- Philip Gross (born 1952)
- Bertha Jane Grundy (1837–1912)
- Arthur Guirdham (1905–1992)
- Elizabeth Gunning (1769–1823)
- Susannah Gunning (c. 1740–1800) epistolary novels
- Emma Jane Guyton (1825–1887), religious novels

== H ==
- Mark Haddon (born 1962), The Curious Incident of the Dog in the Night-Time
- H. Rider Haggard (1856–1925), King Solomon's Mines
- Matt Haig (born 1975)
- Arthur Hailey (1920–2004)
- Sarah Hall (born 1974)
- Simon Hall (born 1969)
- Charles Hamilton (Frank Richards, 1876–1961), Billy Bunter
- Patrick Hamilton (1904–1962), Twenty Thousand Streets Under the Sky
- John Hampson (1901–1955)
- James Hanley (1897–1985), Boy
- Michael Hardcastle (1933–2019), sports fiction
- Thomas Hardy (1840–1928), Far from the Madding Crowd
- Cynthia Harnett (1893–1981), The Wool-Pack
- Joanne Harris (born 1964)
- Robert Harris (born 1957), Fatherland
- M. John Harrison (born 1945), Viriconium series
- Sarah Harrison (born 1946)
- Josephine Hart (1942–2011), Damage
- L. P. Hartley (1895–1972), The Go-Between
- Ann Hatton (1764–1838)
- Joseph Hatton (1837–1907), John Needham's Double
- Desmond Hawkins (1908–1999)
- Jon Haylett (living)
- Frederick William Hayes (1848–1918)
- Carole Hayman (living)
- Mary Hays (1759–1843), Memoirs of Emma Courtney
- Tim Heald (1944–2016)
- Philip Hensher (born 1965)
- G. A. Henty (1832–1902)
- A. P. Herbert (1890–1971), The Water Gipsies
- James Herbert (1943–2013), horror
- Harold Heslop (1898–1983), political novels
- Maurice Hewlett (1861–1923), historical novels
- Georgette Heyer (1902–1974)
- Eleanor Hibbert (Jean Plaidy etc., 1906–1993), historical romance
- Robert Hichens (1864–1950), The Green Carnation
- Jack Higgins (1929–2022)
- Philip E. High (1914–2006), science fiction
- Justin Hill (born 1971)
- Lorna Hill (1902–1991), children's fiction; romances
- Reginald Hill (1936–2012)
- Susan Hill (born 1942), I'm the King of the Castle
- James Hilton (1900–1954), Lost Horizon
- John Buxton Hilton (1921–1986), crime fiction
- Thomas Hinde (1926–2014)
- Joanna Hines (living)
- Jane Aiken Hodge (1917–2009)
- Barbara Hofland (1770–1844), moral stories for children
- Ethel Carnie Holdsworth (1886–1962)
- Margaret Holford (1778–1852)
- Jane Holland (born 1966), Girl Number One
- Sarah Holland (born 1961) romances
- Tom Holland (born 1968), Gothic horror
- Alan Hollinghurst (born 1954), The Line of Beauty
- Victoria Holmes (living)
- Hazel Holt (1928–2015), crime
- Tom Holt (born 1961), fantasy
- William Holt (1897–1977)
- Winifred Holtby (1898–1935), South Riding
- Stewart Home (born 1962)
- Charles Hooton (1810–1847)
- Anthony Hope (1863–1933), invented Ruritania for The Prisoner of Zenda.
- Thomas Hope (1769–1831)
- Sydney Horler (1888–1954), Checkmate
- Nick Hornby (born 1957), About a Boy
- Roy Horniman (1874–1930)
- E. W. Hornung (1866–1921)
- Anthony Horowitz (born 1956)
- Elaine Horseman (1925–1999), children's fantasy fiction
- William Horwood (born 1944), Duncton Wood series
- Emma Hosken (1845–1884)
- Edward Howard (1793–1841), maritime novels
- Elizabeth Jane Howard (1923–2014)
- Fred Hoyle (1915–2001), science fiction
- Pauline von Hügel (1858–1901)
- Richard Hughes (1900–1976), A High Wind in Jamaica
- Thomas Hughes (1822–1896), Tom Brown's Schooldays
- Fergus Hume (1859–1932)
- Eliza Humphreys (Rita, 1850–1938)
- Violet Hunt (1862–1942)
- Douglas Hurd (born 1930)
- Graham Hurley (born 1946), crime fiction
- Arthur Stuart-Menteth Hutchinson (1880–1971)
- Angela Huth (born 1938)
- Aldous Huxley (1894–1963), the dystopian Brave New World

== I ==
- Conn Iggulden (born 1971)
- Elizabeth Inchbald (1753–1821), A Simple Story
- Jean Ingelow (1820–1897)
- Simon Ings (born 1965), Hot Head
- Hammond Innes (1914–1998), thrillers
- Christopher Isherwood (1904–1986)
- Kazuo Ishiguro (born 1954), The Remains of the Day
- Ralph Izzard (1910–1992)

== J ==
- W. W. Jacobs (1863–1943), The Lady of the Barge
- Howard Jacobson (born 1942), The Finkler Question
- Brian Jacques (1939–2011), Redwall
- Frances Jacson (1754–1842), didactic novels
- Muriel Jaeger (1892–1969)
- George Payne Rainsford James (1799–1860)
- Henry James (1843–1916), The Turn of the Screw.
- M. R. James (1862–1936), ghost stories
- P. D. James (1920–2014), crime fiction
- Rosemary Hawley Jarman (1935–2015), historical novels
- Marguerite Florence Laura Jarvis (Oliver Sandys, 1886–1964)
- Robin Jarvis (born 1963), The Whitby Witches
- Edith Spicer Jay (1847–1901), military novels
- John Cordy Jeaffreson (1831–1901)
- Michael Jecks (born 1960), historical mystery novels
- Edgar Jepson (1863–1938)
- Margaret Jepson (1907–2003)
- Selwyn Jepson (1899–1989)
- Jerome K. Jerome (1859–1927), Three Men in a Boat
- Geraldine Jewsbury (1812–1880), stories in Household Words
- Maria Jane Jewsbury (1800–1833)
- W. E. Johns (1893–1968), Biggles books
- B. S. Johnson (1933–1973)
- Antony Johnston (born 1972)
- Diana Wynne Jones (1934–2011), fantasy
- Penny Jordan (1946–2011), romance novels
- Graham Joyce (1954–2014), Some Kind of Fairy Tale
- Alan Judd (born 1946), A Breed of Heroes

== K ==
- Anna Kavan (1901–1968), Ice
- P. J. Kavanagh (1931–2015)
- Joanna Kavenna (living), The Birth of Love
- M. M. Kaye (1908–2004), The Far Pavilions
- Annie Keary (1825–1879), children's writer
- Stephen Kelman (born 1976), Pigeon English
- Gene Kemp (1926–2016), The Turbulent Term of Tyke Tiler
- Edward Augustus Kendall (c. 1776–1842)
- Lena Kennedy (1914–1986), historical romance
- Margaret Kennedy (1896–1967), The Constant Nymph
- Alexander Kent (1924–2017), maritime historical fiction
- Judith Kerr (1923–2019), children's novels
- Lady Amabel Kerr (1846–1906), A Mixed Marriage
- Philip Kerr (1956–2018), historical thrillers
- David Kessler (born 1957)
- Liz Kessler (born 1966), children's novels
- Garry Kilworth (born 1941), science fiction and historical novels
- Charles Kingsley (1819–1875), Westward Ho!.
- Henry Kingsley (1830–1876), Ravenshoe
- Dick King-Smith (1922–2011), The Sheep-Pig
- Rudyard Kipling (1865–1936), Kim
- C. H. B. Kitchin (1895–1967), mystery novels
- Matthew Kneale (born 1960), English Passengers
- Eric Knight (1897–1943), Lassie Come-Home
- Dorothy Koomson (born 1971), My Best Friend's Girl
- Giles Kristian (born 1975), historical novels
- Hari Kunzru (born 1969), The Impressionist
- Hanif Kureishi (born 1954), The Buddha of Suburbia

== L ==
- Olivia Laing (born 1977)
- Charlotte Lamb (1937–2000), romances
- Charles Lambert (born 1953)
- John Lanchester (born 1962)
- Letitia Elizabeth Landon (wrote as L. E. L., 1802–1838)
- Jane Lane (1905–1978), historical novels
- Francis Lathom (1774–1832), Gothic novels
- Janet Lawrence (Julia Lisle, born 1937), crime fiction
- D. H. Lawrence (1885–1930), Lady Chatterley's Lover
- George Alfred Lawrence (1827–1876), Guy Livingston
- John le Carré (1931–2020), The Spy Who Came in from the Cold
- Anthony Lejeune (1928–2018)
- Laurence Lerner (1925–2016)
- Doris Lessing (1919–2013), The Grass Is Singing
- Andrea Levy (1956–2019)
- Deborah Levy (born 1962), Swimming Home
- Alethea Lewis (1749–1787)
- C. S. Lewis (1898–1963), The Chronicles of Narnia
- Matthew Lewis (1775–1818), The Monk
- Ted Lewis (1940–1982), crime fiction
- Marina Lewycka (1946–2025), A Short History of Tractors in Ukrainian
- Nell Leyshon (living), dramatist and novelist
- Mary Linskill (1840–1891)
- S. E. Lister (born 1988)
- Thomas Henry Lister (1800–1842), early silver fork novelist
- Alison Littlewood (living), horror novels
- Adam Lively (born 1961)
- Penelope Lively (born 1933), Moon Tiger
- Richard Llewellyn (1906–1983), How Green Was My Valley
- William John Locke (1863–1930), The Beloved Vagabond
- David Lodge (1935–2025), Thinks ...
- John Lodwick (1916–1959)
- Hugh Lofting (1886–1947), Doctor Dolittle
- Norah Lofts (1904–1983)
- E. C. R. Lorac (Edith Caroline Rivett, 1894–1958), crime fiction
- Jane C. Loudon (1807–1858), early science fiction
- Elinor Lyon (1921–2008), children's novels
- Rosina Bulwer Lytton (1802–1882)

== M ==
- Rose Macaulay (1881–1958), The Towers of Trebizond
- Denis Mackail (1892–1971), Greenery Street
- Serena Mackesy (born 1960s), The Temp
- Mary Mackie (living)
- Paul Magrs (born 1969), Doctor Who novels
- Tom Mallin (1927–1977)
- Allan Mallinson (born 1949), historical novels
- Eric Malpass (1910–1996)
- Miles Mander (1888–1946)
- Guy Mankowski (born 1983)
- Mary E. Mann (1848–1929)
- Keith Mansfield (born 1965), Johnny Mackintosh series
- Alicia Catherine Mant (1788–1869), children's novels
- Hilary Mantel (1952–2022), Wolf Hall
- Russell Mardell (born 1975)
- Stephen Marley (living), fantasy
- Derek Marlowe (1938–1996)
- Emilia Marryat (1835–1875), children's fiction
- Frederick Marryat (1792–1848), Mr Midshipman Easy
- Adam Mars-Jones (born 1954)
- Andrew Martin (born 1962), historical detective novels
- A. E. W. Mason (1865–1948), The Four Feathers
- Carole Matthews (born 1960)
- Sophie Dora Spicer Maude (1854–?)
- William Somerset Maugham (1874–1965), Liza of Lambeth
- William Mayne (1928–2010), A Grass Rope
- F. M. Mayor (1872–1932)
- Una McCormack (born 1972)
- Andy McDermott (born 1974), thrillers
- Ian McEwan (born 1948), Atonement
- Hilary McKay (born 1959), Saffy's Angel
- Katharine McMahon (living), historical novels
- Herman Cyril McNeile (1888–1937), Bulldog Drummond series
- Anna Meades (1734 – probably before 1779)
- Elizabeth Meeke (1761 – c. 1826)
- Paul Mendelson (born 1965)
- Wyl Menmuir (born 1979), The Many
- George Meredith (1828–1909), The Ordeal of Richard Feverel
- Concordia Merrel (1885–1962), romantic fiction
- Stanley Middleton (1919–2009), Holiday
- China Miéville (born 1972), fantasy
- Thomas Miller (1807–1874)
- Mil Millington (living), humour
- Magnus Mills (born 1954), The Field of the Cloth of Gold
- A. A. Milne (1882–1956), The Red House Mystery
- Richard Milward (born 1984), Apples
- David Mitchell (born 1969), number9dream
- Mary Russell Mitford (1787–1855), Our Village
- Nancy Mitford (1904–1973), The Pursuit of Love
- Aly Monroe (fl. 2008–2013)
- Florence Montgomery (1843–1923)
- Alicia Moore (1790–1873)
- Elinor Mordaunt (1872–1942)
- Nicola Morgan (born 1961), Mondays Are Red
- William Morris (1834–1896), News from Nowhere
- Blake Morrison (born 1950)
- Penelope Mortimer (1918–1999), The Pumpkin Eater
- Ralph Hale Mottram (1883–1971)
- Jojo Moyes (born 1969), romances
- Fiona Mozley (born 1988), historical novels
- Clara Mulholland (1849–1934)
- Hector Hugh Munro (Saki, 1870–1916)
- Iris Murdoch (1919–1999), A Severed Head
- Margaret Murphy (born 1959)
- John Murray (born 1950), Murphy's Favourite Channels
- Valerie Grosvenor Myer (1935–2007)
- Ben Myers (born 1976), Richard: A Novel
- Leo Myers (1881–1944)
- Julie Myerson (born 1960), Something Might Happen

== N ==
- V. S. Naipaul (1932–2018), A House for Mr Biswas
- Shiva Naipaul (1945–1985), The Chip-Chip Gatherers
- Mary Anna Needell (1830–1922)
- P. H. Newby (1918–1997), Something to Answer For
- John Henry Newman (1801–1890), Callista
- Beverley Nichols (1898–1983)
- David Nobbs (1935–2015)
- Lawrence Norfolk (born 1963)
- Philip Norman (born 1953)
- Mary Norton (1903–1992), The Borrowers
- Robert Nye (1939–2016)

== O ==
- Ann Oakley (born 1944)
- John Oakman (c. 1748–1793)
- Patrick O'Brian (1914–2000), Aubrey–Maturin series
- Tyne O'Connell (born 1960)
- Ben Okri (born 1959), The Famished Road
- Marina Oliver (born 1934) romances
- Alfred Ollivant (1874–1927)
- Daniel O'Mahony (born 1973)
- Carola Oman (1897–1978), historical fiction
- Tony O'Neill (born 1978)
- Oliver Onions (1873–1961)
- Amelia Opie (1769–1853)
- E. Phillips Oppenheim (1866–1946)
- Emma Orczy ("Baroness Orczy", 1865–1947), The Scarlet Pimpernel.
- George Orwell (1903–1950), Animal Farm
- Sam Osman
- Ouida (1839–1908), Under Two Flags
- Keith Ovenden (1943–2023)

== P ==
- Barry Pain (1864–1928)
- Charlotte Palmer (c. 1762–1834 or after)
- Jane Ellen Panton (1847–1923)
- Edith Pargeter (Ellis Peters, 1913–1995), The Cadfael Chronicles
- Emma Parker (fl. 1809–1817)
- Una-Mary Parker (1930–2019)
- Tim Parks (born 1954), Europa
- Eliza Parsons (1739–1811), Gothic novels
- Mrs Henry de la Pasture (1866–1945), children's novels
- Diana Patrick (1878–1964)
- Phyllis Paul (1903–1973), supernatural fiction
- Michelle Paver (born 1960), Chronicles of Ancient Darkness
- Stel Pavlou (born 1970)
- James Payn (1830–1898)
- David Peace (born 1967)
- Thomas Love Peacock (1785–1866), Headlong Hall
- Mervyn Peake (1911–1968), Gormenghast series
- A. J. Pearce (born 1964), Dear Mrs Bird
- Philippa Pearce (1920–2006), Tom's Midnight Garden
- Frances Mary Peard (1835–1923)
- Margaret Pedler (1877–1948)
- Anne Perry (1938–2023)
- Sarah Perry (born 1979), The Essex Serpent
- Caryl Phillips (born 1958), A Distant Shore
- Mary Pilkington (1761–1839), children's fiction
- Sarah Pinborough (born 1972), thriller fiction
- Harold Pinter (1930–2008)
- Sarah Pitt (fl. 1881–1900), children's fiction
- Denis Pitts (1930–1994)
- Dudley Pope (1925–1997), nautical historical Lord Ramage series
- Anna Maria Porter (1780–1832)
- Jane Porter (1776–1850), The Scottish Chiefs
- Sheena Porter (born 1935), children's novels
- Raymond Postgate (1896–1971), Verdict of Twelve
- Anthony Powell (1905–2000), A Dance to the Music of Time
- John Cowper Powys (1872–1963), A Glastonbury Romance
- T. F. Powys (1875–1953), Mr. Weston's Good Wine
- Terry Pratchett (1948–2015)
- H. F. M. Prescott (1896–1972), historical fiction
- Christopher Priest (1943–2024), science fiction
- J. B. Priestley (1894–1984), The Good Companions
- Alison Prince (1931–2019)
- Eric Pringle (1935–2017), children's fiction
- V. S. Pritchett (1900–1997)
- Philip Pullman (born 1946), His Dark Materials
- Barbara Pym (1913–1980)

== Q ==
- Arthur Quiller-Couch (1863–1944)
- Ann Quin (1936–1973)
- A. J. Quinnell (Philip Nicholson, 1940–2005), Man on Fire

== R ==
- Ann Radcliffe (1764–1823), The Mysteries of Udolpho
- Gwynedd Rae (1892–1977), Mary Plain stories
- Arthur Ransome (1884–1967), Swallows and Amazons
- Frederic Raphael (born 1931), The Glittering Prizes
- Julian Rathbone (1935–2008)
- Derek Raymond (Robin Cook, 1931–1994)
- Miss Read (Dora Jessie Saint, 1913–2012), Miss Clare Remembers
- Charles Reade (1814–1884), The Cloister and the Hearth
- Douglas Reeman (1924–2017), historical naval novelist
- Clara Reeve (1729–1807), The Old English Baron
- Mary Renault (1905–1983), young-adult historical novels
- Ruth Rendell (aka Barbara Vine) (1930–2015), King Solomon's Carpet
- Dan Rhodes (born 1972)
- Pam Rhodes (born 1950)
- Jean Rhys (1890–1979), Wide Sargasso Sea
- Dorothy Richardson (1873–1957)
- Samuel Richardson (1689–1761), Pamela; or, Virtue Rewarded
- Charlotte Riddell (1832–1906)
- Willie Riley (1866–1961), Windyridge
- E. Arnot Robertson (1903–1961)
- Denise Robins (1897–1985)
- Gertrude Minnie Robins (Mrs Baillie Reynolds, 1861–1939)
- Frederick William Robinson (1830–1901)
- Peter Robinson (1950–2022), crime fiction
- Ray Robinson (born 1971)
- Regina Maria Roche (1764–1845), Gothic novels
- Sax Rohmer (1883–1959), created Dr. Fu Manchu
- Frederick Rolfe (1860–1913), Hadrian the Seventh
- Isabella Frances Romer (1798–1852)
- Michael Rosen (born 1946), children's fiction
- J. K. Rowling (born 1965), Harry Potter series
- Martin Rowson (born 1959)
- James Runcie (born 1959), The Grantchester Mysteries
- Salman Rushdie (born 1947), Midnight's Children
- Edward Rutherfurd (Francis Edward Wintle, born 1948), Sarum

== S ==
- Vita Sackville-West (1892–1962)
- Anbara Salam, historical fiction
- Jane Sanderson (born 1962)
- Steven Savile (born 1969) thrillers
- Dorothy L. Sayers (1893–1957), Lord Peter Wimsey series
- Simon Scarrow (born 1962), Eagle series
- Caroline Lucy Scott (1784–1857), A Marriage in High life
- Hardiman Scott (1920–1999)
- Paul Scott (1920–1987), The Raj Quartet
- Sarah Scott (1723–1795), Millenium Hall (sic)
- Will Scott (1893−1964), Disher, Detective
- Kate Sedley (Brenda Margaret Lilian Clarke, 1926–2022), historical novels
- Will Self (born 1961)
- Ian Serraillier (1912–1994), The Silver Sword
- Diane Setterfield (born 1964), The Thirteenth Tale
- Tim Severin (1940–2020), historical novels
- Miranda Seymour (born 1948)
- Nicholas Shakespeare (born 1957), The Dancer Upstairs
- Tom Sharpe (1928–2013), Wilt
- Joss Sheldon (born 1982)
- Mary Shelley (1797–1851), Frankenstein
- Joseph Henry Shorthouse (1834–1903), John Inglesant
- Nevil Shute (1899–1960), A Town Like Alice
- Gareth Sibson (born 1977)
- Una Lucy Silberrad (1872–1955)
- Alan Sillitoe (1928–2010), Saturday Night and Sunday Morning
- Dorothy Simpson (1933–2020), mystery novels
- Helen Simpson (born 1957)
- Clive Sinclair (1948–2018)
- Sarah Singleton (born 1966)
- Indra Sinha (born 1950)
- Eleanor Sleath (1770–1847), Gothic novels
- Dodie Smith (1896–1990), The Hundred and One Dalmatians
- Emma Smith (1923–2018), Maidens' Trip
- Jonathan Smith (born 1942)
- Stevie Smith (1902–1971)
- Zadie Smith (born 1975), White Teeth
- C. P. Snow (1905–1980), Strangers and Brothers series
- Stephen Southwold (1887–1964), science fiction and other novels
- Emily Spender (1841–1922)
- Lillian Spender (1835–1895)
- Stephen Spender (1909–1995)
- Louisa Stanhope (fl. 1806–1827)
- Flora Annie Steel (1847–1929)
- Jessica Steele (1933–2020)
- Gladys Bronwyn Stern (1890–1973)
- Laurence Sterne (1713–1768), Tristram Shandy
- Mary Stewart (1916–2014), historical fiction
- Julian Stockwin (born 1944), nautical fiction
- David Storey (1933–2017), Saville
- Catherine Storr (1913–2001), Marianne Dreams
- Jack Trevor Story (1917–1991)
- Randolph Stow (1935–2010)
- Hesba Stretton (1832–1911), children's fiction
- Alexander Stuart (born 1955), The War Zone
- Vivian Stuart (1914–1986), romances
- Rosemary Sutcliff (1920–1992), The Eagle of the Ninth
- Deborah Swift (born 1955), historical fiction, also as Davina Blake
- Graham Swift (born 1949), Last Orders.
- Jonathan Swift (1667–1745), Gulliver's Travels
- Meera Syal (born 1961), Anita and Me
- Mitchell Symons (born 1957)

== T ==
- Elizabeth Taylor (1912–1975), The Real Life of Angel Deverell
- G. P. Taylor (born 1958), Shadowmancer
- Philip Meadows Taylor (1808–1876), Confessions of a Thug
- Barry Tebb (born 1942)
- Lisa St Aubin de Terán (born 1953)
- J. E. Harold Terry (1885–1939)
- James Thackara (born 1944), The Book of Kings
- William Makepeace Thackeray (1811–1863), Vanity Fair
- Stephanie Theobald (born 1966)
- Angela Thirkell (1890–1961)
- Adam Thirlwell (born 1978)
- Elizabeth Thomas (1770/1771–1855)
- Adam Thorpe (born 1956), Ulverton
- Colin Thubron (born 1939), A Cruel Madness
- Stella Tillyard (living)
- Peter Tinniswood (1936–2003), I Didn't Know You Cared
- Alan Titchmarsh (born 1949)
- Barbara Euphan Todd (1890–1976), Miss Ranskill Comes Home
- J. R. R. Tolkien (1892–1973), The Lord of the Rings
- Theresa Tomlinson (born 1946), The Moon Riders
- Paige Toon (born 1975), Jessie Jefferson series
- Sue Townsend (1946–2014), Adrian Mole
- Geoffrey Trease (1909–1998), Bows Against the Barons
- Miles Tredinnick (born 1955), Fripp
- Henry Treece (1911–1966), The Children's Crusade
- Rose Tremain (born 1943), historical novels
- Sarah Trimmer (1741–1810), Fabulous Histories
- Anthony Trollope (1815–1882), Barchester Towers
- Lynne Truss (born 1955)
- Charlotte Maria Tucker (A.L.O.E., 1821–1893)
- Philip Turner (1925–2006)
- Thomas F. Tweed (1891–1940)

== U ==
- Evelyn Underhill (1875–1941)
- Barry Unsworth (1930–2012), Sacred Hunger.
- Cathi Unsworth (living)
- Allen Upward (1863–1926)
- Edward Upward (1903–2009)
- Alison Uttley (1884–1976), children's novels

== V ==
- John Van der Kiste (born 1954)
- R. V. Vernède (1905–2003)
- Frances Vernon (1963–1991)
- Salley Vickers (born 1948)
- Sherard Vines (1890–1974)
- Elfrida Vipont (1902–1992), historical and young-adult fiction

== W ==
=== Wa–Wg ===
- John Wain (1925–1994), Young Shoulders.
- H. Russell Wakefield (1888–1964)
- George Walker (1772–1847)
- Doreen Wallace (1897–1987)
- Edgar Wallace (1875–1932)
- Nick Wallace (born 1972)
- David Walliams (born 1971), children's fiction
- Leo Walmsley (1892–1966)
- Hugh Walpole (1884–1941)
- Jill Paton Walsh (1937– 2020), adult and children's writer
- Sheila Walsh (1928–2009)
- Guy Walters (born 1971)
- Vanessa Walters (born 1978)
- Amy Catherine Walton (1849–1939), children's novels
- Mary Augusta Ward (1851–1920), The History of David Grieve
- Sarah Ward (living)
- Florence Warden (1857–1929)
- Rex Warner (1905–1986)
- Blanche Warre-Cornish (1844–1922)
- Keith Waterhouse (1929–2009), Billy Liar
- Victor Watson (born 1936), children's novels
- Auberon Waugh (1939–2001)
- Evelyn Waugh (1903–1966), Decline and Fall
- Anne Weale (1929–2007)
- Catherine Webb (born 1986), young adult novels
- Marion St John Webb (1888–1930), children's fiction
- Mary Webb (1881–1927), Precious Bane
- Samantha Weinberg (living)
- Alison Weir (living), Innocent Traitor
- Ronald Welch (1909–1982), children's historical novels
- Fay Weldon (1931–2023), The Life and Loves of a She-Devil
- H. G. Wells (1866–1946), The Time Machine
- Louise Wener (born 1967)
- Mary Wesley (1912–2002), The Camomile Lawn
- Charles West (1927–2021), crime novels
- Jane West (1758–1852)
- Rebecca West (1892–1983)
- Robert Westall (1929–1993), The Machine Gunners
- William Bury Westall (1834–1903)
- Frank Atha Westbury (1838–1901), mystery fiction
- Stanley J. Weyman (1855–1928), historical romance

=== Wh–Wz ===
- Patience Wheatcroft (born 1951)
- Dennis Wheatley (1897–1977), The Devil Rides Out
- Dorothy Whipple (1893–1966)
- Charles Whistler (1856–1913), historical novels
- Evelyn Whitaker (1844–1929), didactic novels for young
- Antonia White (1899–1980), Frost in May
- Fred M. White (1859–1935), science-fiction and disaster novelist
- Hale White (1831–1913)
- Michael White (1959–2018)
- T. H. White (1906–1964), The Sword in the Stone
- Tony White (born 1964)
- Richard Whiteing (1840–1928)
- Charles Whiting (1926–2007)
- Peter Wildeblood (1923–1999)
- Vaughan Wilkins (1890–1959)
- Charles Williams (1886–1945), Descent into Hell
- Charlie Williams (born 1971)
- Nigel Williams (born 1948)
- Robina Williams (living)
- Henry Williamson (1895–1977), Tarka the Otter
- Ted Willis (1914–1992) (Baron Willis)
- A. N. Wilson (born 1950)
- Angus Wilson (1913–1991)
- R. D. Wingfield (1928–2007)
- Jeanette Winterson (born 1959)
- P. G. Wodehouse (1881–1975), Jeeves and Wooster
- Mary Wollstonecraft (1759–1797)
- Christopher Wood (1935–2015)
- Ellen Wood (1814–1887), East Lynne
- Ramsay Wood (born 1943), Kalila and Dimna
- Martin Woodhouse (1932–2011)
- Richard Woodman (1944–2024)
- Margaret Louisa Woods (1856–1945)
- Virginia Woolf (1882–1941), Mrs Dalloway
- S. Fowler Wright (1874–1965), Deluge
- John Wyndham (1903–1969), The Day of the Triffids

== Y ==
- Jane Yardley (living)
- Dornford Yates (1885–1960), The House That Berry Built
- Ann Yearsley (c. 1753–1806)
- Victor Maslin Yeates (1897–1934)
- Tamar Yellin (living)
- Charlotte Mary Yonge (1823–1901), The Heir of Redclyffe
- Margaret Yorke (1924–2012)
- E. H. Young (1880–1945)
- F. E. Mills Young (1875–1945)
- Robyn Young (born 1975), Brethren

== Z ==
- Helen Zahavi (born 1966), Dirty Weekend
- Israel Zangwill (1864–1926)
- Louis Zangwill (1869–1938)

== See also ==
- List of English writers
- List of novelists
