= Bilton =

Bilton may refer to:

== Places in England ==
- Bilton, Northumberland
- Bilton, Warwickshire
- Bilton, East Riding of Yorkshire
- Bilton, Harrogate, North Yorkshire
- Bilton-in-Ainsty, North Yorkshire
- New Bilton, Warwickshire

== Buildings ==
- Bilton Grange, Warwickshire
- Bilton Hall, North Yorkshire, large country house near Harrogate, England
- Bilton Hall, Warwickshire, mansion house at Bilton, Warwickshire
- Bilton School, Warwickshire

== People with the surname ==
- Bilton (surname)

== See also ==
- Bilton Grange (disambiguation)
