= Moon Rider =

Moon Rider can refer to:

- Moon Rider, an arcade game by Aackosoft
- Moon Rider, a children's novel in the Zac Power series "Mega Mission"
- Moon Rider, a documentary following bicycle racer Rasmus Quaade directed by Daniel Dencik
- Moon Rider, a character in multiplayer online battle arena Defense of the Ancients
- "Moon Rider", a song by BDC from the album The Intersection: Discovery
- "Moon Rider", a song by Jai Wolf
- "Moon Rider", a song by Moxy from the album Moxy
- "Moon Rider", a song by Wipers from the album Wipers Live

== See also ==
- Café Moon Rider a project by installation artist Tatzu Nishi
- Moonriders, a Japanese rock band
- The Moon Riders, a novel by Theresa Thomlinson
