= Imperfect Lady =

Imperfect Lady may refer to:

- The Perfect Gentleman (film), also titled The Imperfect Lady, a 1935 American comedy
- The Imperfect Lady (1947 film), an American drama
- An Imperfect Lady, 1989 English historical chronicle by Sarah Harrison (novelist)
