= Bilton (surname) =

Bilton is a surname. Notable people with the surname include:

- Alan Bilton, British academic and novelist
- Caroline Bilton (born 1976), British television presenter
- Belle Bilton (1866–1906), music hall actress
- Flo Bilton (1921–2004), English association football coach and administrator
- Gavin Bilton (born 1988), Welsh strongman competitor
- Greg Bilton (born 1965), Lieutenant-General in the Australian Army
- James Bilton (1908–1988), Canadian politician
- John Bilton, English football coach and former player
- Michael Bilton (1919–1993), British actor
- Nick Bilton, British non-fiction author
