= Mslexia =

British magazine for women writers

- Frequency: Quarterly
- Publisher: Mslexia Publications Limited
- Founder: Debbie Taylor
- Founded: March 1999; 26 years ago
- Website: http://www.mslexia.co.uk/

Mslexia is a British magazine for women writers, founded and edited by Debbie Taylor. Mslexia contains articles and resources on writers, writing, and publishing. Writers who have contributed articles include Diana Evans, Helen Mort, Hannah Lowe, Jackie Kay and Malika Booker. It was first published in March 1999 and is produced four times a year. Mslexia has about 11,000 subscribers.

== Name ==
The name is a portmanteau of Ms, for woman, and lexia, meaning words.

According to the official Mslexia website:

Mslexia means women's writing (ms = woman lexia = words). Its association with dyslexia is intentional. Dyslexia is a difficulty, more prevalent in men, with reading and spelling. Mslexia is a difficulty, more prevalent in women, with getting into print. Mslexia is the complex set of conditions and expectations that prevents women, who as girls so outshine boys in verbal skills, from becoming successful authors. The magazine Mslexia aims to define, explore and help overcome the condition of mslexia and provide a platform and playground for women writers. Its intention is to provide information, guidance and inspiration for published and unpublished authors, and improve the quality and standing of women's literature.

== Content ==
Each quarter, a guest judge picks the best prose and poetry new writing on a theme specified in a previous issue. Past guest judges have included Val McDermid, Kirsty Gunn, Deborah Moggach, and Helen Simpson.

There are also opportunities for readers to contribute to the rest of the magazine, such as the autobiographical and Flash fiction sections which also have set themes.

== Competitions ==
Mslexia runs several annual writing competitions, with categories across short story, flash fiction and poetry, and a novel competition with a first prize of £5,000. Past judges have included U. A. Fanthorpe and R. V. Bailey (Poetry Competition; 2007), Katherine Rundell (Children's Novel Competition; 2018) and Hilary Mantel (Adult Novel Competition; 2021).

The back section of the magazine contains book reviews and listings including national and regional events, competitions, writing courses and publications seeking submissions.

== Controversy ==
In September 2020, the magazine asked author Amanda Craig to step down as a competition judge after she signed an open letter to The Sunday Times criticising online abuse of J. K. Rowling. Rowling's comments on gender and sex had become the focus of a divisive debate on social media. In a statement to The Bookseller, the magazine's board said:

if a Mslexia judge expresses views that threaten to undermine Mslexia's climate of welcome and inclusivity, we will always ask her to step down from that role.
