= Sam Hepburn =

British novelist

- Education: Cambridge University
- Occupation: Author
- Writing career
- Pen name: Sam Osman
- Notable works: Quicksilver; Chasing the Dark; If You Were Me
- Website: www.samhepburnbooks.com

Sam Hepburn, who has previously written under the name Sam Osman, is a British fiction author, including young adult novels and novels for adults.

== Biography ==
Hepburn studied modern languages at Cambridge University before joining the BBC as a general trainee. Her career has included documentary filmmaking. She has lived and worked in London, Lebanon, Sudan and Washington DC.

Under the name Sam Osman, she wrote her debut novel Quicksilver, which explores the themes of ley lines, stone circles, and ancient holy sites such as Stonehenge in England, Meroe in Sudan, and Mount Shasta in the United States. Reviewers include Amanda Craig in The Times, Toby Clements in The Telegraph, and Rosemary Stones in Books for Keeps. A review by James Lovegrove in the Financial Times stated "It would be glib but not inaccurate to describe Quicksilver as 'Dan Brown for younger readers'." In a review for The School Librarian Alison Maxwell-Cox wrote, "Readers of 9 and above would enjoy the twists and turns of the plot. Many features of the book are based on real historical evidence, or legends which might be true."

She also wrote the young adult novels Serpent's Gold under the name Sam Osman, and then Chasing the Dark and If You Were Me under the name Sam Hepburn. In a review of Chasing the Dark, Janet Clarke in The School Librarian described the book as an "exciting read" and "fast paced story", and noted it was written as the first part of a series. According to BookTrust, the book is and "excellent contemporary detective story" that "will appeal to both boys and girls." In a review for Books for Keeps, Andrea Reece writes, "Despite the twists and turns of the plot, and a large cast of characters, the writing style ensures that the action is easy to follow."

If You Were Me was described by Jo Sennitt in a review for The School Librarian as "a tough tale with lots of talking points about the media, stereotyping, human rights and morality; but it is also an action-packed story with solid central characters and a satisfying resolution." According to Book Trust, "Complex plotting, thoughtful characterisation and terrifying insights into a world of organised crime will keep readers on the edge of their seats." In a review for Books for Keeps, Matthew Martin writes, "It is credit to Hepburn’s skill as a thriller writer that no matter how complex the plot becomes, all remains clear and readers will be kept right on the edge of their seats from beginning to end."

Hepburn then continued in her writing career as Sam Hepburn, and wrote several novels for adults, including Gone Before, Her Perfect Life, and The Mistake I Made.

== Honors and awards ==
- 2017 CWA Margery Allingham Short Story award

== Selected works ==
- Osman, Sam. Quicksilver. Marion Lloyd Books, 2010
- Osman, Sam. Serpent's Gold, Marion Lloyd Books, 2011
- Hepburn, Sam. Chasing the Dark. Chicken House, 2013
- Hepburn, Sam. If You Were Me. Chicken House, 2015

== Personal life ==
Hepburn is married with children and resides in London.
