= Ruth Dugdall =

English novelist

Ruth Dugdall is a novelist from Felixstowe, Suffolk, UK. Her fiction falls into the genre of crime writing, with a particular focus upon forensics. She specialises in domestic noir.

== Early life and education ==
Dugdall studied a degree in English and Theatre Studies at Warwick University and gained an MA in Social Work from the University of East Anglia.

== Career ==
Dugdall was inspired by a prison drama workshop that she attended, and so decided to train as a probation officer. Working in this area, she specialised in contact with offenders deemed "high risk", with inmates who had often been found guilty of stalking, rape and murder. Dugdall qualified as a probation officer in 1996. These experiences offered her an insight into forensic psychology, which informed her crime writing. Dugdall's novel The Woman Before Me and its follow-up The Sacrificial Man were published by Legend Press. The former won the Debut Dagger Award, and sold 45,000 copies, thereby making it one of Legend Press's bestselling titles. Dugdall said "I write to reflect my own experiences ... when I wrote The Woman Before Me I had just had a baby, and the novel was a sort of therapy during those early months with no sleep and plenty of anxiety. And of course my protagonist is a probation officer, reflecting my own past career." Euro Crime described The Sacrificial Man as "a readable, very well-plotted tale, with believable and sympathetic characters". Legend Press acquired world rights for her next two novels, Humber Boy B and Nowhere Girl.

Humber Boy B covers the case of two young boys who are found guilty of murdering another child, and was published in April 2015. Nowhere Girl is due for release in October 2015. The Sunday Times described the novel as "The menace is skilfully intensified by Dugdall ... a twisting labyrinth of child-trafficking and police cover ups". Both books feature Dugdall's probation officer character, Cate Austin, who was the central protagonist of The Woman Before Me. Dugdall has appeared on BBC Radio's Woman's Hour and she was a judge on the panel of the 2014 Luke Bitmead Bursary.

Her 2017 novel My Sister And Other Liars was described as "a brilliant mystery, with an uncomfortable dark side".
