= Nicola Morgan =

British author (born 1961)

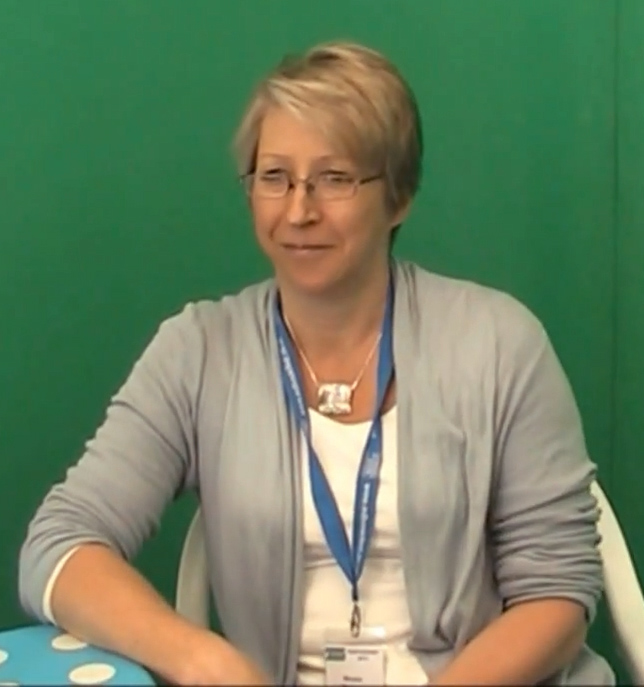
Nicola Morgan in August 2011

Nicola Morgan (born 1961) is a British author, best known for her teenage fiction including Mondays Are Red and her later non-fiction about adolescence, including Blame My Brain - the amazing teenage brain revealed.

== Biography ==
Nicola Morgan was born in 1961 in a boys' boarding school to schoolteacher parents, who kept moving from school to school. Her father taught English and French and her mother taught mathematics and science. These were all boys' schools and so, when she was eleven, Nicola was sent to a girls' boarding school. She later went to Cambridge University where she read Classics and Philosophy.

Morgan wanted to become a writer after leaving university, but to earn a living first became a teacher, working in a small school in London where she taught English. Morgan took a Royal Society of Arts diploma in teaching people with Dyslexia and began to specialise in dyslexia and literacy acquisition. Morgan set up a website, The Child Literacy Centre, to help parents help their children with all aspects of reading. She ran this until closing the service in 2009. In 2009, she started "Help! I Need a Publisher!", a blog for writers.

== Writing ==
By 1999, Morgan had published dozens of best-selling home-learning books, while still working towards publication as a novelist. Her first novel, Mondays are Red, was published to acclaim in 2002 and was followed the next year by Fleshmarket, which became widely read and studied in Scottish schools. By 2010, she had published nine novels, all but one for teenagers, and five non-fiction books, including the internationally acclaimed Blame My Brain.

== Bibliography ==
=== Fiction ===
- Mondays Are Red (2002)
- Fleshmarket (2003)
- Sleepwalking (2004)
- The Passionflower Massacre (2005)
- Chicken Friend (2006)
- The Highwayman's Footsteps (2006)
- The Highwayman's Curse (2007)
- Deathwatch (2009)
- Wasted (2010)

=== Non-fiction ===
- People Who Made History in Ancient Greece (2000)
- Blame My Brain (2005; updated editions 2007, 2013 and 2022)
- The Leaving Home Survival Guide (2005)
- Know Your Brain (2007)
- Reality Check: Curses (2008)
- Write To Be Published (2011)
- Tweet Right - The Sensible Person's Guide To Twitter (2011)
- Write a Great Synopsis (2012)
- Dear Agent (2013)
- The Teenage Guide to Stress (2014)
- The Teenage Guide to Friends (2017)
- The Teenage Guide to Life Online (2018)
- The Awesome Power of Sleep (2021)
- Be Resilient (2021)
- Ten Ways to Build a Brilliant Brain (2022)
- No Worries - how to deal with teenage anxiety (2023)

== Sources ==
- Official website
