= Paula Brackston =

English author

- Born: Dorset, England
- Education: Lancaster University
- Occupations: Writer; Visiting lecturer
- Writing career
- Pen name: P. J. Brackston; P. J. Davy; Mabli Roberts
- Genres: Contemporary fantasy Historical fantasy Historical mystery
- Website: paulabrackston.com pjbrackston.com

Paula Brackston (aka P. J. Brackston, P. J. Davy, and Mabli Roberts) is the New York Times bestselling author of The Witch's Daughter and other historical fantasy novels. She also writes the fantasy crime Brothers Grimm Mystery series under the pseudonym P. J. Brackston.

== Life and writing career ==
Prior to solidifying her career as a fiction writer, Brackston worked as a groom on a racing yard, a travel agent, a secretary, an English teacher, and a goat herd. She attended Lancaster University, where she received her M.A. in creative writing. Brackston is also a visiting lecturer at the University of Wales, Newport.

She was born in Dorset, England, and grew up in Wales, where she now lives with her partner and their two children. She has lived in Brecon Beacons National Park in Wales, where The Winter Witch takes place, and spent six years in central London near Fitzroy Square, where The Midnight Witch is set in seventeenth-century England. Elizabeth Anne Hawksmith, the main character of The Witch's Daughter, lived in Brackston's hometown of Dorset.

Brackston's debut novel, The Witch’s Daughter, was originally published in February 2009 under the title The Book of Shadows and was intended as the first book in the proposed Shadow Chronicles series, followed by The Winter Witch. However, each of the novels are standalones that explore witches and their experiences through different times and settings. The Witch’s Daughter spawned a sequel titled The Return of the Witch in 2016. In Lamp Black, Wolf Grey, Brackston introduces Merlin as one of the main characters in the story.

== Bibliography ==
=== As Paula Brackston ===
Found Things

- The Little Shop of Found Things (2018)
- Secrets of the Chocolate House (2019)
- The Garden of Promises and Lies (2020)
- City of Time and Magic (2021)

The Hecate Cavendish Series

- The Haunting of Hecate Cavendish (2024)
- The Cathedral of Lost Souls (2025)
- Hecate Cavendish and the Angel of Death (2026) (Upcoming)

The Witch’s Daughter

- The Witch’s Daughter (2011, originally titled The Book of Shadows and published by Snowbooks in 2009)
- The Return of the Witch (2016)

Short Story

- The Witches of the Blue Well (December 2012, prelude to The Winter Witch)

Standalone Novels

- The Winter Witch (2013)
- The Midnight Witch (2014)
- The Silver Witch (2015)
- Lamp Black, Wolf Grey (2015, first published by Snowbooks in 2010)

Nonfiction

- The Dragon's Trail: Wales on Horseback (1999)

Anthologies

- In Her Element: Women and the Landscape (2008)
- Front Porch: American Athenaeum (2013)

=== As P. J. Brackston ===
Detective Gretel

- Gretel and the Case of the Missing Frog Prints (2015)
- Once Upon a Crime (2015)
- The Case of the Fickle Mermaid (2016)
- The Sorcerer’s Appendix (2017)

=== As P. J. Davy ===
- Nutters (2009)
- Village Fate: A Country Tale of Cooks, Crooks and Chickens (2010)

=== As Mabli Roberts ===
- God's Children (2019)
