= Mondays Are Red =

Novel

Mondays are Red
- First edition (publ. Hodder & Stoughton)
- Author: Nicola Morgan
- Language: English
- Publication date: 2002

Mondays are Red is a 2002 young-adult novel by English writer Nicola Morgan and her debut novel. The novel details the experiences of a fourteen-year-old boy surviving a severe case of meningitis and waking up from a coma to find his whole world transformed. Luke Patterson developed an extreme and fictional form of synesthesia and must decide between what is good and evil, all while fighting the temptation of a dangerous power.

== Plot ==
Luke is a fourteen-year-old boy who wakes from a coma to discover that the evil and disturbing presence named "Dreeg" has taken up residence in his head. Dreeg causes visual and auditory hallucinations, some of which are symptomatic of synesthesia. Ashamed and frightened, Luke doesn't tell his family about Dreeg or the synesthesia, leading his family and doctors to believe that he made a full recovery. In the following days, however, Luke develops a limp that resigns him to a wheelchair. Upon returning home, Luke has malicious thoughts towards his older sister Laura and is convinced by Dreeg that he can manipulate reality however he wants. Encouraged by Dreeg to begin running, Luke discovers that he can fly. He also finds that he can control minds and that there were rules to his power. First, Luke had to practice and, secondly, he needed Dreeg. With the help of Dreeg's coaching, Luke conjured up a deaf girl he calls Seraphina, showing him the extents of his power.

His enjoyment over his powers comes to an end when a creative writing assignment results in one student's face becoming morphed and deformed when the teacher reads Luke's story aloud. A figure also appears outside of the class window. After the students rush to the window Luke denies that anything occurred, returning everything to normal and causing him to realize that his power came with repercussions. As the novel progresses Luke begins to lose control of his mind to Dreeg and his malicious thoughts towards his sister Laura increase to the point that Luke dreams of her death. Luke wants to give up his powers but is convinced otherwise by Dreeg, leaving Luke at his mercy.

The book culminates with the disappearance of Laura in the local woods. Together with his best friend Tom, Seraphina, and his dog, Luke goes to rescue Laura and manages to successfully defeat Dreeg, but at the cost of a portion of his mind and the loss of Seraphina. During the fight the woods catches on fire, however the group is rescued by paramedics and rushed to the hospital. Now left without memories of his powers, Seraphina, and many of the events from the book, Luke comes to terms with both his synesthesia and the missing pieces of his mind while staying with his grandfather.

== Reception ==
Critical reception has been positive. Many of the reviews praised the work as a good literary debut for Morgan and The Sunday Telegraph noted that it was "oddly brilliant". In a review for The Independent, Nicholas Tucker stated that Mondays Are Red was "a novel to brood over".
