= Phyllis Paul =

British novelist of psychological thrillers and mysteries

Phyllis Paul (1903 - 1973) was an English novelist.

== Career ==
She published eleven novels between 1933 and 1967. She herself considered that the first two, We Are Spoiled and The Children Triumphant, the second of which was published in 1934, were juvenilia and her later novels did not list them. Her first two novels were published by Martin Secker, but her subsequent books by Heinemann. Her mature works have been described as "literary supernatural thrillers", "masterly in their handling of their plots". She has been described as a "subtle novelist, her work invok[ing] an atmosphere of the supernatural and often allow[ing] for a supernatural interpretation", and as "writ[ing] out of a coherent and consistent imagination".

== Death and legacy ==
Paul died on August 30, 1973 when she was struck by a motorcycle while crossing the road in Hastings, her identity only ascertained thanks to a tag on her handkerchief. Her heir was her friend Lydia M. Lee, whose estate was left to her niece. Her novels fell out of print after her death, and copies became later prized by collectors, selling for hundreds of dollars. In 2012 A Cage for the Nightingale was republished by Sundial Press, who also reprinted Pulled Down in 2021. Twice Lost was republished by McNally Editions in 2023.

== Works ==
- We Are Spoiled, 1933
- The Children Triumphant, 1934
- Camilla, 1949
- Constancy, 1951
- The Lion of Cooling Bay, 1953
- Rox Hall Illuminated, 1956
- A Cage for the Nightingale, 1957
- Twice Lost, 1960 (also published in the US by W. W. Norton & Company)
- A Little Treachery, 1962 (also published in the US by W. W. Norton & Company)
- Pulled Down, 1964 (also published as Echo of Guilt by Lancer Books in 1966)
- An Invisible Darkness, 1967
