= A Vicious Circle =

1996 book by Amanda Craig

- First edition
- Author: Amanda Craig
- Language: English
- Publisher: Fourth Estate
- Publication date: 1996
- Media type: Print ()

A Vicious Circle is a 1996 satirical novel by Amanda Craig set in the world of publishing. Described as a roman a clef, it was originally withdrawn by publisher Hamish Hamilton when Craig’s ex-boyfriend, David Sexton, threatened to sue. A rewritten version was published by Fourth Estate.

== Plot summary ==
The novel chronicles the life of Amelia, the only daughter of newspaper tycoon Max de Monde who, after having spoiled Amelia beyond hope while she was still young, abandons her when she becomes pregnant. Amelia decides to marry Mark Crawley, the father of her child, an ambitious young critic intent on shaking off his humble background. Suddenly, the young couple find themselves in desperate need of money and, at first, accommodation. While she stays at home raising their daughter Rose, Amelia metamorphoses from spoiled brat to mature and responsible mother, whereas her husband loses all interest in the housewife he now realizes he has married. Amelia is encouraged to stay on her chosen path by Grace, her cleaning woman—who is also her niece (without either of the women being aware of this), and by Tom Viner, a young doctor who becomes their lodger.

A Vicious Circle also follows the life of Mary Quinn. An Irish girl lacking a university education, Mary has a natural writing talent and rises to become a prominent reviewer of new fiction after having been left by her lover of many years, Mark Crawley. Mary makes friends with Adam Sands, a yet unpublished author who keeps his homosexuality a secret from almost everyone including his own mother. When he is dying of an AIDS-related disease, Mary is the only person who remembers and eventually takes care of him.

When the recession of the 1990s hits the country everyone seems to be affected by it. Max de Monde, who has even plundered his daughter's trust fund, spectacularly commits suicide by crashing his helicopter against the ground. Amelia leaves Mark and is planning to raise her daughter as a single parent.

== Reception ==
The novel became, according to The Independent, "a literary sensation before it was even published". The New York Times called it "a vicious roman a clef", and Craig has described how her ex-boyfriend, literary critic David Sexton, believed himself to be "unflatteringly depicted" in the novel. Sexton threatened to sue, and as a result the book’s publication was cancelled by Hamish Hamilton. A rewritten version was later published by Fourth Estate. On publication of the book, several people from the literary world also "happily proffered themselves as candidates" for some of the other characters.
