= Robina Williams =

English author

- Born: Cheshire, England
- Education: Oxford University; Liverpool University
- Occupation: Author

Robina Williams is an English author.

== Biography ==
Williams was born in a small village in Cheshire. She lives in Liverpool. She has an Honours degree in Modern Languages from Oxford University and a Master of Philosophy research degree in English literature from Liverpool University. Her research thesis was on the links between Wilkie Collins and nineteenth-century art. She enjoys looking at paintings and the plot of Jerome and the Seraph is arranged around a painting by Sir John Roddam Spencer Stanhope called "Thoughts of the Past".

Williams has been a schoolteacher, college lecturer, journalist and secretary.

== Works ==
=== Fiction ===
- Jerome and the Seraph (2004)
- Angelos (2006)
