= Russell Mardell =

Russell Mardell (born 25 September 1975 in Cambridge, Cambridgeshire) is an English writer and film maker.

== Biography ==
Mardell is a playwright, scriptwriter and filmmaker. His stage plays include Cool Blokes: Decent Suits. which was first performed at the Old Red Lion Theatre in London in 2002, The Seventeenth Valentine. which premiered at the White Bear Theatre in London in 2008, and Freestate, which was performed at The White Bear Theatre and at Sunshine Studios in Manchester.

In 2010 he published his first collection of short stories, Silent Bombs Falling on Green Grass. In 2012 his first full novel Stone Bleeding was published. In 2013 his third book, Bleeker Hill, a dystopian horror novel was published. Between April and September 2014, Darkshines Seven (a sequel to Bleeker Hill) was released in three parts. In 2015, it was re-released as a single volume. In 2016, Mardell published Cold Calling, a romance comedy based on his play of the same name.
