= Margaret Murphy (writer) =

British crime writer (born 1959)

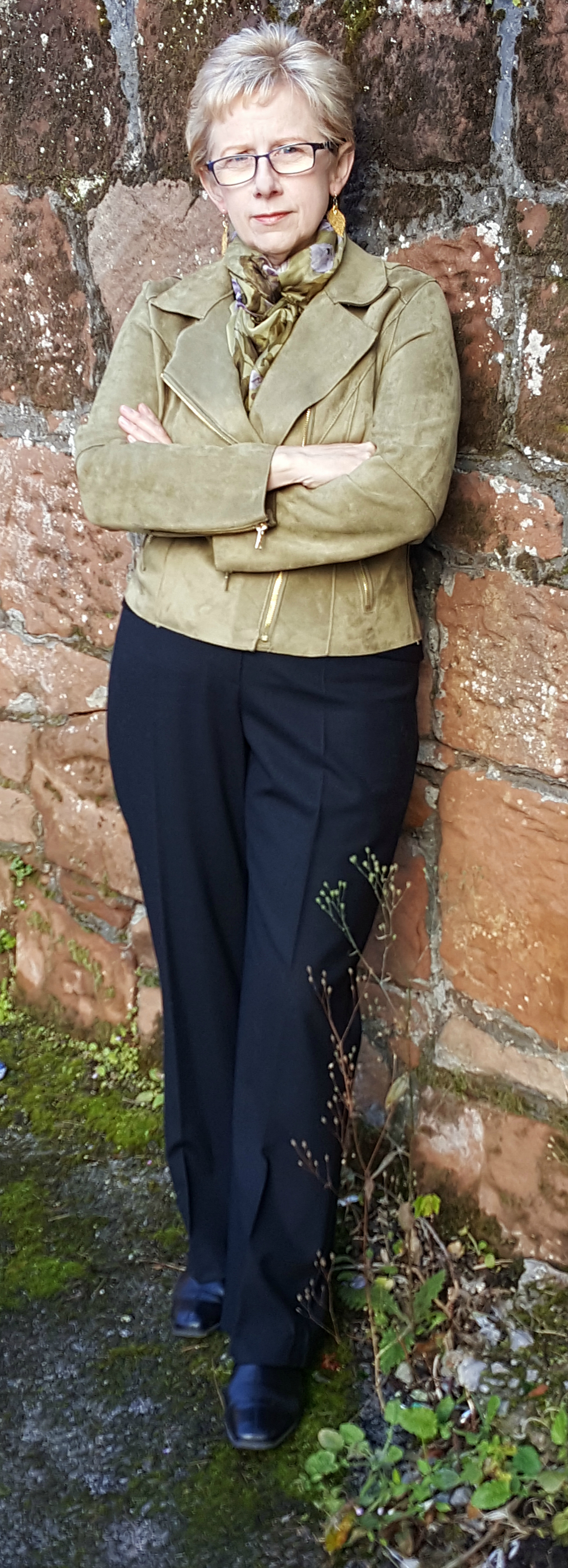
- Born: 14 April 1959 (age 67)
- Education: Liverpool JMU (M.A.)
- Known for: British crime writer

Margaret Murphy (born 14 April 1959) is a British crime writer.

== Biography ==
Margaret Murphy was born and brought up in Liverpool, Lancashire where she gained a degree in Environmental Biology at the University of Liverpool and later an MA with Distinction in Writing at Liverpool JMU, a course on which she lectured for several years. She has been a countryside ranger, science teacher, dyslexia specialist and psychology student.

After a string of successful stand-alone novels and a duology featuring Chester-based lawyer, Clara Pascal, Murphy began her first series with The Dispossessed which was followed by Now You See Me, featuring detectives Jeff Rickman, Lee Foster and Naomi Hart. The third in the series will be published in 2020. The Clara Pascal books, Darkness Falls and Weaving Shadows received starred reviews from both Publishers’ Weekly and Booklist in the USA. Writing in Crime Fiction, A Reader's Guide, Barry Forshaw said, 'Margaret Murphy writes with textual immediacy, creating complex plots peopled by sensitively drawn, flawed and believable characters.'

Her novels have garnered critical acclaim on both sides of the Atlantic with The New York Times describing her prose as "skin-chilling". Short-listed for the First Blood Award and the Crime Writers' Association's "Dagger in the Library", Murphy is the founder of "Murder Squad" – a touring group of crime writers – which celebrated its 20th year in 2020. She is a past Chair of the Crime Writers' Association and Chair of the CWA Debut Dagger; in recognition of her service to the association, she was awarded a "Red Herring".

In June 2013 she published Everyone Lies under the pseudonym of AD Garrett, which received a Publishers Weekly starred review, as did the sequel, Believe No One. Truth Will Out completed the trilogy. Murphy appeared on the BBC Breakfast programme to talk about Everyone Lies and her collaboration with Professor Dave Barclay, a forensic scientist, who advised on the science and forensic aspects of the first two novels.

In 2017, Murphy accomplished a long-held ambition to write a serial killer novel, Splinter In The Blood, which was published under the pen name Ashley Dyer and received a starred review from Publishers Weekly in the US, where it was published by William Morrow. The sequel, The Cutting Room, was released in the USA in June 2019, and in the UK in 2020.

Murphy has been a contributor to both BBC Radio Merseyside's Drive Time and Radio 4's The Message.

== Bibliography ==
=== Novels ===
Margaret Murphy novels

- Before He Kills Again (2020), Joffe Books (A Detective Cassie Rowan novel)
- Now You See Me (2005), Hodder (a Rickman and Foster novel) Relaunched as See Her Die (2020) by Joffe Books
- The Dispossessed (Nov 2004), Hodder & Stoughton (a Rickman and Foster novel) Relaunched as See Her Burn (2020) by Joffe Books
- Weaving Shadows (2003), Hodder & Stoughton (Clara Pascal 2)
- Darkness Falls (2002), Hodder & Stoughton (Clara Pascal 1)
- Dying Embers (2000), Macmillan
- Past Reason (1999), Macmillan
- Caging the Tiger (1998), Macmillan
- Desire of the Moth (1997), Macmillan
- Goodnight, My Angel (1996), Macmillan Relaunched as Dear Mum (2020) by Joffe Books

'Ashley Dyer' novels

- The Cutting Room (2019) - written as Ashley Dyer, William Morrow (Lake & Carver 2)
- Splinter in the Blood (2018) - written as Ashley Dyer, Corsair (Lake & Carver 1)

'A.D. Garrett' novels

- Truth Will Out (2016) - written as AD Garrett, Corsair (Simms & Fennimore 3)
- Believe No One (2014) - written as AD Garrett, Corsair ((Simms & Fennimore 2)
- Everyone Lies (2013) - written as AD Garrett, Constable (Simms & Fennimore 1)

=== Short fiction (all published under Margaret Murphy's own name) ===
- Port Lion (2015) in Starlings and Other Stories Murder Squad Anthology, Graffeg
- The Message, (2011) in Best Eaten Cold and other stories, Murder Squad Anthology, The Mystery Press
- Low Visibility (2008)
- False Light (2006) in Ellery Queen Magazine
- Epiphany (2006) in Ellery Queen Magazine
- False Light (2004) in Liverpool Stories, Comma Press
- Big End Blues and A Certain Resolution (2001) in Murder Squad Anthology, Flambard

Awards and shortlistings

- Goodnight My Angel was shortlisted for the First Blood critics award for crime fiction, 1996
- Shortlisted for the CWA Dagger In The Library (2006)
- Red Herring Award for service to the Crime Writers' Association (2009)
- The Message was awarded the CWA Short Story Dagger (2012)
