= Celia Dale =

English author and book reviewer (1912–2011)

Celia Dale (15 January 1912 – 31 December 2011), was an English author and book reviewer.

== Family ==
Both Celia Dale's parents were actors – her father was the noted stage and television actor James Dale (1887–1985), her mother Marguerite Adamson. She was a cousin of the novelist Sarah Harrison. She was married to the journalist and critic Guy Ramsey, until his death in 1959.

== Work ==
During the 30s and 40s, until her first pregnancy and first novel, she was secretary for nine years to the Daily Express editor Arthur Christiansen. Her novel Trial of Strength (1955) about a Fleet Street journalist drew upon this experience. She also worked as a secretary to the author Rumer Godden.

Celia Dale's first novel, The Least Of These, was published in 1943 and she went on to write twelve more and a volume of short stories. Her later novels were psychological thrillers. She won several awards, including the Crime Writers' Association Best Short Story of the Year award for Lines of Communication and A Personal Call and other stories in 1986. In 2008, four of her novels were reissued as Faber Finds. Five of her books are currently in print with Daunt Books Publishers.

Celia Dale died on 31 December 2011, at age 99.

== Bibliography ==
- The Least of These (1944)
- To Hold the Mirror (1946)
- The Dry Land (1952)
- The Wooden O (1953)
- Trial of Strength (1955)
- A Spring of Love (1960)
- Other People (1964)
- A Helping Hand (1966)
- Act of Love (1969)
- A Dark Corner (1971)
- The Innocent Party (1973)
- Helping with Enquiries (1979, aka The Deception)
- A Personal Call and Other Stories (1986)
- Sheep's Clothing (1988)

== Short stories ==
- The Scream. The Bystander, 25 August 1937
- Dy Pzycz. The Bystander, 3 November 1937
- The Christmas Spirit: A Spinster Takes a Chance. The Bystander, Christmas Number 1937
- The Moment of Truth. The Bystander, 9 February 1938
- Letter to the Editor. The Bystander, 8 June 1938
- Women Don't Understand. Belfast Telegraph, 18 June 1938
- Fireworks in December. The Bystander, 25 November 1938
- For Hecuba. The Evening Standard, 29 April 1938
- Madame Mantis. The Queen, 15 November 1939 (A Personal Call and Other Stories, 1986)
- The Funny Side. The Sphere, 22 November 1939 (A Personal Call and Other Stories, 1986)
- Local Boy. Argosy (UK), August 1943
- A Day Like Any Other. The Sketch, 20 February 1946 (A Personal Call and Other Stories, 1986)
- Into the Desert. The Cornhill Magazine, Summer 1956 (A Personal Call and Other Stories, 1986)
- Trumpets Off. The Cornhill Magazine, Summer 1957
- Something to Take Back. Winter's Tales 12, ed. A. D. Maclean, Macmillan, 1966 (A Personal Call and Other Stories, 1986)
- What's to Become of the Pussies?. Winter's Crimes 1, ed. George Hardinge, Macmillan, 1969 (A Personal Call and Other Stories, 1986)
- Juno's Swans. Winter's Crimes 4, ed. George Hardinge, Macmillan, 1972 (A Personal Call and Other Stories, 1986)
- Coming South. Winter's Crimes 5, ed. Virginia Whitaker, Macmillan, 1973 (A Personal Call and Other Stories, 1986)
- The Better Part of Valour. Winter's Tales 21, ed. A. D. Maclean, Macmillan, 1975 (A Personal Call and Other Stories, 1986)
- A Natural Death. Homes and Gardens 1976 (A Personal Call and Other Stories, 1986)
- A Personal Call. Winter's Crimes 9, ed. George Hardinge, Macmillan, 1977 (A Personal Call and Other Stories, 1986)
- Taking Care. Alfred Hitchcock's Mystery Magazine, April 1978
- Tenants. The Midnight Ghost Book, ed. James Hale, Barrie & Jenkins, 1978 (A Personal Call and Other Stories, 1986)
- Black Museum. Winter's Crimes 12, ed. Hilary Watson, Macmillan, 1980 (A Personal Call and Other Stories, 1986)
- Good Investments. The Mystery Guild Anthology, ed. John Waite, Constable, 1980 (A Personal Call and Other Stories, 1986)
- Moon Daisy. The After Midnight Ghost Book, ed. James Hale, Hutchinson, 1980 (A Personal Call and Other Stories, 1986)
- The Listening. Alfred Hitchcock's Mystery Magazine, July 22 1981
- What a Treasure!. Ellery Queen's Mystery Magazine, September 9 1981
- Old Tom. Winter's Tales 27, ed. Edward Leeson, Macmillan, 1981 (A Personal Call and Other Stories, 1986)
- Faery Tale. Winter's Crimes 15, ed. George Hardinge, Macmillan, 1983
- Business Lunch. John Creasey's Crime Collection 1985, ed. Herbert Harris, Gollancz, 1985 (A Personal Call and Other Stories, 1986)
- Kindness. Winter's Crimes 17, ed. George Hardinge, Macmillan, 1985
- Lines of Communication. A Personal Call and Other Stories, Constable & Company, 1986
- Wednesday Matinée. A Classic English Crime, ed. Tim Heald, Pavilion, 1990

== Adaptations ==
- 'Letter To The Editor' - Wednesday Matinee, BBC Home Service, 8 February 1950
- 'The Funny Side' - Saturday Matinee, BBC Home Service, 25 June 1955
- A Spring of Love - ITV Play of the Week, 31 January 1961
- A Helping Hand - The Wednesday Play: A Way with the Ladies, BBC One, 10 May 1967
- Act of Love - Saturday-Night Theatre, BBC Radio 4, 3 April 1971
- A Spring of Love, BBC One, as a four-part drama, Love Story: Mr Right, which aired in 1983.

=== Serialised narration ===
- A Spring of Love (nine instalments) Woman's Hour, May – June 1961
- A Helping Hand (ten instalments) Woman's Hour, March 1971
- Sheep's Clothing (ten instalments) Woman's Hour, December 1988
