= Stephen Elboz =

Stephen Elboz (born 1956) is the writer of the children's books The Byzantium Bazaar and A Land without Magic.

== Background ==
Born in 1956 in Wellingborough, Northants, England, where he still lives, Elboz wrote his first novel in secret at his junior school in Wellingborough.

Encouragement from teachers made him continue to write, although he only left school with only a single O-Level in technical drawing. Later educated at Lancaster University, he won a writing competition and had a play produced on the local radio station.

Elboz was awarded the Smarties Young Judges' Prize for his first published novel, The House of Rats.

== Books ==
- The House of Rats (1991)
- The Games Board Map (1993)
- Bottle Boy (1994)
- The Byzantium Bazaar (1996)
- Ghostlands (1996)
- Temmi and the Flying Bears (1998)
- The Tower at Moonville (1999)
- A Handful of Magic (2000)
- A Land Without Magic (2001)
- A Wild Kind of Magic (2001)
- Temmi and the Frost Dragon (2002)
- An Ocean of Magic (2003)
