= Edith Spicer Jay =

- Born: 6 March 1847; London
- Died: 3 December 1901 (aged 54); Sandgate
- Occupation: Writer
- Writing career
- Pen name: E. Livingston Prescott
- Subject: Novels with flawed heroes in the military

Edith Katherine Spicer Jay publishing as "E. Livingston Prescott" (6 March 1847 – 3 December 1901) was a British writer and philanthropist.

== Life ==
Jay was born in London in 1847. Her parents were Elizabeth Maria Jane (born Spicer) and Samuel Jay. Her father was a barrister, but her antecedents were known particularly for careers in the military. She had notable heroes on her fathers and her mothers family tree.

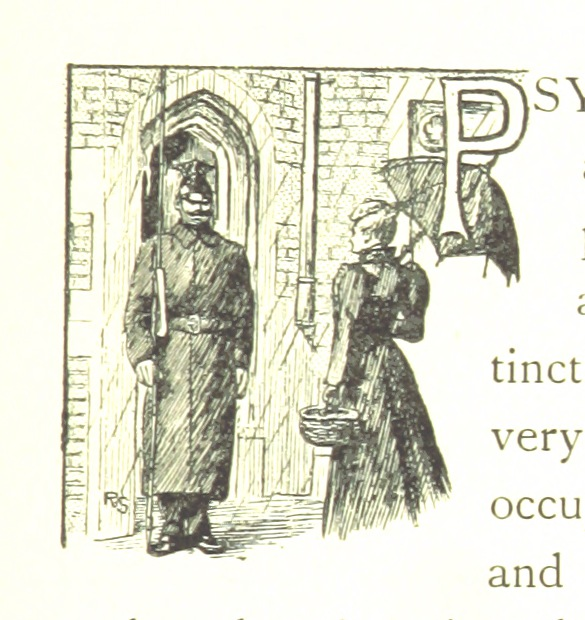
from "Red-Coat Romances" by E. Livingston Prescott

Jay wrote eighteen novels involving flawed heroes set in the military. She chose a name that was ambiguous in regard to her gender and most people assumed that she was a man. The name she chose was E. Livingstone Prescott and this was built from the notable men in her family tree. Her great uncle was Major Alexander Livingston who had won medals in the Peninsular Wars. On her mother's side her grandfather was Colonel Spicer who was a lieutenant-colonel in the Queen's Bays, but the name "Prescott" came from the Prescott baronets as she was related to Sir George Prescott.

Her novels included "The Measure of a Man", "A Soldier's Story Or The Rip's Redemption", "Red Coat Romances" and "The Apotheosis Of Mr. Tyrawley". It was noted that the books tended to frequently include descriptions of the flogging and punishment of military prisoners.

Jay used some of the money from her writing to support charities. One was the Home for Incurables in Streatham Common which is now known as the "British Home". She was also the unpaid Superindendant of the London Soldiers' Home and the Guards' Home while her health allowed.

Jay died in Sandgate in 1901 after a decade at her home with rheumatoid arthritis. She was held in high regard and despite it not being usually permitted she was buried with full military honours at Shorncliffe camp. She had been friendly with the soldiers at the camp. Two of them were her executors and they supervised several charitable donations on her behalf.

== Note ==
It has been assumed that another of her nom-de-plumes was "L. Parry Hargreaves". But this was the assumed name of Abbie Hargrave (1871–1936).
