= Robert Black (author) =

British author, journalist and translator

- Born: 14 May 1829; London, England
- Died: 8 April 1915 (aged 85); London, England
- Occupations: Author, journalist and translator
- Writing career
- Period: 1861–1893

Robert Black (1829–1915) was a British author of fiction and non-fiction, as well as a journalist and translator. He is chiefly remembered for his works on horse racing and for a translation of François Guizot's Popular History of France, his most successful work.

== Life and education ==
Black was born on 14 May 1829 in London, England, the second son of Robert Black, a clerk of the same city. He finished schooling at Christ's Hospital in 1848, and was admitted to Pembroke College at Cambridge University on 24 June 1848 at the age of 19. He took his B.A. in 1852 and M.A. in 1856. During his last years he lived a life of seclusion in London, where he died on 8 April 1915.

== Career ==
Cover of the second edition of Love or Lucre, George Routledge and Sons, 1879

Black commenced his writing career as a classical scholar who produced articles on current affairs and the Italian Renaissance, and translations of French works. His translation of Guizot went through numerous editions in England and America.

He started contributing fiction to such periodicals as the Cornhill Magazine, Macmillan's Magazine and Chambers' Journal in the 1860s. His work also appeared in the Athenaeum and The Field. Black's early short stories were gathered into two collections, after which he attempted a novel, Love or Lucre, published by Richard Bentley & Son in 1878. A protracted dispute over Bentley's editorial practices appears to have soured him on fiction, and though another short story collection and novel were projected nothing came of these efforts.

Black later achieved some success as an authority on horse racing, contributing articles on the subject to the St. James Gazette, the Pall Mall Gazette, The Times, and The Sportsman, and three books, the third of which was again published by Bentley.

== Bibliography ==
=== Fiction ===
==== Novels ====
- Love or Lucre (Richard Bentley & Son, 1878) (Internet Archive e-text)

==== Collections ====
- The Blackbird of Baden and Other Stories (Sampson Low, Son, & Marston, 1869)
- Lady Caroline, with Pendants (Smith, Elder & Co., 1873)

==== Short stories ====
Incomplete listing, based largely on the contents of The Blackbird of Baden and Lady Caroline.

- "Bar One" (from Chambers' Journal, 4th Series 9, 6 Jan.-28 Dec. 1872; reprinted in Lady Caroline)
- "Betwixt Two Stools" (reprinted in Lady Caroline)
- "The Black Doll" (from Chambers' Journal, 4th Series 11, 3 Jan.-26 Dec. 1874)
- "The Blackbird of Baden" (reprinted in The Blackbird of Baden)
- "The Fatal Bouquet" (from Chambers' Journal, 4th Series 7, 1 Jan.-31 Dec. 1870; reprinted in Lady Caroline)
- "Fifty Brides" (from The Cornhill Magazine, Apr. 1868; reprinted in Lady Caroline)
- "Friends and Rivals" (reprinted in The Blackbird of Baden)
- "How Robinson Lost His Fellowship" (from Chambers' Journal, 4th Series 8, 7 Jan.-30 Dec. 1871; reprinted in Lady Caroline)
- "Lady Caroline" (from The Cornhill Magazine, Sep. 1870; reprinted in Lady Caroline)
- "The Lily of the Alley" (from Chambers' Journal, 4th Series 11, 3 Jan.-26 Dec. 1874)
- "Married Well" (from Chambers' Journal, 4th Series 4, 5 Jan.-28 Dec. 1867; reprinted in The Blackbird of Baden)
- "Mr Drumfich's Story" (from Chambers' Journal, Extra New Year's Double Number 1864)
- "An Odd Shaver" (from Chambers' Journal, 4th Series 1, 2 Jan.-31 Dec. 1864; reprinted in Lady Caroline)
- "Off the Scent" (reprinted in Lady Caroline)
- "The Pretty Butcheress" (from Chambers' Journal, 4th Series 5, 4 Jan.-26 Dec. 1868; reprinted in The Blackbird of Baden)
- "Rather an Adventure—for an Undergraduate" (from Chambers' Journal, 4th Series 6, 2 Jan.-25 Dec. 1869; reprinted in Lady Caroline)
- "The Red Nose" (from Chambers' Journal, 4th Series 6, 2 Jan.-25 Dec. 1869; reprinted in Lady Caroline)
- "Stubbs's Luck" (from Chambers' Journal, 4th Series 6, 2 Jan.-25 Dec. 1869; reprinted in Lady Caroline)
- "Two Turnings to the Right" (reprinted in The Blackbird of Baden)
- "An Unexpected Blessing" (from Chambers' Journal, 4th Series 1, 2 Jan.-31 Dec. 1864; reprinted in The Blackbird of Baden)
- "The Verdict Against J. J." (reprinted in The Blackbird of Baden)
- "Very Extraordinary" (from Chambers' Journal, 3rd Series 16, 6 July-28 Dec. 1861)
- "The Wrong Pillar-box" (from Chambers' Journal, 4th Series 11, 3 Jan.-26 Dec. 1874)

=== Non-fiction ===
- A Memoir of Abraham Lincoln, President-Elect of the United States of America (Sampson Low, Son & Co., 1861) (Internet Archive e-text)
- Horse-Racing in France: A History (Low, Marston, Searle & Rivington, 1886) (Google Books e-text)
- The Jockey Club and Its Founders, in Three Periods (Smith, Elder, 1891) (Internet Archive e-text)
- Horse-Racing in England: A Synoptical Review (Richard Bentley & Son, 1893) (Internet Archive e-text)

=== Translations ===
- Juste, Théodore. Memoirs of Leopold I, King of the Belgians (Sampson, Low & Marston, 1868) (Internet Archive e-text of v. 1; Internet Archive e-text of v. 2)
- Guizot, François. A Popular History of France from the Earliest Times (S. Low, Marston, Low & Searle, 1872, from Histoire de France racontée à mes petits enfants, 1869) (Internet Archive e-text)
- Sandeau, Jules. Seagull Rock (1872) (Google Books e-text)
- Cicero. Death No Bane: a New Translation, With Copious Illustrative Notes, of Cicero's First Tusculan Disputation (Sampson, Low, Marston, Searle, & Rivington, 1889) (Google Books e-text)
