= Bilton Grange (disambiguation) =

Bilton Grange may refer to:

- Bilton Grange, a preparatory school located in Dunchurch, Warwickshire.
- Bilton Grange Senior High School, former school in Kingston upon Hull
- Bilton Grange Estate - Hull Corporation built housing estate in Kingston upon Hull
