= Theresa Tomlinson =

English writer of children's books

- Born: 14 August 1946 (age 80); Crawley, Sussex, England
- Education: Hull College of Education
- Occupation: writer
- Spouse: Alan Tomlinson (1967–present)
- Children: 3
- Website: www.theresatomlinson.com

Theresa Tomlinson (born 1946 in Crawley, Sussex) is an English writer for children, mainly of historical fiction. She advocates giving children "the opportunity to consider many different role models and ways of life, so that they can make up their own minds about what is right for them." Her Forestwife trilogy is a retelling of the Robin Hood legend focused on Maid Marian.

== Life and work ==
The daughter of Alan and Joan Johnston, she lived as a child in Cleveland and North Yorkshire, where her father was an Anglican vicar. She attended Hull College of Art and later Hull College of Education. Tomlinson spent much of her married life in Sheffield, and it was there, as she began to tell stories to her three children, that she began to enjoy writing. She especially likes working on historical fiction.

Now a grandmother, she lives in Whitby with her husband. In recent years she has been particularly interested in the Anglo-Saxon period. She is a member of the National Association of Writers in Education and the British Society of Authors.

Tomlinson's Forestwife trilogy (The Forestwife (1993), Child of the May (1998) and The Path of the She Wolf (2000)) is a retelling of the Robin Hood legend focused on Maid Marian.

Tomlinson's novel Better Than Gold focuses on the life of King Penda of Mercia.

== Reception ==
Reviewing Tomlinson's first novel, The Flither Pickers (1987), about the hard lives of Yorkshire fishermen's wives, the magazine Junior Bookshelf called it "a most distinguished novel which is also a convincing piece of historical reconstruction."

Summer Witches (1991) is a young-adult novel addressing the way powerful women are misunderstood. The Horn Book Magazine review by Martha V. Parravano forecast that "middle-grade girls will be hooked immediately by the private hideaway with a sense of mystery surrounding it," and by Tomlinson's tale, which "unfolds, living up to its enticing premise."

The Forestwife (1993) was praised by the US Publishers Weekly for portraying Maid Marian as "more than a glorified moll to the Merry Men," but the reviewer noted also "a heavy-handed and somewhat self-righteous social agenda" that eclipsed the story-telling.

Completion of the Forestwife Trilogy (with Child of the May, 1998, and Path of the She-Wolf, 2000) led to a 2001 interview with Allen W. Wright, in which Tomlinson looked beyond story-telling to argue that young people should "read widely and have the opportunity to consider many different role models and ways of life, so that they can make up their own minds about what is right for them." She said also that she found the traditional role of Marian in literature "boring", although she made an exception for Rosemary Sutcliff's treatment. The trilogy was reissued in paperback in 2003.

Tomlinson suffered from breast cancer and drew on that experience in Dancing Through the Shadows (1997). Five of her children's adventure stories explore time slips (1997–2004). Greek mythology provides the background for the young-adult novel The Moon Riders (2002) and its sequel The Voyage of the Snake Lady (2004).

== Influences ==
Tomlinson told an English Association interview that her favourite childhood books were The Lion, the Witch and the Wardrobe by C. S. Lewis and Frances Hodgson Burnett's The Secret Garden In adulthood she became attracted to the work of Alan Garner and Jane Gardam.

== Bibliography ==
=== Fiction series ===
==== Against the Tide trilogy ====
1. The Flither Pickers (1987)
2. The Herring Girls (1994)
3. Beneath Burning Mountain (2001)

==== Forestwife trilogy ====
1. The Forestwife (1993)
2. Child of the May (1998)
3. The Path of the She Wolf (2000)

==== Time Slip adventures ====
- Meet Me by the Steelmen (1997)
- The Night of the Red Devil (2000)
- Errand Lass (2003)
- Scavenger Boy (2003)
- Blitz Baby (2004)

==== Troy and the Warrior Women series ====
1. The Moon Riders (2002)
2. The Voyage of the Snake Lady (2004)

=== Novels ===
- Water Cat (1988)
- The Secret Place (1990)
- Riding the Waves (1990)
- Summer Witches (1991)
- The Rope Carrier (1991)
- The Cellar Lad (1995)
- Haunted House Blues (1996)
- Dancing Through the Shadows (1997)
- The Little Stowaway (1997)
- Ironstone Valley (1998)
- Lifeboat That Went by Land (1999)
- The Voyage of the Silver Bream (2001)
- Wolf Girl (2006)
- Viva Espana (2010)
- A Swarming of Bees (2012)
- Better Than Gold (2014)
- Queen of a Distant Hive (2017)
- Forged in Steel (2020)
