= Paige Toon =

Australian-American-English author

Paige Toon is an author who grew up in Australia, United States and England following her father's career as a race car driver meant she grew up all over the world. Paige worked at Heat magazine for eight years as Reviews Editor, but left to have a baby. She is now a full-time author and freelance journalist and lives in Cambridge with her husband Greg, an architect, son Indy and daughter Idha.

She has 18 novels to her name in the romance genre, three young adult novels (the Jessie Jefferson series) and three e-novellas. Her most recent novels include 'Only Love Can Hurt Like This' released in 2023, 'Seven Summers' released in 2024 and 'What If I Never Get Over You' released in 2025.

== Life and career ==
Toon attended Mount Barker High School in Adelaide, Australia and then Altwood School back in Maidenhead, England. She graduated from the University of Greenwich.

In October 2025, Toon was a guest on the Off the Shelf podcast.

== Bibliography ==
=== Novels ===
- Lucy in the Sky (2007)
- Johnny Be good (2008)
- Chasing Daisy (2009)
- Pictures of Lily (2010)
- Baby Be Mine (2011)
- One Perfect Summer (2012)
- The Longest Holiday (2013)
- Thirteen Weddings (2014)
- The Sun in Her Eyes (2015)
- The One We Fell in Love With ( 2016)
- The Last Piece of My Heart (2017)
- Five Years From Now (2018)
- If You Could Go Anywhere (2019)
- The Minute I Saw You (2020)
- Someone I Used To Know (2021)
- Only Love Can Hurt Like This (2023)
- Seven Summers (2024)
- What If I Never Get Over You (2025)
- Don't Fall in Love With Me (2026)
- We Only Have The Summer (2027)

=== Young Adult Series ===
- The Accidental Life of Jessie Jefferson (2014)
- I Knew You Were Trouble (2015)
- All About the Hype (2016)

=== E-Book short stories ===
- One Perfect Christmas (2012)
- Johnny's Girl (2013)
- A Christmas Wedding (2017)

=== Short story collection ===
- One Perfect Christmas and Other Stories (2018)
