= Sarah Pitt =

English children's author, fl. 1881–1900

- Occupation: author

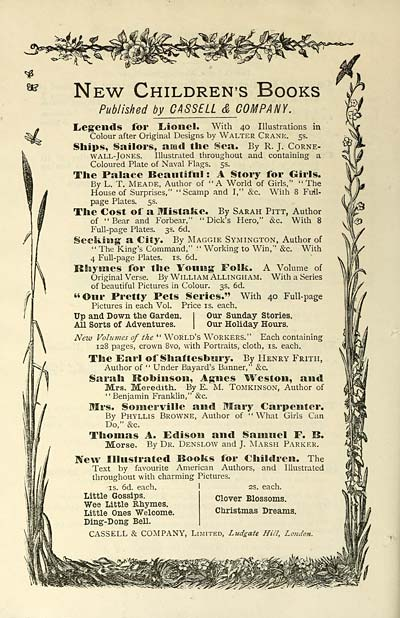
Annual. Published 1887-1894. Occasionally published by: P. & D. Lyle. Also known as: Dalkeith district directory and household almanac. Followed by: Carment's directory for Dalkeith and district and year book.

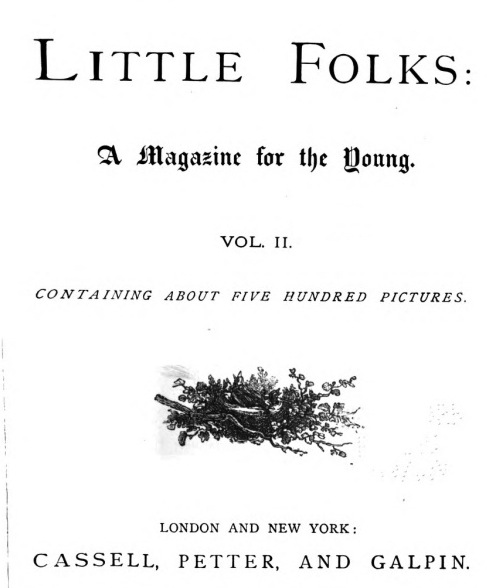
Front page of Little Folks periodical from 1872.

Sarah Pitt was a 19th-century English children's author. She wrote several children's novels published by Cassell and Co., during a period of activity between 1881 and 1900. In addition she provided several short stories for the publication Little Folks, a "magazine for the young" which was also published by Cassell.

== Novels ==
Reviews in the Spectator magazine in November 1886 described Sarah Pitt's novel Bear and Forbear as "one of the good things of the year." In 1891 it praised The White House at Inch Gow as "a quite harmless story, prettily told".

Pitt's second novel, Fritters: or, 'It's a Long Lane that has no Turning' appeared in 1885 in the "Proverbs" series: "original stories by popular authors founded upon and illustrating well-known proverbs". It is a "bad-boy-turns-good" story, in which didacticism is accompanied by a realistic narrative, set in the London Docklands.

The White House at Inch Gow and A Limited Success have been reprinted in the British Library Historical Print editions series.

== List of works ==
- Dick's Hero, and Other Stories, 1881
- Fritters, or, "It's a Long Lane that has no Turning", 1885
- Bear and Forbear, 1886, illustrated by P. McNab
- White House at Inch Gow, 1891, illustrated by John Henry Frederick Bacon
- The Cost of a Mistake, 1897, illustrated by Hal Ludlow, i. e. Henry Stephen Ludlow
- A Limited Success, 1897
- Peggy Price's Luck, 1899
- A Pair of Primroses, 1900
