= Sarah Harrison (novelist) =

English novelist and children's writer, born 1946

Sarah Harrison (born 1946) is an English novelist and children's writer. She has written successful novels and children's books, and also a writers' guide: How to Write a Blockbuster.

== Family and life ==
Born in Exeter, Sarah Harrison is the second of three children of an army officer and a former actress, and a cousin of the novelist Celia Dale. The family spent time during her childhood in Berlin, Singapore, Malaya, then Germany again, before she was sent to boarding school at the age of nine. She took an English degree at the University of London and then worked for four years on the magazine Woman's Own, before becoming a freelance writer.

Harrison married for a second time in 2003. She has three grown-up children and six grandchildren. She is President of Morden and District Writers' Circle and a member of the Morden Players drama group, both based in Steeple Morden, Cambridgeshire, where she lives.

== Writings ==
=== Novels ===
- A Flower that's Free, 1984
- Flowers of the Field, 1980
- Hot Breath, 1985
- An Imperfect Lady, 1988
- Cold Feet, 1989
- The Forests of the Night, 1991
- Foreign Parts, 1992
- Be an Angel, 1993
- Both Your Houses, 1995
- Life after Lunch, 1996
- Flowers won't Fax, 1997
- That Was Then, 1998
- Heaven's on Hold, 1999
- The Divided Heart, 2002
- The Grass Memorial, 2002
- A Dangerous Thing, 2002
- The Dreaming Stones, 2003
- Swan Music, 2005
- The Next Room, 2005
- The Nightingale's Nest, 2006
- The Red Dress, 2006
- A Spell of Swallows, 2007
- The Hawk, ?
- Rose Petal Soup, 2008
- Matters Arising, 2009
- Returning the Favour, 2010
- Secrets of our Hearts, 2011
- The Wildflower Path, 2013
- All the Things, 2016
- The Rose in Winter, 2017
- Heart's Ease, 2019

=== Children's books ===
- In Granny's Garden, 1980
- Laura and Old Lumber, 1986
- Laura and Edmund, 1986
- Laura and the Squire, 1986
- Laura and the Lady, 1986

=== Non-fiction ===
- How to Write a Blockbuster, 1995

== Other work ==
- Contribution to the Sexy Shorts short story collection.
- A regular contributor to the BBC Radio 4 discussion programme Stop the Week.
