= Alan Bilton =

British academic and novelist

Alan Bilton is a British academic and novelist. His debut novel, The Sleepwalker's Ball, was published in May 2009 by the small independent Welsh press Alcemi. As an academic working for the American Studies department of the University of Wales, Swansea, his areas of expertise and interest are 20th-century / Contemporary American Fiction, American Film (especially Silent Cinema), Modernism, Postmodernism and Psychoanalysis (particularly the works and theories of Sigmund Freud).

== Personal life and academic career ==
Bilton was born in York in 1969. He attended Stirling University in the late 1980s to study for his undergraduate bachelor's degree in English and Film in 1991. It was his time at Stirling that he was to draw upon for inspiration for his first novel, remarking in a 2009 interview that:

"I went there this rather backwards, lazy, dreamy, um, idiot really, and I found out so much – all sorts of European films, modern art, books that seemed to have been written with me especially in mind. But at the same time, I was there in the late eighties and the town itself was very run-down, depressed, violent at the edges. It was the era of Thatcher and the Poll Tax, and there was real anti-student, anti-English feeling – so there I was, feeding my head with all these incredible arty things, and there was this working-class town mired in depression and unemployment, an almost overwhelming sense of greyness and lethargy. And this was a source of real tension... I was watching a lot of European movies – all the New Wave films, especially Truffaut who's also quite light-hearted about very sad things – and reading a lot of East European fiction too – the late eighties were a golden age for translated fiction from the old Soviet bloc, what with the wall about to fall. Thus I loved all those Czechs – Milan Kundera, Josef Skvorecky, especially Bohumil Hrabal – who took depressing Soviet reality and transformed it into something surreal, playful and alive."

Upon completing his bachelor's degree at Stirling, Bilton moved on to the University of Manchester where he completed his PhD on 'Word and Image in The Novels of Don DeLillo' in 1995, after initially starting a project on Kurt Vonnegut and changing his mind midway through researching it. He joined the American Studies Department at the University of Wales, Swansea in 1996. After twelve years with the department, he was made deputy head of the department in 2008 as it was merged into the broader spectrum of the department for International Relations. In 2010, with the downsizing of the American Studies department as part of a wider shakeup of the humanities at Swansea, Bilton has recently begun a move to the English department, in which he will teach literature and creative writing modules while still doing occasional American Studies modules in cinema and contemporary American fiction. However, with the future of the American Studies department still uncertain, there is every possibility that Bilton will continue to moonlight as a lecturer and marker for the department.

Among the writers Bilton teaches in his Contemporary American Fiction class are Cormac McCarthy, Douglas Coupland, Paul Auster, Junot Díaz, Jonathan Safran Foer, and Jennifer Egan.

== The Sleepwalker's Ball ==
Bilton's debut novel, The Sleepwalkers' Ball, was officially launched on 29 April 2009 at the smallest cinema in Wales, La Charrette at the Gower Heritage Centre, Park Mill. Readings from the book were accompanied by two silent Buster Keaton films: The High Sign and Sherlock Junior. DM Thomas, author of The White Hotel, said of the novel: "Alan Bilton's artfully-interwoven narratives, part zany city guide, part silent film, creative an imaginative whole which is poetic, inventive, surprising and pulsating with life". The plot of the novel consists of "...four inter-connected stories, all set in the same strangely black and white Scottish town, and these stories gradually link up to tell a tragic-comic tale of lost love and the perils of dreaming."

Bilton describes the novel thus: "turn [ing] my own experiences into a kind of painting or a silent film or a poem...for me the town [in the novel] is Stirling in central Scotland where I was a student for four years and where an awful lot happened to me – falling in love, discovering art, movies, books – discovering the world really. And all this autobiographical stuff provides the real emotional colouring of the book."

== The Known and Unknown Sea ==
Following the publication of The Sleepwalker's Ball, Bilton's attention turned to ideas for a follow up. However, work on the novel was delayed while he worked towards completing Constantly Moving Happiness Machines: Silent Film Comedy & American Culture, an academic non-fiction book on "silent film comedy with chapters on all the key figures – Chaplin, Keaton, Fatty Arbuckle, Harry Langdon, Mabel Normand – connecting slapstick comedy to American culture in the 1920s, especially consumerism, mass consumption and the idea of Hollywood as the dream factory." However, by late August 2009, he was "20,000 words into the first draft" of his second novel. Limited details about the novel have emerged, including the title and some basic information about the plot, with its protagonist being a remarkably intelligent and precocious young child, and the novel being set in a mysterious coastal town opposite an island obscured in mist, from which no visitors have ever returned. There is currently no definite information regarding the novel's publication.

== Influences ==
Bilton largely draws upon the influence of silent film ("When I was little I loved Charlie Chaplin and Laurel and Hardy, and then later on I discovered Buster Keaton and Harold Lloyd and I adored them all."), Eastern European fiction and DM Thomas. However, when asked whether his academic work on American fiction feeds into his own fiction writing, and indeed whether he read much contemporary British fiction, he stated:

"I'm very, very fortunate these days to teach the things I like, so I guess I'm drawn to books and films that touch upon the things which mean the most to me. But I have written and studied all sorts of different things. My PhD thesis, for example, was on Don DeLillo, a writer who I think I have nothing in common with at all...The embarrassing truth is that I don't actually read much British fiction. I love Kazuo Ishiguro for his voice...Oh, and the much-maligned D.M. Thomas deserves some credit too, for The White Hotel and Freud and the idea of writing books that only deal with poetic intensity without all the mechanics of so-called believable realistic writing. But really, American and European sources inform the book much more than British ones. I unconsciously stole the idea of our hero unable to find his own home in 'Our Grand Tour' from Paul Auster's New York Trilogy and all the laundry and the spectral, ghostlike figures wandering the streets comes straight from Gogol. But film was just as important to the book – and silent film in particular."

== Bibliography ==
- An Introduction to Contemporary American Fiction (Edinburgh: Edinburgh University Press) US edition: (2003, New York: New York University Press).
- The American 1920s: Literary sources and Documents, Vol One: The Cultural Condition, Vol Two: Voices of Modernity, Vol Three: An Age of Performance (2004, Co-editor with Philip Melling, Robertsbridge: Helm Information).
- The Sleepwalkers' Ball (2009, Aberystwyth: Alcemi) debut novel
- Constantly Moving Happiness Machines: Silent Film Comedy & American Culture (Forthcoming; about silent film comedy in America)
- The Known and Unknown Sea (2014, Manchester : Cillian Press)
- Anywhere Out of the World (2016, Manchester : Cillian Press) short-story collection
- The End of the Yellow House (2020, Swansea: Watermark Press)
- At Dawn, Two Nightingales (2024, Swansea: Watermark Press)
