= The Moon Riders =

2002 novel by Theresa Tomlinson

- First edition
- Author: Theresa Tomlinson
- Language: English
- Series: Troy and the Warrior Women
- Genre: Historical novel
- Publisher: Corgi Books
- Publication date: 2002
- Publication place: United Kingdom
- Media type: Print (Paperback)
- ISBN: 0-09-942709-5
- Followed by: The Voyage of the Snake Lady

The Moon Riders is a young adult historical novel by Theresa Tomlinson, first published in 2002. There is also a second book in this series called The Voyage of the Snake Lady.

== Plot introduction ==
This story is about the Moon Riders, known historically as the Amazons. The main character is Myrina, who joins the Amazons in her teenage years and becomes one of the very prestigious moon dancers.

Myrina joins the Moon Riders when she is 14. She becomes friend and confidante to Cassandra the prophetic princess of Troy. As the 'Snake Lady' she acquires a gang of four young orphans who travel with her, until all but one have been killed.

== Family ==
Myrina is daughter to Gul and is the younger sister of Reseda. Later in the book she becomes aunt to Phoebe and Yildiz - who she adopts. She marries her childhood friend Tomi and has a baby girl by him. Tomi is killed while they lead the slaves away from Troy. Yildiz also dies, but she dies avenging her family's deaths, mainly that of her mother.

== Troy and the Warrior Women series ==
In writing The Moon Riders, Tomlinson drew on a mixture of Greek mythology, such as The Odyssey and The Iliad, as well as archaeological and historical works, such as a BBC2 Horizon programme called The Ice Maiden and Lyn Webster Wilde's book On the Trail of the Women Warriors.

The second book of the series, The Voyage of the Snake Lady, relates the tale of the now grown-up Myrina and her tribe of Moon Riders, many of whom are refugees from the slave pens of Troy. This story draws on the adventures of Herodotus in describing the fate of the Moon Riders, whilst also drawing on Euripides' Iphigenia in Tauris in order to continue Iphigenia's story. Tomlinson acknowledges in the Author's Note to this book that, whilst most accounts of the Trojan War have Cassandra taken by Agamemnon after the fall of Troy and then murdered by his wife, Clytemnestra, after his own death at her hands, an account by Dares the Phrygian sees her released by Agamemnon to live near Troy. This version, Tomlinson points out, was used by Chaucer for Troilus and Cressida This second book sees a definite future established for the Moon Riders, whilst re-establishing and strengthening the ties between Myrina, Cassandra, and Iphigenia.
