= Amanda Craig =

British novelist, critic and journalist

Amanda Craig FRSL
- Born: 1959 (age 66–67); South Africa
- Education: Clare College, Cambridge
- Occupations: Critic; Journalist

Amanda Craig (born 1959) is a British novelist, critic and journalist.

== Biography ==
Born in South Africa, Craig grew up in Italy before moving to London. Her parents were British journalist, author and UN Press Officer Dennis Craig, and South African journalist Zelda Wolhuter, who left Johannesburg following the Sharpeville Massacre and the rise of apartheid. Craig studied at Bedales School and read English Literature at Clare College, Cambridge. After graduation, she worked briefly in advertising for J. Walter Thompson and Terence Conran before leaving to work as a cleaner for 18 months. She then became a journalist.

She is married to economist Rob Cohen. They have two children. Craig, and her daughter Leon Craig, also a novelist, feature in John Self's article on literary families in The Guardian.

She was elected a Fellow of the Royal Society of Literature in 2018.

== Writing ==
Journalism

For ten years, she was the children's books critic for The Times and a features writer for The Sunday Times. She has contributed to The Observer, The Guardian, the New Statesman and BBC Radio 4. As a journalist, Craig won the British Press Awards 1995 Young Journalist of the Year and the 1997 Catherine Pakenham Award. She worked on the staff of Tatler and the Sunday Express before becoming a freelance feature writer, literary critic and columnist for The Daily Telegraph, The Sunday Times, the Daily Mail, The Independent and The Observer. She judged the Whitbread Novel Award in 2005, the Booktrust Teen Book Award in 2008, and the 2018 Wingate Prize. Craig was dropped as a judge for the Mslexia Fiction & Memoir Competition by women’s writing magazine Mslexia in September 2020 after she signed a letter to The Times condemning online abuse of J.K. Rowling.

Novels

Craig has written a cycle of eleven interconnected novels dealing with contemporary British society. Her 1996 novel A Vicious Circle was originally contracted to be published by Hamish Hamilton, but was cancelled after a libel threat from David Sexton, literary editor of the Evening Standard and former boyfriend of Craig's at Cambridge, fifteen years previously. The novel was bought by Fourth Estate and published three months later.

Although each novel can be read separately, they are linked to each other by common characters and themes, thus constituting a novel sequence. Craig has been described as a state-of-the-nation novelist by Sameer Rahim in Prospect and by The Sunday Times. Usually, Craig takes a minor character and makes him or her the protagonist of her next work. She has been praised by Allison Pearson in The Sunday Telegraph for her "...wit, indignation, an ear for the telling phrase and an unflagging attention to all the individual choices by which we define ourselves – where we stand as a society and how we decline and fall."

Craig's fourth novel, In a Dark Wood, concerned the interplay between fairytales and bipolar disorder, and her fifth, Love in Idleness, updates Shakespeare's A Midsummer Night's Dream, setting the story in a holiday villa near Cortona, Italy. Her sixth novel, Hearts and Minds, concerned with the lives of legal and illegal immigrants in London, was longlisted for the 2009 Baileys Women's Prize for Fiction.

Her seventh novel, The Lie of the Land (2017), which depicted a London professional couple who can't afford to divorce, and who move to Devon to a rented house which has been the scene of a murder, was described as "in the vanguard of the Brexit novel" by Danuta Kean in The Guardian. It was praised by Henry Hitchings in the Financial Times, who commented: "An enjoyable, sharp-witted and at times knowingly melodramatic novel, it lives up to the promise of its title – diagnosing the state of the nation without becoming grandiose, and debunking a few quaint myths about the patterns and textures of rural life." It was BBC Radio 4's Book at Bedtime in August 2017. The Guardian chose it as one of the 2017 Books of the Year, as did The Irish Times, The Financial Times, The Observer, and The Telegraph.

Craig has set two of her novels, A Private Place and The Lie of the Land, in Devon, a county that she has compared to C. S. Lewis's Narnia. In an interview with Jackie McGlone of The Glasgow Herald, Craig described how encountering the poverty of North Devon shocked her. Her eighth novel, The Golden Rule, was published in 2020 and was described as a "wry comedy-cum-thriller reimagining of Patricia Highsmith Strangers on a Train and Beauty and the Beast", "offering comfort and wit, compassion and philosophical speculation," although one critic commented of the millennial protagonist: "Craig’s language choices... make her seem weirdly prim. The Golden Rule was longlisted for the 2021 Women's Prize for fiction. Her ninth novel was The Three Graces (2023), described by The Telegraph as "smartly plotted but ultimately lightweight."

Craig is interested in fairytales and children's fiction, and was one of the first critics to praise J. K. Rowling, Philip Pullman, Cressida Cowell, Stephenie Meyer, Anthony Horowitz, Malorie Blackman and Suzanne Collins. She has been described by The Daily Telegraph as "a pioneering children’s fiction critic".

Craig gave the annual Trollope Society lecture in 2022 and the 2023 Dorothy L Sayers lecture.

Following her struggle to get A Vicious Circle published, she became a campaigner with International PEN for the reform of English defamation law.

In an opinion piece in The Independent, Craig asked why fiction remains obsessed by historical fiction and neglects the contemporary, saying she has "set out to take the DNA of a Victorian novel – its spirit of realism, its strong plot, its cast of characters who are not passively shaped by circumstances but who rise to challenges or escape them." She has said in interviews that she considers writing contemporary fiction to be "a moral duty".

Craig's eleventh novel High and Low focuses on the current volatile state of the nation.

== Adaptations ==
In 2023, it was announced that the rights to The Three Graces had been optioned by television company Monumental Television.

== Bibliography ==
=== Books ===
- Foreign bodies. Hutchinson. 1990.
- A Private Place (1991), Hutchinson
- A Vicious Circle (1996), 4th Estate
- In a Dark Wood (2000), 4th Estate
- Love in Idleness (2003), Little, Brown UK
- Hearts and Minds (2009), Little, Brown UK
- The Other Side of You (novella) (2017), Little, Brown UK
- The Lie of the Land (2017), Little, Brown UK
- The Golden Rule (2020), Little, Brown UK
- The Three Graces (2023), Little, Brown UK
- High and Low (2026), Little, Brown UK
