= Cultural depictions of Isabella of France =

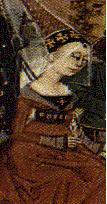
15th century depiction of Isabella

Isabella of France (1295 – 22 August 1358) was Queen of England and the daughter of Philip IV of France. Sometimes called the "She-Wolf of France", she was a key figure in the rebellion which deposed her husband, Edward II of England, in favor of their eldest son Edward III. This event, as well as Isabella's affair with Roger Mortimer and Edward II's relationships with Piers Gaveston and Hugh Despenser the Younger, have prompted Isabella's portrayal multiple times in literature and visual media.

== Theatre and poetry ==
- Edward II (c. 1592), play by Christopher Marlowe
- Mortimer His Fall (1641), an unfinished play by Ben Jonson
- The Bard (1757), poem by Thomas Gray
- L'assedio di Calais (The Siege of Calais) (1836), opera in three acts by Gaetano Donizetti
- The Life of Edward II of England (1923), play by Bertolt Brecht based on Marlowe's play
- Edward II (1995), ballet in two acts based on Marlowe's play, directed by David Bintley with music by John McCabe

== Novels ==
- Les Rois maudits (The Accursed Kings), a French historical novel series by Maurice Druon, in particular:
  - Le Roi de fer (The Iron King) (1955)
  - La Louve de France (The She-Wolf of France) (1959)
  - Le Lys et le lion (The Lily and the Lion) (1960)
- Isabel the Fair (1957) by Margaret Campbell Barnes
- Harlot Queen (1970) by Hilda Lewis
- Lord of Misrule (1972) by Eve Trevaskis
- The Queen and Mortimer (1974) by Brenda Honeyman
- The King's Minions (1974) by Brenda Honeyman (prequel to The Queen and Mortimer)
- She-Wolf (1975) by Pamela Bennetts
- Where Nobles Tread (1975) by Janet Kilbourne
- King's Wake (1977) by Eve Trevaskis
- Brittle Glory (1977) by Jean Evans
- A Love So Bold (1978) historical romance by Annelise Kamada
- The Follies of the King (1980) by Jean Plaidy (Book 8 in the Plantagenet series)
- The Gascon (1984) by John Colin Penford
- Isabella, the She-Wolf (1985) by Maureen Peters
- Gaveston (1992) by Chris Hunt
- Letter from Poitou (2004) by Michael Eardley
- The Traitor's Wife: A Novel of the Reign of Edward II (2005) by Susan Higginbotham
- Mathilde of Westminster, an historical mystery series by Paul C. Doherty:
  - The Cup of Ghosts (2005)
  - The Poison Maiden (2007)
  - The Darkening Glass (2009)
- Queen of Shadows (2006) by Edith Felber
- Knights Templar Mysteries, a series by Michael Jecks, in particular:
  - The Templar, the Queen and Her Lover (2007)
  - The Oath (2010)
  - King’s Gold (2011)
- The Ruling Passion (2008) by David Pownall
- The King's Mistress (2010) by Emma Campion
- Isabella: Braveheart of France (2013) by Colin Falconer
- Gate of the Dead (2016) by David Gilman
- To Calais, in Ordinary Time (2019) by James Meek.
- The House of Cursed Daughters (2026) by C.J. Cooke

== Television, film and radio ==
- Edward II (1970), BBC TV adaptation of Marlowe's play directed by Richard Marquand and Tony Robertson; Isabella is portrayed by Diane Fletcher
- Les Rois maudits (1972), French miniseries adaptation of the Druon novels directed by Claude Barma; Isabella is portrayed by Geneviève Casile
- Edward II (1982), French TV film adaptation Marlowe's play directed by Bernard Sobel; Isabella is portrayed by Hélène Vincent
- Edward II (1991), film based on Marlowe's play and directed by Derek Jarman; Isabella is portrayed by Tilda Swinton
- Braveheart (1995), film directed by Mel Gibson; Isabella is portrayed by Sophie Marceau
- Les Rois maudits (2005), French miniseries adaptation of the Druon novels directed by Josée Dayan; Isabella is portrayed by Julie Gayet
- The Ruling Passion (2008), audio presentation of Pownall's novel in 10 episodes of the BBC Radio 4 programme Book at Bedtime, read by David Horovitz
- World Without End (2012), miniseries directed by Michael Caton-Jones; Isabella is portrayed by Aure Atika (the miniseries is based on the 2007 Ken Follett novel of the same name in which Isabella does not appear)
- Knightfall (2017), television series about the Knights Templar; Isabella is portrayed by Sabrina Bartlett as a main character in season one, and by Genevieve Gaunt as a recurring character in season two.

== Documentaries ==
- She-Wolves: England's Early Queens (UK, 2012)
- Britain's Bloodiest Dynasty (UK, 2014) - Adina Eady
- The Real War of Thrones(La Guerre des Trônes, la véritable histoire de l'Europe) (France, 2017-2024), Season 1

== Illuminated manuscript illustrations ==
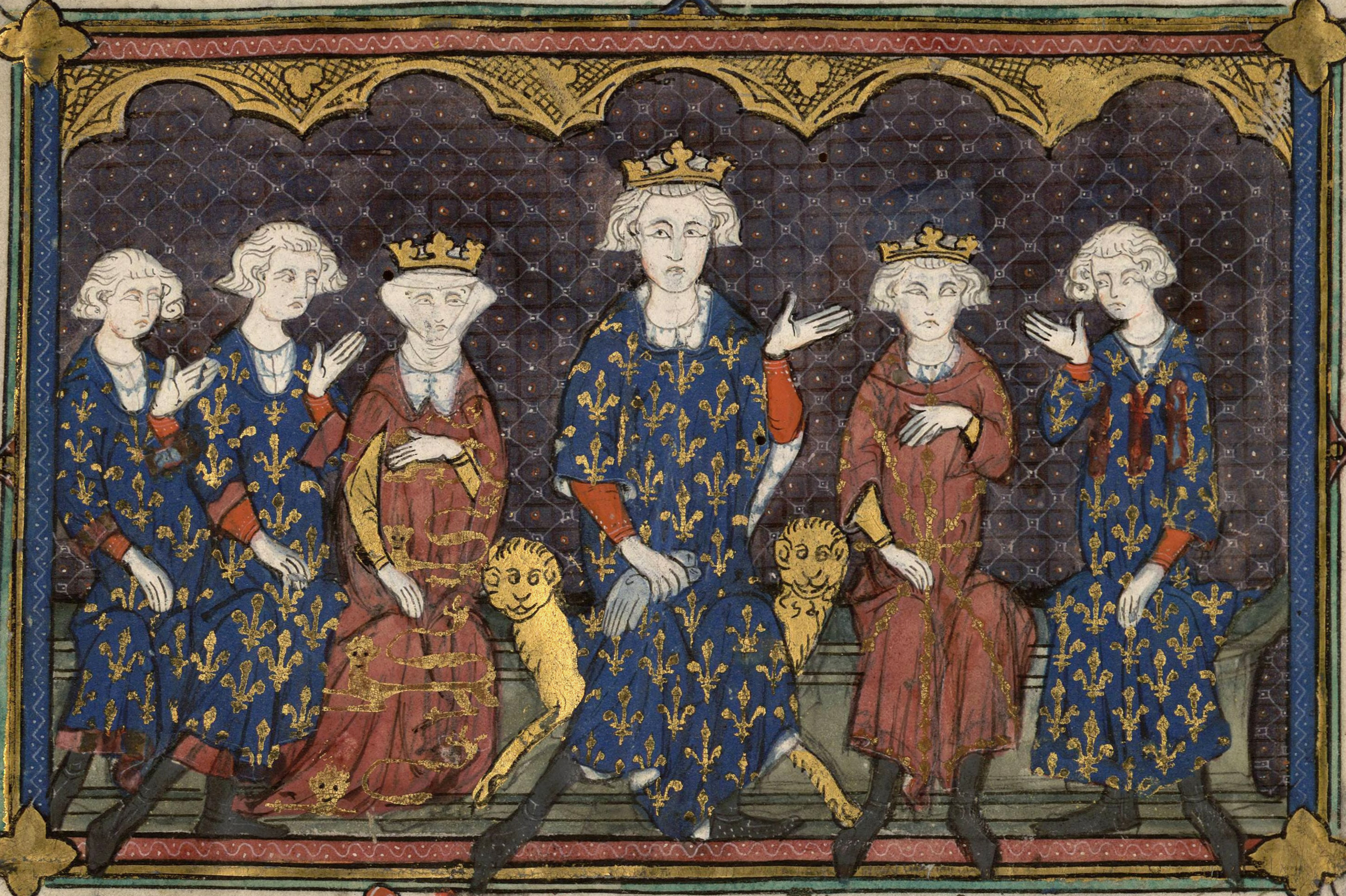
Isabella's French family, depicted in a 1313 miniature (illuminated manuscript illustration). From left to right: Isabella's brothers, Charles IV and Philip V, Isabella herself, her father Philip IV, her brother Louis X, and her uncle, Charles of Valois.

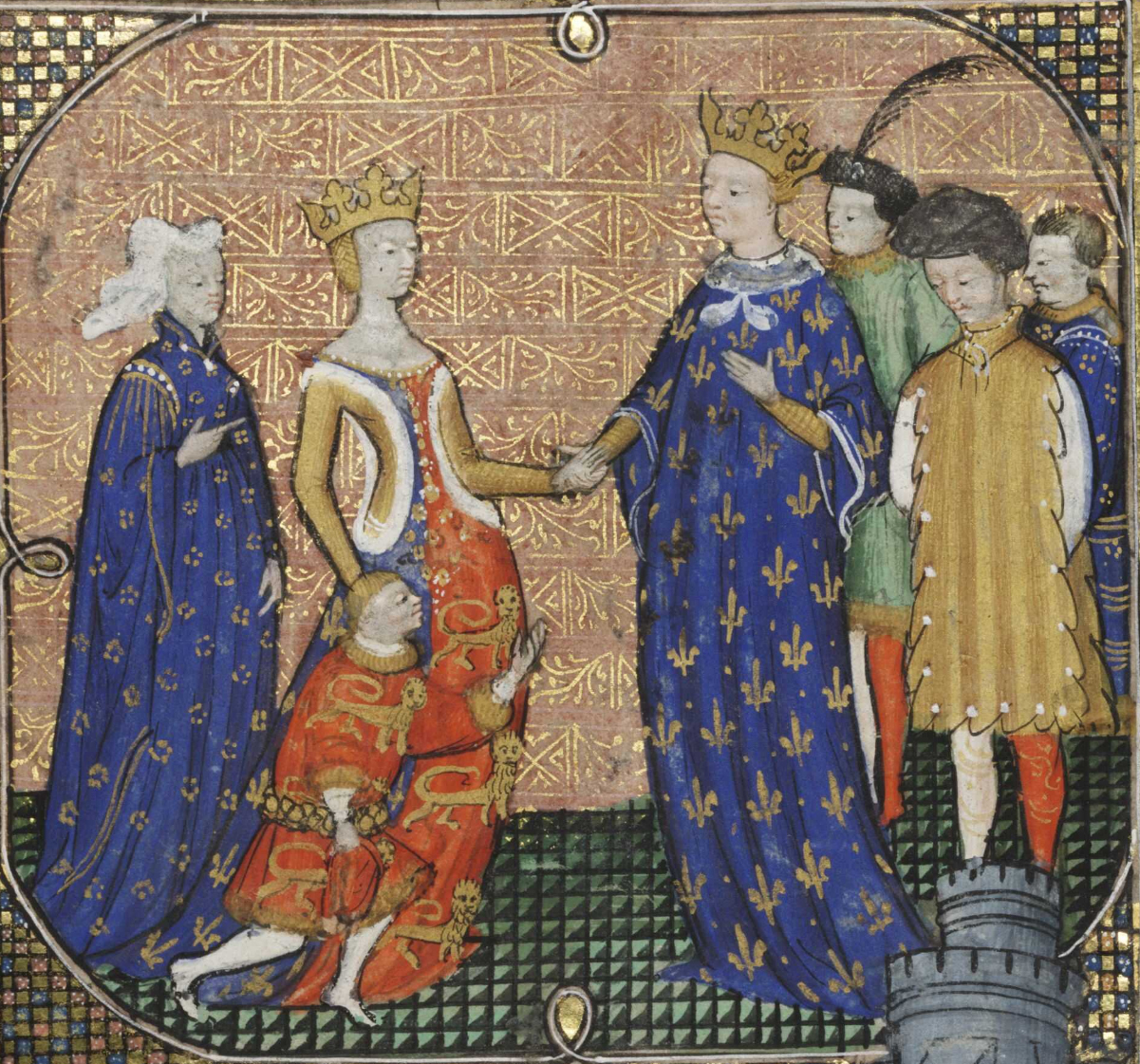
15th century miniature showing the future Edward III giving homage to Charles IV, under the guidance of his mother Isabella in 1325.

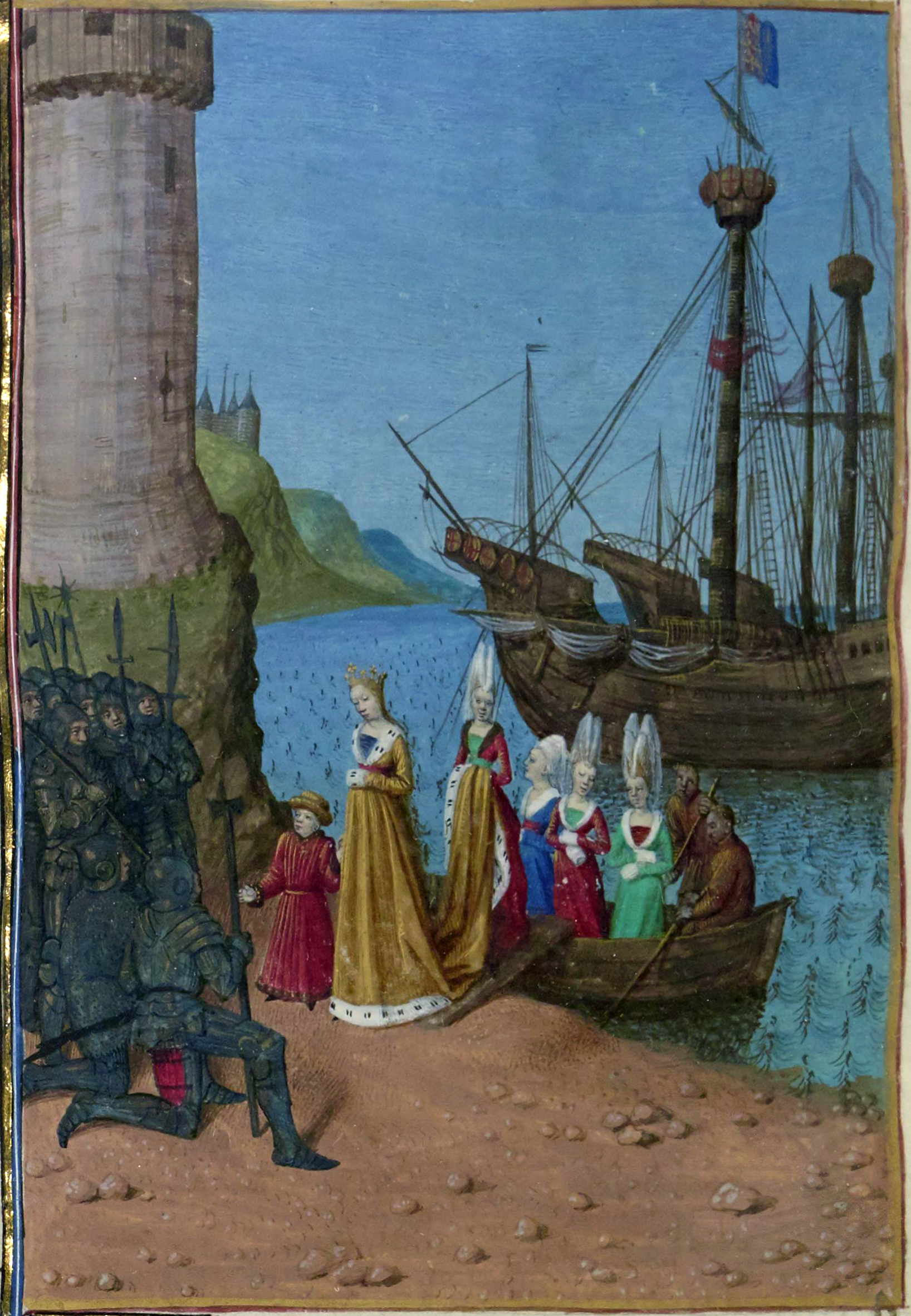
15th century miniature (c. 1455) of Isabella landing in England with the future Edward III in 1326.

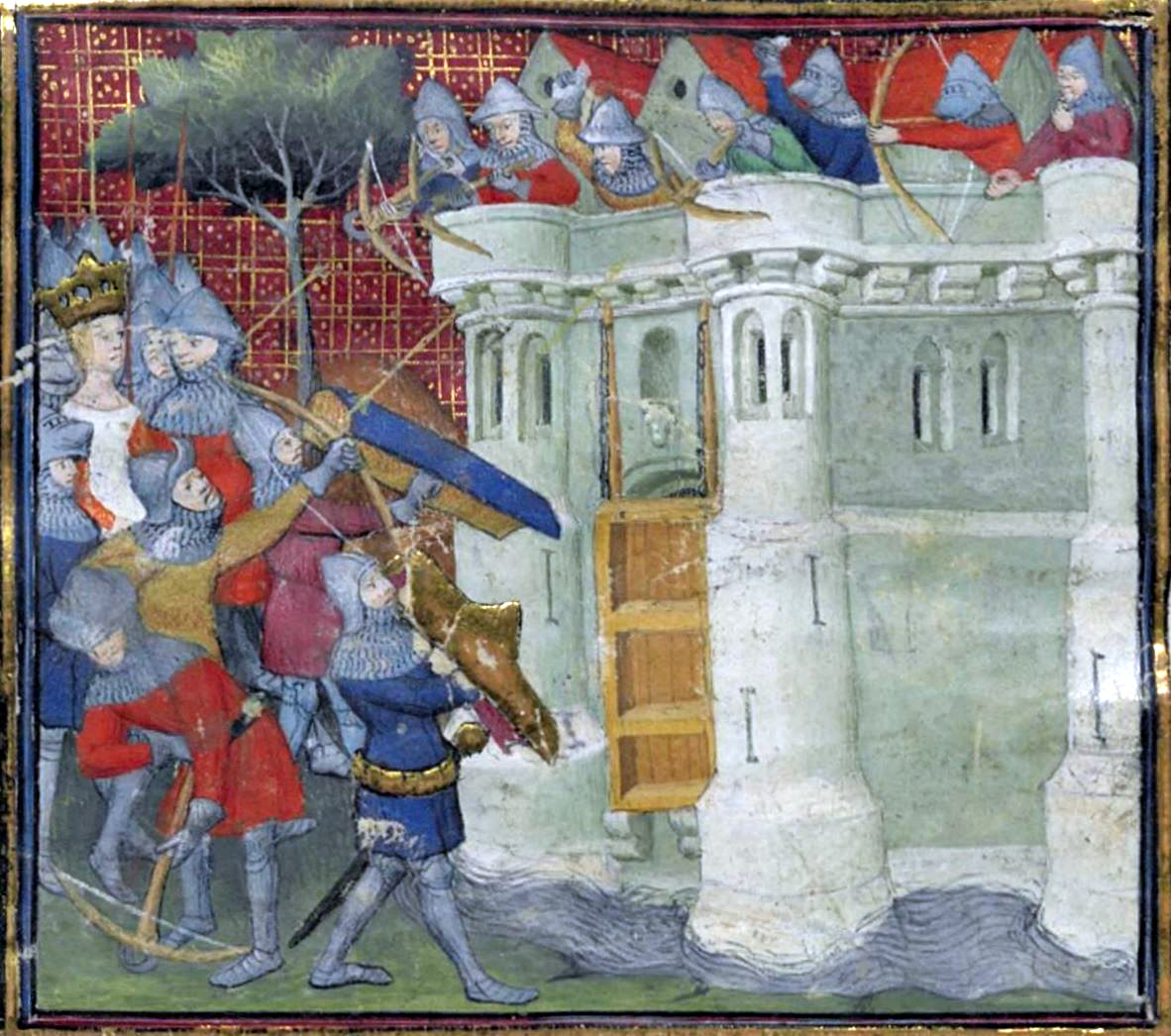
15th century miniature of Isabella (left) directing the Siege of Bristol in October 1326.

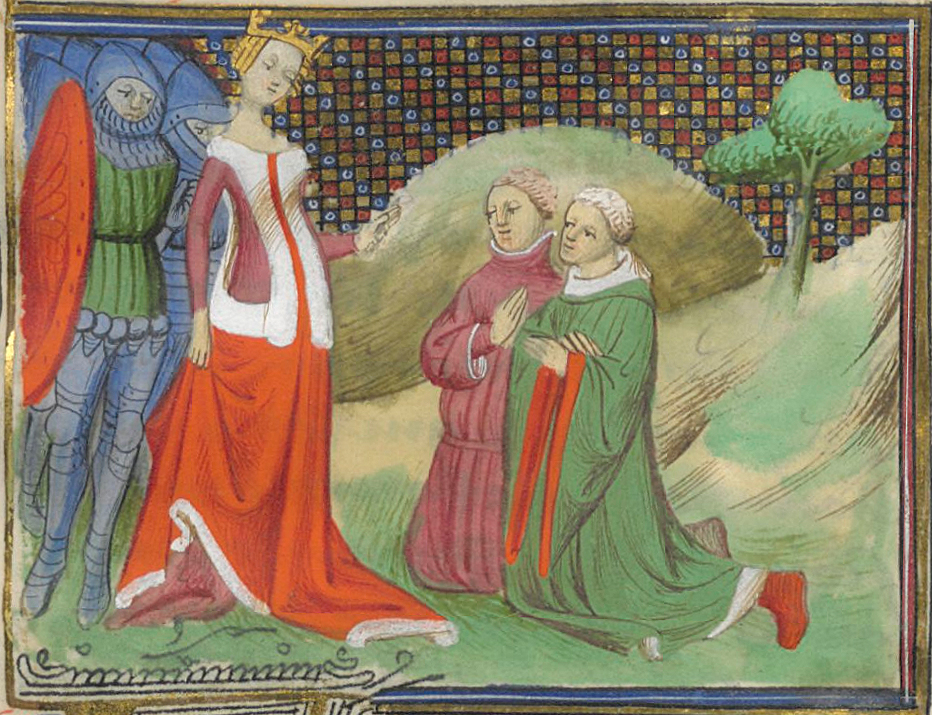
Hugh Despenser the younger and Edmund Fitzalan brought before Isabella for trial in 1326, from the early 15th century Froissart's Chronicles, by the Boethius Master.

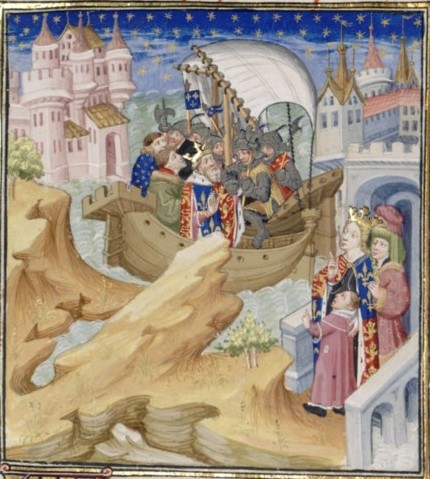
Imaginative 15th century interpretation of Edward II's arrest by Isabella, seen watching from the right.

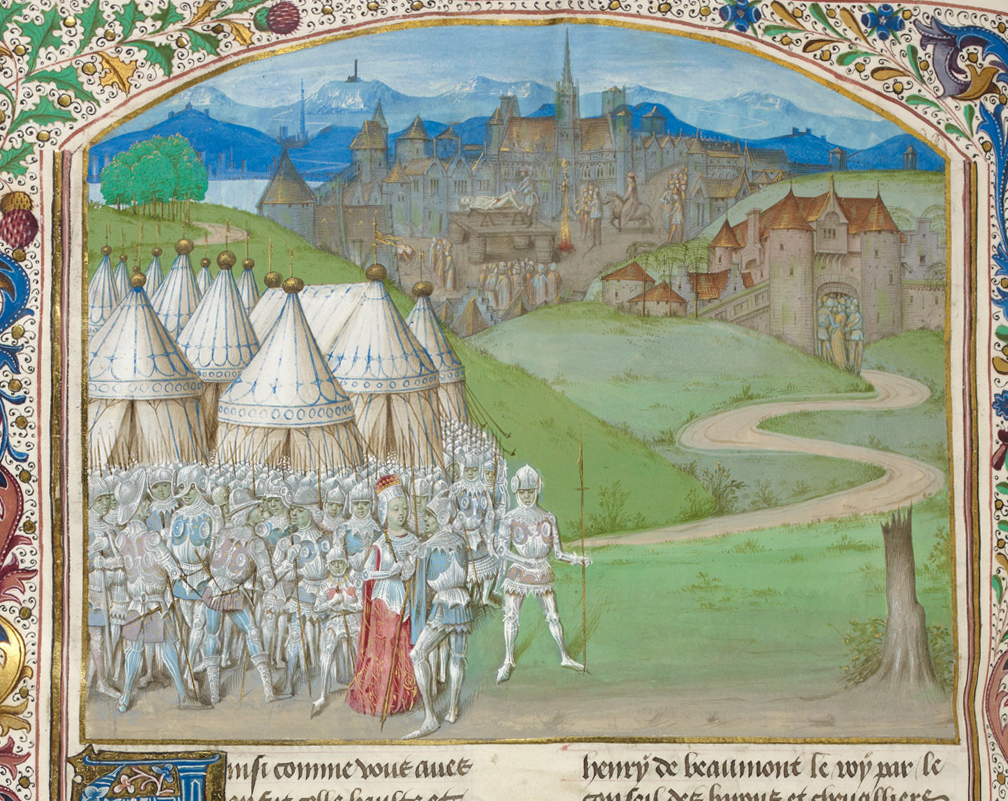
15th century manuscript miniature depicting Isabella and allegedly Roger Mortimer, 1st Earl of March at Hereford, with the execution of Hugh Despenser the Younger in the background.
