= Historical mystery =

Literary subgenre

Melville Davisson Post's Uncle Abner: Master of Mysteries collection (1918)

The historical mystery or historical whodunit is a subgenre of two literary genres, historical fiction and mystery fiction. These works are set in a time period considered historical from the author's perspective, and the central plot involves the solving of a mystery or crime (usually murder). Though works combining these genres have existed since at least the early 20th century, many credit Ellis Peters's Cadfael Chronicles (1977–1994) for popularizing what would become known as the historical mystery. The increasing popularity and prevalence of this type of fiction in subsequent decades has spawned a distinct subgenre recognized by the publishing industry and libraries. Publishers Weekly noted in 2010 of the genre, "The past decade has seen an explosion in both quantity and quality. Never before have so many historical mysteries been published, by so many gifted writers, and covering such a wide range of times and places." Editor Keith Kahla concurs, "From a small group of writers with a very specialized audience, the historical mystery has become a critically acclaimed, award-winning genre with a toehold on the New York Times bestseller list."

Since 1999, the British Crime Writers' Association has awarded the CWA Historical Dagger award to novels in the genre. The Left Coast Crime conference has presented its Bruce Alexander Memorial Historical Mystery award (for mysteries set prior to 1950) since 2004.

== Origins ==
Though the term "whodunit" was coined sometime in the early 1930s, it has been argued that the detective story itself has its origins as early as the 429 BC Sophocles play Oedipus Rex and the 10th century tale "The Three Apples" from One Thousand and One Nights (Arabian Nights). During China's Ming dynasty (1368–1644), gong'an ("crime-case") folk novels were written in which government magistrates—primarily the historical Di Renjie of the Tang dynasty (618–907) and Bao Zheng of the Song dynasty (960–1279)—investigate cases and then as judges determine guilt and punishment. The stories were set in the past but contained many anachronisms. Robert van Gulik came across the 18th century anonymously written Chinese manuscript Di Gong An, in his view closer to the Western tradition of detective fiction than other gong'an tales and so more likely to appeal to non-Chinese readers, and in 1949 published it in English as Celebrated Cases of Judge Dee. He subsequently wrote his own Judge Dee stories (1951–1968) in the same style and time period.

Perhaps the first modern English work that can be classified as both historical fiction and a mystery however is the 1911 Melville Davisson Post story "The Angel of the Lord", which features amateur detective Uncle Abner in pre-American Civil War West Virginia. Barry Zeman of the Mystery Writers of America calls the Uncle Abner short stories "the starting point for true historical mysteries." In the 22 Uncle Abner tales Post wrote between 1911 and 1928, the character puzzles out local mysteries with his keen observation and knowledge of the Bible. It was not until 1943 that American mystery writer Lillian de la Torre did something similar in the story "The Great Seal of England", casting 18th century literary figures Samuel Johnson and James Boswell into Sherlock Holmes and Dr. Watson roles in what would become the first of her Dr. Sam: Johnson, Detector series of stories. In 1944, Agatha Christie published Death Comes as the End, a mystery novel set in ancient Egypt and the first full-length historical whodunit. In 1950, John Dickson Carr published the second full-length historical mystery novel called The Bride of Newgate, set at the close of the Napoleonic Wars.

== Popularization ==
In 1970, Peter Lovesey began a series of novels featuring Sergeant Cribb, a Victorian-era police detective, and Elizabeth Peters's Amelia Peabody series (1975–2010) followed the adventures of the titular Victorian lady/archaeologist as she solved mysteries surrounding her excavations in early 20th century Egypt. But historical mystery stories remained an oddity until the late 1970s with the success of Ellis Peters and her Cadfael Chronicles (1977–1994), featuring Benedictine monk Brother Cadfael and set in 12th century Shrewsbury. Umberto Eco's one-off The Name of the Rose (1980) also helped popularize the concept, and starting in 1979, author Anne Perry wrote two series of Victorian era mysteries featuring Thomas Pitt (1979–2013) and William Monk (1990–2013).

In the 1990 the genre's popularity expanded significantly with works such as Lindsey Davis's Falco and Flavia Albia novels (1989–2022), set in the Roman Empire of Vespasian; John Maddox Roberts's SPQR series (1990–2010), Steven Saylor's Roma Sub Rosa novels (1991–2018), both set in the Roman Republic in the 1st century BC; and Paul Doherty's various series, including the Hugh Corbett medieval mysteries (1986–2010), the Sorrowful Mysteries of Brother Athelstan (1991–2012), and the Canterbury Tales of Mystery and Murder (1994–2012). Diana Gabaldon began the Lord John series in 1998, casting a recurring secondary character from her Outlander series, Lord John Grey, as a nobleman-military officer-amateur detective in 18th century England. Using the pen name Ariana Franklin, Diana Norman wrote four Mistress of the Art of Death novels between 2007 and 2010, featuring 12th-century English medical examiner Adelia Aguilar.

Publishers Weekly noted in 2010 of the genre, "The past decade has seen an explosion in both quantity and quality. Never before have so many historical mysteries been published, by so many gifted writers, and covering such a wide range of times and places." Editor Keith Kahla concurs, "From a small group of writers with a very specialized audience, the historical mystery has become a critically acclaimed, award-winning genre with a toehold on the New York Times bestseller list."

== Awards ==
In 1999, the British Crime Writers' Association awarded the first CWA Historical Dagger award to a novel in the genre. The award was called the Ellis Peters Historical Dagger through 2012. In 2014, Endeavour Press supported the award, which is called the Endeavour Historical Dagger for the 2014 and 2015 awards. The Left Coast Crime conference has presented its Bruce Alexander Memorial Historical Mystery award (for mysteries set prior to 1950) since 2004.

== Variations ==
In an early twist of the genre, Josephine Tey's The Daughter of Time (1951) features a modern police detective who alleviates an extended hospital stay by investigating the 15th century case of Richard III of England and the Princes in the Tower. Georgette Heyer's The Talisman Ring (1936), set in 1793 England, is a Regency romance with elements of mystery that Jane Aiken Hodge called "very nearly a detective story in period costume". Many of Heyer's other historical romances have thriller elements but to a much lesser extent.

Other variations include mystery novels set in alternate history timelines or even fantasy worlds. These would include The Ultimate Solution (1973) by Eric Norden and Fatherland (1992) by Robert Harris, both being police procedurals set in alternate timelines where the Nazis won World War II; Randall Garrett's Lord Darcy series, taking place in a 20th-century in which magic is possible; and Phyllis Ann Karr's The Idylls of the Queen (1982), set in King Arthur's court as depicted in Arthurian myth and with no attempt at historical accuracy.

The genre would not include fiction which was contemporary at the time of writing, such as Arthur Conan Doyle's canonical Sherlock Holmes works set in Victorian England, or the Lord Peter Wimsey books by Dorothy L. Sayers set in the Interwar period. However, subsequent Holmes and Wimsey books written by other authors decades later could arguably be classified as historical mysteries.

== List of fictional historical detectives ==
The following list consists of fictional historical detectives in chronological order of their time period setting:

Detective	Setting	Period	Creator	Debut Title	Debut Year
Lieutenant Bak	Ancient Egypt	15th century BCE	Lauren Haney	The Right Hand of Amon	1997
Amerokte	Ancient Egypt	15th century BCE	Paul Doherty	The Mask of Ra	1998
Lord Meren	Ancient Egypt	14th century BCE	Lynda S. Robinson	Murder in the Place of Anubis	1994
Rahotep	Ancient Egypt	14th century BCE	Nick Drake	Nefertiti: The Book of the Dead	2006
Heracles Pontor	Classical Athens	Late 5th century BCE	José Carlos Somoza	The Athenian Murders	2000
Nicolaos	Classical Athens	5th century BCE	Gary Corby	The Pericles Commission	2010
Aristotle	Classical Athens	4th century BCE	Margaret Doody	Aristotle Detective	1978
Alexander the Great	Ancient Greece	4th century BCE	Paul Doherty	A Murder in Macedon	1997
Senator Decius Metellus	Roman Republic	1st century BCE	John Maddox Roberts	SPQR	1990
Gordianus the Finder	Roman Republic	1st century BCE	Steven Saylor	Roman Blood	1991
Marcus Corvinus	Rome	1st century CE	David Wishart	Ovid	1995
Marcus Didius Falco	Roman Empire	70 to 77 CE	Lindsey Davis	The Silver Pigs	1989
Flavia Gemina	Roman Empire	79 to 81 CE	Caroline Lawrence	The Thieves of Ostia	2001
Flavia Albia	Roman Empire	89 CE	Lindsey Davis	The Ides of April	2013
Gaius Petreius Ruso	Roman Empire	2nd century CE	Ruth Downie	Ruso and the Disappearing Dancing Girls (U.S. title: Medicus)	2006
Libertus	Roman Empire	Late 2nd century CE	Rosemary Rowe	The Germanicus Mosaic	1999
John, the Lord Chamberlain	Constantinople	6th century	Mary Reed/Eric Mayer	One for Sorrow	1999
Judge Dee	China	7th century	Robert van Gulik	Di Gong An	1949
Li Kao	China	7th century	Barry Hughart	Bridge of Birds	1984
Sister Fidelma	Ireland	7th century	Peter Tremayne	Absolution by Murder	1994
Father George	Byzantine Empire	8th century	Harry Turtledove	Farmers' Law	2000
Sugawara Akitada	Japan	11th century	I. J. Parker	Instruments of Murder	1997
Lassair	England	11th century	Alys Clare	Out of the Dawn Light	2009
Brother Cadfael	Wales and England	1120, 1137–1145	Ellis Peters	A Morbid Taste for Bones	1977
Justin de Quincy	England	12th century	Sharon Kay Penman	The Queen's Man	1996
Josse d'Acquin/Abbess of Hawkenlye	England	12th century	Alys Clare	Fortune Like the Moon	1999
Magdalene la a Bâtarde	London	12th century	Roberta Gellis	A Mortal Bane	1999
Adelia Aguilar	England	12th century	Ariana Franklin	Mistress of the Art of Death	2007
Hugh Corbett	England	13th century	Paul Doherty	Satan in St Mary's	1986
Theophilos (Feste)	Illyria, Constantinople, Tyre, Denmark, etc.	13th century	Alan Gordon	Thirteenth Night	1999
Edwin Weaver	England	13th century	Catherine Hanley	The Sins of the Father	2009
Oldřich of Chlum	Bohemia and Moravia	13th century	Vlastimil Vondruška	Dýka s hadem (Dagger with a snake)	2002
Brother William of Baskerville	Italy	1327	Umberto Eco	The Name of the Rose	1980
Baldwin de Furnshill	Devon	14th century	Michael Jecks	The Last Templar	1995
Matthew Bartholomew	England	14th century	Susanna Gregory	A Plague on Both Your Houses	1996
Mathilde of Westminster	England	14th century	Paul Doherty	The Cup of Ghosts	2005
Brother Athelstan	London	Late 14th century	Paul Doherty	The Nightingale Gallery	1991
Owen Archer	York	Late 14th century	Candace Robb	The Apothecary Rose	1993
Melchior Wakenstede	Estonia	Early 15th century	Indrek Hargla	Apothecary Melchior and the Mystery of St Olaf's Church	2010
Roger the Chapman	England	15th century	Kate Sedley	Death and the Chapman	1991
Dame Frevisse	Oxfordshire	15th century	Margaret Frazer	The Novice's Tale	1992
Kathryn Swinbrooke	England	15th century	Paul Doherty	A Shrine of Murders	1993
Acatl, High Priest of Mictlantecuhtli	Tenochtitlan	1480	Aliette de Bodard	Obsidian Shards (novella)	2007
Cesare Aldo	Florence, Italy	1536	D.V. bishop	City of Vengeance	2021
Sigismondo	Italian Renaissance	15th century	Elizabeth Eyre	Death of the Duchess	1991
Sir Roger Shallot	England	16th century	Paul Doherty	The White Rose Murders	1991
Nicholas Segalla	England; Edinburgh; France; Vienna	1558; 1567; 1793; 1889	Paul Doherty	A Time for the Death of a King	1994
Matthew Shardlake	London	16th century	C. J. Sansom	Dissolution	2003
Bianca Goddard	London	16th century	Mary Lawrence	The Alchemist's Daughter	2015
Giordano Bruno	London	16th century	S. J. Parris	Heresy	2010
Sir Robert Carey	Carlisle, then London	Late 16th century	Patricia Finney (writing as P F Chisholm)	A Famine of Horses	1994
Sano Ichirō	Genroku-era Japan	17th century	Laura Joh Rowland	Shinjū	1994
Thomas Chaloner	England	17th century	Susanna Gregory	A Conspiracy of Violence	2006
Benjamin Weaver	England	1720	David Liss	A Conspiracy of Paper	2000
Thomas af Boueberg	Denmark-Norway	Early 18th century	Kurt Aust	Vredens dag (The Day of Wrath)	1999
Canaletto	England	18th century	Janet Laurence	Canaletto and the Case of Westminster Bridge	1997
John Fielding	England	18th century	Bruce Alexander Cook	Blind Justice	1994
Lord John Grey	England, Prussia, Scotland and Jamaica	1756–1761	Diana Gabaldon	Lord John and the Hellfire Club	1998
Samuel Johnson/James Boswell	England	18th century	Lillian de la Torre	The Great Seal of England	1943
Dick Darwent	England	1815	John Dickson Carr	The Bride of Newgate	1950
Matthew Hawkwood	England	18th century	James McGee	Trigger Men	1985
Mary Bennett	England	Early 19th century	Katherine Cowley	The Secret Life of Miss Mary Bennet	2021
Sergeant Cribb	England	19th century	Peter Lovesey	Wobble to Death	1970
Thomas Pitt	England	19th century	Anne Perry	The Cater Street Hangman	1979
William Monk	England	19th century	Anne Perry	The Face of a Stranger	1990
Mrs. Jeffries	England	19th century	Emily Brightwell	The Inspector and Mrs. Jeffries	1993
Hanno Stiffeniis	Prussia	Early 19th century	Michael Gregorio	Critique of Criminal Reason	2006
Edmund Blackstone	England	1820s	Richard Falkirk	Blackstone	1972
Benjamin January	New Orleans	1833	Barbara Hambly	A Free Man of Color	1997
Yashim the Eunuch	Ottoman Empire	1836	Jason Goodwin	The Janissary Tree	2006
Uncle Abner	West Virginia	Mid-19th century	Melville Davisson Post	The Angel of the Lord	1911
The Dante Club	Boston	1865	Matthew Pearl	The Dante Club	2003
Erast Fandorin	Russia, Japan, etc.	1876–1914	Boris Akunin	The Winter Queen	1998
Ambrose Bierce	San Francisco	Late 19th century	Oakley Hall	Ambrose Bierce and the Queen of Spades	1998
William Murdoch	Toronto	1890s	Maureen Jennings	Except the Dying	1997
Laszlo Kreisler	New York	1896-97	Caleb Carr	The Alienist	1994
Sister Pelagia	Russia	1890s / Early 20th century	Boris Akunin	Pelagia and the White Bulldog	2000 (Russian); 2006 (English)
Amelia Peabody	Egypt	1884–1923	Elizabeth Peters	Crocodile on the Sandbank	1975
Alexander von Reisden	Boston	Early 20th century	Sarah Smith	The Vanished Child	1992
Max Liebermann and Oskar Reinhardt	Vienna	Early 20th century	Frank Tallis	Mortal Mischief (A Death in Vienna)	2005
Simon Ziele	New York City	Early 20th century	Stefanie Pintoff	In the Shadow of Gotham	2009
Mary Russell	Worldwide	Early 20th century	Laurie R. King	The Beekeeper's Apprentice	1994
Isaac Bell	Worldwide	Early 20th century	Clive Cussler	The Chase	1994
Joe Sandilands	Colonial India, Europe	1920s/1930s	Barbara Cleverly	The Last Kashmiri Rose	2007
Sam Wyndham and Surendranath Bannerjee	Calcutta, British Raj	1920s	Abir Mukherjee	A Rising Man	2016
Maisie Dobbs	England	1929-1942	Jacqueline Winspear	Maisie Dobbs	2003
Gereon Rath	Berlin	1920s/1930s	Volker Kutscher	Babylon Berlin (Der nasse fisch)	2008
Bernie Gunther	Berlin	1934–1954	Philip Kerr	March Violets	1989
Laetitia Talbot	Crete, Burgundy, Athens	1920s	Barbara Cleverly	The Tomb of Zeus	2007
Phryne Fisher	Melbourne	1920s	Kerry Greenwood	Cocaine Blues	1989
Professor John Stableford	England	1930s	Rob Reef	Stableford on Golf	2013
Lady Georgiana	England/Scotland	1930s	Rhys Bowen	Her Royal Spyness	2007
Alexei Korolev	Moscow	1936	William Ryan	The Holy Thief	2010
Toby Peters	Los Angeles	1940s	Stuart M. Kaminsky	Bullet for a Star	1977
Kasper Meier	Berlin	1946	Ben Fergusson	The Spring of Kasper Meier	2014
