= Cultural depictions of Edward II of England =

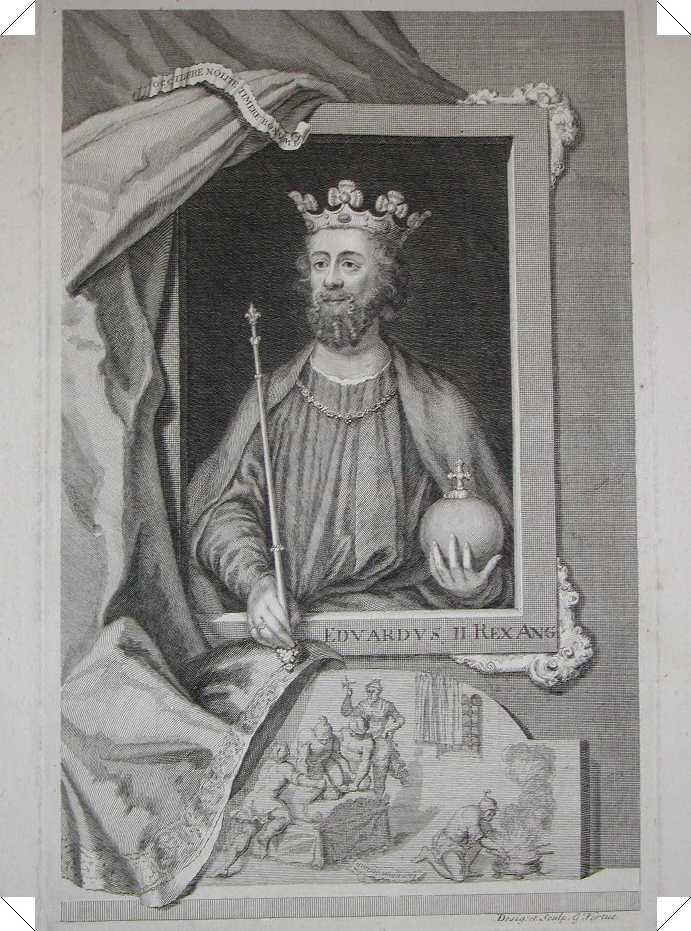
Fictional portrait of King Edward II of England. The scene on the lower part shows the king being murdered. Ca. 1700 AD

Edward II of England has been portrayed in popular culture a number of times.

== Theatre and music ==
- The most famous fictional account of Edward II's reign is Christopher Marlowe's play Edward II (c. 1592). It depicts Edward's reign as a single narrative and does not include Bannockburn. It makes reference to Gaveston. In recent years, several acclaimed productions have been staged in the United Kingdom, although the play is seldom performed in the United States outside of large cities and university towns.
- Bertolt Brecht's adaptation of Marlowe's play, The Life of Edward II of England, was written in 1923.
- The character of Patrick de Salis in Susan Howatch's historical novel Cashelmara is based on Edward II.
- The English world music/folk/reggae band Edward the Second and the Red Hot Polkas, formed in Cheltenham, Gloucestershire in 1985, took for its original name a punning reference to the supposed manner of Edward's murder in the nearby Berkeley Castle.
- The English composer John McCabe's ballet, Edward II (1995), is also based on the Marlowe play.
- English classical composer George Benjamin's 2018 opera Lessons in Love and Violence, based on the libretto of Martin Crimp, uses the Edward II theme.
- The Scottish patriotic song (and national anthem candidate), "Flower of Scotland," written by Roy Williamson of The Corries, mentions Edward II's defeat at the Battle of Bannockburn.

== Literature ==
- Margaret Campbell Barnes' Isabel the Fair focuses on Queen Isabella.
- John Crowley's first novel, The Deep (1975), features (in part) a fantasy version of the story of Edward II and his Wars as seen by a strangely sexless visitor from outside the world.
- Medieval mystery novelist P. C. Doherty has set a number of his books against the backdrop of Edward II's reign.
- Maurice Druon traces the life and death of Edward II in his historical magnum opus Les Rois maudits (The Accursed Kings).
- Part of the plot of Ken Follett's novel World Without End (2007) revolves around a secret letter that proved Edward II had survived and escaped imprisonment, which letter was potentially embarrassing to both Isabella and Edward III.
- British novelist Robert Goddard's novel Name to a Face (2007) discusses the theories and circumstances of Edward II's survival. Within a fictionalized setting, it is speculated that an older Edward II may be the identity of a semi-legendary medieval figure known as the Grey Man of Ennor, who traveled England mysteriously curing sufferers of the Black Death in the mid-14th century.
- Susan Higginbotham, in The Traitor's Wife: A Novel of the Reign of Edward II (2005), looks at the reign and its aftermath through the eyes of Hugh le Despenser's wife, Eleanor de Clare.
- Brenda Honeyman's The Queen and Mortimer focuses on Queen Isabella.
- Chris Hunt's novel, Gaveston (1992), published by the Gay Men's Press, is based on Edward's life, in particular his relationship with Piers Gaveston, as well as Edward's subsequent relationships.
- Medieval mystery novelist Michael Jecks has set a number of his books against the backdrop of Edward II's reign.
- Hilda Lewis' Harlot Queen (1970) focuses on Queen Isabella and her relationship with Edward II.
- Maureen Peters' Isabella, the She-Wolf focuses on Queen Isabella.
- Eve Trevaskis' King's Wake starts shortly after the fall of the Despensers and ends with the fall of Roger Mortimer.

== Film and television ==
Onscreen, Edward has been portrayed by:

- Ian McKellen in the BBC TV adaptation of Marlowe's Edward II (1970)
- Michel Beaune in the 1972 French TV adaptation of Druon's novels
- Philippe Clévenot in the French TV adaptation of Marlowe's Edward II (1982)
- Steven Waddington in Derek Jarman's 1991 cinematic version of Christopher Marlowe's play - which utilized 20th century clothing and gay rights marches as an aspect of the story.
- Peter Hanly in Braveheart (1995). The film portrays Edward as weak, effeminate and homosexual with a Piers Gaveston-like lover. Several sequences are fictional, such as Edward's lover being pushed through a window to his death by Edward I, and Edward being cuckolded by William Wallace, who is represented as the real father of Edward III.
- Richard Brimblecombe in the British film The Bruce (1996)
- Christopher Buchholz in the 2005 French TV adaptation of Druon's novels
- Ben Chaplin in the miniseries World Without End (2012) during which he survives his assassination and lives in exile in Kingsbridge under the name of Thomas Langley, the man who had been ordered to kill him.
- Billy Howle in the Netflix film Outlaw King (2018)

== Radio ==
- Edward II is the focus of the BBC Radio 4 Book at Bedtime: The Ruling Passion, by David Pownell, read by David Horovitz. This was broadcast from Monday 27 October to Friday 7 November 2008.
