= Lynda Suzanne Robinson =

American novelist (born 1951)

- Born: July 6, 1951 (age 75); Amarillo, Texas, U.S.
- Education: Rice University; University of Texas at Austin
- Occupation: Novelist
- Writing career
- Pen name: Suzanne Robinson, Linda S. Robinson
- Period: Since 1990
- Genres: Romance, fantasy, mystery fiction

Lynda Suzanne Robinson (born July 6, 1951) is an American writer of romance fiction under the name Suzanne Robinson and mystery novels under the name Lynda S. Robinson. She is best known for her Lord Meren series of historical mysteries set in Ancient Egypt during the reign of Tutankhamun.

== Biography ==
Lynda Suzanne Heavener was born in Amarillo, Texas to George H. Measley Heavener and Lois Ann Womack Heavener. She received an associate degree from San Jacinto College in 1971 and her undergraduate degree in 1973 from Rice University. The same year she married Wessley I. Robinson, who worked as a school administrator.

In 1984 Robinson earned a Ph.D. in anthropology from the University of Texas at Austin with a specialization in archaeology. While working on her dissertation, Robinson realized she didn't want to work in academia. Her husband suggested she try writing fiction, which she did.

Robinson lives in Texas in the south central hill country with her husband.

== Writing career ==
Robinson publishes her fiction under different variations of her name. As Suzanne Robinson, she has written twelve historical romances of various settings and time periods ranging from ancient Egypt to the Elizabethan and Victorian periods. Robinson's first published novel, "Heart of the Falcon", was a historical romance set in ancient Egypt with a heavy dose of suspense and mystery.

As Lynda S. Robinson, she is the author of critically acclaimed Lord Meren series of mysteries set in ancient Egypt. Lord Meren is King Tutankhamen's chief investigator and trusted advisor. The books focus on political intrigue such as plots against the pharaoh and also feature Queen Nefertiti. The first book in the series, Murder in the Place of Anubis, was published in 1994 and received a starred review from Publishers Weekly along with praise from Kirkus Reviews and other media outlets.

== Critical reception ==
According to the Guide to Literary Masters & Their Works, Robinson's novels are known for "painstaking historical research, insight into human relationships, an understanding of political intrigue, and a gift for inventing suspenseful plots."

Writing in The New York Times, Marilyn Stasio praised the Lord Meren series as "fascinating," saying Robinson uses "her scholarship to penetrate the inner precincts of court and temple, she has written a complex and exciting narrative that reflects the twisted machinations of politicians -- royal and otherwise."

== Bibliography ==
=== As Suzanne Robinson ===
Sorted by publication

==== Single novels ====
- Heart of the Falcon 1990/May
- Lady Gallant 1992/Fev
- Lady Hellefire 1992/Jun
- Lady Defiant 1993/Jan
- Lady Dangerous 1994/Mar
- Lord of the Dragon 1995/Sep
- The Engagement 1996/Jun
- The Rescue 1998/Fev
- The Treasure 1999/Apr
- Just Before Midnight 2000/Fev
- The Legend 2001/Mar
- Never Trust a Lady 2003/Aug

==== St. John Family Series ====
1. Lady Valiant 1993/Jun
2. Lord of Enchantment 1995/Jan

==== Anthologies in collaboration ====
- "The unwanted bride" in WHEN YOU WISH 1997/Nov (with Jane Feather, Sharon & Tom Curtis, Patricia Coughlin, Elizabeth Elliott, Patricia Potter)

=== As Lynda S. Robinson ===
==== The Lord Meren series ====
Novels

1. Murder in the Place of Anubis (1994, ISBN 0-8027-3249-6; 2021)
2. Murder at the God's Gate (1995, ISBN 0-8027-3198-8; 2021)
3. Murder at the Feast of Rejoicing (1996, ISBN 0-8027-3274-7; 2021)
4. Eater of Souls (1997, ISBN 0-8027-3294-1; 2021)
5. Drinker of Blood (1998, ISBN 0-89296-673-4; 2021)
6. Slayer of Gods (2001, ISBN 0-89296-705-6; 2021)

Short Stories

1. Heretic's Dagger (2002, in Mammoth Book of Egyptian Whodunnits, ISBN 0-78671-065-9; 2024)

== See also ==
- P. C. Doherty
- Lauren Haney
