= Brightwell (surname) =

Brightwell is an English surname derived from Brightwell or a similar toponym. Notable people of the name include the following:

- Emily Brightwell (born 1948), American writer
- Gary Brightwell (born 1999), American football player
- Matahi Brightwell (born 1952), New Zealand master carver and waka ama founder
- Robbie Brightwell (1939-2022), British athlete
- Thomas Brightwell, English academic administrator
