= The Problem of the Covered Bridge =

Short story

- Short story by Edward D. Hoch
- Country: United States
- Language: English

Publication
- Publisher: Ellery Queen's Mystery Magazine
- Media type: Magazine
- Publication date: December 1974

Chronology
—	The Problem of the Old Gristmill

"The Problem of the Covered Bridge" (1974) is a mystery short story by Edward D. Hoch which was first published in Ellery Queen's Mystery Magazine (Dec 1974 issue). It is part of a sub-type of the locked room mystery known as an impossible crime story. It introduces the characters of Dr. Sam Hawthorn, Sheriff Lens, and the town of Northmont. It is included in Hoch's book Diagnosis: Impossible: The Problems of Dr. Sam Hawthorne (Crippen & Landru, 1996). It is also included in All but Impossible!, the famous anthology edited by Hoch.

Hoch was inspired while looking at a watercolor landscape of a covered bridge; the story developed from his idea of a carriage riding into the covered bridge but never coming out the other side. He says it took him two days to work out the idea and develop the story. He created as the detective character a New England doctor in 1930s, and named him Sam after Sam Sheppard. The editors of Ellery Queen's Mystery Magazine liked the idea, but added a surname to distinguish him from Lillian de la Torre's famous Dr Sam: Johnson. The editors also suggested that Hoch make his character speak in a country dialect.

This was probably the most talked about story of the series. Hoch wrote a later story, "The Second Problem of the Covered Bridge", which was published in EQMM December 1998. Three more stories about the character followed.

== Plot summary ==
The story is told in flashback by an older Dr. Sam Hawthorn to an unidentified listener. The flashback is set in March 1922, when Sam first came to the small town of Northmont in his new yellow Pierce-Arrow. He meets the Bringlow family, Jacob and Sarah, their daughters Susan and Sally, their son Hank, and Hank's fiancée Millie. Dr. Sam is treating Sarah, and has come to know the Bringlows well. He notices that Hank is reading copies of Hearst's International magazine, which includes the two-part Sherlock Holmes story, "The Problem of Thor Bridge". Hank leaves to take a jar of apple sauce to Millie's house in a horse and buggy. Sam and Millie follow Hank in another buggy. They are stopped briefly when Walt Rumsey drives his cattle across the road to drink from a pond, and Hank disappears into the distance while they are stopped. Sam and Millie follow Hank's tracks to a covered bridge. The tracks enter the bridge, but don't come out the other side. There is a smashed jar of apple sauce in the middle of the bridge. Hank, his horse and buggy have disappeared.

The Bringlows call Sheriff Lens, who declares that Hank is playing a trick, and will return eventually. They later find Hank at the side of the road in his buggy, but he is dead, shot in the back of the head. The reins had been tied down, indicating that Hank was already dead before the buggy came to a halt. Realizing that Walt Rumsey was driving his cattle to drink from a frozen pond, Dr. Sam investigates and tries to apply the solution of "The Problem of Thor Bridge" to the murder. When he works out what has happened, he gathers all of the suspects at the Bringlow house to reveal the solution.

Dr. Sam explains that the disappearance was planned as a joke by Hank, enlisting Rumsey's assistance. While the herd delayed Sam and Millie, Hank and Walt created fake buggy tracks into the covered bridge using a pair of extra buggy wheels. Then Hank hid in Walt's barn. Walt, having been in love with Millie and jealous of Hank, saw his opportunity to kill his romantic rival and cover up the crime.
