= Stormy Waters =

Stormy Waters may refer to:

- Stormy Waters (1941 film), a French drama film
- Stormy Waters (1928 film), an American silent drama film
- "Stormy Waters", a 2017 episode of Splash and Bubbles
- "Stormy Waters", B-side of the 1998 single "Wildsurf" by Ash
- "Stormy Waters", a song by The Hollies from the 1979 album Five Three One - Double Seven O Four
- Derek "Stormy" Waters, a fictional character in Sealab 2021
- Stormy Waters, a 2000 novel by Rosemary Aitken
