= Alys Clare =

British author

Alys Clare is a pseudonym of Elizabeth Harris, author of English historical whodunnit novels primarily set in medieval times, featuring the characters of Abbess Helewise and Josse d'Acquin. Brought up in the countryside close to where the Hawkenlye Novels are set, she went to school in Tonbridge and later studied English at the University of Keele. She has also published books as Elizabeth Harris.

== Hawkenlye mysteries ==
Set in 12th-century England and featuring would-be detectives Josse d'Acquin and the Abbess of Hawkenlye, published by Hodder & Stoughton and Severn House.

1. Fortune Like the Moon (1999)
2. Ashes of the Elements (2000)
3. The Tavern in the Morning (2000)
4. The Chatter of the Maidens (2001)
5. The Faithful Dead (2002)
6. A Dark Night Hidden (2003)
7. Whiter Than the Lily (2004)
8. Girl in a Red Tunic (2005)
9. Heart of Ice (2006)
10. The Enchanter's Forest (2007)
11. The Paths of the Air (2008)
12. The Joys of My Life (2009)
13. The Rose of the World (2011)
14. The Song of the Nightingale (2012)
15. The Winter King (2013)
16. A Shadowed Evil (2015)
17. The Devil's Cup (2017)

== Aelf Fen mysteries ==
Set in 11th-century England and featuring the healer Lassair, published by Severn House.

1. Out of the Dawn Light (2009)
2. Mist Over the Water (2009)
3. Music of the Distant Stars (2010)
4. The Way Between the Worlds (2011)
5. Land of the Silver Dragon (2013)
6. Blood of the South (2014)
7. The Night Wanderer (2016)
8. The Rufus Spy (2017)
9. City of Pearl (2019)
10. The Lammas Wild (2021)

== Gabriel Taverner mysteries ==
Set in Stuart England featuring physician Dr Gabriel Taverner

1. A Rustle of Silk (2016)
2. The Angel in the Glass (2018)
3. The Indigo Ghosts (2020)
4. Magic in the Weave (2021)
5. The Cargo from Neira (2023)
6. The Chrysanthemum Tiger (2024)

== World's End Bureau mysteries ==
Set in Victorian England

1. The Woman Who Spoke to Spirits (2019)
2. The Outcast Girls (2020)
3. The Man in the Shadows (2022)
4. The Stranger in the Asylum (2024)

== Other novels ==
- The Herb Gatherers (1991) (writing as Elizabeth Harris)
- The Egyptian Years (1992) (writing as Elizabeth Harris)
- The Sun Worshippers (1993) (writing as Elizabeth Harris)
- Time of the Wolf (1994) (writing as Elizabeth Harris)
- The Quiet Earth (1995) (writing as Elizabeth Harris)
- The Sacrifice Stone (1996) (writing as Elizabeth Harris)
- The Twilight Child (1997) (writing as Elizabeth Harris)
