= Brightwell =

Brightwell may refer to:

- Brightwell, Suffolk, England
- Brightwell Baldwin in Oxfordshire, England
- Brightwell-cum-Sotwell in Oxfordshire (previously Berkshire), England
- Brightwell (surname)
