= John, the Lord Chamberlain series =

Historical mystery novel series by Mary Reed and Eric Mayer

- 1st edition, One for Sorrow (1999)
- One for Sorrow (1999); Two for Joy (2000); Three for a Letter (2001); Four for a Boy (2003); Five for Silver (2004); Six for Gold (2005); Seven for a Secret (2008); Eight for Eternity (2010); Nine for the Devil (2012); Ten for Dying (2014)
- Author: Mary Reed/Eric Mayer
- Country: United States
- Language: English
- Genre: Historical mystery
- Publisher: Poisoned Pen Press
- Published: November 15, 1999 – present
- Media type: Print (Hardcover & Paperback)

The John, the Lord Chamberlain series is a series of historical mystery novels by Mary Reed and Eric Mayer. Also known as the "John the Eunuch" mysteries, the novels feature John, Emperor Justinian's Lord Chamberlain, a eunuch who solves mysteries in 6th-century Constantinople. Publishers Weekly praises the series' "Subtle, well-drawn characters, from the ascetic John to the capricious and enigmatic Justinian; deft descriptive detail revealing life in the late Roman Empire; and sharp dialogue make this another winner in this outstanding historical series."

== Novels ==
- One for Sorrow (1999) ISBN 978-1890208196 (Poisoned Pen Press)
- Two for Joy (2000) ISBN 978-1890208370 (Poisoned Pen Press)
- Three for a Letter (2001) ISBN 978-1890208820 (Poisoned Pen Press)
- Four for a Boy (2003) ISBN 978-1590580318 (Poisoned Pen Press)
- Five for Silver (2004) ISBN 978-1590581124 (Poisoned Pen Press)
- Six for Gold (2005) ISBN 978-1590581452 (Poisoned Pen Press)
- Seven for a Secret (2008) ISBN 978-1590584897 (Poisoned Pen Press)
- Eight for Eternity (2010) ISBN 978-1590587027 (Poisoned Pen Press)
- Nine for the Devil (2012) ISBN 978-1590589946 (Poisoned Pen Press)
- Ten for Dying (2014) ISBN 978-1464202278 (Poisoned Pen Press)
- Murder in Megara (2015) ISBN 978-1464204081 (Poisoned Pen Press)
- An Empire for Ravens (2018) ISBN 978-1464211102 (Poisoned Pen Press)

== Fictional character biography ==
The life story of John the Lord Chamberlain (sometimes also known as John the Eununch) is told in disconnected episodes throughout all the books, but the series begins with John being a freed ex-slave who now serves the emperor Justinian as the Imperial Chamberlain.

John was born somewhere in Greece to a rich family and was sent to the Academy at Athens to learn under the scholar Philo (Bk 2) but grew impatient and left the academy to serve as a mercenary overseas, going as far as Britain (Bk 1). It's revealed that because one of his comrades drowned in a river, John is hydrophobic and is afraid of swimming.

Afterwards, John left and became a travelling performer with a theatrical group. On Crete, he falls in love with Cornelia, a gymnast (Bk 3). John and Cornelia consummate their relationship, but near the border with the Sassanian empire, John is abducted, castrated, and then sold off to the Imperial government as a eunuch. He first works under the Master of the Plate, Leukos (who is murdered by a corrupt innkeeper in Bk 1), but wins his freedom and eventually rises to the rank of Imperial Chamberlain after investigation into the death of a Byzantine magnate named Hypatius (Bk 4).

Although John enjoys the confidence of the emperor, his escapades and investigations makes him many enemies, from the page boy Hektor all the way to the empress Theodora (whose murder of a young Gothic prince has to be covered up by John in Bk 2). John however is not without allies, ranging from his colleagues Felix and Anatolius, all the way to his servants Hypatia and Peter, and much later his daughter by Cornelia, named Europa.
