= Mahu (noble) =

Ancient Egyptian official of the 18th Dynasty

- Chief of Police at Akhetaten
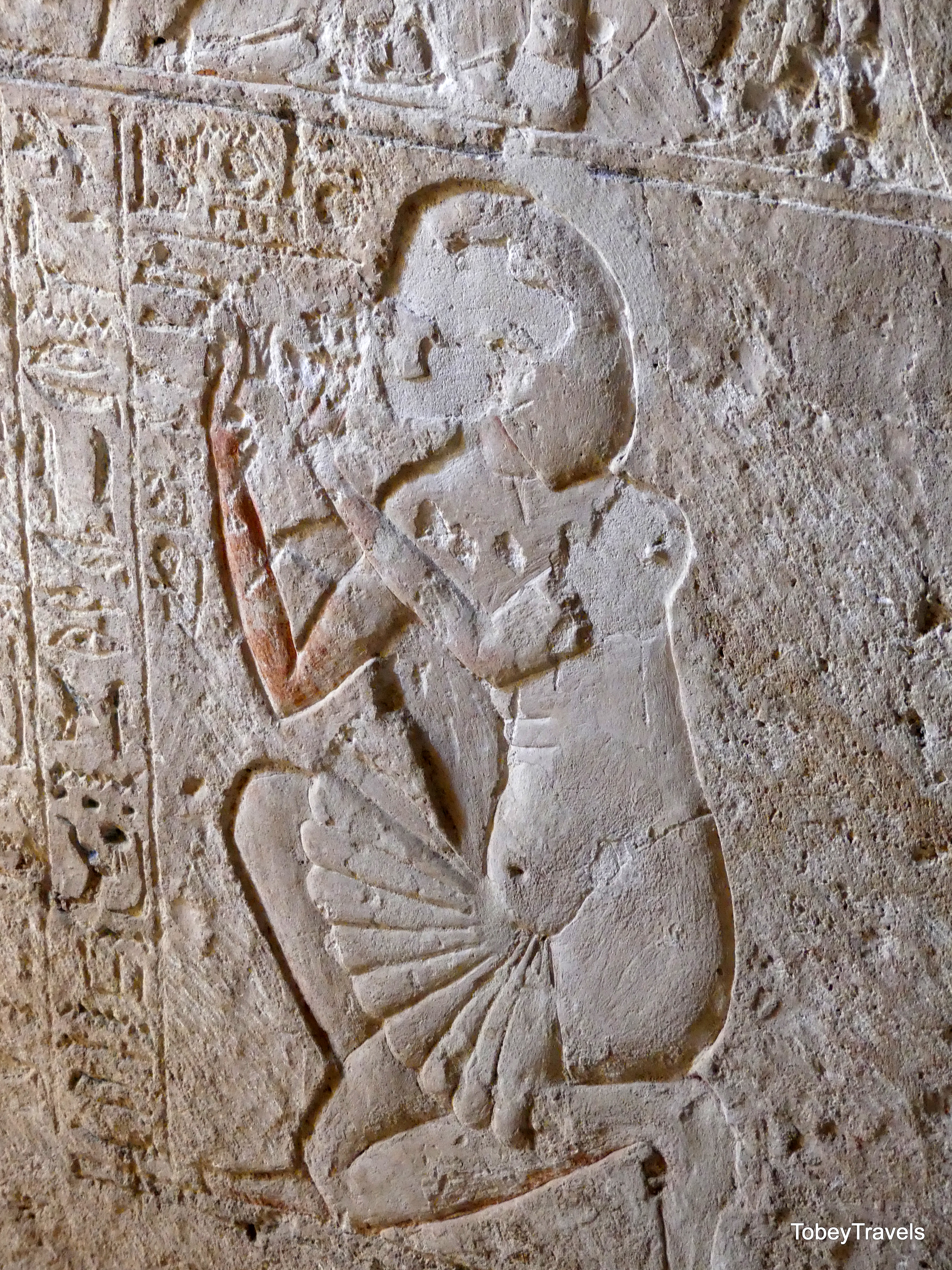
- Mahu Prays to the God Aten in Amarna Tomb 9
Egyptian name
Aa15 a F18 Y1 A52
- Dynasty: 18th Dynasty
- Pharaoh: Akhenaten
- Burial: Amarna Tomb 9

Mahu was the Chief of Police at Akhetaten.

== Biography ==
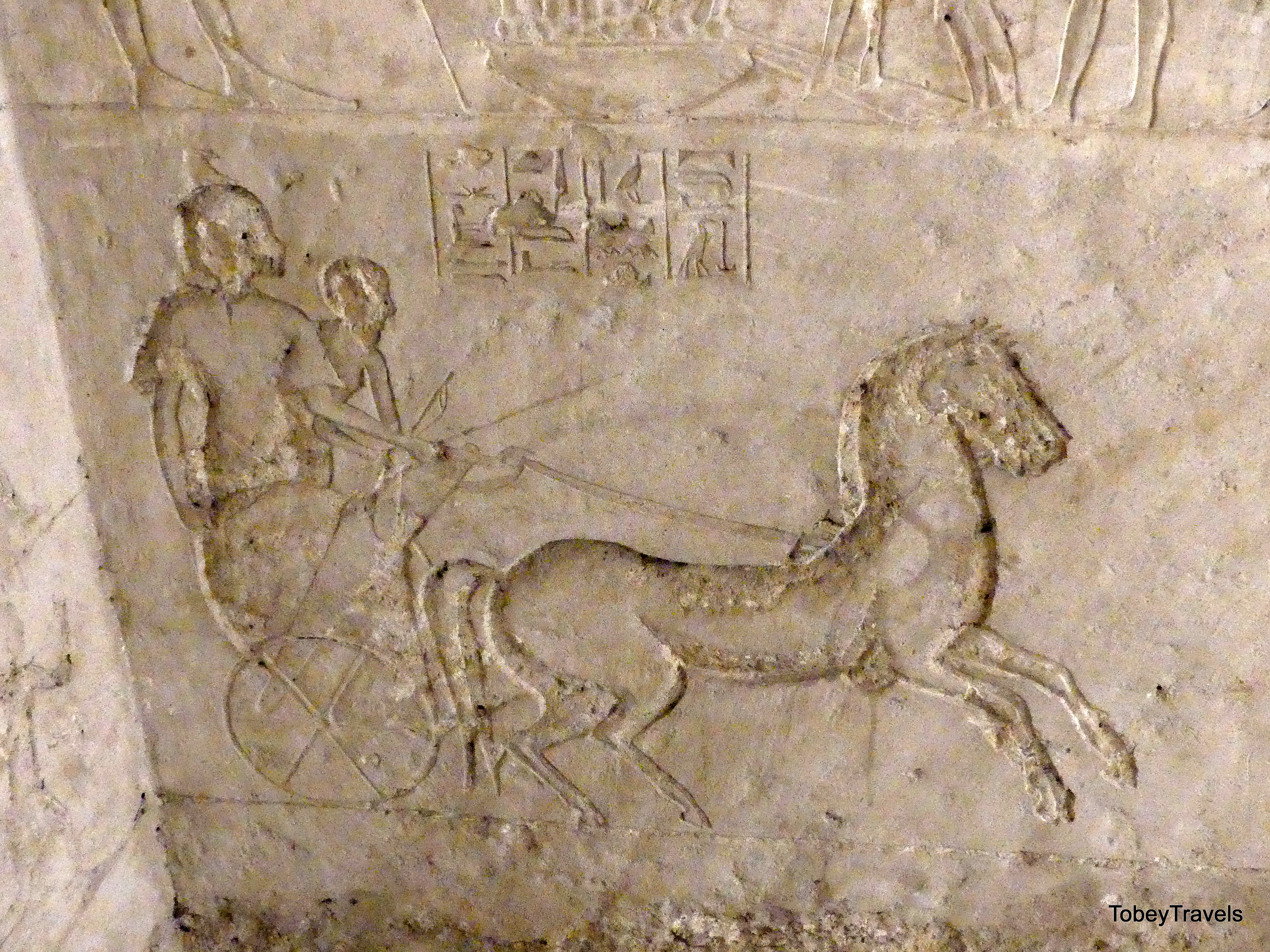
Mahu rides his chariot in his Amarna tomb.

Mahu was Chief of the paramilitary Medjay force of Akhetaten under Akhenaten. The Medjay used to be a term for the people of the Eastern desert who were known for their military skills, and at this time referred to the police.

== Tomb ==
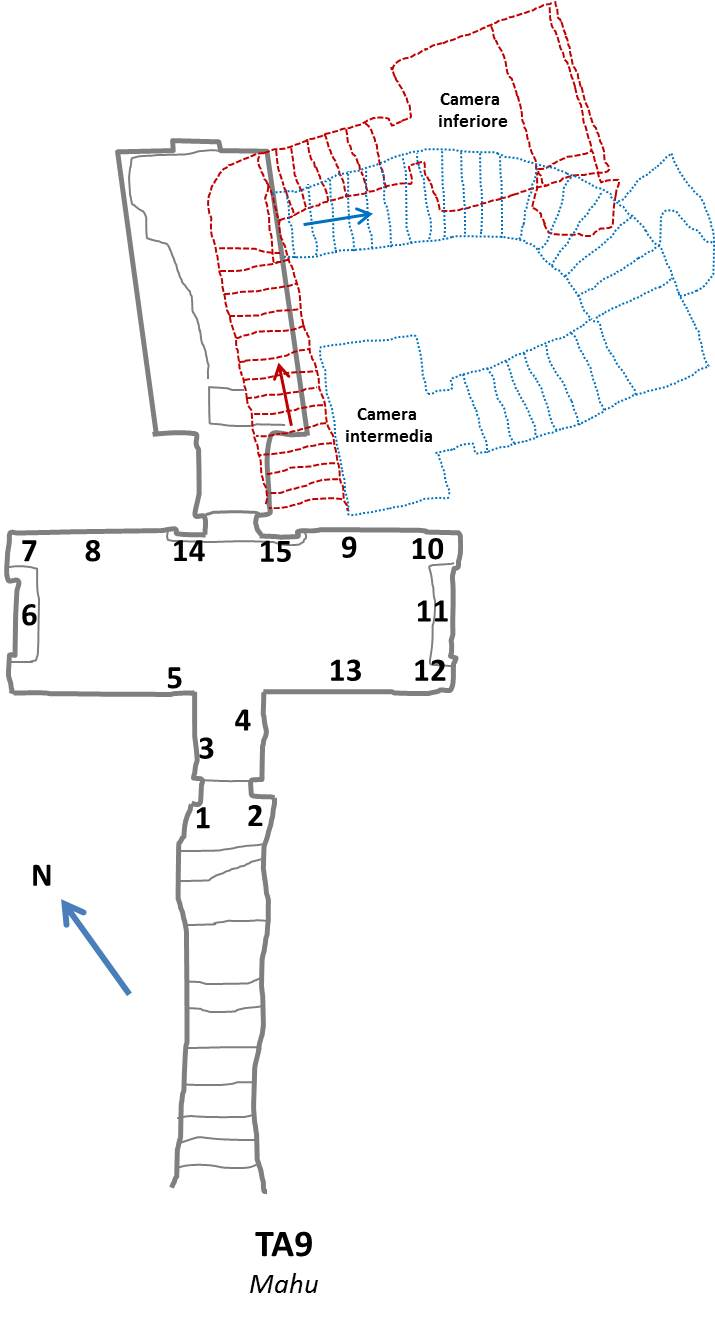
Plan of the tomb of Mahu

Mahu's tomb is Amarna Tomb 9 of the Tombs of the Nobles at Amarna. The tomb was first opened by Urbain Bouriant in 1883. A roughly hewn corridor leads to a decorated doorway. This doorway is decorated on one side with a scene depicting Akhenaten and Nefertiti and their eldest daughter Meritaten offering to the Aten. The opposite wall is decorated with the kneeling Mahu and an inscription of the Hymn of the Aten.

This leads to the first chamber which contains a stele on one end and a false door at the other. The stele shows the royal couple and their daughter again, with a depiction and accompanying prayers of Mahu. The false door similarly shows the royal couple offering and Mahu kneeling with a large text. Davies mentions that the prayers contain a large number of errors.

The walls are decorated as well and show both the duties and the rewards of Mahu. The rewards appear on the front wall and on the northern half of the back wall. The inscriptions were not finished but the sketches indicate that there would have been a reward scene showing the king bestowing honors on Mahu at the Window of Appearance. Mahu was shown accompanied by his men, the Medjay. Another scene showed Mahu receiving honors not at the palace, but at a temple.

He is shown inspecting the defences of the city with the king and queen. This scene seems to be uniquely designed for this tomb. The vizier and other officials are also present. In another scene Mahu is shown in his work policing the city, and is shown in a meeting with the vizier (probably Nakhtpaaten) and a lesser official named Heqanefer. Mahu is leading three prisoners before the vizier. Being in the reset without permission was apparently something one would be arrested for.

Scenes in the tomb show platforms with ramps manned by police. Military standards are shown on these platforms. These structures may have formed a series of watchtowers and watch posts that were used to patrol the city.

In the back is a doorway to a second chamber that is positioned slightly askew compared to the first chamber. A winding set of stairs at the back of this second chamber leads down to an intermediary room. Further steps complete the turn and lead to the lower chamber which contains the burial pit.

== In modern literature ==
Paul C. Doherty wrote a trilogy of books told by Mahu in a (very frank) first-person narrative, recounting the events of the age of Akhenaten and his part in them and his relationships with other personages of the Amarna period.

- An Evil Spirit Out of the West (2003)
- The Season of the Hyaena (2005)
- The Year of the Cobra (2005)
