= Gary Corby =

Australian author (born 1963)

- Born: 1963; Sydney, Australia
- Occupation: novelist
- Writing career
- Period: 2008 - present
- Genre: historical mystery
- Notable work: The Athenian Mysteries
- Website: garycorby.com

Gary Corby is an Australian author of historical mysteries set in the world of Classical Greece.

His novels feature historical figures from the time as recurring characters, notably Socrates, Pericles, and the priestess Diotima of Mantinea. The series hero is a fictional detective/agent named Nicolaos; the heroine is Diotima.

== Published works ==
=== The Athenian Mysteries ===
1. The Pericles Commission (2010) ISBN 978-0-312-59902-7
2. The Ionia Sanction (2011) ISBN 978-0-312-59901-0
3. Sacred Games (2013) ISBN 978-1-61695-227-3
4. The Marathon Conspiracy (2014) ISBN 978-1-61695-387-4
5. Death ex Machina (2015) ISBN 978-1-61695-519-9
6. The Singer from Memphis (2016) ISBN 978-1-61695-668-4
7. Death on Delos (2017) ISBN 978-1-61695-821-3

== Awards and nominations ==
- Nominated for the Ned Kelly Award for Best First Novel in 2010, for The Pericles Commission.
- Winner of the 2008 Arthur Conan Doyle Prize for new fiction in the historical mystery category for the short story The Pasion Contract.
