= The Bride of Newgate =

1950 novel by John Dickson Carr

- First edition (US)
- Author: John Dickson Carr
- Language: English
- Genre: Historical mystery
- Publisher: Hamish Hamilton (UK) & Harper (USA)
- Publication date: 1950
- Publication place: United Kingdom
- Media type: Print (hardback & paperback)
- Pages: 308 (1st US)

The Bride of Newgate, first published in 1950, is a historical whodunnit novel by American writer John Dickson Carr, which does not feature any of Carr's series detectives. Set in England in 1815, the book combines two literary genres, historical fiction and the whodunit/detective story and is "one of the earliest historical mystery novels."

== Plot summary ==
Miss Caroline Ross, in order to inherit a fortune, must be married but, in the London of 1815, such a marriage would turn control of the funds over to her husband. She therefore marries Dick Darwent, a convicted murderer who is to be hanged in Newgate Prison the next day, who agrees to the marriage so that Caroline will settle money upon his mistress, the actress Dolly Spencer. However, when it is learned that Dick has succeeded to the title of the Marquis of Darwent, his trial is invalidated; a peer must be tried by the House of Lords. The commutation of his sentence means that he has made a deadly enemy in the form of Sir John Buckstone, a brutal dandy who is one of Caroline's suitors. Darwent has been framed for murder by a mysterious figure known only as "the coachman". He must sort out his domestic arrangements, which include his wife and mistress under one roof, prove himself innocent of the murder of which he was convicted, and reveal the identity of the evil figure behind his problems.
