= Days of Atonement =

Book by Michael Gregorio

- First edition
- Author: Michael Gregorio
- Language: English
- Genre: Crime novel
- Publisher: Faber and Faber
- Publication date: 2007
- Publication place: United Kingdom
- Media type: Print (Paperback)
- Pages: 443 pp
- ISBN: 978-0-571-23856-9
- Preceded by: Critique of Criminal Reason
- Followed by: A Visible Darkness

Days of Atonement is the second crime novel by Michael G Jacob and Daniela De Gregorio writing under the name of Michael Gregorio. Like its predecessor, Critique of Criminal Reason, it is set in East Prussia during the height of Napoleonic Wars, and once again chronicles the attempts of magistrate Hanno Stiffeniis to solve a murder mystery.
