= Catherine Hanley =

Australian historian

Catherine Hanley (born 1972) is a writer and researcher specialising in the Middle Ages.

== Biography ==
Hanley was born in Perth, Western Australia. She gained a degree and a PhD at the University of Sheffield and was a postdoctoral researcher there on the Partonopeus de Blois project. While working as an academic she published a number of articles on medieval warfare and its portrayal in contemporary narrative literature; she also wrote War and Combat 1150-1270: The Evidence from Old French Literature which was published by Boydell and Brewer in 2003. She was as a contributor to the Oxford Encyclopaedia of Medieval Warfare and Military Technology (Oxford University Press, 2010).

After leaving academia she started to write historical fiction, and is the author of a series of medieval murder mystery novels featuring Edwin Weaver as the central character. The novels are set against the backdrop of the baronial war in the early 13th century, when the nobles of England rebelled against King John and invited Prince Louis of France to take the throne, before some of them changed their minds following John’s death and the accession of his nine-year-old son Henry III. The books in the series, all published by The History Press, are:

- The Sins of the Father (2012) which was Editor’s Choice in Historical Novels Review.
- The Bloody City (2013)
- Whited Sepulchres (2014)
- Brother's Blood (2016)
- Give Up the Dead (2018)
- Cast the First Stone (2020)
- By the Edge of the Sword (2021)
- Blessed Are the Dead (2023)

In addition to fiction, Hanley also began writing popular non-fiction history. Her book Louis: The French Prince Who Invaded England (a biography of Louis VIII of France) was published by Yale University Press in 2016. It was well received, reviews calling it 'a captivating account' (Publishers Weekly), 'a fast-paced biography' (The Times Literary Supplement), and 'serious history, as well as a gripping and poignant story' (BBC History Magazine). Hanley wrote a biography of the Empress Matilda, Matilda: Empress, Queen, Warrior, which was published by Yale University Press in 2019. In 2022 she published Two Houses, Two Kingdoms: A History of France and England, 1100-1300, also with Yale University Press; the Times Literary Supplement noted that it was 'written with verve and based on impeccable scholarship'.

During the early 2000s, Hanley also worked as a cricket writer, publishing articles in the UK in Wisden Cricketers’ Almanack, Wisden Cricket Monthly and the website wisden.com, and in Australia in the magazine Inside Cricket and in the Wisden Cricketers’ Almanack Australia. She made a brief return to cricket writing in 2013 with some articles for the Wisden India website.
