= Diana Norman =

British author and journalist

- Born: Mary Diana Narracott; 25 August 1933; London, England
- Died: 27 January 2011 (aged 77); Datchworth, Hertfordshire, England
- Occupations: Author, journalist
- Spouse: Barry Norman (m. 1957)
- Children: 2

Mary Diana Norman (née Narracott; pen name, Ariana Franklin; 25 August 1933 – 27 January 2011) was a British author and journalist. She is best known for her historical crime fiction.

== Life and work ==
Norman was born in London. She was moved to Devon by her family to escape the Blitz. Her father was a journalist, and she followed this profession until moving to the countryside to "bring up two daughters, study medieval history, and write". She also published historical mystery novels under the pen name "Ariana Franklin", featuring the fictional medieval pathologist Adelia Aguilar.

Diana Norman was married to the film critic Barry Norman and they had two daughters, Samantha and Emma. She died on 27 January 2011, aged 77. Her life and marriage are the subject of memoirs published by Barry Norman in 2013 (See You in the Morning).

== Novels ==
=== Writing as Diana Norman ===
- Fitzempress' Law (1980), set in the reign of Henry II of England
- King of the Last Days (1981)
- The Morning Gift (1985)
- Daughter of Lîr (1988)
- Pirate Queen (1991), based on the life of the 16th-century Irish pirate Grace O'Malley
- The Vizard Mask (1994), set in Restoration London
- Shores of Darkness (1996)
- Blood Royal (1998)
- A Catch of Consequence (2002), Book 1 of the Makepeace Hedley series, set in the late-18th century against the backgrounds of the French revolution and the American war of independence
- Taking Liberties (2003), Book 2 of the Makepeace Hedley series
- The Sparks Fly Upward (2006), Book 3 of the Makepeace Hedley series

=== Writing as Ariana Franklin ===
- City of Shadows (2006), centred on the plot to pass off a psychiatric patient, Anna Anderson, as the Russian princess Anastasia Romanov
- Mistress of the Art of Death (2007), first book of the historical crime series featuring 12th-century medical examiner Adelia Aguilar; winner of the Ellis Peters Historical Dagger award from the British Crime Writers' Association
- The Death Maze (UK), published as The Serpent's Tale in the US (2008), a second Adelia Aguilar mystery
- Relics of the Dead (UK), published as Grave Goods in the US (2009), a third Adelia Aguilar mystery
- The Assassin's Prayer (UK), published as A Murderous Procession in the US (2010) the fourth Adelia Aguilar mystery; winner of the British Crime Writers' Association's Dagger in the Library award
- Winter Siege (2014/UK), published as The Siege Winter in the US (2015), a standalone set in 1141 during the conflict between King Stephen and the Empress Matilda. The writing was finished after her death by her daughter, Samantha Norman
- Death and the Maiden (2020) is the final novel in the 'Mistress of the Art of Death' series. The unfinished manuscript was completed by Samantha Norman

== Non-fiction ==
- The Stately Ghosts of England (1963, 1977)
- Road from Singapore (1970, 1979)
- Terrible Beauty: Life of Constance Markievicz, 1868–1927 (1987)
