= The Problem of the Old Gristmill =

- Short story by Edward D. Hoch
- Country: United States
- Language: English

Publication
- Publisher: Ellery Queen's Mystery Magazine
- Publication date: 1975

Chronology
The Problem of the Covered Bridge	The Problem of the Lobster Shack

"The Problem of the Old Gristmill" is a mystery short story by Edward D. Hoch. It is one of 68 stories featuring Dr. Sam Hawthorn, all of which were first published in Ellery Queen's Mystery Magazine. This story was first published in 1975 and was collected in Diagnosis Impossible: The Problems of Dr. Sam Hawthorne in 2000.

All the Hawthorn stories take place in the 1920s and 1930s, when Hawthorn was serving as a country doctor in the small New England town of Northmont, and are presented as being recalled by Hawthorn in his old age. The first story is set in 1922, when Hawthorn is just out of medical school, and the last is set in 1936.

"The Problem of the Old Gristmill" is the second story featuring Hawthorn, and one of the few that does not contain an impossible murder, although an "impossible crime" does occur.

== Plot summary ==
Old Dr. Sam tells the story of how everyone in town is sad to see Henry Cordwainer leave. Cordwainer, who lived in the old gristmill owned by Seth Hawkins and his mother, is a full-bearded naturalist, who has been writing a book, A Year in Snake Creek. Now that year is up and his book is finished he is leaving. When he first came, he was cold and uncaring, but when winter began his whole personality changed drastically, and he became helpful, even helping at the ice house. Sam and Seth help Cordwainer pack up his stuff, including his lock boxes with three dozen journals in them, and Seth reveals that his mother wants him to start up the gristmill (and also that Seth does not want to start it up). Sam does not think much about this, even when he sees Seth at the local cockfights that night.

The next morning everyone learns that the gristmill has been burned down, and Cordwainer has had his head bashed in. Sheriff Lens is brought in and suspicion falls on Seth -- but Seth was at the cockfight the night before. To complicate matters, Cordwainer's journals that were mailed to Boston in locked strong boxes, have disappeared. The strong boxes arrived, with a very small hole in the bottom, completely empty except for some sawdust. Sam attempts to prove Seth's innocence by injecting him with an experimental truth drug, "scopolamine". Sam proves that Seth could not have committed the murder, and begins to wonder about the sawdust that was found on the bottom of the strong boxes. When Sam works out the solution, Sam and Lens than drive to Albernathy, on Sam's urging. Here, they find the man they thought was Cordwainer, alive and well -- who is actually an escaped convict named Delos. Delos killed Cordwainer before winter, which explains the change in personality. He then impersonated him. The journals in the strong boxes were revealed to be blocks of ice, which explains the small holes and the traces of sawdust. The gristmill was set on fire in order to thaw Cordwainer's body, which had been frozen since winter.
