= Trinity Catholic High School, Woodford Green =

School in Woodford Green, Greater London, England

Trinity Catholic High School
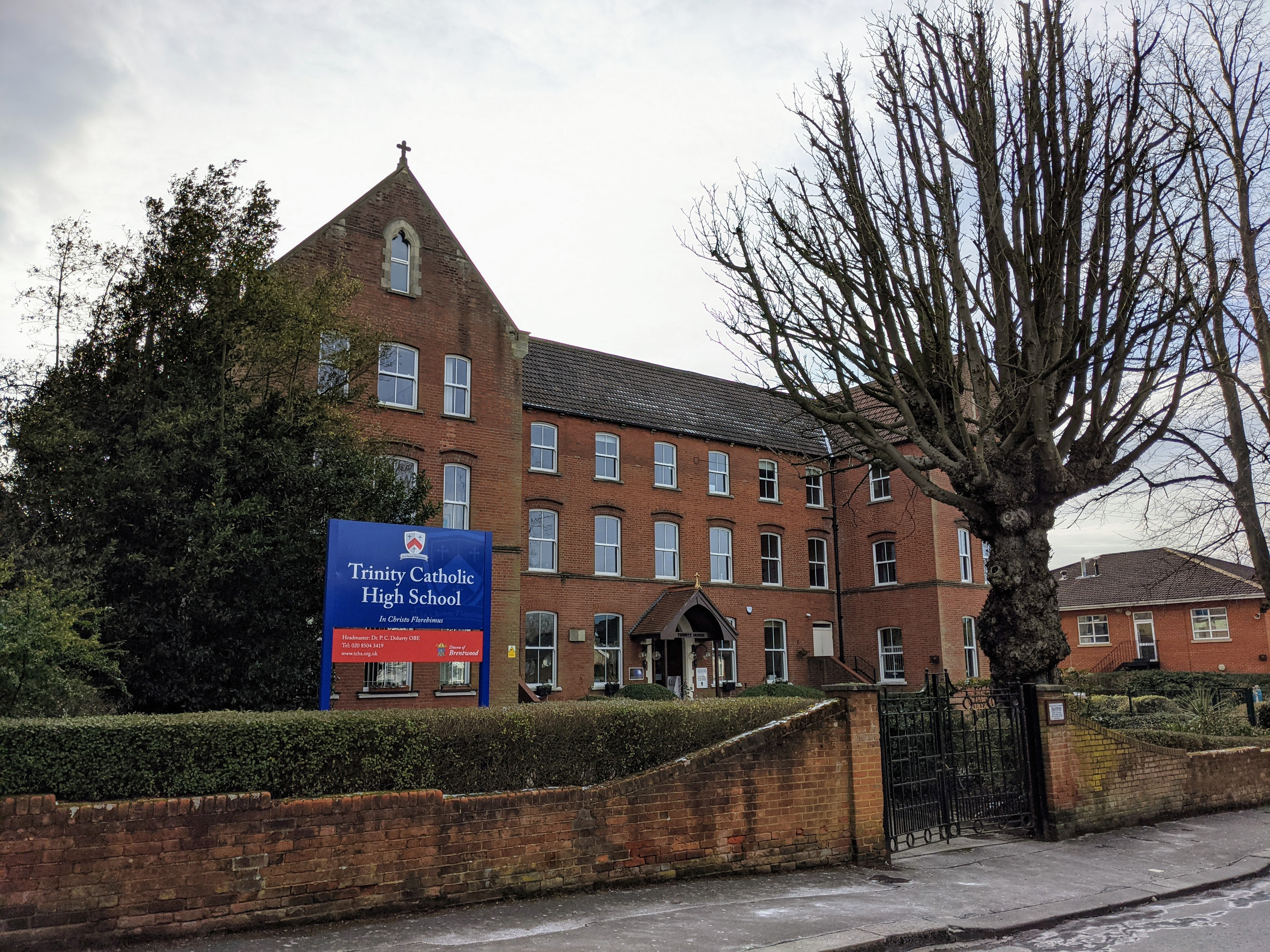
- Compassion, Vocation, Wisdom

Location
- Mornington Road; Woodford Green, Greater London, IG8 0TP; England; 51.616479°N 0.019917°E

Information
- Type: Voluntary aided school
- Motto: In Christo Florebimus (In Christ we shall flourish)
- Religious affiliation: Roman Catholic
- Established: 1976
- Local authority: Redbridge London Borough Council
- Oversight: Roman Catholic Diocese of Brentwood
- Department for Education URN: 102860 Tables
- Ofsted: Reports
- Headmaster: Declan Linnane
- Staff: 203
- Gender: Mixed
- Age range: 11–18
- Enrolment: 1,712 (2019)
- Capacity: 1,579
- Colours: Navy blue, red, white
- Website: www.tchs.org.uk

Trinity Catholic High School is an 11–18 mixed, Roman Catholic, voluntary aided school and sixth form in Woodford Green, Greater London, England. It was established in 1976 following the amalgamation of Holy Family Convent School (now Upper Site) and St Paul's Catholic Secondary School (now Lower Site). It is part of the Roman Catholic Diocese of Brentwood.

In May 1999, the Department for Education and Employment (DFEE) nominated it as a "Beacon School" to show good practice both locally and nationally.

== Notable alumni ==
- James Argent, television personality
- Nicholas Browne, cricketer
- Catherine Dalton, cricketer
- Meryl Fernandes, actress
- Matt Harrold, footballer
- Andrew Joslin, cricketer
- Daniel Lawrence, cricketer
- Louise Lombard, actress
- Gary Lucy, actor
- Christine Ohuruogu, athlete
- Kele Okereke, musician
- Tamzin Outhwaite, actress
- Darel Russell, footballer
- Peta Todd, glamour model
- Miranda Brawn, lawyer and philanthropist
- Conor Coventry, footballer
- Matt Ward, record producer and songwriter

== Notable staff ==
- Paul C. Doherty, former headmaster
- Michael Wilshaw, former deputy head
