= Stefanie Pintoff =

American novelist

Stefanie Pintoff is an American author of historical mystery novels.

== Work ==
Stefanie Pintoff’s books take place in New York City in the early 1900s. Her character Simon Ziele is a police detective who lost his fiancée in a steamship accident, and Alistair Sinclair is a talented and egotistical criminologist. Her work is known for intricate plots and historical details, with a focus on early criminal science.

Her book In the Shadow of Gotham won the Minotaur/Mystery Writers of America Award for "Best First Crime Novel", the 2010 Edgar Award for Best First Novel and a 2011 Washington Irving Book Award.

The 1904 General Slocum disaster played a prominent role in two of her novels: In the Shadow of Gotham and Secret of the White Rose.

== Bibliography ==
- In the Shadow of Gotham, Minotaur Books, 2009
- A Curtain Falls, Minotaur Books, 2010
- Secret of the White Rose, Minotaur Books, 2011
- Hostage Taker, Ballantine Books, 2015
- City on Edge, Bantam, 2016
