= Rosemary Aitken =

English author (born 1942)

- Born: 1942 (age 83–84); Cornwall
- Occupation: Author
- Writing career
- Genres: Historical novel; whodunnits

Rosemary Aitken (born 1942) is an English author, who has written a number of academic textbooks and historical novels under her own name, and a series of whodunnits set in Roman Britain under the pen name of Rosemary Rowe.

Her writings are similar to those of Philip Boast, Gloria Cook and Winston Graham.

== Biography ==
Rosemary Aitken was born in Penzance, Cornwall but spent much of her early life in New Zealand where she pursued higher education, obtaining a B.A. from Sydney University in 1961 and an M.A. with honors from Victoria University in 1962. Her professional career was spent teaching English Language and she has written a number of textbooks on this subject.

Her first historical novel, The Girl from Penvarris, was published in 1995, the first in a series set in a fictional Cornish village.

Under the name Rosemary Rowe she has written a series of historical mysteries, set in and around the Roman town of Glevum, (modern-day Gloucester). The detective in the stories, named Libertus, is a pavement-maker, whose expertise in mosaic patterns parallels his skill in resolving puzzling crimes.

After living and lecturing in Gloucestershire for many years, Aitken returned to Cornwall in 2007. She now resides in a wooded area near Truro and the Fal. She is the mother of two adult children and has grandchildren residing in both New Zealand and Cambridgeshire.

== Bibliography ==
=== Cornish Sagas ===
- The Girl from Penvarris (1995) ISBN 978-0752800653
- The Tinner's Daughter (1996) ISBN 978-1857976373
- Cornish Harvest (1998) ISBN 978-0752812106
- Stormy Waters (2000) ISBN 978-0727857286
- The Silent Shore (2001) ISBN 978-0727857439
- The Granite Cliffs (2002) ISBN 978-0727858542
- A Cornish Maid (2010) ISBN 978-1847511553
- Flowers for Miss Pengelly (2018) ISBN 978-0727893444
- The Cornish Blacksmiths Daughter (2022) ASIN B09Z69QZX4

=== Libertus Roman mysteries ===
1. The Germanicus Mosaic (1999) ISBN 978-0747261018
2. A Pattern of Blood (2000) ISBN 978-0747261025
3. Murder in the Forum (2001) ISBN 978-0747261032
4. The Chariots of Calyx (2002) ISBN 978-0747265191
5. The Legatus Mystery (2003) ISBN 978-0747269007
6. The Ghosts of Glevum (2004) ISBN 978-0755305162
7. Enemies of the Empire (2005) ISBN 978-0755305193
8. A Roman Ransom (2006) ISBN 978-0755327416
9. A Coin for the Ferryman (2007) ISBN 978-0755327430
10. Death at Pompeia's Wedding (2008) ISBN 978-0727866981
11. Requiem for a Slave (2010) ASIN B004ZGLDXI
12. The Vestal Vanishes (2011) ISBN 978-0727880291
13. A Whispering of Spies (2012) ISBN 978-1847514219
14. Dark Omens (2013) ISBN 978-0727882998
15. The Fateful Day (2014) ISBN 9780727884398
16. The Ides of June (2016) ISBN 978-0727894991
17. The Price of Freedom (2018) ASIN B077NL5B6F
18. A Prisoner of Privilege (2019) ASIN B07TVF168K
19. A Dreadful Destiny (2021) ASIN B09HKKZY9T

=== Novels ===
- Against the Tide (2004) ISBN 978-0727860293
- The Tregenza Girls (2006) ISBN 978-0727863966
- From Penvarris with Love (2008) ISBN 978-0727866271
- Flowers for Miss Pengelly (2012) ISBN 9780727882295

=== Textbooks ===
- Make up Your Mind (1982) ISBN 978-0333322017
- Teaching Tenses (2002) ISBN 978-0952280866
- Writing a Novel: A Practical Guide (2003) ISBN 978-1861266088
- Teach Yourself, Creative Writing Masterclass: Writing Crime Fiction (2014) ISBN 978-1473601369
