= Kurt Aust =

Danish-Norwegian writer (born 1955)

Kurt Østergaard
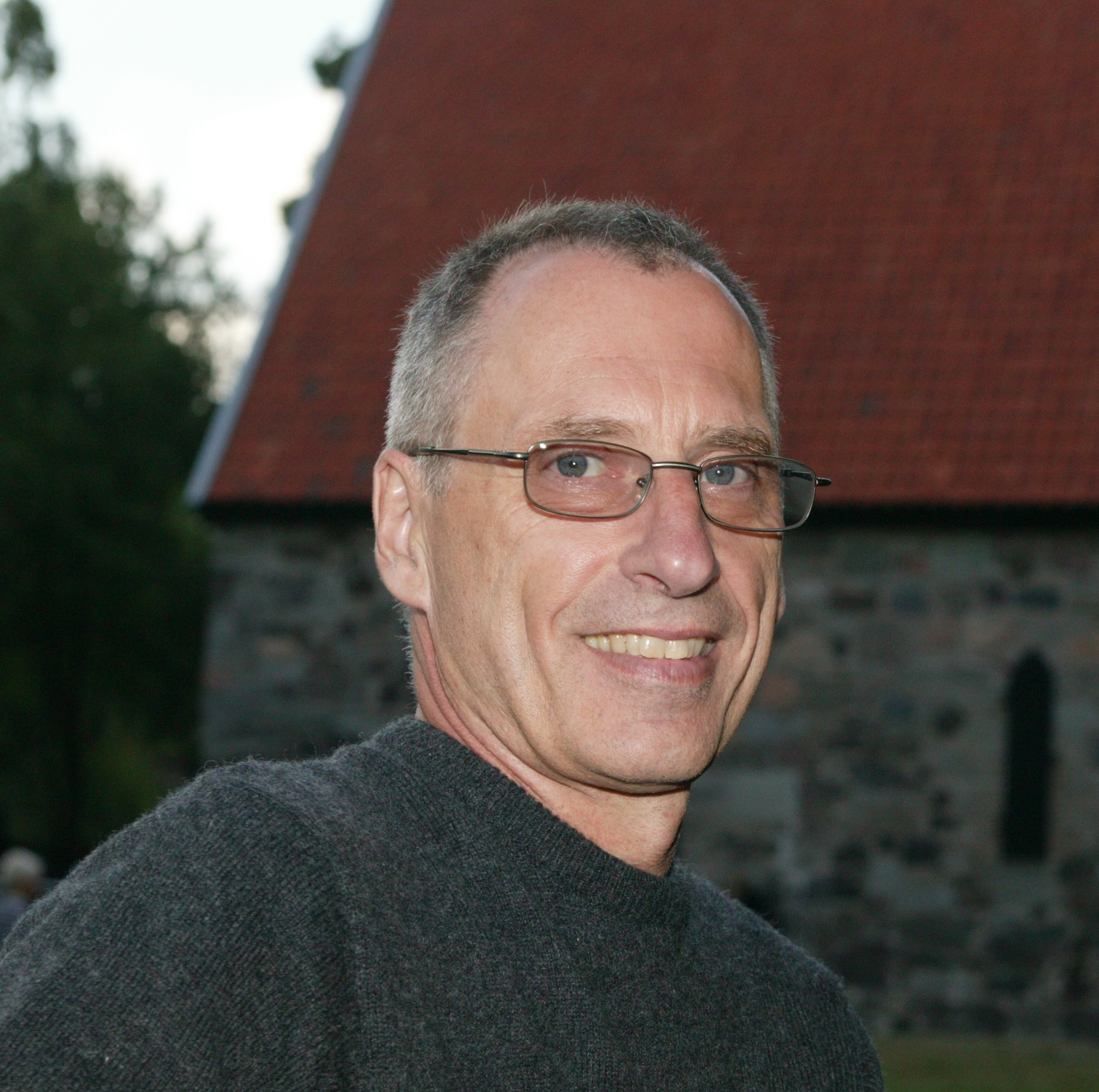
- Aust in 2006
- Born: 6 December 1955 (age 70)
- Occupations: Author, novelist
- Writing career
- Pen name: Kurt Aust
- Genre: Crime

Kurt Aust is a pseudonym for Kurt Østergaard (born 6 December 1955), a Danish-Norwegian author and freelance writer.

Østergaard trained as a teacher. He has been living in Horten in Norway since 1982.

Østergaard debuted using the name Aust as a novelist in 1999. Prior to this, he had written the script for a historically based cartoon on the slave ship Fredensborg.

He has written several historical crime novels based on Denmark–Norway around the beginning of the 18th century. The main characters in these novels are Professor Thomas af Boueberg of Copenhagen University and his Dr. Watson equivalent, the considerably less brilliant Norwegian Petter Hortten.

In 2006 he published his first contemporary novel, the thriller De usynlige brødre (The Invisible Brothers) (translated into 8 languages) and his first children's book Kasper & Måns. Den store kaosdagen (Kasper & Måns. The Great Day of Chaos).

Kurt Østergaard is married to the artist Kin Wessel (Ann-Carin Wessel). She has co-illustrated the cartoon about Fredensborg and the children's book Kasper & Måns. Den store kaosdagen.

== Bibliography ==
- 1997: Slaveskipet Fredensborg (cartoons, with Kin Wessel and Leif Salvesen)
- 1999: Vredens dag (Day of Wrath)
- 2001: Den tredje sannhet (The Third Truth, crime novel)
- 2003: Hjemsøkt (Afflicted, crime novel)
- 2004: Kongefrykt (A King's Fear, crime novel)
- 2006: De usynlige brødre (The Invisible Brothers, crime novel)
- 2006: Kasper & Måns. Den store kaosdagen (Kasper & Måns. The Great Day of Chaos, children's book, with Kin Wessel)
- 2008: Kaos og øyeblikkets renhet (Chaos and the Purity of the Moment, crime novel)
- 2009: Hevnens alkymi (The Alchemy of Revenge)
- 2010: Symboler & demoner (Symbols and Demons)

== Awards ==
- Aschehougs Debutant Endowment 1999, for Vredens dag
- Riverton Prize 2003, for Hjemsøkt
- Glass Key award 2004, for Hjemsøkt
- Sølvkniven - Randaberg crimeprize 2019, for Udyr
