= Constance O'Day-Flannery =

American writer

Constance O'Day-Flannery is an American author of romance novels.

== Biography ==
Constance O'Day-Flannery has never taken a writing course or attended college. She began writing when her son entered school. While reading romance novels during her recovery from a hysterectomy, O'Day-Flannery began to think about the type of book she would want to read. She finished her manuscript 18 months later and sold it quickly. Since then, she has published over 20 novels, all of which have appeared on a national best-seller list. Many of her novels are paranormal or time-travel romances. She has been awarded the Romantic Times BookClub Award for Best Time Travel for Timeswept Lovers and the Romantic Times BookClub Award for Best Contemporary Fantasy Romance, Second Chances.

In 2001, O'Day-Flannery took a hiatus from writing. She spent three years living in Ireland before returning to the United States and continuing her writing career.

O'Day-Flannery currently lives in Pennsylvania. She has two children.

== Bibliography ==
=== Paranormal ===
- Timeless Passion (1986)
- Timeswept Lovers (1987)
- Time-Kept Promises (1988)
- Time-Kissed Destiny (1990)

=== Novels ===
- Once in a Lifetime (1991)
- Second Chances (1992)
- A Time for Love (1994)
- The Gift (1994)
- Seasons (1995)
- Bewitched (1995)
- Sunsets (1996)
- This Time Forever (1998)
- Anywhere You Are (1999)
- Once and Forever (1999)
- Heaven on Earth (2000)
- Here and Now (2001)
- Time After Time (2001)
- Shifting Love (2004)
- Colliding Forces (2005)
- Best Laid Plans (2006)
- Twice in a Lifetime (2006)
- Old Friends (2007)

=== Omnibus ===
- Secret Loves (1994) (with Wendy Haley)
