= Cheryl Lanham =

American writer (born 1948)

Cheryl Lanham Arguile
- Born: Cheryl Lanham; November 10, 1948 (age 77); Richwood, West Virginia, U.S.
- Occupation: Writer
- Spouse: Richard James Arguile (m. 1976)
- Children: 2
- Writing career
- Pen name: Sarah Temple (romance novels); Emily Brightwell (mysteries); Cheryl Lanham (YA novels)
- Genres: Historical, historical mystery, romance
- Website: www.emilybrightwell.com

Cheryl Arguile (born November 10, 1948, in Richwood, West Virginia) is an American writer who also writes under her maiden name Cheryl Lanham and the pseudonyms Sarah Temple and Emily Brightwell.

== Personal life ==
Cheryl Lanham was born on November 10, 1948, in Richwood, West Virginia. In May 1976, she married Richard James Arguile. They have two children.

== Writing career ==
She has been published several times in the young adult novel genre (writing as Cheryl Lanham) and contemporary romance novels (writing as Sarah Temple).

As Emily Brightwell, she is the author of 41 titles in the Victorian murder mystery series that started with The Inspector and Mrs. Jeffries in February 1993.

The series has grown in popularity in recent years as each new mystery is published and as the earlier titles are reissued as three-book anthologies. Her mystery Mrs. Jeffries and The One Who Got Away made the New York Times Mass Market Fiction Bestseller List for February 22, 2015. Mrs. Jeffries Turns the Tide made the New York Times Mass Market Fiction Bestseller List for May 26, 2013. Mrs. Jeffries Defends Her Own, Emily Brightwell's previous paperback original mystery, made the New York Times Mass Market Fiction Bestseller List in May 2012.

== Bibliography ==
=== As Sarah Temple ===
==== Single novels ====
- Kindred Spirits (1990)
- Lifeline (1991)
- The Liberation of Layla (1992)

=== As Emily Brightwell ===
with Richard Arguile

AIN'T THIS AMERICA (November 2026)

==== Mrs. Jeffries series ====
1. The Inspector and Mrs. Jeffries (1993) (A)
2. Mrs. Jeffries Dusts for Clues (1993) (A)
3. The Ghost and Mrs. Jeffries (1993) (A)
4. Mrs. Jeffries Takes Stock (1994) (B)
5. Mrs. Jeffries on the Ball (1994) (B)
6. Mrs. Jeffries on the Trail (1995) (B)
7. Mrs. Jeffries Plays the Cook (1995) (C)
8. Mrs. Jeffries and the Missing Alibi (1996) (C)
9. Mrs. Jeffries Stands Corrected (1996) (C)
10. Mrs. Jeffries Takes the Stage (1997) (D)
11. Mrs. Jeffries Questions the Answer (1997) (D)
12. Mrs. Jeffries Reveals Her Art (1998) (D)
13. Mrs. Jeffries Takes the Cake (1998) (E)
14. Mrs. Jeffries Rocks the Boat (1999) (E)
15. Mrs. Jeffries Weeds the Plot (2000) (E)
16. Mrs. Jeffries Pinches the Post (2001) (F)
17. Mrs. Jeffries Pleads Her Case (2003) (F)
18. Mrs. Jeffries Sweeps the Chimney (2004) (F)
19. Mrs. Jeffries Stalks the Hunter (2004)
20. Mrs. Jeffries and the Silent Knight (2005)
21. Mrs. Jeffries Appeals the Verdict (2006)
22. Mrs. Jeffries and the Best Laid Plans (2007)
23. Mrs. Jeffries and the Feast of St. Stephen (2007)
24. Mrs. Jeffries Holds the Trump (2008)
25. Mrs. Jeffries In the Nick of Time (2009)
26. Mrs. Jeffries and the Yuletide Weddings (2009)
27. Mrs. Jeffries Speaks Her Mind (2010)
28. Mrs. Jeffries Forges Ahead (2011)
29. Mrs. Jeffries and the Mistletoe Mix-Up (2011)
30. Mrs. Jeffries Defends Her Own (2012)
31. Mrs. Jeffries Turns the Tide (2013)
32. Mrs. Jeffries and the Merry Gentlemen (2013)
33. Mrs. Jeffries and the One Who Got Away (2015)
34. Mrs. Jeffries Wins the Prize (2016)
35. Mrs. Jeffries Rights a Wrong (2017)
36. Mrs. Jeffries and the Three Wise Women (2017)
37. Mrs. Jeffries Delivers the Goods (2019)
38. Mrs. Jeffries and the Alms of the Angel (2019)
39. Mrs. Jeffries Demands Justice (2021)
40. Mrs. Jeffries and the Midwinter Murders (11/2021)
41. Mrs. Jeffries Aims to Win (08/2023)1

==== Mrs. Jeffries reprint anthology series ====
1. (A) All three titles now an anthology trade paperback: Mrs. Jeffries Learns the Trade
2. (B) All three titles now an anthology trade paperback: Mrs. Jeffries Takes A Second Look
3. (C) All three titles now an anthology trade paperback: Mrs. Jeffries Takes Tea at Three
4. (D) All three titles now an anthology trade paperback: Mrs. Jeffries Sallies Forth
5. (E) All three titles now an anthology trade paperback: Mrs. Jeffries Pleads the Fifth
6. (F) All three titles now an anthology trade paperback: Mrs. Jeffries Serves at Six

=== As Cheryl Lanham ===
==== Dear Diary series multi-author ====
2. Remember Me (1996)
5. Dying Young (2000)
6. Fighting Back (2000)

==== Life at Sixteen series multi-author ====
2. Good Intentions (1998)
3. No Guarantees (1997)
4. Second Best (1997)

==== Anthologies in collaboration ====
- Secret Loves: Irish Eyes + Masquerade + Midnight Daydreams + Behind Closed Doors (1994) (with Constance O'Day-Flannery, Wendy Haley, and Catherine Palmer
