= Murder in the Place of Anubis =

1994 novel by Lynda Suzanne Robinson

- Author: Lynda Suzanne Robinson
- Language: English
- Genre: Mystery, Historical Fiction
- Publisher: Walker & Company
- Publication date: 1994
- Publication place: USA
- Media type: Print (hardback and paperback)
- Pages: 218
- ISBN: 9780802732491
- Followed by: Murder at the God's Gate

Murder in the Place of Anubis is a 1994 debut novel by Lynda Suzanne Robinson. It was originally published by Walker & Company. The novel is a historical fiction, murder mystery about a fictitious servant of Tutankhamun, tasked with solving a murder. It would be followed by five sequels in The Lord Meren series, released between 1995 and 2001.

== Plot ==
During the reign of Tutankhamun, a scribe named Hormin is discovered murdered at the place of embalming. The pharaoh orders his "eyes and ears", Lord Meren, to uncover the perpetrator, before the incident can be used to undermine his royal authority. Meren visits Hormin's workplace and family and is appalled to discover that seemingly everyone hated him.

== Reception and awards ==
According to Publishers Weekly, "This exceptional debut melds ancient Egyptian religious beliefs and practices with court intrigue to produce a riveting mystery." Kirkus Reviews compared it favorably to Agatha Christie's Death Comes as the End. It was a finalist for the 1995 Macavity Awards.
