= Critique of Criminal Reason =

Book by Michael Gregorio, 2006

- Author: Michael Gregorio
- Language: English
- Genre: Crime novel
- Publisher: Faber and Faber
- Publication date: 6 July 2006
- Publication place: United Kingdom
- Media type: Print (Paperback)
- Pages: 396 pp
- ISBN: 978-0-571-22927-7
- OCLC: 65203266
- Followed by: Days of Atonement

Critique of Criminal Reason is an English language crime novel written by Michael Gregorio, the pseudonym of Michael G. Jacob and Daniela De Gregorio, two scholars teaching in Spoleto, Italy. It was first published by Faber & Faber and St. Martin's Press. It is set in Königsberg, during the height of Napoleonic Wars, in 1804.

It details the attempts of a young Prussian magistrate, named Hanno Stiffeniis, to catch a murderer who has committed a series of grotesque and unsettling murders in the city. He is aided in the task by a sergeant of the local police, Herr Köch, and together they create a pair of heroes slightly reminiscent of the Sherlock Holmes and Dr. Watson tandem. Of note is the historical character of Immanuel Kant, who also takes an important part in the investigation.

The novel is the first of a series of novels illustrating Hanno Stiffeniis' exploits. It was followed by Days of Atonement, A Visible Darkness and Unholy Awakening.

== Plot ==
Years after Immanuel Kant published his Critique of Pure Reason but now rumours say that the philosopher is about to release another book. This book will be different than all others because it will examine the concept of serial killers.

Meanwhile the German city of Königsberg, where Kant lives, is gripped by a series of murders. Prosecutor Hanno Stiffeniis is ordered by King Frederick William III himself to investigate the crimes and bring the murderer to justice. Stiffeniis is aided in his quest by Immanuel Kant, as well as a local police sergeant.
