= Lauren Haney =

American novelist (1936–2022)

Betty Winkelman (1936 – 2022), better known by the pen name Lauren Haney, was an American mystery novelist.

== Biography ==
Starting as a government typist at the age of 18, Haney worked her way up to, ultimately, senior technical writer/editor in the aerospace and international construction industries. In the late 1980s she became interested in writing fiction, where she drew on her interest in and knowledge of ancient Egypt for a setting. Her eight published historical mystery novels are set during the joint reign of Hatshepsut and Thutmose III, of pharaonic Egypt's 18th Dynasty. The earlier books take place in frontier settlements along the Nile in Lower Nubia, where Lieutenant Bak and his troop of Medjay police struggle to keep order and capture offenders against the Lady Maat. Later novels are set at various locales in ancient Egypt.

Haney's novels have been published in German, English and French, and in the Czech Republic. She lived in Missouri, New York, Los Angeles, New Mexico and in Northern California. She traveled abroad frequently, especially to the Middle East, primarily Egypt, and contributed articles and book reviews to KMT and Ancient Egypt magazines. Her short story Happy Birthday, Kid, won Second Prize in an international short story contest. Her short story Murder in the Land of Wawat was nominated for an Anthony award.

== Works ==
=== Lieutenant Bak series (Mystery of Ancient Egypt) ===
- The Right Hand of Amon – La main droite d'Amon en Fr (1997)
- A Face Turned Backward – Le visage de Maât en Fr (1999)
- A Vile Justice – Le ventre d'Apopis en Fr (1999)
- A Curse of Silence – Sous l’œil d'Horus en Fr (2000)
- A Place of Darkness – Le souffle de Seth en Fr (2001)
- A Cruel Deceit – Le sang de Thot en Fr (2002)
- Flesh of the God (2003)
- A Path of Shadows – L'ombre d'Hathor en Fr (2003)
- Parut en FR aux édition Grands Détectives 10/18

=== Short stories ===
- A Matter of Business (1997), in KMT: A Modern Journal of Ancient Egypt, 8-3, Fall
- Happy Birthday, Kid (2000), in anthology of prize winners World Wide Writers 3–14, ed. Frederick E. Smith
- Murder in the Land of Wawat (2002) in anthology The Mammoth Book of Egyptian Whodunnits, ed. Mike Askley
- Onate's Foot (2009) in anthology Murder Past, Murder Present, ed. R. Barri Flowers and Jan Grape
- A Certain and Untimely Death (2012) in anthology Murder Here, Murder There, ed. R. Barri Flowers and Jan Grape

=== Nonfiction ===
- Buhen: Blueprints of an Egyptian Fortress, KMT 6:2, Summer 1995
- Spacious & Comfortable Dwellings: Homes of the Nobles at Akhetaten, KMT 10:2, Summer 1999
- Akh Isut Nebhepetre, The Mortuary Complex at Deir el Bahari of Nebhepetre Montuhotep, KMT 12:3, Fall 2001
- Ancient Egypt 101; A Quick Refresher Course, Amelia Peabody's Egypt: a Compendium, 2003
- The Belly of Stones: Ancient Egypt's Southern Frontier, Ancient Egypt 10:4, Feb/Mar 2010
- Royal Cemeteries of Nubia, Ancient Egypt 14:3, Dec 2013/Jan 2014
- Thutmose III the Builder: The Mansions of Millions of Years, Ancient Egypt 15:1, August/September 2014
- Old Kingdom Settlement in Nubia, Ancient Egypt 16:6, June/July 2016
- Serabit el-Khadim: The Turquoise Mountain, Ancient Egypt 18:2, October/November 2017

=== Book reviews ===
- Book Report: Stuart Tyson Smith, Askut in Nubia: The Economics and Ideology of Egyptian Imperialism in the Second Millennium B.C., KMT 7:2, Summer 1996
- Book Shelf: Peter Lacovara, The New Kingdom Royal City (B.Winkelman), KMT 9:2, Summer 1998
- Book Shelf: Dietrich Wildung, ed., Sudan: Ancient Kingdoms of the Nile (Betty Winkelman), KMT 9:3, Fall 1998
- Book Shelf: Florence Dunn Friedman, ed., Gifts of the Nile: Ancient Egyptian Faience (B. Winkelman), KMT 10:1, Spring 1999
- Book Shelf: Joyce Tyldesley, Judgement of the Pharaoh: Crime and Punishment in Ancient Egypt (Betty Winkelman), KMT 12:1, Spring 2001

== Sources ==
- "Lynda S. Robinson and Lauren Haney: Detection in the Land of Mysteries," by Rita Rippetoe, in The Detective as Historian: History and Art in Historical Crime Fiction, Volume 1, edited by Ray Broadus Browne, Lawrence A. Kreiser
- The Mammoth Book of Egyptian Whodunnits, Mike Ashley
