= Lillian de la Torre =

American novelist

- Born: Lillian de la Torre Bueno; March 15, 1902; Manhattan, New York, U.S.
- Died: September 13, 1993 (aged 91); Colorado Springs, Colorado, U.S.
- Education: New Rochelle College, Columbia, Harvard-Radcliffe
- Occupation: Author
- Spouse: George McCue (d. 1984)
- Writing career
- Pen name: Lillian de la Torre
- Language: English
- Genre: Historical mystery

Lillian de la Torre Bueno McCue (née Bueno; pen name, Lillian de la Torre; March 15, 1902 – September 13, 1993) was an American novelist and a prolific writer of historical mysteries. She served as President of the Mystery Writers of America.

== Biography ==
Born in Manhattan in 1902, de la Torre received master's degrees from Columbia University and Harvard. Her first novel was Elizabeth Is Missing, or Truth Triumphant, published by Knopf in 1945.

Her most popular works were the Dr. Sam: Johnson, Detector series of 33 detective stories that cast 18th century literary figures Samuel Johnson and James Boswell into Sherlock Holmes and Dr. Watson roles. This series, which de la Torre began in 1943 with The Great Seal of England, is one of the earliest examples of the historical mystery, a literary genre which combines historical fiction and the whodunit/detective story.

She also wrote numerous books, short stories for Ellery Queen's Mystery Magazine, reviews for The New York Times Book Review, poetry and plays. She adapted her play Goodbye, Miss Lizzie Borden for an episode of the CBS Radio anthology series Suspense in 1955. The following year, the play was adapted for TV by Robert C. Dennis as the Alfred Hitchcock Presents episode, "The Older Sister". De la Torre was a President of the Mystery Writers of America, and was nominated for an Edgar Award for Best Fact Crime for The Truth about Belle Gunness (1955).

She died in 1993 at the age of 91. She was predeceased by her husband George McCue.

== Selected works ==
=== Novels ===
- 'Elizabeth is Missing', Or, Truth Triumphant: An Eighteenth Century Mystery (1945)
- The Heir of Douglas (1953)
- The Truth about Belle Gunness (1955)
- The Actress (1957)

=== Short story collections ===
- Dr. Sam: Johnson, Detector (1948)
- The Detections of Dr. Sam: Johnson (1960)
- The Return of Dr. Sam: Johnson, Detector (1985)
- The Exploits of Dr. Sam: Johnson, Detector (1987)

=== Plays ===
- Goodbye, Miss Lizzie Borden

=== Non Fiction ===
- Villainy Detected. Being a collection of the most sensational, true crimes of Britain in the Years 1660–1800 (1947)
