= Margaret Campbell Barnes =

English writer

- Born: Margaret Campbell Wood; 27 February 1891; Rotherfield, England
- Died: 1 April 1963 (aged 72); Yarmouth, Isle of Wight
- Occupation: Writer (novelist)
- Spouse: George Alfred Campbell Barnes (m. 1917)
- Children: 2
- Writing career
- Period: 20th century
- Genre: Historical fiction

Margaret Campbell Barnes (27 February 1891 – 1 April 1963) was an English writer of short-stories and historical fiction.

== Biography ==
Margaret Campbell Wood was born on 27 February 1891 in Rotherfield, England, UK. She was the youngest of ten children. She grew up in the Sussex countryside and was educated in private schools in London and Paris. She started writing early in her life even before she met and married George Alfred Campbell Barnes in 1917. She worked as a buyer of silent films and translated film titles for an agency, Curtis Brown Ltd. She also did some travel writing.

She published numerous short stories over the next 25 years in several magazines. During World War II she served as an ambulance driver in the streets of London. In 1944 at the behest of her agent, she started writing historical novels. By the time of her death she had completed ten books. Many were bestsellers and all told about 2 million copies have been sold.

Barnes and her husband raised two sons, one of whom was killed fighting in France in 1944. The loss affected her deeply and influenced some of her later writing. In 1945 the couple bought a cottage on the Isle of Wight and she lived there until she died in 1963.

== Works ==
List of historical fiction works by Margaret Campbell Barnes, including subjects and themes:

- Within The Hollow Crown (1941) - Richard II of England; includes the Warbeck plot
- Brief Gaudy Hour (1944) - Anne Boleyn
- Like Us, They Lived (1944) (also titled: The Passionate Brood, and dedicated to her dead son) - Blondel de Nesle, Berengaria of Navarre
- My Lady Of Cleves (1946) (also titled: The King's Choice) - Anne of Cleves
- With All My Heart (1951) - Catherine of Braganza, Charles II of England
- The Tudor Rose (1953) - Elizabeth of York and the Princes in the Tower
- Mary Of Carisbrooke (1956) - Charles I of England
- Isabel The Fair (1957) - Isabella of France
- King's Fool (1959) - Henry VIII
- The King's Bed (1962) - about a fictional illegitimate son of Richard III of England.
- Lady On The Coin (1963) (with Hebe Elsna) - Frances Stewart, Duchess of Richmond
