= Candace Robb =

American historical novelist (born 1950)

Candace Robb (born 1950) is an American historical novelist whose works are set in medieval England. She has also written under the pen name Emma Campion.

== Biography ==
Candace Robb was born in North Carolina, grew up in Ohio, and now lives in Seattle, Washington, with her husband. After receiving an education in Catholic schools, Robb went on to study and research medieval history for many years. In an interview, she said, "I did my graduate work in English literature with a strong concentration in medieval and Anglo-Saxon literature and history". After completing her master's degree at the University of Cincinnati in Ohio, she began the Ph.D. programme but did not complete her dissertation.

Before turning to fiction writing, she worked as an editor for scientific publications.

She strives for accuracy of historical events, which are the backdrop for her fictional characters. Kirkus Reviews said that "Robb puts the history back into historical mystery".

Robb divides her time between the American Pacific Northwest and the UK, frequently spending time in Scotland and in York to research her books.

== Selected works ==
=== Owen Archer series ===
1. The Apothecary Rose (1993)
2. The Lady Chapel (1994)
3. The Nun's Tale (1995)
4. The King's Bishop (1996)
5. The Riddle of St. Leonard's (1997)
6. A Gift of Sanctuary (1998)
7. A Spy for the Redeemer (2002)
8. The Cross-Legged Knight (2002)
9. The Guilt of Innocents (2007)
10. A Vigil of Spies (2008)
11. The Bone Jar (2016, novella)
12. A Conspiracy of Wolves (2019)
13. A Choir of Crows (2020)
14. The Riverwoman's Dragon (2021)
15. A Fox in the Fold (2022)

=== Margaret Kerr series ===
1. A Trust Betrayed (2000)
2. The Fire in the Flint (2003)
3. A Cruel Courtship (2004)

=== As Emma Campion ===
1. The King's Mistress (2010)
2. A Triple Knot (2014)

=== Kate Clifford series ===
1. The Service of the Dead (2016)
2. A Twisted Vengeance (2017)
3. A Murdered Peace (2018)
