= Kate Sedley =

English novelist (1926–2022)

Brenda Clarke
- Born: Brenda Margaret Lilian Honeyman; 30 July 1926; Bristol, England
- Died: 28 February 2022 (aged 95)
- Education: Cambridge University
- Occupation: Author
- Spouse: Ronald John Clarke
- Writing career
- Pen name: Kate Sedley; Brenda Honeyman
- Language: English
- Genre: Historical crime novels

Brenda Margaret Lilian Clarke (née Honeyman, 30 July 1926 – 28 February 2022), better known by the pen-name of Kate Sedley, was an English historical novelist.

She was born in Bristol in 1926 and educated at The Red Maids' School, Westbury-on-Trym. She was married and had a son and a daughter, and three grandchildren. Her medieval historical whodunnits feature Roger the Chapman, who has given up a monk's cell for the freedom of peddling his wares on the road. She died on 28 February 2022, at the age of 95.

== Roger the Chapman series ==
Set in 15th-century Great Britain:

1. Death and the Chapman (1991)
2. The Plymouth Cloak (1992)
3. The Hanged Man aka The Weaver's Tale (1993)
4. The Holy Innocents (1994)
5. The Eve of Saint Hyacinth (1995)
6. The Wicked Winter (1995)
7. The Brothers of Glastonbury (1997)
8. The Weaver's Inheritance (1998)
9. The Saint John's Fern (1999)
10. The Goldsmith's Daughter (2001)
11. The Lammas Feast (2002)
12. Nine Men Dancing (2003)
13. The Midsummer Rose (2004)
14. The Burgundian's Tale (2005)
15. Prodigal Son (2006)
16. The Three Kings of Cologne (2007)
17. The Green Man (2008)
18. The Dance of Death (2009)
19. The Wheel of Fate (2010)
20. The Midsummer Crown (2011)
21. The Tintern Treasure (2012)
22. The Christmas Wassail (2013)

== As Brenda Honeyman ==
- The Kingmaker (1969)
- Richmond and Elizabeth (1970)
- Harry the King (1971) aka The Warrior King as Brenda Clarke
- Brother Bedford (1972)
- Good Duke Humphrey (1973)
- The King's Minions (1974)
- The Queen and Mortimer (1974)
- Edward the Warrior (1975)
- All the King's Sons (1976)
- The Golden Griffin (1976)
- At the King's Court (1977)
- The King's Tale (1977)
- Macbeth, King of Scots (1977)
- Emma, the Queen (1978)
- Harold of the English (1979)

== As Brenda Clarke ==
- Glass Island (1978)
- The Lofty Banners (1979) aka For King and Country
- Far Morning (1982)
- All Through the Day (1983)
- A Rose in May (1984)
- Three Women (1985)
- Winter Landscape (1986)
- Under Heaven (1988)
- Equal Chance (1989)
- Sisters and Lovers (1990)
- Beyond the World (1991)
- Riches of the Heart (1991)
- A Durable Fire (1993)
- Sweet Auburn (1995)
- Richard Plantagenet (1997)
- Last of the Barons (1998)
- The Warrior King (1998) aka Harry the King as Brenda Honeyman
- A Royal Alliance (1998)
