= Michael Jecks =

British historical mystery novel author (born 1960)

- Born: 1960 (age 65–66); Surrey, England
- Occupation: Novelist
- Writing career
- Language: English
- Genre: Historical crime novels
- Website: www.michaeljecks.co.uk

Michael Jecks (born 1960) is an English writer of historical mystery novels.

== Early life ==
The son of an actuary, and the fourth of four brothers, Jecks worked in the computer industry before becoming a novelist full-time in 1994 after he was fired from his last position. He, his wife, daughter and son live in northern Dartmoor.

== Career ==
Jecks has written a series of novels featuring Sir Baldwin Furnshill, a former Knight Templar, and his friend Simon Puttock, Bailiff of Lydford Castle. He founded The Medieval Murderers, a speaking and entertainment group of historical writers including Bernard Knight, Ian Morson, Susanna Gregory, Phillip Gooden and CJ Sansom. The group has developed to collaborate on their books written as linked novellas, each book with a consistent theme, under the brand of The Medieval Murderers. More recently he helped create the Historical Writers' Association.

A member of the Society of Authors and Royal Literary Society, Jecks was the Chairman of the Crime Writers' Association in 2004–05. In 2005 he became a member of the Detection Club. From 1998 he organised the CWA Debut Dagger competition for two years, helping unpublished authors to win their first contracts. He was shortlisted for the Theakston's Old Peculiar Best Novel of the Year prize in 2007. He also judged the CWA/Ian Fleming Steel Dagger Award for three years.

Jecks speaks at literary festivals and historical meetings, at which he talks with Ian Mortimer, the historian, as well as Medieval Murderers. He helped create the Conway Stewart Detection Collection with a pen named for him. In 2014 he was the Grand Master of the Krewe of Little Rascals parade, the first parade of the New Orleans Mardi Gras. In the same year he was invited to be the International Guest of Honour at the Toronto Bloody Words Festival.

Jecks has embarked on a trilogy of Hundred Years' War stories with Simon and Schuster UK. The first, Fields of Glory, was published in 2014. The second, Blood on the Sand, was published in June 2015. He also has a modern spy thriller published with Kindle, Act of Vengeance, and two short story collections: No One Can Hear You Scream and For The Love of Old Bones.

== Bibliography ==
=== Knights Templar Mysteries ===
1. The Last Templar (March 1995)
2. The Merchant's Partner (November 1995)
3. A Moorland Hanging (May 1996)
4. The Crediton Killings (June 1997)
5. The Abbot's Gibbet (April 1998)
6. The Leper's Return (November 1998)
7. Squire Throwleigh's Heir (June 1999)
8. Belladonna at Belstone (December 1999)
9. The Traitor of St. Giles (May 2000)
10. The Boy Bishop's Glovemaker (December 2000)
11. The Tournament of Blood (June 2001)
12. The Sticklepath Strangler (November 2001)
13. The Devil's Acolyte (June 2002)
14. The Mad Monk of Gidleigh (December 2002)
15. The Templar's Penance (June 2003)
16. The Outlaws of Ennor (January 2004)
17. The Tolls of Death (May 2004)
18. The Chapel of Bones (December 2004)
19. The Butcher of St Peter's (May 2005)
20. A Friar's Bloodfeud (June 2006)
21. The Death Ship of Dartmouth (November 2006)
22. The Malice of Unnatural Death (December 2006)
23. Dispensation of Death (June 2007)
24. The Templar, The Queen and Her Lover (December 2007)
25. The Prophecy of Death (June 2008)
26. King of Thieves (November 2008)
27. No Law in the Land (June 2009)
28. The Bishop Must Die (November 2009)
29. The Oath (2010)
30. King's Gold (2011)
31. City of Fiends (7 June 2012)
32. Templar's Acre (September 2013)

=== Hundred Years War ===
1. Fields of Glory (June 2014)
2. Blood on the Sand (June 2015)
3. Blood of the Innocents (June 2016)

=== Bloody Mary / Jack Blackjack Series ===
1. Rebellion's Message (May 2016)
2. A Murder Too Soon (May 2017)
3. A Missed Murder
4. The Dead Don't Wait
5. Death Comes Hot
6. The Moorland Murderers
7. The Merchant Murderers
8. Murdering the Messenger

=== The Medieval Murderers ===
1. The Tainted Relic (May 2005)
2. Sword of Shame (June 2006)
3. House of Shadows (June 2007)
4. The Lost Prophecies (June 2008)
5. King Arthur's Bones (2009)
6. Sacred Stone (2010)
7. Hill of Bones (2011)
8. The First Murder (2012)
9. The False Virgin (2013)
10. The Deadliest Sin (2014)

=== Short story collections ===
1. No One Can Hear You Scream (2012)
2. For The Love of Old Bones (2012)

=== ebook only ===
1. Act of Vengeance (2012)
