= Paul C. Doherty =

British educator and author

Paul Doherty OBE
- Born: 21 September 1946 (age 80); Middlesbrough, Yorkshire, England
- Education: Liverpool University; Exeter College, Oxford
- Occupation: Headmaster
- Spouse: Carla Lynn Corbitt (died 2016)
- Writing career
- Pen name: Anna Apostolou; Michael Clynes; Ann Dukthas; C.L. Grace; Paul Harding; Vanessa Alexander
- Language: English
- Years active: 1985-present
- Genres: Historical mystery novels, non-fiction
- Website: www.paulcdoherty.com

Paul Charles Dominic Doherty (born 21 September 1946) is an English author, educator, lecturer and historian. He was the Headmaster of Trinity Catholic High School in London, England. Doherty is a prolific writer, has produced dozens of historical novels and a number of nonfiction history books.

== Biography ==
Doherty was born in 1946 and spent his early years in Middlesbrough. After A-levels, he went to Ushaw College, Durham for three years to study for the Catholic priesthood, which he did not pursue. He attended Liverpool University where he gained a First Class Honours Degree in History and at Exeter College, Oxford, where he received a doctorate for his thesis on Edward II. Doherty is a historian who lectures for a number of organisations, particularly on historical mysteries.

In 1981 he was appointed Headmaster at Trinity Catholic High School in Woodford Green, but he retired in 2025. In 2003 he was appointed as Interim Headteacher of King Solomon High School, after Jo Shooter left. He was awarded an Order of the British Empire for his services to education in 2011.

== Literary career ==
Doherty has published several series of historical mystery set in the Middle Ages, Classical, Greek, Ancient Egyptian and other periods. He writes both fiction and non-fiction under his own name, as well as under the pen-names Anna Apostolou, Michael Clynes, Ann Dukthas, C. L. Grace, Paul Harding, and Vanessa Alexander.

According to his website, He has written 100 published books which have been printed in multiple languages and published around much of the world. His works include The Sorrowful Mysteries of Brother Athelstan, the Hugh Corbett medieval mysteries, and the Canterbury Tales of Mystery and Murder, which are listed below. As "Michael Clynes", Doherty wrote the Roger Shallot mysteries, set in the era of Henry VIII.

In a Doherty interview with Michael Shankland, the latter says of Doherty: "I admire how this writer can use the medium of a novel to demonstrate a deep knowledge of the complex working of early 14th-century diplomacy and espionage. Paul C. Doherty seems to be one of the few writers focusing on the Hundred Years' War who understands the importance of the relationship between England and Gascony during this era".

A review of The Horus Killings at reviewingtheevidence.com opines that Doherty maintains a balance between historical description and the action of the plot on perfect pitch. "The mix is near perfect. The descriptive passages enhance the story, allowing the reader to vividly visualize an unfamiliar setting without detracting from the page-turning pace desirable in a light mystery." Harriet Klausner states in her review of this same book that "Ancient historical fiction/ mystery readers, especially Egyptologists, will cherish this novel."

A 2009 review by Mike Ripley, himself an acclaimed author and regular contributor to SHOTS Crime and Mystery magazine, states of Doherty's book The Spies of Sobeck:

"A very wise literary agent (and there are some) once told me that the trick with historical mysteries was to hook the reader early on with the mystery and then give them the history lesson. They know the lesson is coming but they want to be lured, almost fooled, into listening to it. Paul Doherty goes out of his way to break this rule. His latest novel and the seventh in his 'Ancient Egyptian Mysteries' series, "The Spies of Sobeck" starts (and ends) with historical notes by the author; there's also a map and a list of characters and their position in the hierarchy of Egypt in 1477BC. So the reader is left in no doubt that they are in for a history lesson and they get one; and it is the positive master class we have come to expect from Paul Doherty. This is history red in tooth and claw and Doherty has proved, in more than fifty novels over a variety of historical settings, that when he gives a history lesson, readers sit up straight and pay attention."

On 18 April 1998, Doherty was included in the Times' "Murder They Write: 100 masters of crime" supplement. The list, compiled by book critics and authors, included Sir Arthur Conan Doyle, Agatha Christie and Raymond Chandler.

He was awarded the Herodotus Award, for lifelong achievement for excellence in the writing of historical mysteries by the Historical Mystery Appreciation Society. Treason of the Ghosts was named one of The Times' Best of this year's crime novels in 2000.

== Documentaries ==
The UK Channel Five documentary, The Secret Life of Elizabeth I (2006), was based on his book of the same title. It explored Doherty's theory that Elizabeth I may have had a secret love child.

He appeared in the National Geographic Channel documentary, Secrets of the Virgin Queen. The documentary examines some controversial theories as to why Elizabeth never married (2011).

== Bibliography ==
Hugh Corbett series
Set during the 13th-century reign of Edward I of England.

1. Satan in St Mary's (1986)
2. The Crown in Darkness (1988)
3. Spy in Chancery (1988)
4. The Angel of Death (1989)
5. The Prince of Darkness (1992)
6. Murder Wears a Cowl (1992)
7. The Assassin in the Greenwood (1993)
8. The Song of a Dark Angel (1994)
9. Satan's Fire (1995)
10. The Devil's Hunt (1996)
11. The Demon Archer (1999)
12. The Treason of the Ghosts (2000)
13. Corpse Candle (2001)
14. The Magician's Death (2004)
15. The Waxman Murders (2006)
16. Nightshade (2008)
17. The Mysterium (2010)
18. Dark Serpent (2016)
19. Devil's Wolf (2017)
20. Death's Dark Valley (2019)
21. Hymn to Murder (2020)
22. Mother Midnight (2021)
23. Realm of Darkness (2022)
24. Banners of Hell (2024)
25. Immortal Murder (2025)

Sorrowful Mysteries of Brother Athelstan
Set during the 14th-century reign of Richard II of England.

1. The Nightingale Gallery (1991) (writing as Paul Harding)
2. The House of the Red Slayer aka The Red Slayer (1992) (writing as Paul Harding)
3. Murder Most Holy (1992) (writing as Paul Harding)
4. The Anger of God (1993) (writing as Paul Harding)
5. By Murder's Bright Light (1994) (writing as Paul Harding)
6. The House of Crows (1995) (writing as Paul Harding)
7. The Assassin's Riddle (1996) (writing as Paul Harding)
8. The Devil's Domain (1998)
9. The Field of Blood (1999)
10. The House of Shadows (2003)
11. Bloodstone (2011)
12. The Straw Men (2012)
13. Candle Flame (2014)
14. The Book of Fires (2014)
15. The Herald of Hell (2015)
16. The Great Revolt (2016)
17. A Pilgrimage to Murder (2017)
18. Mansions of Murder (2017)
19. The Godless (2019)
20. The Stone of Destiny (2020)
21. The Hanging Tree (2022)
22. Murder Most Treasonable (2023)
23. Murder's Snare (2024)
24. The Meadows of Murder (2026)

Matthew Jankyn series

1. The Whyte Harte (1988)
2. The Serpent Amongst the Lilies (1990)

Sir Roger Shallot Tudor Mysteries (writing as Michael Clynes)
Set during the 16th-century reign of Henry VIII of England.

1. The White Rose Murders (1991)
2. The Poisoned Chalice (1992)
3. The Grail Murders (1993)
4. A Brood of Vipers (1994)
5. The Gallows Murders (1995)
6. The Relic Murders (1996)

Kathryn Swinbrooke series (writing as C. L. Grace)
Set in 15th century England.

1. A Shrine of Murders (1993)
2. The Eye of God (1994)
3. The Merchant of Death (1995)
4. The Book of Shadows (1996)
5. Saintly Murders (2001)
6. A Maze of Murders (2002)
7. A Feast of Poisons (2004)

Nicholas Segalla series (writing as Ann Dukthas)

1. A Time for the Death of a King (1994), set in Edinburgh 1567, involving Mary, Queen of Scots
2. A Prince Lost to Time (1995), set in France circa 1793, involving Marie Antoinette
3. The Time of Murder at Mayerling (1996), set in Vienna 1889, involving Rudolf, Crown Prince of Austria
4. In the Time of the Poisoned Queen (1998), set in England 1558, involving Mary I of England

Canterbury Tales

1. An Ancient Evil (1994)
2. A Tapestry of Murders (1994)
3. A Tournament of Murders (1996)
4. Ghostly Murders (1997)
5. The Hangman's Hymn (2001)
6. A Haunt of Murder (2002)
7. The Midnight Man (2012)

Mystery of Alexander the Great (writing as Anna Apostolou)
Set in 4th-century B.C. ancient Greece.

1. A Murder in Macedon (1997)
2. A Murder in Thebes (1998)

The Egyptian Mysteries
Centered around the character of Amerokte, the chief judge of the temple of Ma'at, who becomes the investigator of conspiracies against the 15th-century BC Queen Hatusu.

1. The Mask of Ra (1998)
2. The Horus Killings (1999)
3. The Anubis Slayings (2000)
4. The Slayers of Seth (2001)
5. The Assassins of Isis (2004)
6. The Poisoner of Ptah (2007)
7. The Spies of Sobeck (2008)

Mahu (The Akhenaten-trilogy)
The ancient Egyptian noble Mahu recounts the events of the age of Akhenaten and his part in them and his relationships with other personages of the Amarna period.

1. An Evil Spirit Out of the West (2003)
2. The Season of the Hyaena (2005)
3. The Year of the Cobra (2005)

Mathilde of Westminster series
Set during the reign of Edward II of England, featuring a lady in the service of his wife Queen Isabella

1. The Cup of Ghosts (2005)
2. The Poison Maiden (2007)
3. The Darkening Glass (2009)

Political Intrigue in Ancient Rome

- Domina (2002), a fictionalized account of Agrippina, mother of Nero, A.D. 15–59.

Murder mysteries with investigator Claudia, a spy for both Helena, mother of Constantine the Great, and Sylvester, presbyter of Rome (later Pope Sylvester I), in A.D. 313 when Christianity is beginning to be established openly in Rome.

- Murder Imperial (2003)
- The Song of the Gladiator (2004)
- The Queen of the Night (2006)
- Murder's Immortal Mask (2008)

Alexander the Great Mysteries

- The House of Death (2001)
- The Godless Man (2002)
- The Gates of Hell (2003)

Templar

- The Templar (2007)
- The Templar Magician (2009)

Margaret Beaufort Series

- Dark Queen Rising (2018)
- Dark Queen Waiting (2019)
- Dark Queen Watching (2021)
- Dark Queen Wary (2023)

Other novels

- The Death of a King: A Medieval Mystery (1985)
- Prince Drakulya (1986)
- The Fate of Princes (1990)
- Dove Amongst the Hawks (1990)
- The Masked Man (1991)
- The Rose Demon (1997)
- The Haunting (1997)
- The Soul Slayer (1997)
- The Love Knot (1999) (writing as Vanessa Alexander)
- Of Love and War (2000) (writing as Vanessa Alexander)
- The Loving Cup (2001) (writing as Vanessa Alexander)
- The Plague Lord (2002)
- The Last of Days (2013)
- Roseblood (2014)

Non-fiction

- The Mysterious Death of Tutankhamun (2003); ISBN 978-1-84119-595-7
- Isabella and the Strange Death of Edward II (2003); ISBN 978-1-84119-843-9
- Alexander the Great, the Death of a God: what – or who – really killed the young conqueror of the known world? (2004); ISBN 978-1-84529-156-3
- The Great Crown Jewel Robbery of 1303 (2005); ISBN 978-1845291877
- The Secret Life of Elizabeth I (2006); ISBN 978-1-871551-85-3
- The Death of the Red King (2006); ISBN 978-1871551921

== See also ==
- Cultural depictions of Henry VIII
