= The Resurrectionist =

The Resurrectionist may refer to:

== Literature ==
- The Resurrectionist, a 1979 novel by Gary K. Wolf
- The Resurrectionist, a 1995 novel by Thomas F. Monteleone
- The Resurrectionist, a 2007 novel by James Bradley
- The Resurrectionist, a 2008 novel by Jack O'Connell
- The Resurrectionist, a 2009 novel by Wrath James White, basis for the 2014 film Come Back to Me
- The Resurrectionists, a 2000 horror novel by Kim Wilkins
- The Resurrectionists, a 2003 novel by Michael Collins

== Television ==
- "The Resurrectionists", Adam Adamant Lives! series 2, episode 11 (1967)
- "The Resurrectionists", Father Brown (2013) series 4, episode 8 (2016)

== See also ==
- Body Snatcher (disambiguation)
- Resurrection man
- Resurrectionist
- Revivalist
