= General Slocum disaster =

1904 maritime disaster in New York City

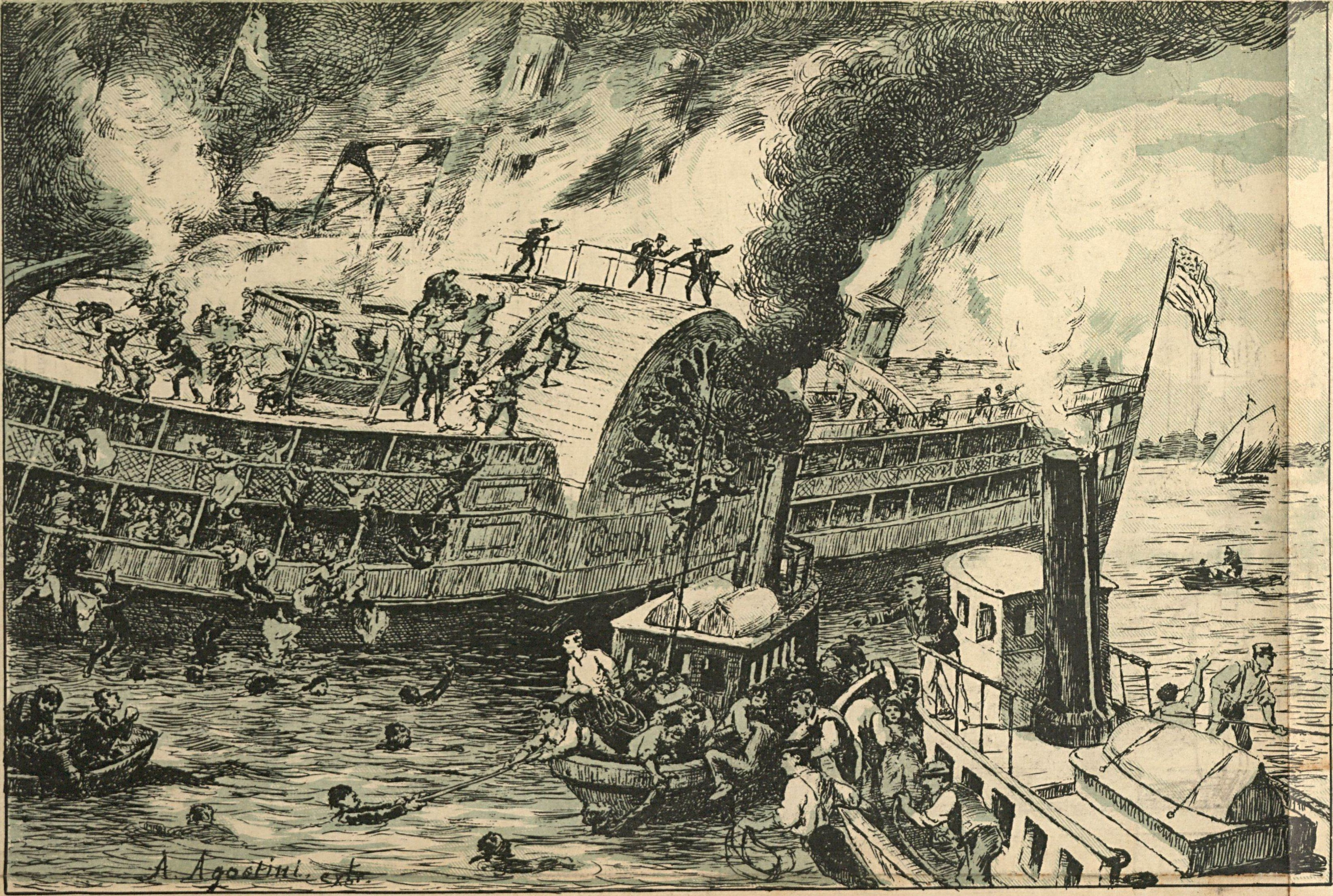
- Contemporary illustration of the General Slocum disaster (Angelo Agostini, O Malho, 1904)
- Date: June 15, 1904; 122 years ago
- Time: 09:30–10:10 EST
- Duration: 40 minutes
- Location: East River, New York City, U.S.
- Type: Maritime disaster
- Cause: Ship fire
- Participants: General Slocum crew and passengers
- Deaths: estimated 1,021

On June 15, 1904, PS General Slocum, a paddle steamer of the Knickerbocker Steam Company, caught fire and sank in the East River of New York City. At the time of the disaster, she was on a chartered run carrying members of St. Mark's Evangelical Lutheran Church (German Americans from Little Germany, Manhattan) to a church picnic. An estimated 1,021 out of the 1,342 people on board died.

The General Slocum disaster was the worst maritime disaster of the 20th century until the sinking of the RMS Titanic surpassed it eight years later in 1912. It remains the worst maritime disaster in New York City history, and the second-worst on U.S. waterways, after the explosion and sinking of the steamboat Sultana, and until the September 11 attacks in 2001 was the deadliest manmade disaster of any sort in the New York area.

== Background ==
The General Slocum was a passenger ship of the Knickerbocker Steamship Company, taking people on excursions around New York City. Prior to June 1904, she already had a series of mishaps over her 13-year career.

== Day of disaster ==
On Wednesday, June 15, 1904, the ship had been chartered for $350 by St. Mark's Evangelical Lutheran Church in the Little Germany district of Manhattan. This was an annual rite for the group, which had made the trip for 17 consecutive years. Nearly 1,400 passengers, mostly women and children, boarded General Slocum, which was to sail up the East River and then eastward across the Long Island Sound to Locust Grove, a picnic site in Eatons Neck, Long Island. The official post-disaster report stated there were 1,358 passengers and 30 officers and crew; fewer than 150 of the passengers were estimated to be adult males over 21. Of those on board, there were 957 deaths and 180 injuries. Less than twenty minutes elapsed between the start of the fire and the collapse of the hurricane deck.

=== The fire ===
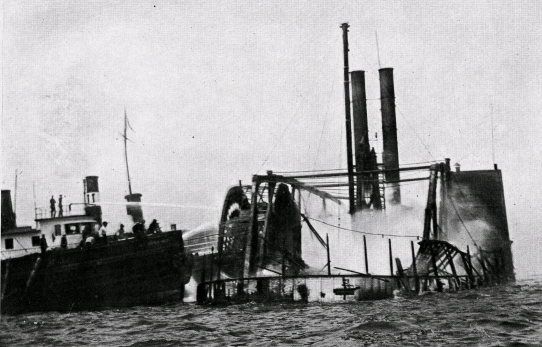
Firefighters working to extinguish the General Slocum

Under the command of Captain William Van Schaick, the ship got under way from the recreation pier at Third Street on the East River at 9:30 am; it passed west of Blackwell Island (now Roosevelt Island) and turned east, remaining south of Wards Island. As it was passing East 90th Street, a fire started in the forward cabin or Lamp Room, the third compartment aft from the bow under the main deck; the fire was possibly caused by a discarded cigarette or match. The disastrous fire was fueled by the straw, oily rags, and lamp oil strewn around the room. The first notice of a fire was at 10 a.m.; eyewitnesses claimed the initial blaze began in various locations, including a paint locker filled with flammable liquids and a cabin filled with gasoline. Passengers on the main deck were aware of the fire at the entrance to Hell Gate. Captain Van Schaick was not notified until 10 minutes after the fire was discovered. A 12-year-old boy had tried to warn him earlier, but was not believed. After he was notified of the fire, Van Schaick ordered full speed ahead; approximately 30 seconds later, he directed the pilot to beach the ship on North Brother Island. Following this last command, Van Schaick descended to the hurricane deck and remained there until he was able to jump into shallow water after the ship was beached.

Although the captain was ultimately responsible for the safety of passengers, the owners had made no effort to maintain or replace the ship's safety equipment. The main deck was equipped with a standpipe connected to a steam pump, but the fire hose attached to the forward end of the standpipe, a 100 ft (30 m) length of "cheap unlined linen," had been allowed to rot and burst in several places. When the crew tried to put out the fire; they were unable to attach a rubber hose because the coupling of the linen hose remained attached to the standpipe. The ship was also equipped with hand pumps and buckets, but they were not used during the disaster; the crew gave up firefighting efforts after failing to attach the rubber hose. The crew had not practiced a fire drill that year, and the lifeboats were tied up and inaccessible. Some claimed the lifeboats were wired and painted in place.

Survivors reported that the life preservers were useless and fell apart in their hands, while desperate mothers placed life jackets on their children and tossed them into the water, only to watch in horror as their children sank instead of floating. Most of those on board were women and children who, like most Americans of the time, could not swim; victims found that their heavy wool clothing absorbed water and weighed them down in the river.

It was discovered that Nonpareil Cork Works, supplier of cork materials to manufacturers of life preservers, placed 8 oz (230 g) iron bars inside the cork materials to meet minimum content requirements (6 lb (2.7 kg) of "good cork") at the time. Nonpareil's deception was revealed by David Kahnweiler's Sons, who inspected a shipment of 300 cork blocks. Many of the life preservers had been filled with cheap and less effective granulated cork and brought up to proper weight by the inclusion of the iron weights. Canvas covers, rotted with age, split and scattered the powdered cork. Managers of the company (Nonpareil Cork Works) were indicted but not convicted. The life preservers on the Slocum had been manufactured in 1891 and had hung above the deck, unprotected from the elements, for 13 years.

=== Beaching on North Brother Island ===
Captain Van Schaick decided to continue his course rather than run the ship aground or stop at a nearby landing. By going into headwinds and failing to immediately ground the ship, he fanned the fire and promoted its spread from fore to aft; the investigating commission later faulted Van Schaick for passing up opportunities to beach the vessel in Little Hell Gate (west of the Sunken Meadows) or the Bronx Bills (east of the Sunken Meadows), which also would have put the prevailing winds astern, keeping flames from spreading along the length of the ship. Van Schaick later argued he was trying to avoid having the fire spread to riverside buildings and oil tanks. Flammable paint also helped the fire spread out of control, driven aft mainly along the port side of the ship; passengers, who were on the upper promenade and hurricane decks, were forced into the aft starboard quarter.

General Slocum, June 15, 1904
1 0930: departs 3rd St Recreation Pier
2 approx. 1000: fire breaks out near Hell Gate
3 approx. 1010: ship grounded on North Brother Island
4 Intended destination: Locust Grove, Eatons Neck

Ten minutes after the ship was beached, the fire had essentially engulfed the vessel; no more than twenty minutes had elapsed since the first flames came up from the Lamp Room. Some passengers jumped into the river to escape the fire, but the heavy women's clothing of the day made swimming almost impossible and dragged them under water to drown. An estimated 100 to 500 died when the overloaded starboard section of the hurricane deck collapsed, casting those passengers into deep water, and others were battered by the still-turning paddles as they tried to escape into the water or over the sides. The commission estimated that 400 to 600 people drowned after the ship was beached, as they jumped off the aft portion of the boat into deep water; those jumping off the bow landed in shallower water.

General Slocum remained beached on North Brother Island for approximately 90 minutes before breaking free and drifting east for approximately 1 mi (1.6 km); by the time she sank in shallow water off the Bronx shore at Hunts Point, an estimated 1,021 people, including 2 of the 30 crew members, had either burned to death or drowned. There were 431 survivors. The actions of two tugboats which arrived a few minutes after the Slocum was beached were credited with saving between 200 and 350 people.

The 1904 Steamboat Inspection Service Report estimated the following figures for casualties of a total of 1,388 persons involved in the disaster:

Status	Passengers	Crew
Total on board	1,358	30
Adults	613	–
Children	745	–
Dead	955	2
Identified dead	893	2
Missing & unidentified dead	62	0
Injured	175	5
Uninjured	228	23

The captain lost sight in one eye owing to the fire. Reports indicate that Captain Van Schaick deserted General Slocum as soon as it settled, jumping into a nearby tug, along with several crew. He was hospitalized at Lebanon Hospital.

Many acts of heroism were performed by the passengers, witnesses, and emergency personnel. Staff and patients from the hospital on North Brother Island participated in the rescue efforts, forming human chains and pulling victims from the water, and also used ladders that belonged to construction crews working on repairing the hospital building.

A young nurse named Mary McCann waded into the East River after witnessing the fire. McCann, reportedly a strong swimmer, waded into the East River and helped passengers to safety, including as many as nine children. She herself became injured and was rescued unconscious, and subsequently spent several days in hospital herself. In 1908, McCann was awarded the silver Lifesaving Medal by the United States Congress, for her courageous action on the night of the disaster. She received the medal in person a few months later, when it was presented to her by the Speaker of the House, Joseph Gurney Cannon.

== Aftermath ==
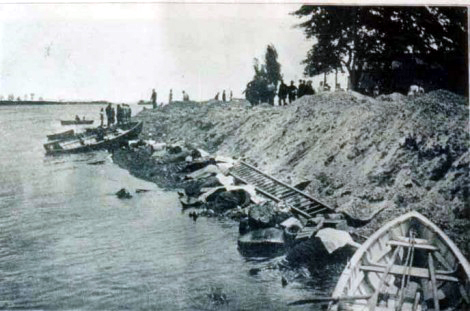
Victims of General Slocum washed ashore at North Brother Island

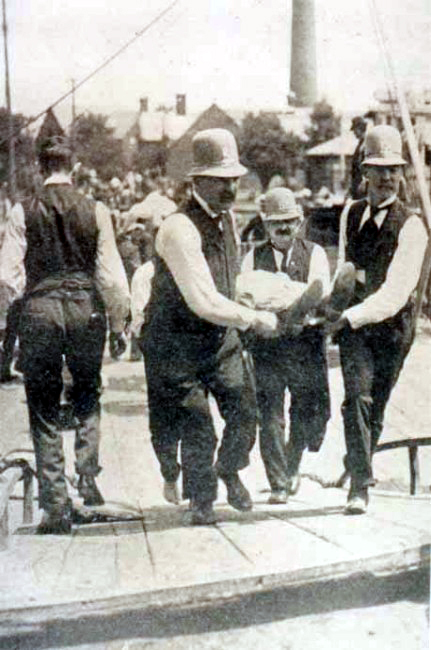
Carrying away a body from North Brother Island

The evidence before the Commission establishes the fact that the master made no attempt whatsoever to fight the fire, to examine its condition, or to control, assure, direct, or aid the passengers in any way whatever. ... An essential fact of negligence is the utter failure of the master to fight the fire or aid the passengers. In a less degree the pilots, in the same manner, after beaching the boat, and while there were still many passengers on board, failed in their duty to assist and rescue the said passengers. Very little assistance was given or control exercised by any of the officers or crew on behalf of the passengers.

— Slocum Report (1904)

Eight people were indicted by a federal grand jury after the disaster: the captain, two inspectors, and the president, secretary, treasurer, and commodore of the Knickerbocker Steamship Company.

Most boatmen felt that Van Schaick "was unjustly made a scapegoat for the resulting tragedy, instead of the owners of the steamer or the effectiveness of the life saving and fire fighting equipment then required — and the inspections of it by government inspectors". He was the only person convicted. He was found guilty on one of three charges: criminal negligence, for failing to maintain proper fire drills and fire extinguishers. The jury could not reach a verdict on the other two counts of manslaughter. He was sentenced to 10 years imprisonment. He spent three years and six months at Sing Sing prison before he was paroled. President Theodore Roosevelt declined to pardon Van Schaick. Van Schaick was finally released when the federal parole board under the William Howard Taft administration voted to free him on August 26, 1911. He was pardoned by President Taft on December 19, 1912; the pardon became effective on Christmas Day. After his death in 1927, Schaick was buried in Oakwood Cemetery (Troy, New York).

The Knickerbocker Steamship Company, which owned the ship, paid a relatively small fine despite evidence that they might have falsified inspection records. The disaster motivated federal and state regulation to improve the emergency equipment on passenger ships.

The neighborhood of Little Germany, which had been in decline for some time before the disaster as residents moved uptown, almost disappeared afterward. With the trauma and arguments that followed the tragedy and the loss of many prominent settlers, most of the Lutheran Germans remaining on the Lower East Side eventually moved uptown. The church whose congregation chartered the ship for the fateful voyage was converted to a synagogue in 1940 after the area was settled by Jewish residents.

The victims were interred in cemeteries around New York, with 58 identified victims buried in the Cemetery of the Evergreens, and 46 identified victims buried in Green-Wood Cemetery, both in Brooklyn. Many victims were buried at Lutheran Cemetery in Middle Village, Queens (now Lutheran All Faiths Cemetery) where an annual memorial ceremony is held at the historical marker.

In 1906, a marble memorial fountain was erected in the north central part of Tompkins Square Park in Manhattan by the Sympathy Society of German Ladies, with the inscription: "They are Earth's purest children, young and fair."

The sunken remains of General Slocum were salvaged and converted into a 625-gross register ton barge named Maryland, which sank in the South River in 1909 and again in the Atlantic Ocean off the southeast coast of New Jersey near Strathmere and Sea Isle City during a storm on December 4, 1911, while carrying a cargo of coal. All four people aboard Maryland survived the sinking.

The victims included one Emily Ziegler, the girlfriend of a saloonkeeper named John Flammang Schrank who later suffered a mental breakdown culminating in an attempted assassination of Theodore Roosevelt.

=== Survivors ===
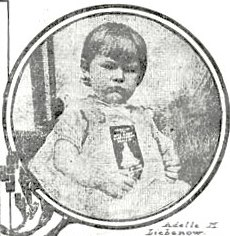
Adella Liebenow in June 1905; she was the youngest survivor of the disaster

On January 26, 2004, the last surviving passenger from General Slocum, Adella Wotherspoon (née Liebenow), died at the age of 100. At the time of the disaster, she was a six-month-old infant. Wotherspoon was the youngest survivor of the tragedy that took the lives of her two older sisters. When she was one year old, she unveiled the Steamboat Fire Mass Memorial on June 15, 1905, at Lutheran All Faiths Cemetery, in Middle Village, Queens. Before Wotherspoon's death, the previous oldest survivor was Catherine Connelly (née Uhlmyer) (1893–2002) who was 11 years old at the time of the disaster.

== Legacy ==
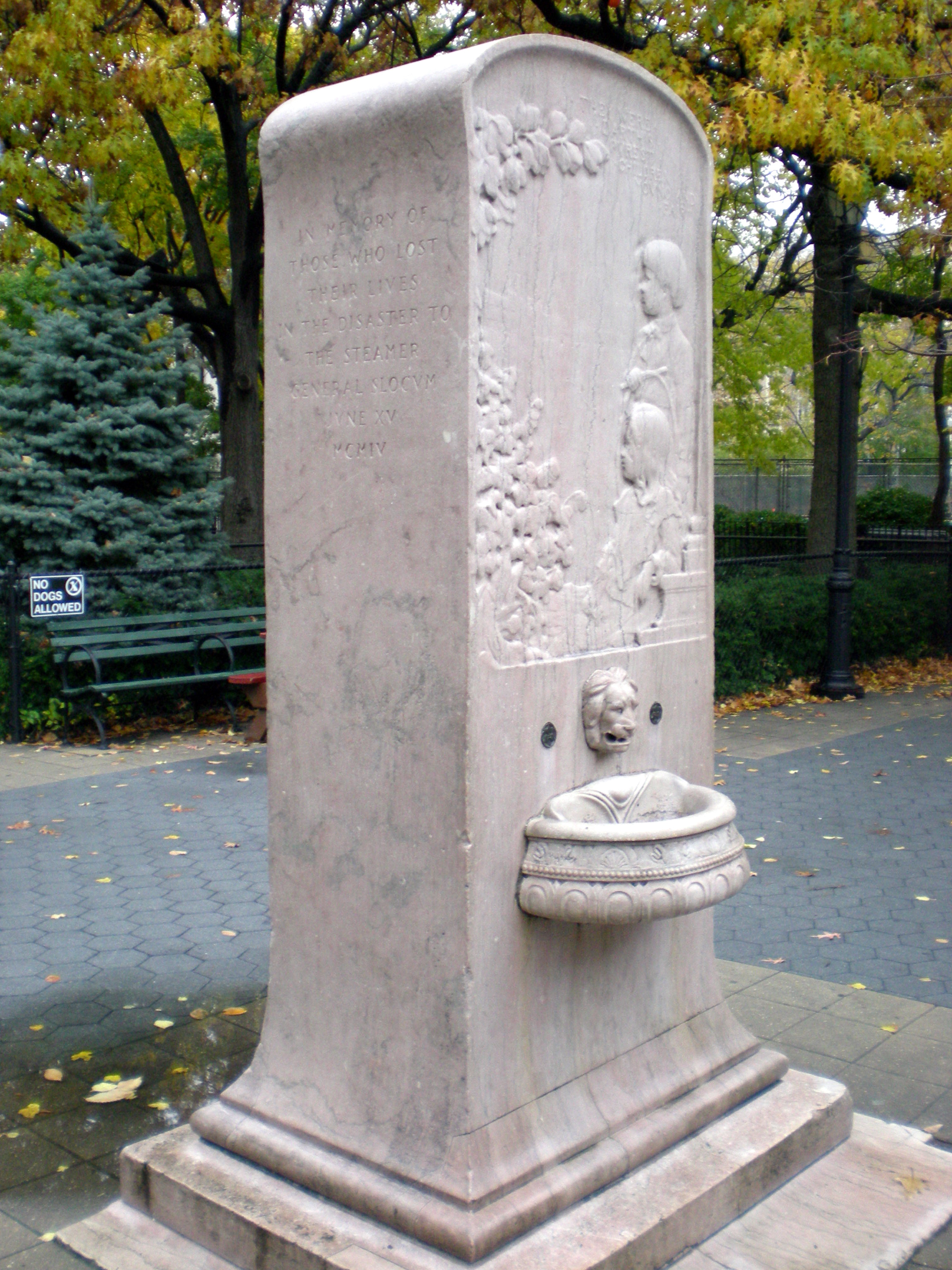
The General Slocum disaster memorial in Tompkins Square Park, Manhattan, New York City, which was once part of the Little Germany neighborhood

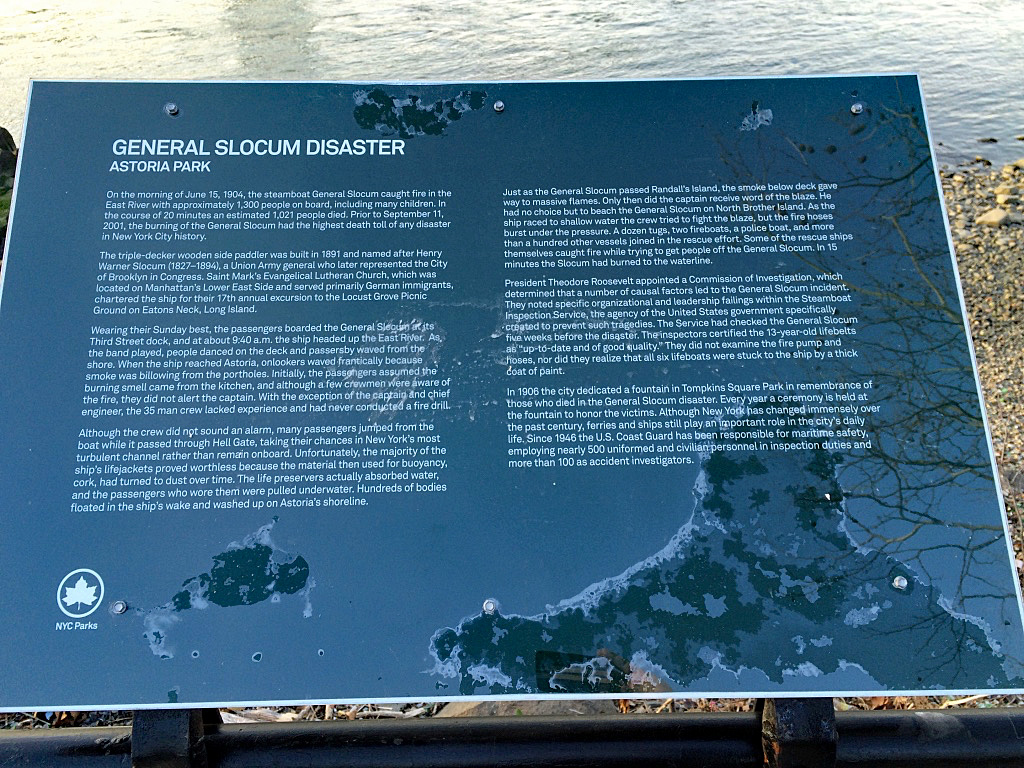
Historical marker in Astoria Park, Queens, overlooking the Hell Gate section of the East River, past where the burning ship began to sink

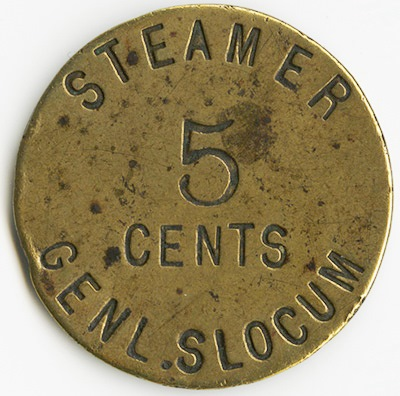
General Slocum token in the collection at the Mariners' Museum in Newport News, Virginia

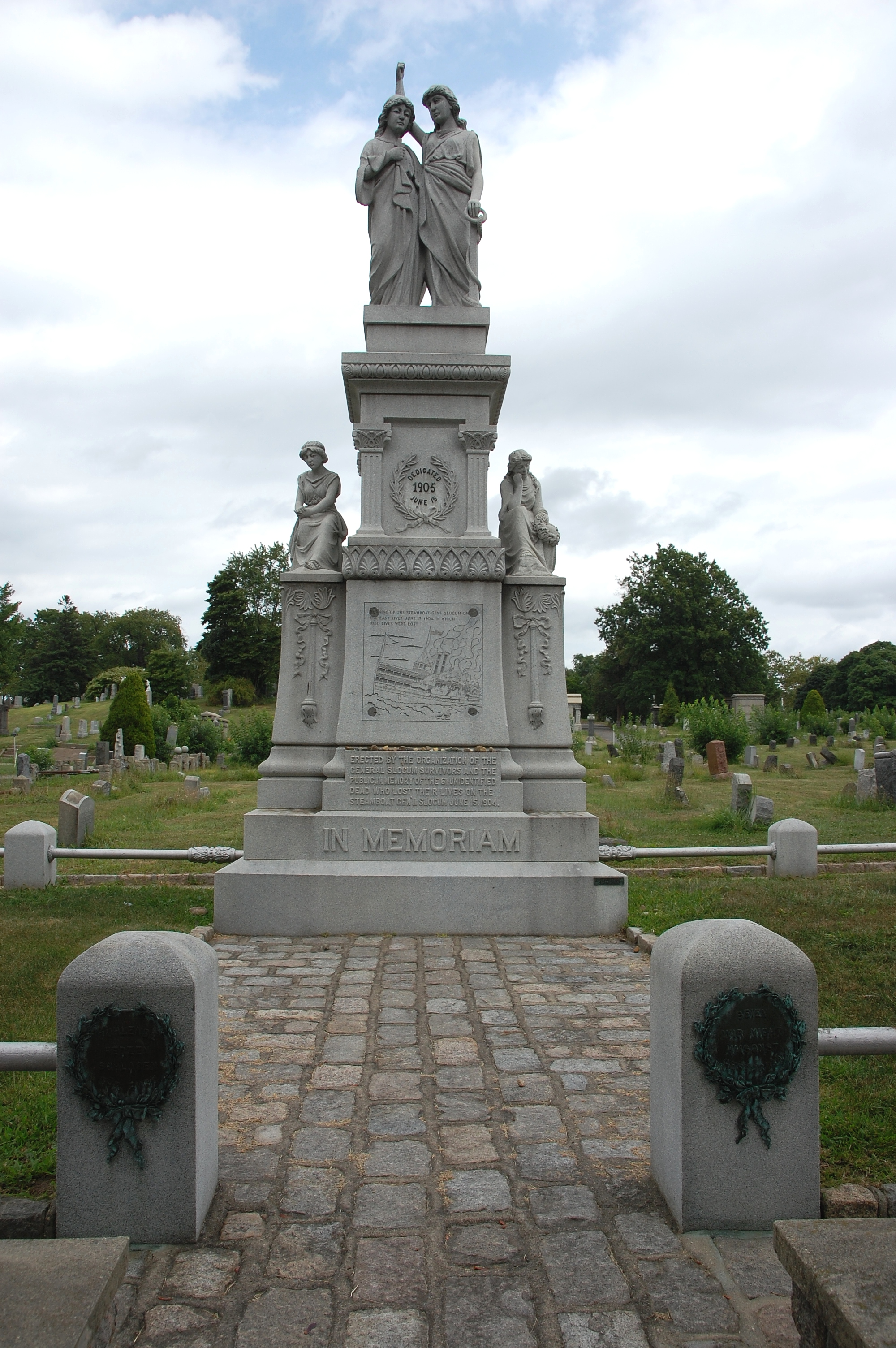
The General Slocum Memorial in the Lutheran All Faiths Cemetery in Middle Village, Queens, is home to the graves of many victims of the disaster.

=== In popular culture ===
Literature

- 1922 – A few references are made to the disaster in James Joyce's Ulysses, the events of which take place on the following day (June 16, 1904).
- 1925 – A few references to the disaster occur in John Dos Passos' novel Manhattan Transfer.
- 1939 – Journalist Nat Ferber's autobiography, I Found Out: A Confidential Chronicle of the Twenties, begins with his reporting on the General Slocum tragedy.
- 1975 – Robert Shea and Robert Anton Wilson's satirical The Illuminatus! Trilogy briefly mentions the disaster as attributable to the 23 enigma, since 19+04=23. Cartwright alleges that the disaster was an Illuminati technique for "transcendental illumination" through human sacrifice.
- 1996 – Eric Blau's novel The Hero of the Slocum Disaster is based on the disaster; it was later adapted by Patrick Tull and Emily King into a one-person play.
- 2000 – The story of General Slocum was described as an "Avoidable Catastrophe" in Bob Fenster's book, Duh! The Stupid History of the Human Race, in Part One, which discusses stories involving stupidity.
- 2003 – Ship Ablaze by Edward O'Donnell is a detailed history of the event.
- 2003 – The disaster is featured in one of the chapters of author Clive Cussler's book The Sea Hunters 2 when he finds the wreckage of the barge Maryland, which was the converted Slocum after she was salvaged.
- 2003 – The protagonist of Pete Hamill's Forever: A Novel describes the event both as the worst disaster in New York's history at its time, and the point at which Germans left Kleindeutschland for Yorkville, effectively vacating the present-day Lower East Side, which was then adopted by Central European Jews.
- 2004 – The 2005 Hugo Award-nominated novella Time Ablaze by Michael A. Burstein (Analog, June 2004) concerns a time traveler who comes to record the disaster. The story was published to commemorate the 100th anniversary of the disaster.
- 2005 – The General Slocum disaster is mentioned as one of the New York disasters that ghosts reappeared from in the short story "There's a Hole in the City" by Richard Bowes.
- 2006 – The General Slocum disaster is at the center of the novel Kiss Me, I'm Dead, by J.G. Sandom, also published as The Unresolved using the pen name of T.K. Welsh.
- 2008 – The General Slocum disaster plays a prominent role in Richard Crabbe's novel Hell's Gate.
- 2009 – The General Slocum tragedy is described in detail in Glenn Stout's 2009 biography of Gertrude Ederle, Young Woman and the Sea. Stout uses the incident, in which many women and young children drowned, to help explain the history of how women, including Ederle, were afforded opportunities to learn to swim during the early part of the century.
- 2010–2012 – The disaster plays a prominent role in the novels In the Shadow of Gotham (2010) and Secret of the White Rose (2012) by Stefanie Pintoff.
- 2011 – The sinking and the spirits of the dead near the site of the sinking at the Hell Gate Bridge are a major plot line in the supernatural novel Dead Waters by Anton Strout.
- 2013 – In the Dean Koontz novel Innocence, deaths caused by the sinking of General Slocum prompted the construction of secret rooms dedicated to the memory of a family lost.

Film, television, music

- 1904 – The Slocum Disaster - This silent American Mutoscope and Biograph Company (#2932) documentary short filmed by G. W. Bitzer features footage of the collecting of bodies on North Brother Island, the temporary morgue at the offices of Public Charites, and mourners at St. Marks German Evangelical Lutheran Church, taken on June 16 and 17, 1904 and released that same month on the 22nd.
- 1904 – The American composer Charles Ives (1874–1954) wrote the tone poem "The General Slocum", a musical portrait of the disaster.
- 1915 – Regeneration is an early gangster film directed by Raoul Walsh and produced by William Fox. The film was lost until the 1970s. It has a lengthy scene in which an excursion picnic ship burns in dramatic fashion while passengers jump overboard, an obvious reference to the General Slocum disaster. Walsh shot the scene in New York, not far from where the real disaster occurred.
- 1934 – The first scenes of the film Manhattan Melodrama recreated the disaster.
- 1998 – German television produced and aired Die Slocum brennt! (The Slocum is on Fire!), an hour-long documentary by Christian Baudissin about the disaster and its impact on the German community of New York.
- 2001 – A description of the disaster and the following events, in comparison with the September 11 attacks, is given by David Rakoff in an episode of the radio program This American Life.
- 2002 – The General Slocum disaster was featured in the documentary My Father's Gun.
- 2004 – Ship Ablaze was a documentary made by History Channel, with production help from NFL Films, featuring a filmed reenactment of the disaster along with interviews of the two remaining General Slocum survivors. The documentary takes its name from the book by Edward O'Donnell, who is interviewed in it.
- 2004 – Fearful Visitation, New York's Great Steamboat Fire of 1904, produced by Philip Dray and Hank Linhart, running time 53 minutes, premiered at the New-York Historical Society for the 100-year commemoration in 2004, and was broadcast on PBS. It features interviews with the last two living survivors and historians Ed O'Donnell, Kenneth T. Jackson, and Lucy Sante.
- 2012 – The disaster was featured in Season 4, Episode 3 of the program Mysteries at the Museum.
- 2017 – The American Housewife TV series episode on May 2 featured child cast member Julia Butters (seasons 1–4) as Anna-Kat Otto. Her character had a morbid fear of water which was derived from reading about the sinking of General Slocum. She cited several facts about the event.
- 2017 – History Retold: Fire at Sea is a documentary that describes the disaster among other disasters involving ships catching fire at sea.
- 2022 – The folk music group The Longest Johns reference the sinking in their song "Downed and Drowned."

== See also ==
- List of maritime disasters in the 20th century
- List of disasters in New York City by death toll
