= Little Germany, Manhattan =

Former neighborhood of New York City

Coordinates: 40°43′34″N 73°58′53″W

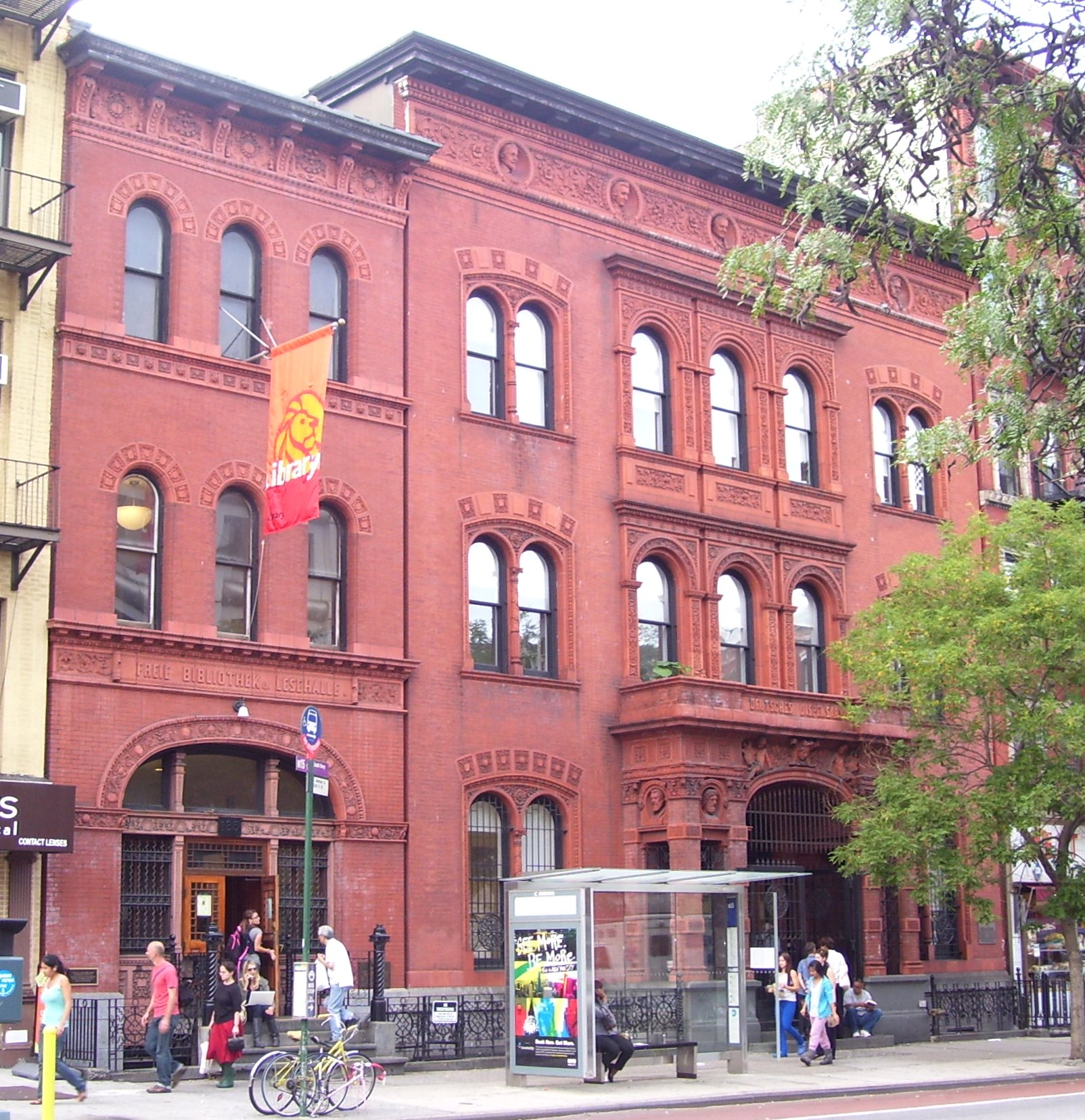
The former Freie Bibliothek und Lesehalle ("Free Library and Reading Hall", left; now the Ottendorfer Branch of the New York Public Library) and Deutsches Dispensary ("German Dispensary", right; now Stuyvesant Polyclinic Hospital) on Second Avenue in the East Village. Both NYC Landmarks were designed by William Schickel and built during 1883–1884.

Little Germany, known in German as Kleindeutschland and Deutschländle and called Dutchtown by contemporary non-Germans, was a German immigrant neighborhood on the Lower East Side and East Village neighborhoods of Manhattan in New York City. The demography of the neighborhood began to change in the late 19th century, as non-German immigrants settled in the area. A steady decline of Germans among the population was accelerated in 1904, when the General Slocum disaster decimated the social core of the population with the loss of more than 1,000 lives.

== Growth ==
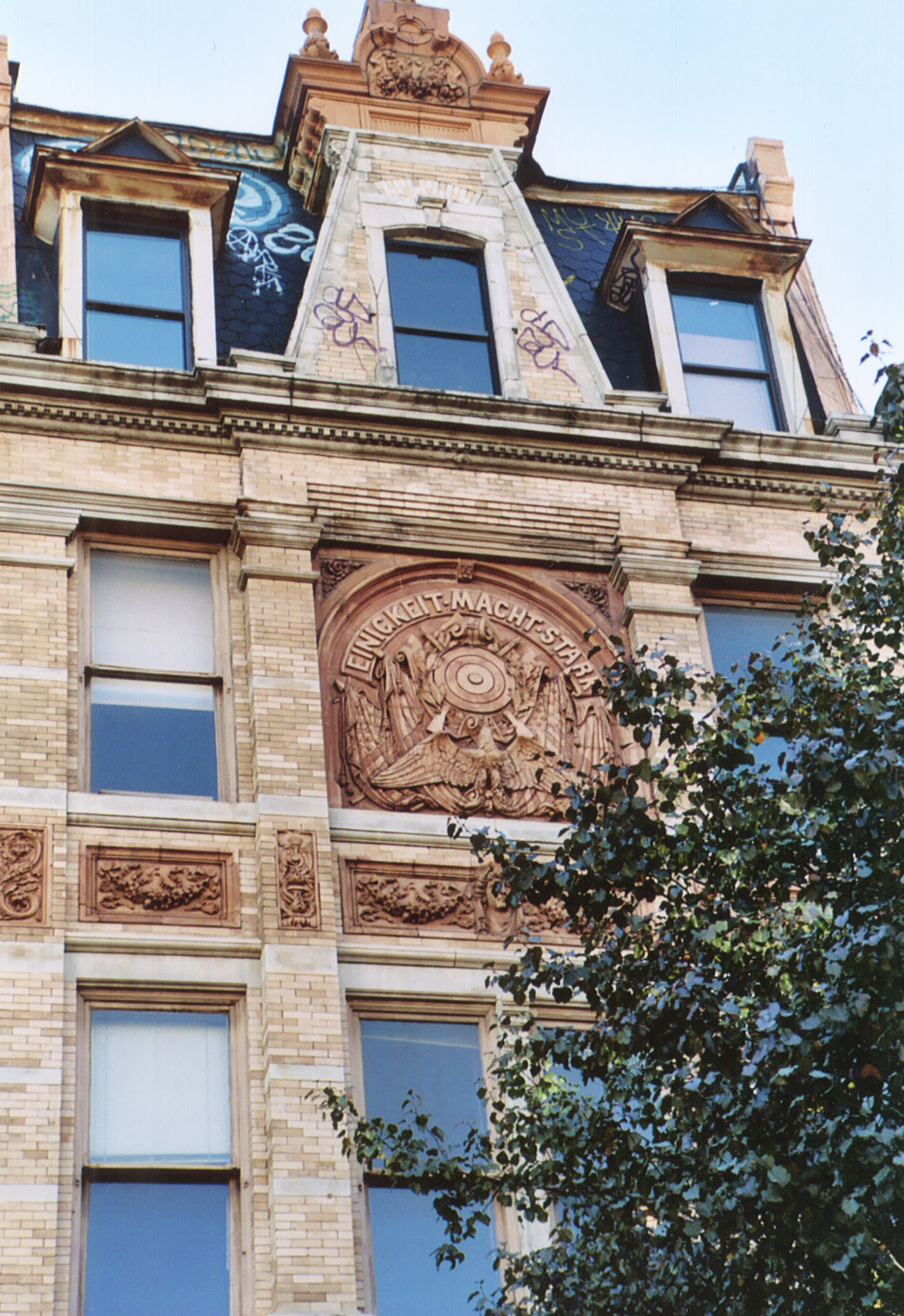
Former German-American Shooting Society Clubhouse at 12 St Mark's Place (1885) with inscription Einigkeit macht stark ("Unity strengthens") designed by William C. Frohne

Beginning in the 1840s, large numbers of German immigrants entering the United States provided a constant population influx for Little Germany. In the 1850s alone, 800,000 Germans passed through New York. By 1855 New York had the third largest German population of any city in the world, outranked only by Berlin and Vienna. The German immigrants differed from others in that they usually were educated and had marketable skills in crafts. More than half of the era's bakers and cabinet makers were Germans or of German origin, and many Germans also worked in the construction business. Educated Germans such as Joseph Wedemeyer, Oswald Ottendorfer and Friedrich Sorge were important players in the creation and growth of trade unions, and many Germans and their Vereine (German American clubs) were also often politically active. Oswald Ottendorfer who was the owner-editor of the Staats-Zeitung, New York's largest German-language newspaper, was among the wealthiest and most socially prominent German-Americans in the city. He also became the undisputed leader of the newly important German Democracy, which would help Fernando Wood recapture the mayor's office in 1861 and elect Godfrey Gunther as mayor in 1863.

At the time, Germans tended to cluster more than other immigrants, such as the Irish, and in fact those from particular German states preferred to live together. This choice of living in wards with those from the same region was perhaps the most distinct and overlooked feature of Kleindeutschland. For instance the Prussians, who by 1880 accounted for nearly one-third of the city's German-born population, were most heavily concentrated in the city's Tenth Ward. Germans from Hessen-Nassau tended to live in the Thirteenth Ward in the 1860s and in the ensuing decades moved northward to the borders of the Eleventh and Seventeenth Wards. Germans from Baden by the 1880s tended to favor living in the Thirteenth Ward, and Württembergers began by the 1860s to migrate northward into the Seventeenth Ward. The Bavarians (including Palatines from the Palatinate region of western Germany on the Rhine River, which was subject to the King of Bavaria), the largest group of German immigrants in the city by 1860, were distributed evenly in each German ward except the Prussian Tenth. Aside from the small group of Hanoverians, who had a strong sense of self-segregation forming their own "Little Hanover" in the Thirteenth Ward, the Bavarians displayed the strongest regional bias, mainly toward Prussians: at all times the most distinctive characteristic of their settlement pattern remained that they would be found wherever the Prussians were fewest.

In 1845, Little Germany was already the largest German-American neighborhood in New York; by 1855, its German population had more than quadrupled, displacing the American-born workers who had first moved into the neighborhood's new housing, and at the beginning of the 20th century, it was home to almost 50,000 people. From a core in the riverside 11th Ward, it expanded to encompass most of the 10th, 13th, and 17th Wards, the same area that later became known as the Jewish Lower East Side. Tompkins Square Park, in what is now known as Alphabet City, was an important public space that the Germans called the Weisse Garten. There were beer gardens, sport clubs, libraries, choirs, shooting clubs, German theatres, German schools, German churches, and German synagogues. A large number of factories and small workshops operated in the neighborhood, initially in the interiors of blocks, reached by alleyways. There were major commercial streets including department stores. Stanley Nadel quotes a description of the neighborhood at its peak in the 1870s:

Wards on Manhattan in 1870 marked in red. Little Germany was located in the 10th, 11th, 13th, and 17th Wards in the bottom of the map.

At the beginning of the '70s, after a decade of continuously rising immigration, Kleindeutschland was in its fullest bloom. Kleindeutschland, called Dutchtown by the Irish, consisted of 400 blocks formed by some six avenues and nearly forty streets. Tompkins Square formed pretty much the center. Avenue B, occasionally called the German Broadway, was the commercial artery. Each basement was a workshop, every first floor was a store, and the partially roofed sidewalks were markets for goods of all sorts. Avenue A was the street for beer halls, oyster saloons and groceries. The Bowery was the western border (anything further west was totally foreign), but it was also the amusement and loafing district. There all the artistic treats, from classical drama to puppet comedies, were available.

== General Slocum disaster ==
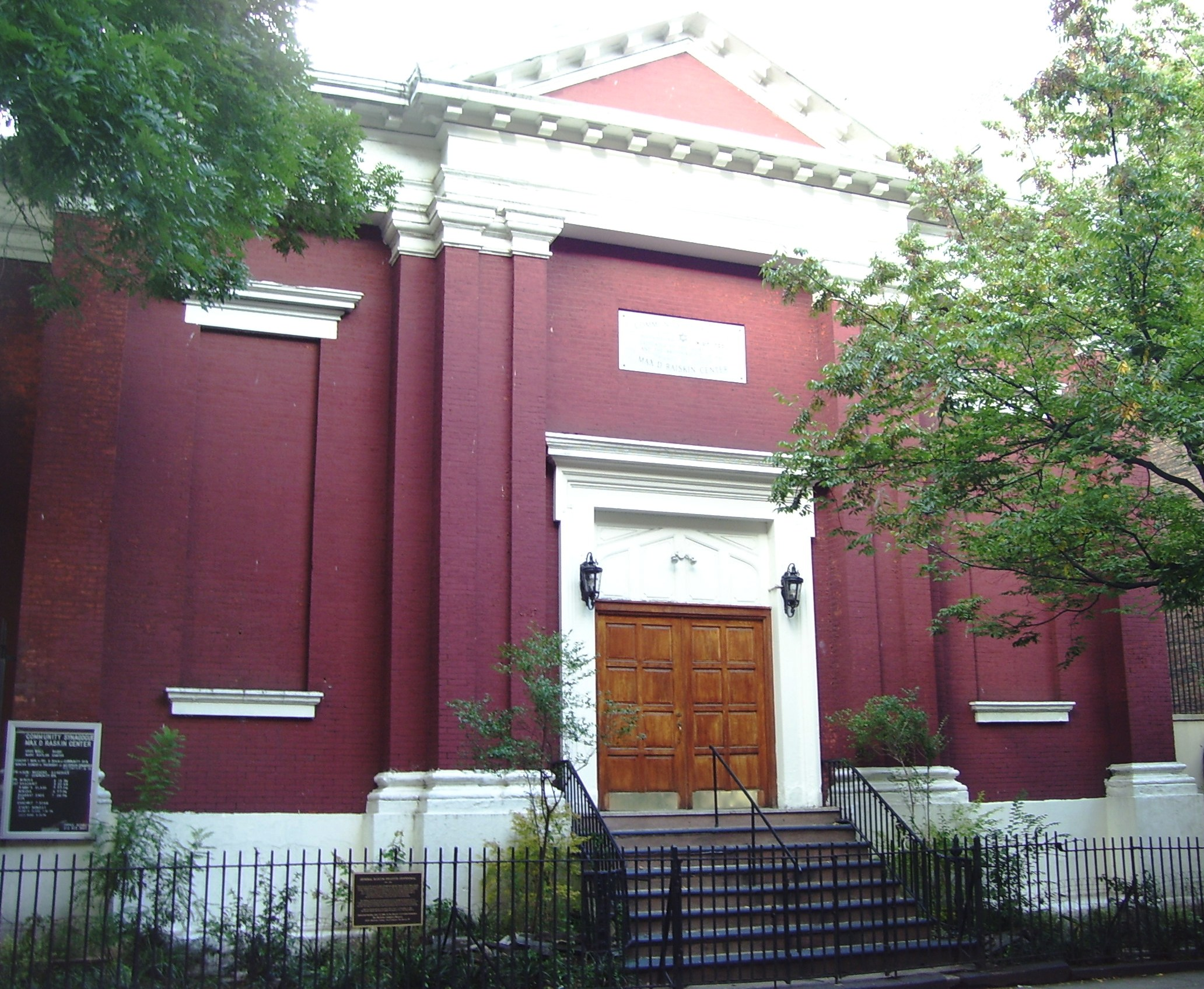
The former St. Mark's Evangelical Lutheran Church has been a synagogue since 1940.

On June 15, 1904, St Mark's Evangelical Lutheran Church organized their 17th annual picnic to commemorate the end of the school year. A large paddlewheeler, the General Slocum, was chartered for a cruise on the East River to a picnic site on Long Island, and over 1,300 passengers, mostly women and children, participated in the event. Shortly after departing, a fire started in a storage compartment in the forward section. Although the ship was equipped with lifeboats and preservers, both were in disrepair. The inadequacy of the safety equipment, compounded with the poor leadership of Captain William Van Schaick, caused an estimated 1,021 passengers to die by fire or drowning.

Although only one percent of Little Germany's population was killed by the disaster, those lost were members of the most established families, the social foundation of Little Germany's community, and the extent of the disaster had enormous repercussions on the St Mark's parish. The disaster as well as the accelerated exodus that was already well underway and the future anti-German sentiment that would occur during World War I would lead Kleindeutschland to extinction. Some bereaved parents, spouses, children, and friends committed suicide. To further complicate matters, the desire to find a culprit, conflicting public opinion, and family quarrels among survivors about the distribution of money from a relief fund led the culture of Little Germany to turn sour. The final indignity was the jury's refusal to find Captain Van Schaick guilty of manslaughter; one of the only things he was ever punished for was lack of safety-preparedness, which was sufficient for him to receive a ten-year prison sentence.

== Decline ==
The General Slocum disaster was perhaps the final blow in hastening the end of Little Germany, but for decades before that event, the neighborhood had been contracting in size, both in population and in area. Near the end of the 19th century, between 1870 and 1900, second-generation German-Americans began to leave the old neighborhood to resettle in Brooklyn, in particular in Williamsburg, and farther uptown on the East Side of Manhattan, in Yorkville. At the same time, the press of new mass immigration into the city of not only Germans – whose numbers peaked in the 1880s – and Irish, but also large numbers of Russian and Yiddish speaking Eastern European Jews and Italians from the south of that country caused Little Germany to contract, so that rather than taking up a large portion of the East Side below 23rd Street, it was eventually bounded by 14th Street on the north, Grand Street on the south, Broadway on the west, and the East River on the east. As well, the new mix of immigrants coming in changed the character of the area, so that what had been Kleindeutschland began to transform into the Lower East Side. The Slocum disaster accelerated the process, as in its wake, much of the remaining German population moved, to Yorkville and elsewhere.

== See also ==
- Ridgewood, a neighborhood in Queens with a sizable German presence
- Yorkville, another historically German neighborhood in Manhattan
- List of named ethnic enclaves in North American cities
- Washington Heights, Manhattan, home of the historical German-Jewish neighborhood of "Frankfurt-on-the-Hudson"
- Lower East Side, the neighborhood in which Little Germany was located
