= Helen Repa =

Chicago ship disaster hero

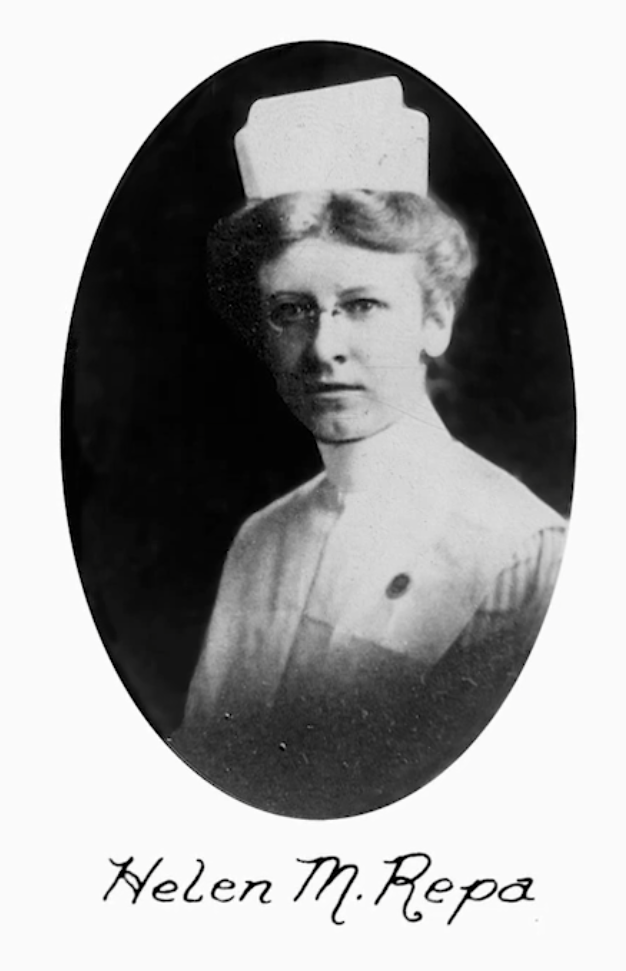
- Helen Repa's 1912 nursing school graduation photo
- Born: Helena Marie Repa; 17 August 1884; Chicago, Illinois, United States
- Died: 21 November 1938 (aged 54); Chicago, Illinois, United States
- Burial place: Resurrection Catholic Cemetery and Mausoleums, Justice, Illinois
- Education: St. Mary of Nazareth School of Nursing
- Occupation: Nurse
- Years active: 1909–1938
- Employer(s): Western Electric, general practitioner, Oak Forest Infirmary
- Known for: Rescuing numerous passengers from the SS Eastland
- Spouse: Frank Joseph Tomek (1897 – 1954)
- Children: 1

Helena Marie "Helen" Repa (17 August 1884 – 21 November 1938) was a Czech American woman who rescued numerous passengers from the 1915 SS Eastland ship disaster in Chicago. Employed as a company nurse for Western Electric, Repa worked for eight hours straight on what was ultimately the deadliest day in Chicago history.

== Early life ==
Helen Repa was born on 17 August 1884 in Chicago, daughter of Vojtech Repa and Katerina Strnad of western Bohemia. She was the oldest of three siblings, Mary, Frances, and Francis. Three other siblings were born but none lived to adulthood. Repa's parents had to anglicize their names to Albert and Katherine to fit in, despite being raised in a Bohemian neighborhood. Vojtech died in 1898, throwing the family into chaos. Katerina worked as a landlady to make ends meet; her children also had to work to keep the family going. Repa worked as a dressmaker by 1900 if not earlier. Her only education growing up was from an elementary school run by the St. John Nepomucene Church; she did not progress further.

Despite lacking a full education, Repa managed to get a nursing position in 1909. Due to the Illinois Nurses and Practices Act, Repa attend the St. Mary of Nazareth School of Nursing in Chicago, graduating in 1912. She received her nursing license in 1914. Soon after, she was hired by the Western Electric company to work in the hospital wing of the massive Hawthorne Works facility in Cicero, Illinois. Alongside working as a company nurse, Repa worked for The Nurses Alumnae Association of St. Mary of Nazareth, reaching the rank of program committee member by June 1915.

== Eastland Disaster ==
On 24 July 1915, Helen Repa was prepared to attend the annual Western Electric company picnic in Michigan City, Indiana. Repa was one of three nurses selected to staff the nurse's station. It was expected to be a day full of bruised knees at best. Repa had booked passage on the SS Theodore Roosevelt, the second ship to leave for the excursion. When the trolley car she was riding suddenly stopped, Repa got out and argued with a mounted police officer, who mentioned a ship had rolled over in the Chicago River. Disobeying orders to stay put, Repa jumped onto the back of an ambulance and arrived at the river's edge. Through the huddled masses of people, she could see the steamer SS Eastland rolled over to its side; hundreds were already dead, and many more were dying. Repa was only let through because of her nurse's uniform. She nearly slipped and fell, climbing onto the steamship's upturned hull. When she got up to see the aftermath, it was almost too much to bear.

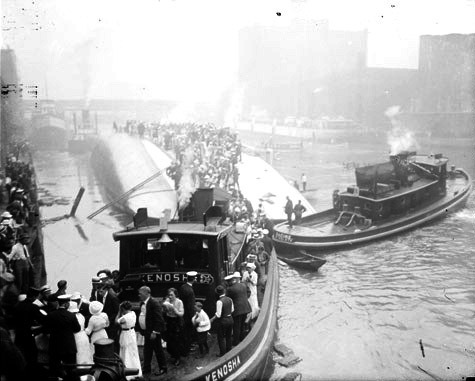
SS Eastland on its side

"I shall never be able to forget what I saw. People were struggling in the water, clustered so thickly that they literally covered the surface of the river. A few were swimming; the rest were floundering about, some clinging to a life raft that had floated free, others clutching at anything they could reach—at bits of wood, at each other, grabbing each other, pulling each other down, and screaming! The screaming was the most horrible of all."

The Eastland had rolled over roughly at 7:30 AM, Repa arrived at about 7:40 AM, the first medical personnel on station. Repa rapidly took command of the rescue operation. Any survivor dragged out of the water or the ship itself, she attended to, bandaging wounds, making sure they were alive. Local film crews managed to briefly capture Repa in footage intended for newsreels. When a police surgeon named Thomas Carter began handing out needles with strychnine to use as a stimulant, Repa began using them. If a victim displayed no signs of life, she would merely yell, "Gone," and move along. Repa yelled for lungmotors, a device used to forcibly revive victims, but they would not arrive until 10:00 AM. Repa grimly noted, that out of the hundreds pulled out of the water by firemen and police, only a handful were revived.

Sometime around 8:00 AM, Repa began making round-the-clock trips to Iroquois Memorial Hospital, named after the previous worst disaster in Chicago history, the Iroquois Theater Fire of 1903. Repa eventually stayed at the hospital because only two nurses were on staff. Repa found hundreds of shivering survivors in the halls and, with permission, moved them to a nearby boiler room to keep them warm, alongside getting them soup and coffee from nearby restaurants. She also ordered 500 blankets from the Marshall Field & Company department store, sending the bill to Western Electric. As soon as a patient was deemed well enough to go home, Repa would flag down a passing car and tell the driver where to go. Astonishingly, not a single driver refused to help. Ultimately, at least 250 survivors were assisted at Iroquois Memorial.

Around 9:00 or 9:30 AM, Repa returned to the disaster site after enough volunteer nurses had arrived at the hospital, only being let in after putting on her Red Cross armband. The lungmotors, in time, arrived and were helpful, but the masses on the dock were becoming more of a hindrance. Repa's attempts to resuscitate victims were made all but pointless by people getting in the way. Bodies were also strewn about on the dock; something had to change. At one point, a reporter took a photo of Repa helping a man. Repa asked a nearby police officer if there was a medical command center to better direct the rescue operation and to temporarily house the bodies. She was told there wasn't. She suggested the nearby Reid, Murdoch & Co. Building grocery store, local officials agreed with Repa.

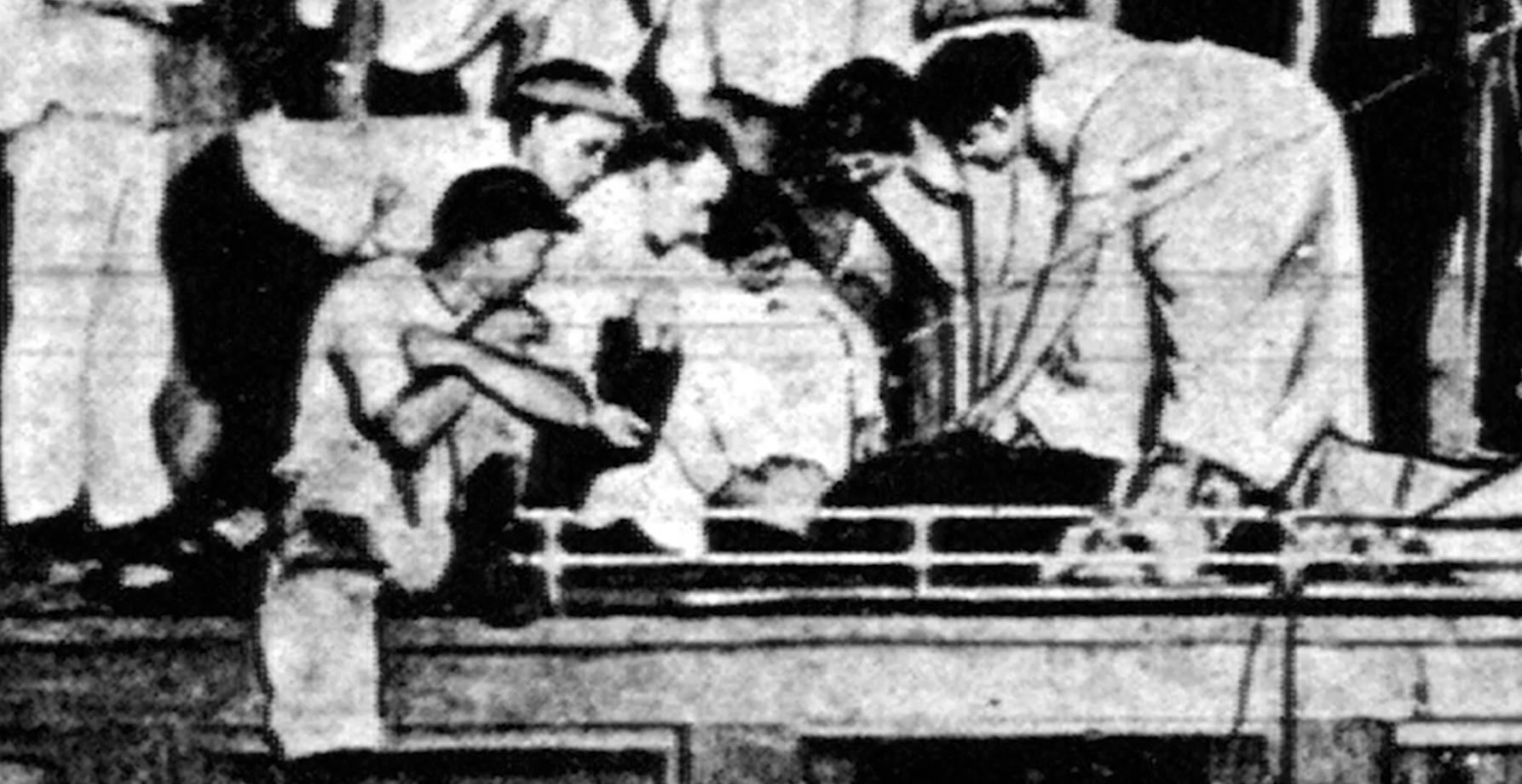
Repa (center) with a victim of the SS Eastland

Repa continued to assist the living and the dead in the Reid Murdoch building. When not attending to a survivor, she was picking up bodies from the dock and moving them to the temporary morgue. On one trip, she encountered a dazed survivor who only muttered that he had lost them all. While helping a patient, Repa heard a woman cry out her name; it was her sister, Frances. She had been informed her sister had died in the disaster, and was shocked to see her alive. After getting back to work, a fireman noticed Repa was shaking from the cold, her coat had been lost hours ago, he tossed her a lost skirt to keep warm.

At 4:00 PM, eight hours after arriving at the Chicago River, Helen Repa went home. More experienced nurses and doctors had arrived, and she was exhausted. She flagged down a passing car, and went home. Her white uniform was caked in blood, mud, and sweat. She changed into some new clothing, and collapsed. Ultimately, 844 men, women, and children died in the Eastland Disaster. How many lives she directly saved, is unknown.

== Later life ==
Repa sat for only one interview concerning her actions on July 24, 1915, for the company newsletter Western Electric News on July 28. Her account was printed in the August edition under the name "Experiences of a Hawthorne Nurse." Her actions were greatly praised by medical personnel. Head doctor W.A. Lucas would write of Repa, "There is one girl…who deserves all the credit that anyone could give her, and that's Miss Repa…That girl did a day's work that ought not to be forgotten."

Many heroes of the Eastland Disaster were later rewarded with a six-pointed star-shaped badge, given out by Cook County Coroner Peter M. Hoffman. Repa never received one. Only one woman was awarded a badge, Chicago police detective Alice Clement. She quit Western Electric soon after the disaster, she was not listed in the staff of the Hawthorne Works hospital in 1916. By 1919, she had become a director at The Nurses Alumnae Association of St. Mary of Nazareth, but for unknown reasons, she moved to Groveton, Texas, after 1920. There, she met her husband, former World War I soldier and truck driver Frank Tomek, they had one child, Frank Jr, in 1922.

Sometime in the mid-1920s, Repa returned to Chicago, now going as Helen Repa Tomek. She took care of her mother Katarina until her death from acute kidney inflammation in 1928. In the 1930s during the Great Depression, she worked as a staff nurse at Oak Forest Infirmary in Oak Forest, Illinois.

In 1937, she was diagnosed with breast cancer. Despite surgery to remove it, it spread to the stomach, a death sentence in the era. Repa's sister Mary was the nurse who took care of her in the last few months.

Helen Repa died of stomach carcinoma on 21 November 1938, at the age of 54, surrounded by family at home. Her death attracted only a brief mention in the American Journal of Nursing, with no mention of the Eastland Disaster. Frank Tomek would live until 1954. Frank Jr would live until 1996.

== In popular culture ==
Repa appears in the 2019 documentary, "Eastland: Chicago's Deadliest Day."

== See also ==
- Mary McCann, heroic nurse from the burning of the PS General Slocum.
- Violet Jessop, nurse who survived the sinking of the HMHS Britannic.
