= Adella Wotherspoon =

Last survivor of the General Slocum

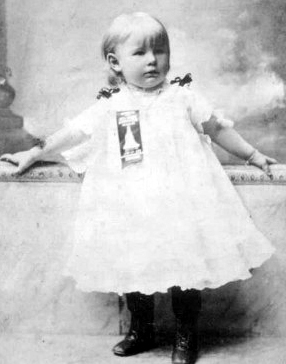
- Adella Wotherspoon at 18 months old at the dedication of the memorial to the victims of the General Slocum fire.
- Born: Adele Martha Liebenow; November 28, 1903; Manhattan, New York, U.S.
- Died: January 26, 2004 (aged 100); Roseland, New Jersey, U.S.
- Known for: Last living survivor of the General Slocum disaster
- Spouse: James Wotherspoon

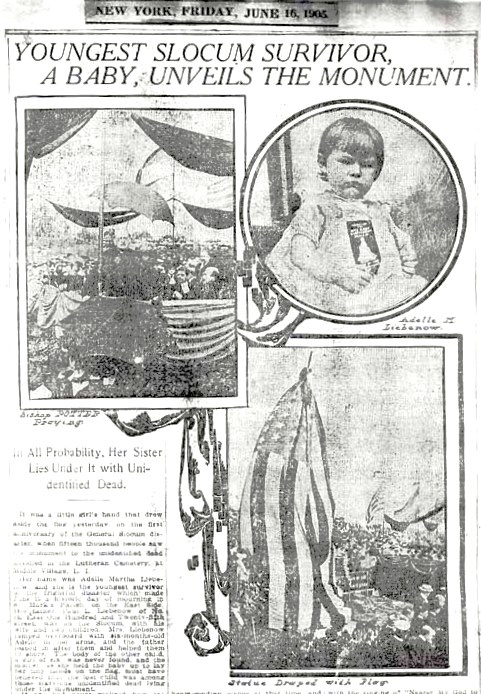
June 16, 1905

Adella Wotherspoon (1903–2004) in 1996

Adella Liebenow Wotherspoon (November 28, 1903 – January 26, 2004) was the youngest and last living survivor of the General Slocum disaster of June 15, 1904.

== Birth and siblings ==
Born Adele Martha Liebenow in Manhattan, she was the daughter of Anna Liebenow (1872–1957) and Paul Liebenow (1871–1910). She was nicknamed Tiby Liebenow. Her siblings Anna C. Liebenow Jr. (1901–1904) and Helen Liebenow (1898–1904) died in the fire on the PS General Slocum. Helen's body was never identified and is presumed buried in a mass grave. Two cousins and two aunts also perished in the fire. One of the relatives who died was Martha Liebenow (1875–1904) of 404 5th Street in Manhattan. Adella's family was listed as living at 133 East 125th Street in the official register of General Slocum deaths.

Shortly after the sinking, her parents legally changed her first name to "Adella".

== Fire aftermath ==
After the fire, Adella was treated at Lebanon Hospital. At the dedication ceremony, she pulled the rope to release the American flag and unveil the memorial to the fire victims. After her father's death in 1910, Anna moved the family to Watchung, New Jersey. Adella attended Plainfield High School, then studied education at Trenton Normal School, now known as The College of New Jersey. She taught for one year at Cleveland High School in Cranford, New Jersey then taught business administration at Plainfield High School from 1925 until 1961 when she retired. She married James Wotherspoon (1903–1982), but the couple had no children.

== Commemoration ==
The young Wotherspoon played a highly visible role in unveiling a commemorative statue in the cemetery where more than sixty unidentified dead were buried on the first anniversary of the disaster. She returned annually for the memorial ceremonies.

== Death and burial ==
Wotherspoon was a resident of a convalescent home in Berkeley Heights, New Jersey for the last several years of her life. She died in 2004, aged 100, and was cremated. Her ashes were buried alongside her husband's at the Wilson Memorial Union Church Cemetery in Watchung, New Jersey.

== See also ==
- Catherine Uhlmyer, second to last survivor
