= Mary McCann =

New York ship disaster hero (1890–1966)

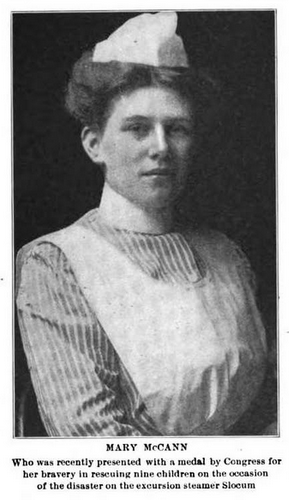
- Mary McCann in 1909
- Born: 1890; Ireland
- Died: May 1966 (aged about 76); Paterson, New Jersey, United States
- Citizenship: United States
- Education: Florence Crittenton Training School
- Occupation: Nurse
- Known for: Rescuing passengers aboard PS General Slocum during its sinking
- Spouse: David A. M. Perlman (1916–)
- Children: 4

Mary Ann McCann (1890–1966) was an Irish-born American woman who was awarded the Silver Lifesaving Medal for rescuing passengers, including up to nine children, from the 1904 General Slocum disaster in New York City.

== Early life ==
Mary McCann immigrated to the United States from Athlone in Ireland, arriving in Ellis Island on April 24, 1904. She had been given money for a train ticket back to the convent school which she had attended for years; her parents expected her to become a teacher. Instead, McCann bought passage on a ship bound for New York City.

== Sudden fame ==
In June 1904, the teenaged McCann was recovering from measles and scarlet fever, when she witnessed the fire aboard the PS General Slocum from the hospital where she was quarantined on North Brother Island. McCann, reportedly a strong swimmer, waded into the East River and helped passengers to safety, including as many as nine children. On McCann's final journey to rescue passengers, a man fell from a burning flagpole aboard ship and landed on top of her in the river, breaking her arm. He sank his teeth into her shoulder in an attempt to stay afloat. McCann could not free herself from him, but managed to keep above water until she was rescued. She was taken to a hospital, where she remained unconscious for several days. When she woke, they told her that the man who fell on her was dead, and that they had been forced to pry his locked jaw open to remove his teeth from her shoulder.

While hospitalized for the injuries she sustained that night and for her preexisting scarlet fever, McCann also caught diphtheria. She reported that two of the children she saved caught scarlet fever from her during the rescue and died.

== Aftermath ==
Her role in the rescue of Slocum survivors was publicized nationally, often with editorial commentary on her immigrant status. "And learned men talk of the danger of immigration to this country!" marveled the Spokane Press. "May Ireland send us many another Mary McCann." McCann received hundreds of proposals of marriage by mail, from men who read of her feat. Lawyer Francis Patrick Garvan offered McCann housing and funds for her education, after her testimony at the coroner's inquest.

Although she was recognized for her heroism by the coroner's investigation and by the Volunteer Life Saving Society, she was "overlooked" by the Carnegie Hero Fund Commission in 1906. In 1908, McCann was a nurse in training, and the only woman among the nine people awarded silver Lifesaving Medals by the United States Congress, for courageous action on the night of the disaster. She received the medal in person a few months later, when it was presented to her by the Speaker of the House, Joseph Gurney Cannon.

McCann found work as a cashier later in 1904. She attended the Florence Crittenton Training School in Washington, D. C. She lived at the Florence Crittenton Mission Home in New York for a time as a young woman.

== Later years ==
Mary McCann married David A. M. Perlman in 1916. They had four daughters. She died in May 1966, at Barnegat Memorial Hospital in Paterson, New Jersey.

== See also ==
- Helen Repa, heroic nurse who saved lives during the SS Eastland Disaster.
- Violet Jessop, nurse who survived the sinking of the HMHS Britannic.
