= Resurrection man =

Resurrection man or resurrection men may refer to:

- A term for a body snatcher—a person who secretly exhumes dead bodies to sell them

== Characters ==
- Resurrection Man, the antagonist of the serial novel The Mysteries of London
- Resurrection Man (character), a DC Comics character debuting in 1997

== Arts and entertainment ==
- The Resurrection Man, a 1992 novel by Charlotte MacLeod
- Resurrection Man, a 1994 novel by Eoin McNamee
  - Resurrection Man (film), a 1998 film adaptation directed by Marc Evans
- Resurrection Man, a 1995 novel by Sean Stewart
- Resurrection Men, a 2002 novel by Ian Rankin, the thirteenth in the Inspector Rebus novel series
  - "Resurrection Men" (Rebus), a 2007 episode of the television series Rebus
- Resurrection Men, a 2007 novel by T. K. Welsh
- "Resurrection Man", a song on Lamb of God's 2020 album Lamb of God

== See also ==
- The Resurrected Man, a 1954 novel by E. C. Tubb
- The Resurrected Man, a 1998 novel by Sean Williams
- Body Snatcher (disambiguation)
- Resurrectionist
