= Catherine Uhlmyer =

American centenarian and survivor of the General Slocum disaster

Catherine Uhlmyer Connelly
- Born: Catherine Uhlmyer; April 4, 1893; Manhattan, New York, US
- Died: October 17, 2002 (aged 109); Wilton, Connecticut, US
- Known for: Surviving the General Slocum disaster
- Spouse: Thomas Connelly
- Children: 11

Catherine Uhlmyer Connelly (April 4, 1893 – October 17, 2002) was the second-to-last, and the longest-lived survivor of the General Slocum disaster of June 15, 1904.

== Biography ==
She was born as Catherine Uhlmyer in Manhattan, New York, on April 4, 1893. Her father died before she was a year old, and her mother, Veronica, married John Gallagher.

On June 15, 1904, when she was 11 years old, she was one of the passengers aboard the PS General Slocum when it caught fire on the East River in New York City. She remembered a boy shouting "fire" while a brass band was playing on the deck of the ship to entertain the travelers. She recounted the images of mothers and children with their clothing on fire drowning in the rough waters of Hell Gate. Others were killed as they were drawn into the blades of the paddlewheel. The total death count was 1,021 of the 1,331 passengers who were on a Sunday school outing, and among the victims were her mother, her nine-year-old brother Walter, and her 9-month-old sister Agnes. "Sometimes he is very cruel, the man upstairs," she said in her interview with The New York Times on May 24, 1989, when she was already 96. This remained the largest single disaster in New York until the September 11, 2001 attacks.

In 1913, she married Thomas Connelly, a truck driver. She had 11 children. Ten of them were born at home. Only two were alive at the time of her death, Jeanette Connelly Meehan, who lived in Goshen, New York, and Elizabeth Gallagher Reilly, who lived in Greenwich, Connecticut.

She lived in a Manhattan apartment by herself until she was 102. She then moved to a nursing home in Connecticut to be closer to her daughter Elizabeth. She died on October 17, 2002, aged 109.

== See also ==
- Adella Wotherspoon, the last survivor
