= Zion-St. Mark's Evangelical Lutheran Church =

Church in Manhattan, New York

- U.S. National Register of Historic Places
- New York State Register of Historic Places
- Zion-St. Mark's Evangelical Lutheran Church (formerly known as Deutsche Evangelische Kirche von Yorkville and Zion Lutheran Church) (2026)

- Location within New York City Location within New York Location within the United States
- Location: 339—341 E. 84th St., New York, New York
- Coordinates: 40°46′34″N 73°57′4″W
- Area: less than one acre
- Built: 1888
- Architect: Michael J. Fitz Mahony; Beyer & Tivy
- Architectural style: Late Victorian, Victorian Eclectic
- NRHP reference No.: 95000335
- NYSRHP No.: 06101.006762

Significant dates
- Added to NRHP: March 23, 1995
- Designated NYSRHP: November 28, 1994

Zion-St. Mark's Evangelical Lutheran Church, formerly known as Deutsche Evangelische Kirche von Yorkville and Zion Lutheran Church, is a historic Lutheran church building at 339-341 East 84th Street in Yorkville, Manhattan, New York City. The congregation was a member of the Evangelical Lutheran Church in America. A final service of Holy Closure led by Bishop Katrina Foster of the ELCA Metro New York Synod took place on February 1, 2026.

== Building ==
The neo-Gothic structure was built in 1888 as the Deutsche Evangelische Kirche von Yorkville. The building became Zion Lutheran Church in 1892, when that congregation was founded. It is now Zion-St. Mark's Church. The German-speaking congregation grew rapidly with the influx of mass immigration from Germany to the United States at the end of the 19th and the beginning of the 20th centuries. The congregation merged with St. Mark's Evangelical Lutheran Church of New York City in 1946. The building was added to the National Register of Historic Places in 1995.

== See also ==
- National Register of Historic Places listings in Manhattan from 59th to 110th Streets
