= Quinsigamond =

Massachusetts location

Quinsigamond was an Indigenous Nipmuc village that eventually became the colonial settlement and modern-day city of Worcester, Massachusetts.

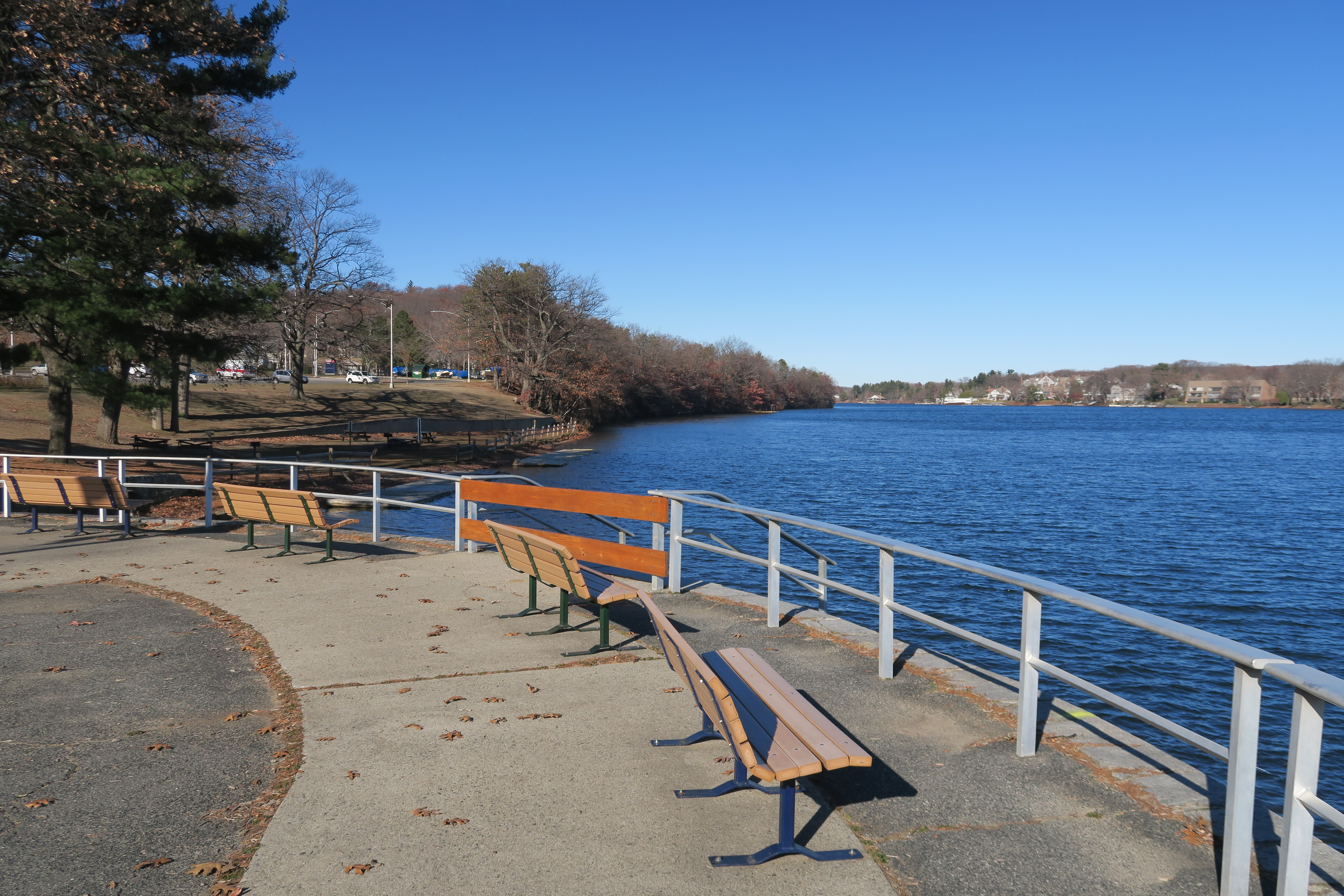
Quinsigamond State Park, Worcester MA

== Etymology ==
More than nine variations of the name have been found in historical records, including Quinsigamond, Quansigemog, Quansigamaug, Quansigamug, and Qunnosuog-amaug. In the Indigenous Algonquian language, Quinsigamond is loosely translated as "the pickerel (or long nose) fishing place." Pickerel is a type of freshwater fish native to inland lakes and ponds.

The Nipmuc people named the body of water between Worcester and Shrewsbury "Quinsigamond," the largest lake in the East. Colonial settlers adopted the name of the lake for a nearby village, and it was also the name given to the area known today as Worcester. The name of Quinsigamond Community College was also chosen to honor the cultural heritage of Worcester County.

== Pre-Colonial times ==
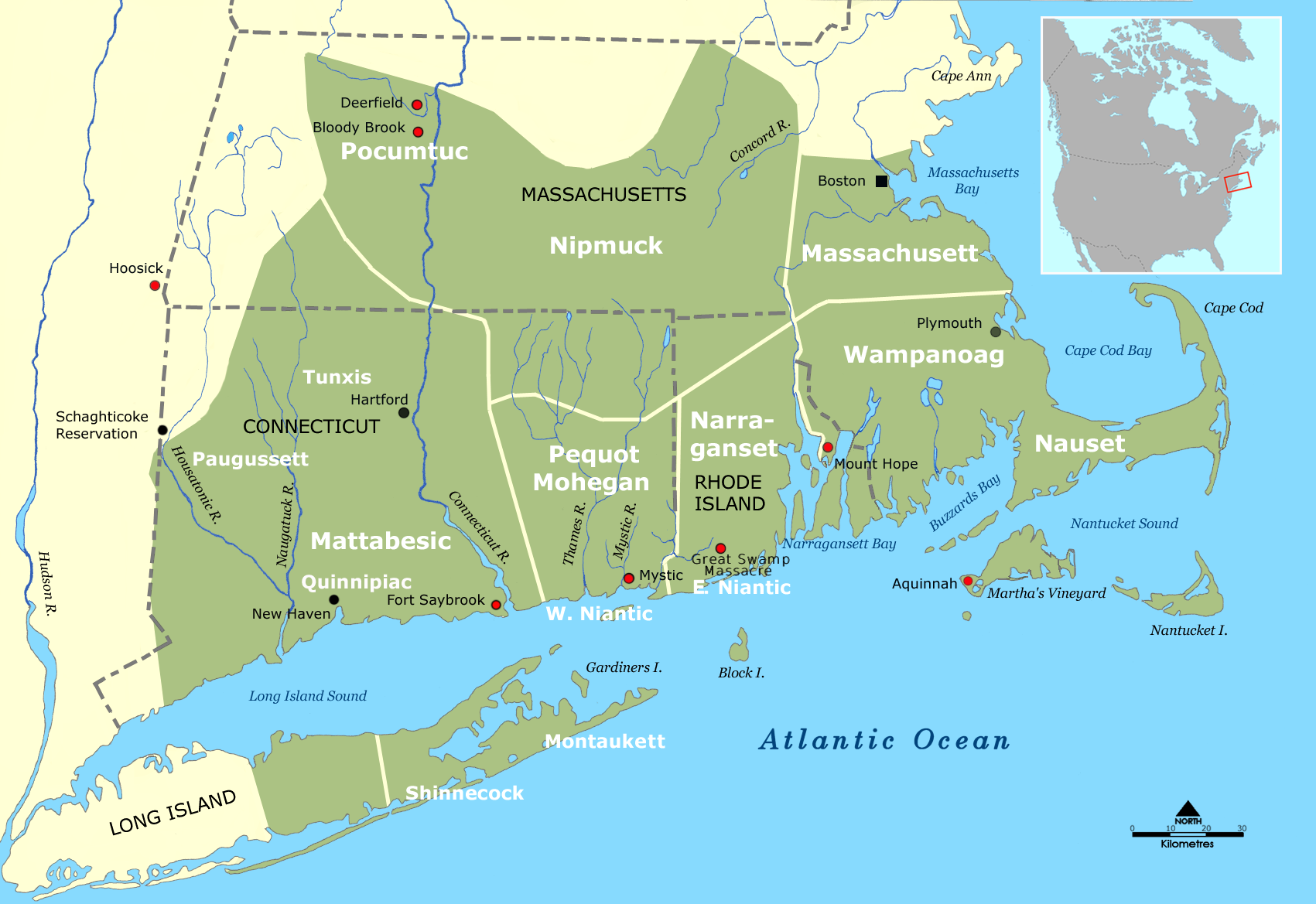
Tribal Territories in Southern New England

During the early 1600s, more than 15,000 Nipmuc Native Americans inhabited the region known today as New England. They were divided into small clans and had a nomadic lifestyle. The Nipmucs, known to have lived in areas including contemporary Worcester County, Springfield, New Hampshire, Connecticut, and Rhode Island, were the area's original settlers. This territory encompassed the central trail to all northeast regions called the "Great Path" or the Blackstone River Valley National Heritage Corridor.

The Nipmucs were known as the "freshwater fishing" tribe or "people from the small pond," since they inhabited inland areas of New England. Traditionally, the Nipmuc subsisted through a combination of hunting, fishing, gathering, and agriculture. They cultivated the "Three Sisters"—corn (maize), beans, and squash—which formed the foundation of their plant-based diet and were integral to their sustenance. Their economy depended on seasonal migrations, with communities relocating between fixed sites to exploit available resources throughout the year. This pattern of movement, along with dispersed settlement patterns, has been described as a "scattered existence," characterized by small, decentralized villages and bands rather than large, centralized towns. They also made dugout canoes, which were their primary mode of transportation on the lake.

== Colonization ==
English settlers invaded the Quinsigamond area in 1637. The first English settlement of Worcester was called the “Village of Quinsigamond,” also known as “Quinsigamond Plantation.”

As part of a missionary project initiated by Reverend John Eliot, “praying towns” were established in an effort to replace traditional spiritual practices with Christianity.

The indigenous population resisted settlement in conflicts and uprisings. Despite resistance, the colonial invasion had a devastating and lasting impact on the Nipmuc people's culture, governance structures, population, and land. Many Indigenous people were killed, disbanded to other territories, or sold into slavery.

== Land Rights Law ==
The English provided minimal compensation to Nipmuc people living in occupied Nipmuc land. In 1652, the Indian Land Rights Law was passed, which stated that Indian tribes would forfeit the title of their land if they had not improved upon it. This led displaced Nipmuc peoples to join King Philip's War.

== King Philip's War (1675-1676) ==
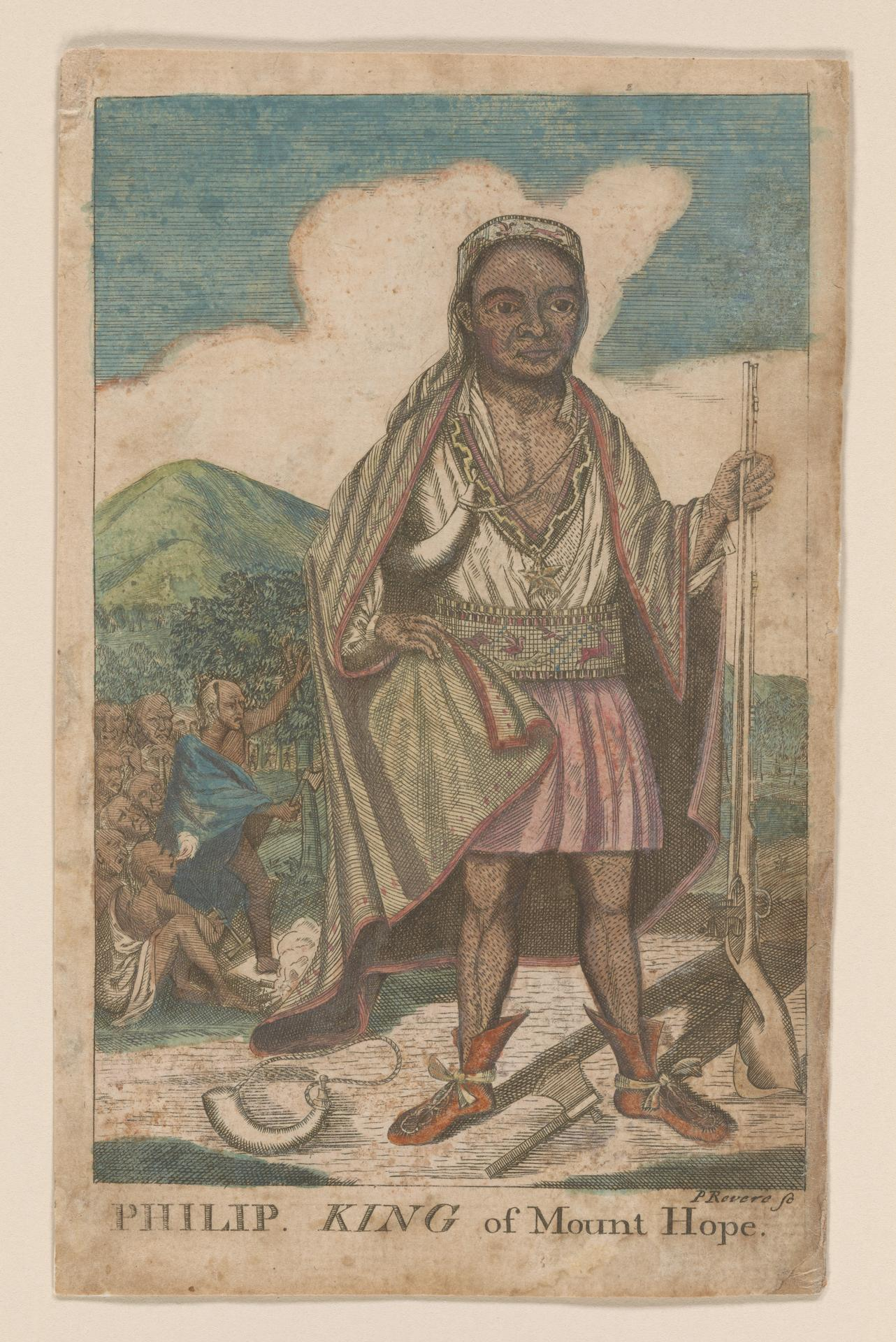
Paul Revere's imaginative depiction of Metacomet, 1772. Mabel Brady Garvan Collection, Yale University Art Gallery.

King Philip’s War was a conflict between several Indigenous groups in New England and English colonial settlers. It was led in large part by the Wampanoag sachem Metacomet, known to the English as King Philip. Tensions arose over colonial expansion, land dispossession, and political control, particularly in areas surrounding Plymouth Colony.

The war was widespread, resulting in the damage or destruction of many English settlements. By the end of the conflict, numerous towns in central Massachusetts, including settlements between Marlborough and Grafton, had been burned or abandoned.

Following the war, many surviving Nipmuc people were captured by colonial forces and forcibly removed. Some were detained on Deer Island in Boston Harbor, where they faced severe shortages of food, clothing, and shelter. Others were confined to reservations in what is now Worcester County. These actions caused significant population loss and long-term displacement. By the end of the conflict, the Nipmuc population had been reduced to fewer than 1,000 people.

== Industrialization of Worcester ==
In 1684, the English settlers of Quinsigamond Village changed their community name to "Worcester" to honor the King of England's defeat during the English Civil War. They settled around modern-day Lincoln Square, Main Street, and the present Worcester Common. The area was abandoned in 1702 due to fears of indigenous resistance and was resettled in 1713. Worcester became a town in 1722 and a city in 1848.

English colonists used the lake for recreational sports like swimming, boating, and fishing. In the 20^{th} century, the Quinsigamond Lake area grew into an amusement park tourist attraction offering picnic areas, boat rides, concerts, a dance hall, and a rollerskating rink. Horace Bigelow purchased much of the land around the lake for summer homes. He also owned much of the lake real estate and boasted to friends that the park was drenched in "fifty thousand electric lights." Thus, the east side of the lake area (now in the town of Shrewsbury) was nicknamed "White City." Competitive rowing was extremely popular on the lake. The Olympic rowing trials were held on Lake Quinsigamond in 1952.

== Modern day ==
Today, about 2,000 Nipmuc people live on the Chaubunagungamaug Reservation area in Webster and the Hassanamisco Reservation in Grafton. Many continue the old way of life and carry on the traditions of their ancestors. The Quinsigamond Lake region is no longer home to an amusement park but a shopping area, and there are two state parks on the lake. Quinsigamond Lake remains popular for recreational use. Many college and area club rowing crews continue to utilize the lake. As the second-largest city in Massachusetts, Worcester became known as "Heart of the Commonwealth."

Jack O'Connell wrote a group of mystery novels set in the fictional city of Quinsigamond.

Quinsigamond Community College is one of the eight colleges and universities in the Worcester area. It has also continued to bear the original name of "Quinsigamond,” representing the rich cultural history of the region's Indigenous people.

The descendants of the native inhabitants of Quinsigamond continue to defend their ancestral rights, preserve their cultural legacy and advocate for representation. Nipmuc people applied for state recognition of their tribal identity in the 1980s, which was rejected at a federal level but is acknowledged at the state level. Campaigns to return ancestral lands to Nipmuc people have been successful elsewhere in Massachusetts and are ongoing.
