= James McGee (author) =

English novelist

- Occupation: Writer
- Writing career
- Genres: Thriller, Historical adventure
- Website: www.jamesmcgee.uk

James McGee is an English novelist known for his historical adventure novels about a fictional Bow Street Runner, Matthew Hawkwood.

James McGee was born in Kent, but, as an army child, spent his childhood in Gibraltar, Germany and Northern Ireland. He has worked in various trades and professions including banking, newspapers and bookselling.

== Matthew Hawkwood novels ==
McGee's historical novels are set during the Regency period, when Britain was at war with Napoleon. His hero, Matthew Hawkwood, is working as a Bow Street Runner, an early investigative officer working out of London's Bow Street Magistrates' Court. He is called upon to solve a number of civil crimes, including murder, body-snatching and highway robbery, but his previous military experience makes him ably suited to investigate issues of national security.

Hawkwood has a complicated back-story, which is touched upon at various stages of the novels. He once served as an officer in the 95th Rifles, but was cashiered after he killed a fellow officer in a duel. With Wellington's intervention, he was spared a court-martial, and joined the Spanish Guerrilleros, liaising with the British intelligence officer Colquhoun Grant. It is Grant's influence that enables Hawkwood to get a job at Bow Street on his return to England.

McGee's creation of Hawkwood's past was deliberate, as he wanted a hero who was "at home in both the military and criminal worlds". Many reviewers and readers have drawn similarities between Hawkwood and the author Bernard Cornwell's Sharpe, particularly as they both served in the Rifles. McGee admits this similarity was a concern for him, but giving Hawkwood a background in the Rifle Brigade was important to the plot. Some reviewers also see Hawkwood as the Regency version of Jack Reacher the hero of a series of books written by the British author Lee Child.

Much of the action within the novels is inspired by historical events. The plot of Ratcatcher is based on the secret development of the first submarines by the American Robert Fulton, then working for the French. Resurrectionist is darker, reflecting the underworld of "resurrectionists" who stole bodies to supply the anatomy schools of London, and the experimentation of early (and illegal) organ transplant and resuscitation. Rapscallion focuses on French prisoners-of-war held on the prison hulks. Rebellion sees Hawkwood assigned to the Alien Office, the forerunner of Britain's Secret Intelligence Service. He is dispatched to Paris to liaise with a cadre of renegade French generals who are attempting to overthrow Napoleon Bonaparte. The plot is centred on the attempted coup, which became known as the Malet Conspiracy.

=== List of titles ===
- (1985) Trigger Men
- (1989) Crow's War
- (1990) Wolf's Lair
- (2006) Ratcatcher, London: HarperCollins, ISBN 978-0-00-721266-8 The First Matthew Hawkwood novel.
- (2007) Resurrectionist
- (2008) Rapscallion
- (2011) Rebellion
- (2014) The Blooding
- (2017) The Reckoning
- (2022) The Salma Option

== Critical reception ==
McGee's novels have been generally well received by the critics. The period detail, likeable hero and fast-paced-action have commended the books to many reviewers. Authors Reginald Hill and Andrew Taylor have also praised the novels.
