= Resurrectionist (novel) =

2007 novel by James McGee

- Author: James McGee
- Language: English
- Genre: Historical mystery, Crime, Thriller, Spy, Detective, Mystery fiction
- Publisher: HarperCollins
- Publication date: 2007
- Publication place: United Kingdom
- Media type: Print (Paperback)
- ISBN: 978-0-00-721271-2
- Preceded by: Ratcatcher
- Followed by: Rapscallion

Resurrectionist is a historical mystery novel by author James McGee. It is the sequel to McGee's best-selling Ratcatcher.

== Summary ==
Former army officer turned London Bow Street Runner, Matthew Hawkwood is back in this sequel. He is trying to solve two bizarre murders. There are missing bodies and missing people. 'Resurrection men' serve the demands of the city's surgeons by stealing corpses, but creating a few of their own along the way.

== Main characters ==
- Matthew Hawkwood: A London Bow Street Runner, he is the novel's main protagonist. His previous military experience proves very helpful. He is cunning, and at times ruthless, but all for the cause of justice. He has connections to the criminal underworld.
- Colonel Titus Xavier Hyde/Dodd: The novel's main antagonist. He is a former colonel, and an escapee of an asylum, who was recognised as one of the most gifted field surgeons in the army.
- Chief Magistrate James Read: The chief Magistrate. He assigns Hawkwood to carry out the case and uses his political influence to aid Hawkwood.
- John Hopkins: A young junior officer, who is very spirited and determined. He works hard under Hawkwood, even saving his life at one point. Hawkwood rates him very highly.
- Sawney: The ruthless leader of a resurrectionist gang. Also a former wagon driver in the army.
- Magget: Sawney's right-hand man, often required to do the heavy work.
- Sal Bridger: Sawney's whore.
- Eden Carslow: A brilliant surgeon and associate of Titus Hyde.
- Sergeant Jago
- Major Lomax
