= Jack O'Connell (author) =

American author (1959–2024)

- Born: December 25, 1959; Worcester, Massachusetts, U.S.
- Died: January 1, 2024 (aged 64); Worcester, Massachusetts, U.S.
- Education: College of the Holy Cross (BA)
- Occupation: Author
- Spouse: Nancy
- Children: 2

Jack O'Connell (December 25, 1959 – January 1, 2024) was an American author of noir crime fiction and speculative fiction novels. He lived in Worcester, Massachusetts, with his wife, Nancy, and two children. He was a student and taught at the College of the Holy Cross in Worcester. O'Connell died on January 1, 2024, at the age of 64.

== Career ==
O'Connell stated that the post-industrial urban decay of Worcester was an influence on Quinsigamond, the fictional city where his novels are set.

From 1997 to 2008, he served as the editor of Holy Cross Magazine.

== Bibliography ==
=== Novels ===
- Box Nine (Mysterious Press, 1992)
- Wireless (Mysterious Press, 1993)
- The Skin Palace (Mysterious Press, 1996)
- Word Made Flesh (Mysterious Press, 1999)
- The Resurrectionist (Algonquin Books, 2008)

=== Anthologies (as editor) ===
- Dark Alleys of Noir (Delta Productions, 2002)

== Awards ==
- Shirley Jackson Award (2008, Finalist)
- Prix Mystère de la critique (2010, France)
- Grand Prix de l'Imaginaire (2010, France)
