= J. G. Sandom =

American businessman and author (born 1956)

J.G. Sandom
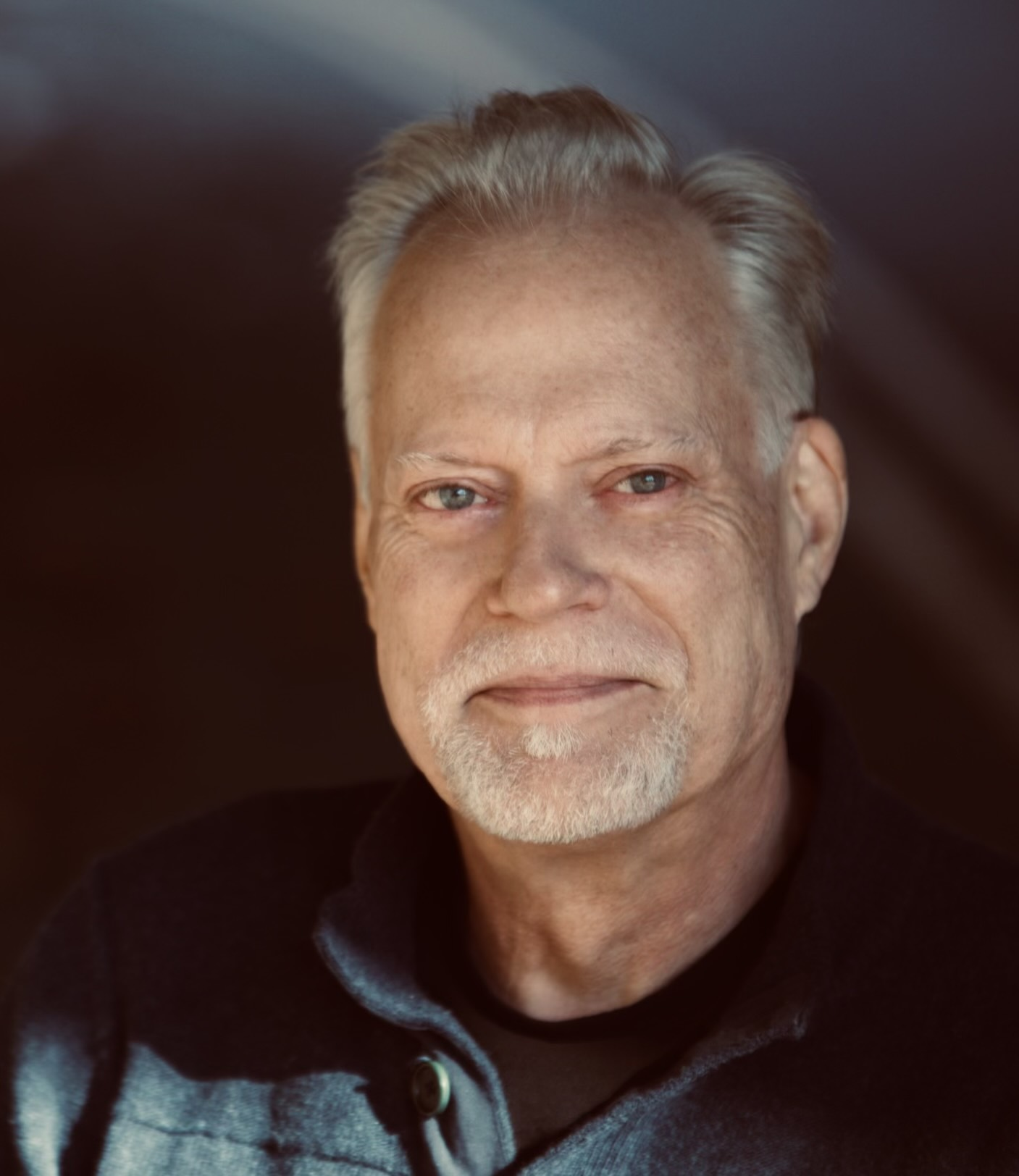

J. G. Sandom (born December 19, 1956) is an American businessman and author, who co-founded the nation's first digital advertising agency, Einstein and Sandom Interactive (EASI), in 1984.

== Life and work ==
Sandom grew up in Europe, passing five years in Rome, and was educated at Winchester College. In 1984, Sandom co-founded Einstein and Sandom Interactive (EASI). In 1994 it was purchased by D'Arcy Masius Benton & Bowles. From January 1997 to October 1999, Sandom served as Director of Interactive at OgilvyOne Worldwide, a division of Ogilvy & Mather. Sandom built OgilvyInteractive to $300 million in billings, and Adweek credited him with turning Ogilvy's digital offering around. From October 1999 Sandom served as president and CEO, and then vice chairman of RappDigital Worldwide, an arm of the agency Omnicom.

Sandom is the author of eleven novels. He writes novels for adults under his own name and has used the pen name T.K. Welsh for some of his young adult (YA) books. Ranked one of the Top Ten Children's Books of 2006 by the Washington Post, his debut novel for young adults Kiss Me, I'm Dead (originally released under the title The Unresolved), was nominated for a Young Adult Library Services Association 2007 "Teens' Top Ten", named a 2007 Association of Jewish Libraries "Notable Book for Teens" by the Sydney Taylor Book Award Committee, and nominated for the 2006 "Cybils" award. The Washington Post said that Sandom "writes with a precision and delicacy unusual for YA fiction" and called the novel, "a subtle gem".

Sandom's novel, The Wave, was reissued in June 2010 by Cornucopia Press. Kirkus Reviews said Sandom's characterizations of heroes and "stock bad guys" were drifting into caricature but lauded the story's pacing, concluding: "A story with enough manic energy to be worthy of a nuclear explosion and enough to render moot any structural weaknesses in its architecture."

== Bibliography ==
Title	Publication date(s)	ISBN	Translated title(s)	Notes
The Seed of Icarus	1975			unpublished
The Blue Men	1981	ISBN 978-0997673937		
Gospel Truths	1992, 2007	ISBN 978-0385422338	Spanish (La Fuente de la Verdad, unauthorized)	A Joseph Koster Mystery
The Wall Street Murder Club	1993, 2013	ISBN 978-0985695415	German (Kaltes Erwachen), Dutch (In het kille Ochtendlicht), Danish (Jagtklubben), Japanese (悪友クラブの殺人)	Originally titled The Hunting Club. Optioned by Warner Bros. for theatrical development
The Publicist	1996, 2011	ISBN 978-1463618896		Under the pen name Veronica Wright
The Wave	2002, 2010	ISBN 978-1452839233		A John Decker Thriller
Kiss Me, I'm Dead	2006, 2010, 2024	ISBN 978-0997673968/ISBN 978-0997673951	German (Die Unerlöste)	Originally titled The Unresolved under the pen name T.K. Welsh
Confessions of a Teenage Body Snatcher	2007, 2010	ISBN 978-0525476993		
The God Machine	2009	ISBN 978-0553589979	Turkish (Tanrı Makinesi), Spanish (La Máquina de Dios, unauthorized)	A Joseph Koster Mystery
Two Teen Terrors	2010	ISBN 978-1453859056		Collecting Kiss Me, I'm Dead and Confessions of a Teenage Body Snatcher
404	2014	ISBN 978-0985695484		A John Decker Thriller
dEATH in dAVOS	2016	ISBN 978-0997673913		A Robin Beauvais Manifesto
