= German Evangelical Lutheran Church of St. Mark =

Former church in Manhattan, New York

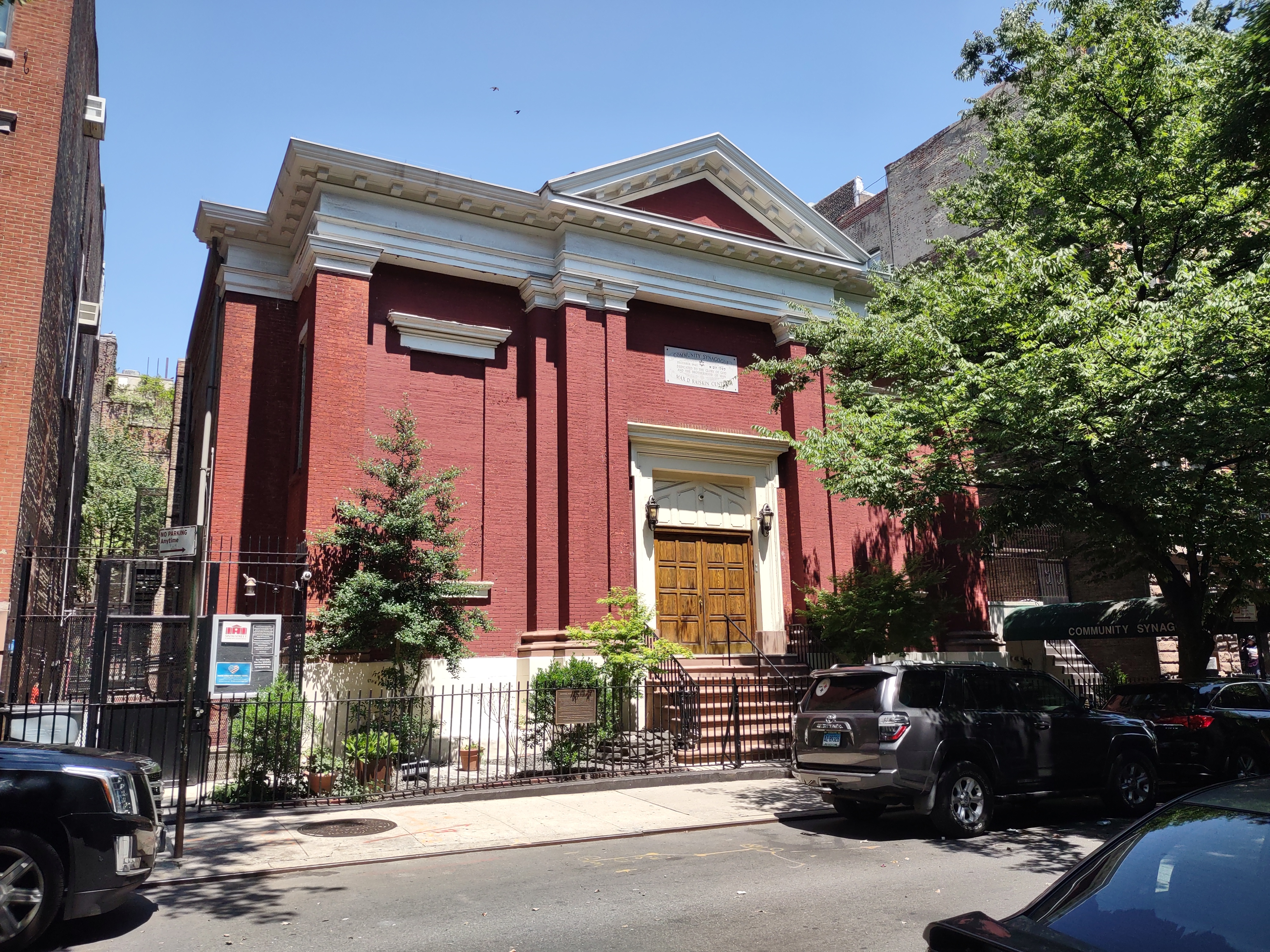
- German Evangelical Lutheran Church of St. Mark in 2024
- German Evangelical Lutheran Church of St. Mark
- 40°43′37″N 73°59′14″W
- Address: 323 East 6th Street, Lower Manhattan, New York City, New York 10001
- Country: United States
- Previous denomination: Lutheranism

History
- Status: Church (1847 – 1940); Synagogue (since 1940)
- Founder: Evangelical Lutheran Church of St. Matthew

Architecture
- Architectural type: Church
- Style: Renaissance Revival
- Completed: 1847
- Closed: 1940 (as a church); 1946 (as a congregation)
- German Evangelical Lutheran Church of St. Mark
- U.S. National Register of Historic Places
- U.S. Historic district – Contributing property
- New York State Register of Historic Places
- NRHP reference No.: 04000296
- NYSRHP No.: 06101.007620

Significant dates
- Added to NRHP: April 15, 2004
- Designated NYSRHP: June 20, 2003

The German Evangelical Lutheran Church of St. Mark is a historic former church and current synagogue building located at 323 East 6th Street between First and Second Avenues in the East Village neighborhood of Manhattan, in New York City, New York, United States.

== Church building ==
The Renaissance Revival style former church was built in 1847 by the Evangelical Lutheran Church of St. Matthew which first rented it to St. Mark's and subsequently sold it to them in 1857. By the end of the nineteenth century the congregation was in decline as congregants were moving elsewhere. Much of the church membership was killed in the 1904 General Slocum disaster, most of the victims being women and children, and the congregation never recovered.

=== General Slocum disaster ===
In 1904, The Ladies' Aid Society (Frauenhilfsverein) chartered the General Slocum steamboat for their summer outing on the East River. The boat caught fire and over 1000 parishioners perished in one of the worst disasters in the city's history. Thereafter Germans began moving uptown from the Lower East Side, primarily to Yorkville and abandoned the church. The parish of St. Mark's merged with the Zion Church in Yorkville in 1946 to become Zion St. Mark's Evangelical Lutheran Church.

== Synagogue ==
Sixth Street Community Synagogue Max D. Raiskin Center

Religion
- Affiliation: Modern Orthodox Judaism
- Ecclesiastical or organisational status: Synagogue
- Leadership: Rabbi Gavriel Bellino
- Status: Active

Location
- Location: 323 East 6th Street, Lower Manhattan, New York City, New York 10001
- Interactive map of Sixth Street Community Synagogue; Max D. Raiskin Center

Architecture
- Established: 1940 (as a congregation)
- Completed: 1940 (as a synagogue); (previously a church)

Website
- www.sixthstreetsynagogue.org

In 1940, the church was converted to the Sixth Street Community Synagogue, located in the Max D. Raiskin Center, a Modern Orthodox Jewish congregation.

Evicted from its former premises in 2013, located at 3 West Sixteenth Street, the congregation known as the Young Israel of Fifth Avenue, subsequently merged into the Sixth Street congregation.

== Building preservation ==
The building was listed on the National Register of Historic Places in 2004, and is located within the East Village/Lower East Side Historic District, which was created in October 2012.
