= Body Snatcher (disambiguation) =

Body snatcher or The Body Snatcher may refer to:

- Body-snatcher, a person who secretly exhumes dead bodies to sell them

== Books and film adaptations ==
- "The Body Snatcher", 1884 short story by Robert Louis Stevenson
  - The Body Snatcher (1945 film), a film adaptation of Stevenson's story
- The Body Snatchers, 1955 novel by Jack Finney
  - Invasion of the Body Snatchers, 1956 film adaptation of Finney's novel
  - Invasion of the Body Snatchers (1978 film), remake of the 1956 film
  - Body Snatchers (1993 film), film adaptation of Finney's novel
  - The Invasion (film), 2007 film adaptation of Finney's novel
- The Bodysnatchers (novel), a Doctor Who novel
- Bodysnatcher (Red Dwarf), unused script for the science fiction comedy series Red Dwarf
  - The Bodysnatcher Collection, a DVD release featuring several episodes of comedy series Red Dwarf

== Music ==
- Body Snatchers (Rare Essence album), 1996
- Body Snatchers (Iron Lung Corp album), 2013
- "Bodysnatchers" (song), a song by Radiohead, from the album In Rainbows
- The Bodysnatchers (band), seven-piece all-women band involved in the British ska revival of the early 1980s
- Bodysnatcher, deathcore band

== Other ==
- The Body Snatcher (1957 film), a Mexican horror film
- "The Body Snatcher", nickname of professional boxer Mike McCallum
- Invasion of the Body Snatchas!, a video game
