= PS General Slocum =

Passenger steamboat; sank in New York City in 1904

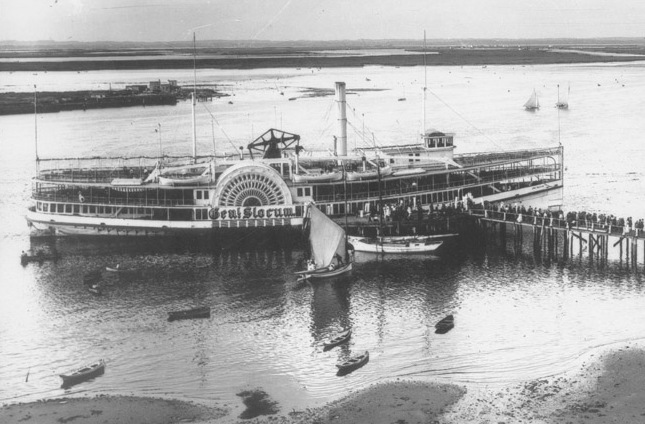
- PS General Slocum

History
- Name: 1891: General Slocum; 1905: Maryland
- Namesake: Henry Warner Slocum
- Owner: Knickerbocker Steamship Company
- Port of registry: United States
- Builder: Divine Burtis, Jr., of Brooklyn, New York, U.S.
- Laid down: December 23, 1890
- Launched: April 18, 1891
- Maiden voyage: June 25, 1891
- Fate: Burned and sank on June 15, 1904; Salvaged and converted into barge Maryland; Foundered December 4, 1911

General characteristics
- Class & type: Sidewheeler passenger ship
- Tonnage: 1,284 grt
- Length: 264 ft (80 m)
- Beam: 37.5 ft (11.4 m)
- Draft: 7.5 ft (2.3 m) unloaded; 8 ft (2.4 m) - 8.5 ft (2.6 m) loaded
- Depth: 12.3 ft (3.7 m)
- Decks: three decks
- Installed power: 1 × 53 in bore, 12 ft stroke single cylinder vertical beam steam engine
- Propulsion: Sidewheel boat; each wheel had 26 paddles and was 31 ft (9.4 m) in diameter.
- Speed: 16 knots (30 km/h)
- Crew: 22

PS General Slocum was an American passenger paddle steamer built in Brooklyn, New York, in 1891. During her service history, she was involved in a number of mishaps, including multiple groundings and collisions.

On June 15, 1904, General Slocum caught fire and sank in the East River of New York City, At the time of the disaster, she was on a chartered run carrying members of St. Mark's Evangelical Lutheran Church (German Americans from Little Germany, Manhattan) resulting in estimated 1,021 deaths out of the 1,342 people on board.

The disaster was the worst maritime disaster of the 20th century until the sinking of RMS Titanic surpassed it eight years later in 1912. It remains the worst maritime disaster in New York City history, and the second-worst on U.S. waterways, after the explosion and sinking of the steamboat Sultana. Until the September 11 attacks in 2001 was the deadliest manmade disaster of any sort in the New York area.

After the 1904 disaster, the wreck of General Slocum was converted into a barge named Maryland which itself would subsequently sink in 1911.

== Construction and design ==
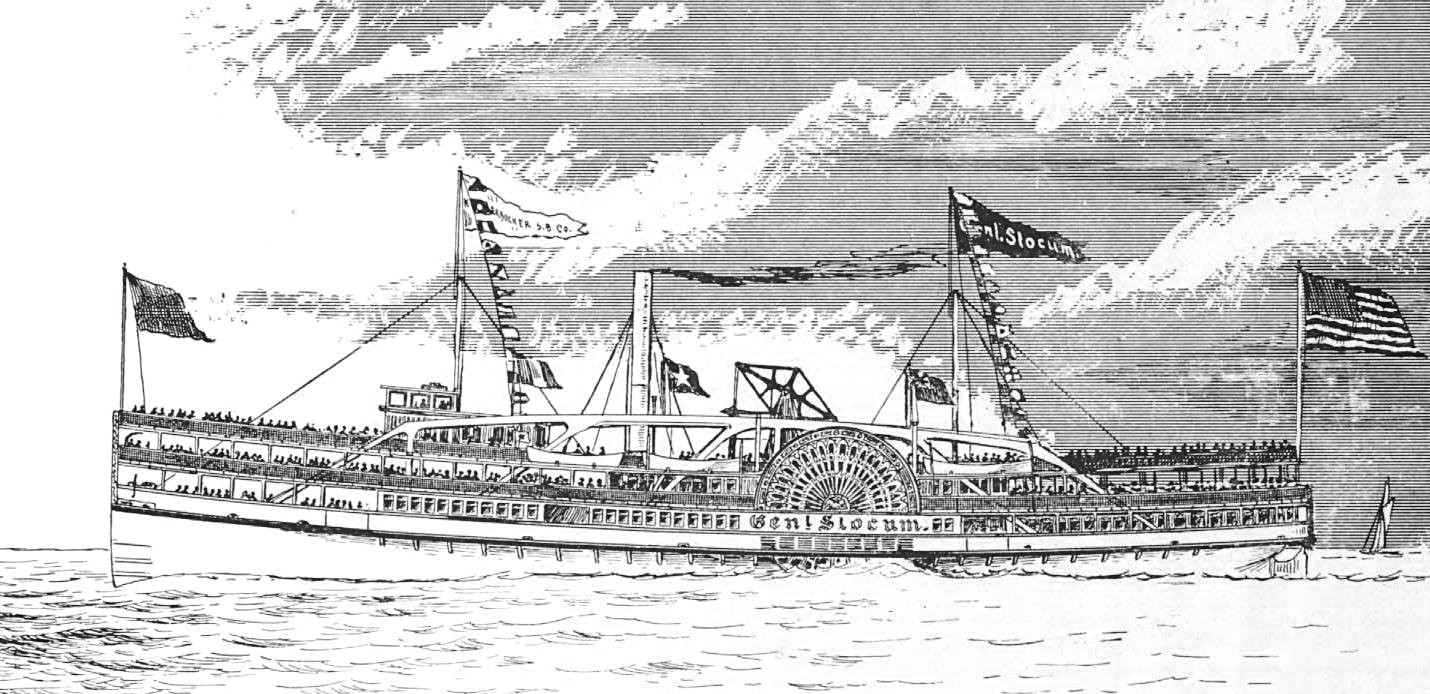
Drawing by Samuel Ward Stanton

The hull of General Slocum was built by Divine Burtis Jr., a Brooklyn boatbuilder who was awarded the contract on February 15, 1891; the superstructure was built by John E. Hoffmire & Son. Her keel was 235 feet (72 m) long and the hull was 37.5 feet (11.4 m) wide constructed of white oak and yellow pine. General Slocum measured 1,284 tons gross, and had a hull depth of 12.3 feet (3.7 m). She was constructed with three decks (main, promenade and hurricane), three watertight compartments and 250 electric lights. She drew 7.5 ft (2.3 m) unladen and was 250 ft (76 m) long overall.

General Slocum was powered by a single-cylinder, surface-condensing vertical-beam steam engine with a 53 inches (1.3 m) bore and 12 foot (3.7 m) stroke, built by W. & A. Fletcher Company of Hoboken, New Jersey. Steam was supplied by two boilers at a working pressure of 52 pounds per square inch (360 kPa). General Slocum was a sidewheel boat. Each wheel had 26 paddles and was 31 feet (9.4 m) in diameter. Her maximum speed was about 16 knots (30 km/h). The ship was usually crewed by a contingent of 22, including Captain William H. Van Schaick and two pilots. She had a legal capacity of 2,500 passengers.

Cabins, storeroom, and machinery spaces were below the main deck. Crew quarters were the second compartment aft from the bow, with a hatch and ladder leading to the main deck. Aft of the quarters was the "forward cabin", also fitted with a companionway to the main deck; it was originally intended to be a cabin space, but had been used as a storeroom and lamp room. The forward cabin also housed the ship's steering engine and dynamo. The forward cabin, measuring approximately 30 ft × 28 ft (9.1 m × 8.5 m) (length × width), was used for general storage and to store and refuel the ship's lamps from oil barrels kept there. Oil had been spilled on the deck of the Lamp Room numerous times, and it was frequented by crew who habitually used open flames in the room. Aft of the forward cabin was the machinery space for engines and boilers. The stern compartment below the main deck (aft of the machinery) was used as an aftersaloon.

The forward section of the main deck was enclosed just in front of the companionway leading to the forward cabin. The promenade deck, located above the main deck, was open except for a small section amidships. The hurricane deck, situated above the promenade, was where the lifeboats and life rafts were stored. The pilot house was positioned above the hurricane deck, with a small stateroom immediately behind it.

== Service history ==
General Slocum was named for Civil War General and New York Congressman Henry Warner Slocum. She was owned by the Knickerbocker Steamboat Company. She operated in the New York City area as an excursion steamer for the next 13 years under the same ownership.

General Slocum experienced a series of mishaps following her launch in 1891. Four months after her launching, she ran aground off Rockaway. Tugboats had to pull her free.

A number of incidents occurred during 1894. On July 29, while returning from Rockaway with about 4,700 passengers, General Slocum struck a sandbar with enough force to knock out her electrical generator. The next month, General Slocum ran aground off Coney Island during a storm. Passengers had to be transferred to another ship. In September 1894, General Slocum collided with the tug R. T. Sayre in the East River, causing substantial damage to General Slocum's steering.

In July 1898, General Slocum collided with the Amelia near Battery Park. On August 17, 1901, while carrying what was described as 900 intoxicated anarchists from Paterson, New Jersey, some of the passengers started a riot on board and tried to take control of the vessel. The crew fought back and kept control of the ship. The captain docked the ship at the police pier, and police took 17 men into custody.

In June 1902, General Slocum ran aground with 400 passengers aboard. Passengers had to camp out overnight while the ship remained stuck.

=== 1904 disaster ===
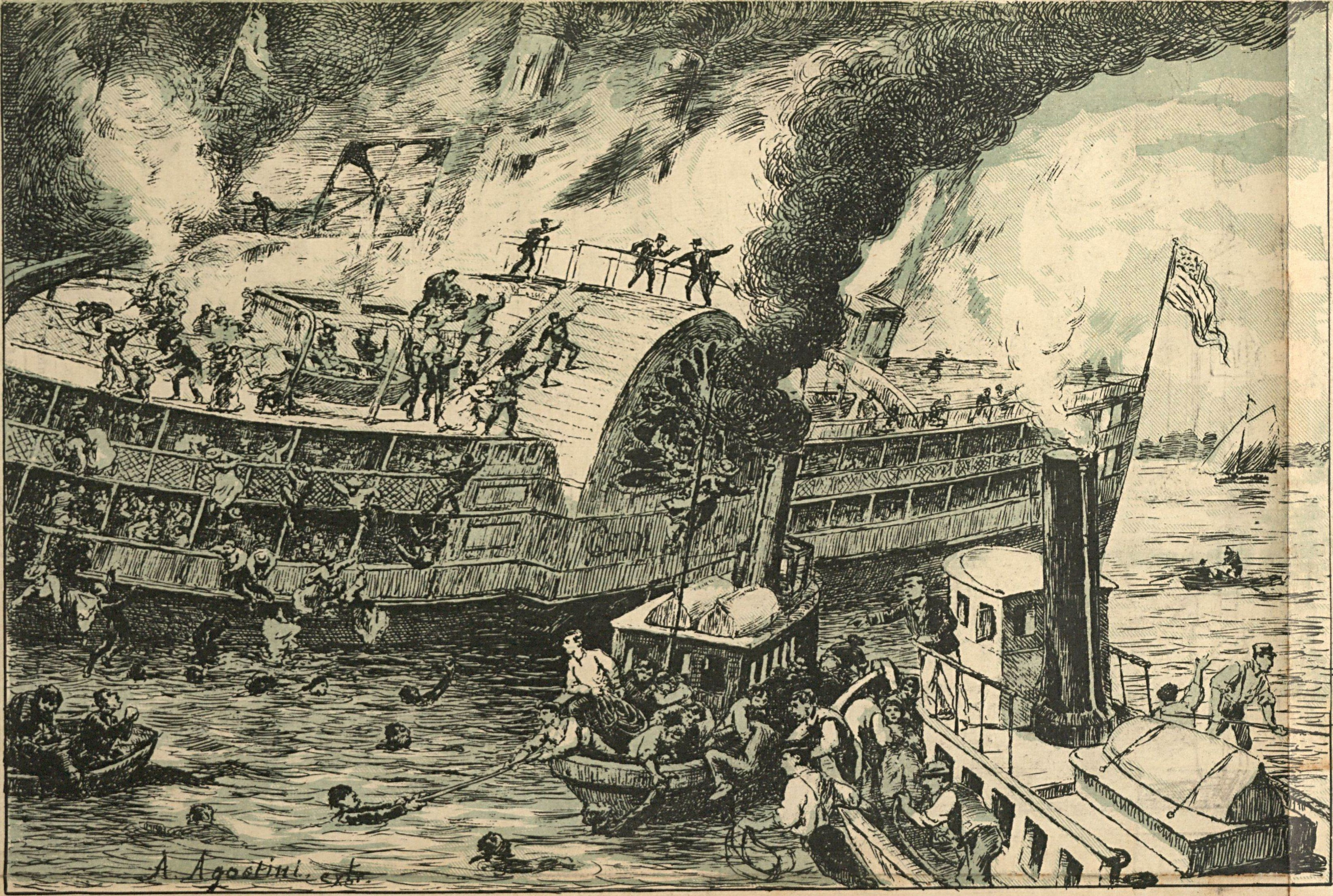
The great catastrophe of the passenger steamboat General Slocum (Angelo Agostini, O Malho, 1904)

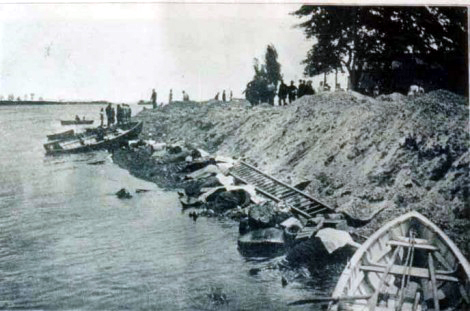
Victims of General Slocum washed ashore at North Brother Island

On Wednesday, June 15, 1904, the ship had been chartered for $350 by St. Mark's Evangelical Lutheran Church in the Little Germany district of Manhattan. This was an annual rite for the group, which had made the trip for 17 consecutive years. Nearly 1,400 passengers, mostly women and children, boarded General Slocum, which was to sail up the East River and then eastward across the Long Island Sound to Locust Grove, a picnic site in Eatons Neck, Long Island. Under the command of Captain William van Schaick, the ship got under way from the recreation pier at Third Street on the East River at 9:30 am; it passed west of Blackwell Island (now Roosevelt Island) and turned east, remaining south of Wards Island.

As it was passing East 90th Street, a fire started in the forward cabin or Lamp Room, the third compartment aft from the bow under the main deck; the fire was possibly caused by a discarded cigarette or match. The disastrous fire was fueled by the straw, oily rags, and lamp oil strewn around the room. The first notice of a fire was at 10 a.m.; eyewitnesses claimed the initial blaze began in various locations, including a paint locker filled with flammable liquids and a cabin filled with gasoline. Passengers on the main deck were aware of the fire at the entrance to Hell Gate.

Captain Van Schaick was not notified until 10 minutes after the fire was discovered. A 12-year-old boy had tried to warn him earlier, but was not believed. After he was notified of the fire, Van Schaick ordered full speed ahead; approximately 30 seconds later, he directed the pilot to beach the ship on North Brother Island. Following this last command, Van Schaick descended to the hurricane deck and remained there until he was able to jump into shallow water after the ship was beached.

The owners had made no effort to maintain or replace the ship's safety equipment. The main deck was equipped with a standpipe connected to a steam pump, but the fire hose attached to the forward end of the standpipe, a 100 ft (30 m) length of "cheap unlined linen," had been allowed to rot and burst in several places. The lifebelts reportedly fell apart in the hands of passengers and many drowned despite wearing them.

Captain Van Schaick decided to continue his course rather than run the ship aground or stop at a nearby landing, later arguing he was trying to avoid having the fire spread to riverside buildings and oil tanks. Flammable paint also helped the fire spread out of control, driven aft mainly along the port side of the ship; passengers, who were on the upper promenade and hurricane decks, were forced into the aft starboard quarter. Eventually, the ship was beached on North Brother Island.

Ten minutes after the ship was beached, the fire had essentially engulfed the vessel; no more than twenty minutes had elapsed since the first flames came up from the Lamp Room. Some passengers jumped into the river to escape the fire, but the heavy women's clothing of the day made swimming almost impossible and dragged them under water to drown. An estimated 100 to 500 died when the overloaded starboard section of the hurricane deck collapsed, casting those passengers into deep water, and others were battered by the still-turning paddles as they tried to escape into the water or over the sides.

General Slocum remained beached for approximately 90 minutes before breaking free and drifting east for approximately 1 mi (1.6 km); by the time she sank in shallow water off the Bronx shore at Hunts Point, an estimated 1,021 people, including 2 of the 30 crew members, had either burned to death or drowned. There were 431 survivors. The actions of two tugboats which arrived a few minutes after the Slocum was beached were credited with saving between 200 and 350 people.

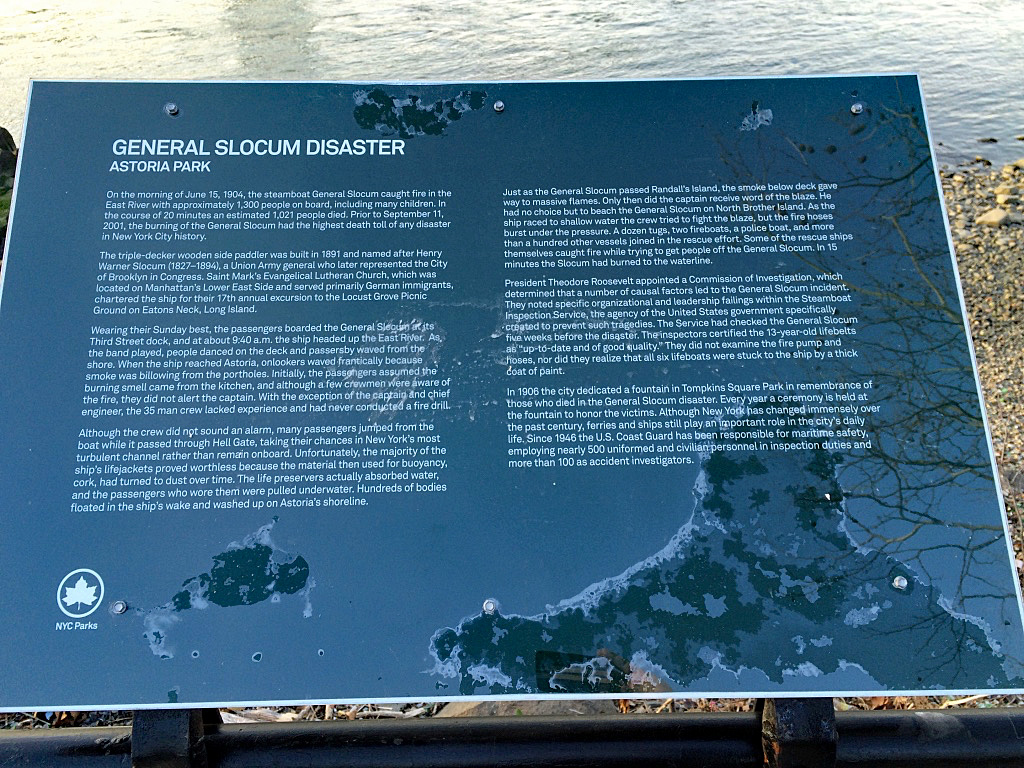
Historical marker in Astoria Park, Queens, overlooking the Hell Gate section of the East River, past where the burning ship began to sink

Eight people were indicted by a federal grand jury after the disaster: the captain, two inspectors, and the president, secretary, treasurer, and commodore of the Knickerbocker Steamship Company. Most boatmen felt that Van Schaick "was unjustly made a scapegoat for the resulting tragedy, instead of the owners of the steamer or the effectiveness of the life saving and fire fighting equipment then required — and the inspections of it by government inspectors". He was the only person convicted, being found guilty of criminal negligence for which he was sentenced to 10 years imprisonment. After his death in 1927, Schaick was buried in Oakwood Cemetery (Troy, New York).

The Knickerbocker Steamship Company, which owned the ship, paid a relatively small fine despite evidence that they might have falsified inspection records. The disaster motivated federal and state regulation to improve the emergency equipment on passenger ships.

The official post-disaster report by the Steamboat Inspection Service stated there were 1,358 passengers and 30 officers and crew; fewer than 150 of the passengers were estimated to be adult males over 21. Of those on board, there were 957 deaths and 180 injuries. Less than twenty minutes elapsed between the start of the fire and the collapse of the hurricane deck.

=== Post-fire career as the Maryland ===
The sunken remains of General Slocum were salvaged and converted into a 625-gross register ton barge named Maryland, which sank in the South River in 1909 and again in the Atlantic Ocean off the southeast coast of New Jersey near Strathmere and Sea Isle City during a storm on December 4, 1911, while carrying a cargo of coal. All four people aboard Maryland survived the sinking.

== Commemorations ==
In 1906, a marble memorial fountain was erected in the north central part of Tompkins Square Park in Manhattan by the Sympathy Society of German Ladies, with the inscription: "They are Earth's purest children, young and fair."

== See also ==
- List of disasters in New York City by death toll
- List of historic fires
- List of maritime disasters in the 20th century
- Sultana disaster, 19th-century disaster in the United States
