= Eunuchs in popular culture =

Depictions and conceptions of eunuchs

Eunuchs have appeared in many films, works of literature, and in popular culture.

== Anime and manga ==
- In the Japanese anime Code Geass: Lelouch of the Rebellion (R2), the de facto rulers of the oligarchic Chinese Federation comprise a group of eight eunuchs called "High Eunuchs".
- In the manga Red River, one of the main villains, Urhi, is a eunuch.
- Eunuchs feature prominently in the anime Raven of the Inner Palace, which takes place in a fictionalized version of ancient China.
- In the manga and anime The Apothecary Diaries, Jinshi, and several side characters are eunuchs.
- In Fullmetal Alchemist (2003), Scar’s brother can be seen leaving his hut after the failed transmutation of his lover that created Lust with notable bleeding on the groin area of his pants, suggesting he traded his genitals for the act.

== Comics ==
- The titular character of That Yellow Bastard (February–July 1996), a limited comic book series, the sixth in Dark Horse Comics' Sin City series, is a eunuch. (The series was adapted as a film, titled Sin City (2005), also known as Frank Miller's Sin City.)

== Films ==
- Eunuchs appear often as villains in Hong Kong kung fu and wuxia films set in ancient China. For example, the films Dragon Inn (Xin long men ke zhan), Butterfly and Sword (Xin liu xing hu die jian), and A Touch of Zen (Hsia nu) all feature a eunuch or a group of eunuchs as the main villain. A popular eunuch villain used in ancient China stories is Eunuch Wei, who is based on a historical figure named Wei Zhongxian. Eunuch villains are usually in charge of powerful political posts, such as being the leader of the East Chamber.
- In Mel Brooks's comedy History of the World, Part I (1981), under the section of "The Roman Empire", an entire scene is devoted to a joke about eunuchs, the length of African genitals, and the song, "Caldonia"; all rolled into one.
- Secret Service of the Imperial Court (1984), also called Police Pool of Blood, features a cruel eunuch named Wang.
- The Last Emperor (1987), Bernardo Bertolucci.
- In the Disney animated film Mulan (1998), the character Chi-Fu is a royal advisor that has been attached to Captain Li Shang's forces. Due to his effeminate demeanor, role as the royal advisor to the Emperor of China and the historical nature of the film, he would be assumed to be a eunuch.
- The Last Eunuch (1988), a Chinese biographical film directed by Zhang Zhiliang, tells the story of Sun Yaoting, who saw the last royal palace's extravagant lifestyle and experienced the breakdown of the last imperial empire and felt the new changes brought by the new age.
- In Terry Gilliam's The Adventures of Baron Munchausen (1988), the Grand Turk attempts to entertain the Baron playing his musical torture device and singing "The Torturer's Apprentice" before the eunuchs of his harem join to give a choral performance called "A Eunuch's Life is Hard".
- The film Farinelli (1994) is about the castrato singer Farinelli.
- The documentary film Bombay Eunuch (2001) examines the changing role of India's hijras, some of whom are also eunuchs.
- The documentary film American Eunuchs (2003) investigates the underworld of modern eunuchs in America.
- In the film One Night With the King (2006), Hadassah's (Esther's) would-be boyfriend, Jesse, is captured by the Persian empire and castrated.
- The documentary film Kiss the Moon (2010), set in Pakistan, portrays three generations of eunuchs examining the ancient rituals and religious beliefs surrounding their community.
- Nilkantho treats the plight of the Indian hijras with sensitivity.
- In Murder 2 (2011), by Emraan Hashmi, the antagonist castrates himself and becomes a eunuch.
- The Eunuch and the Flute Player (2017), directed by Kaushik Ganguly

== Games ==
- In the video game The Witcher 3: Wild Hunt (2015), the loyal servant and bookie of head Redanian Intelligence Sigismund Dijkstra is a eunuch, called Happen the Eunuch. He takes care of the Bathhouse in Novigrad, which is open to both sexes.

== Literature ==
=== Pre-19th century ===
- Eunuchus (The Eunuch) is a comedy by the Roman playwright Terence.
- Several tales of the Arabian Nights focus on eunuchs.
- The character of the Pardoner in Geoffrey Chaucer's The Canterbury Tales (late 14th century), is implied to be a eunuch or homosexual.
- In William Shakespeare's play Twelfth Night (c. 1601), Viola initially decides to disguise herself as a eunuch named Cesario in order to serve Duke Orsino.
- In The Country Wife (1675) by William Wycherley, the main character, Mr. Horner, pretends to be a man turned eunuch by impotence caused by syphilis, in order to gain access to the bedrooms of married women.
- Eunuchs feature prominently in Montesquieu's novel Lettres Persanes (1722) about Persian visitors to 18th-century France.
- One of the characters that Voltaire's Candide (1759) meets on his adventures is a eunuch.
- In Tristram Shandy (1759) by Laurence Sterne, Tristram has an accident with a window and Uncle Toby has a war injury.
- Vathek by William Beckford — alternatively titled Vathek, an Arabian Tale or The History of the Caliph Vathek — was written in 1782 in French but first published in English with a translation by Reverend Samuel Henley (1786). The first French edition, Vathek, was published in 1786. The character of Vathek is a caliph who has a retinue of eunuchs.

=== 19th century ===
- Don Juan (1819–1824) by Lord Byron, in Cantos V and VI, has a eunuch from the Sultan's harem. The eunuch buys Juan, a non-Muslim, as a slave, brings him to the sultan's palace in Constantinople, and threatens to castrate him if he does not put on a dress. Juan is presented to the sultan as Juanna and spends the night in the women's quarters.
- The Temptation of Saint Anthony (1874) by Gustave Flaubert is set during one night in the late 3rd or early 4th century in the Egyptian desert. The character Montanus is a eunuch.

=== 20th century ===
- The Daughter of Heaven, originally published as La Fille du Ciel (1911) by Pierre Loti and Judith Gautier, translated by Ruth Helen Davis (1913)
- In Robert E. Howard's short story "The Scarlet Citadel" (1933), the main antagonist has a eunuch prison guard named Shukeli, in whom normal human passions have been replaced by extreme sadism.
- In Constant Lambert's Music Ho! A Study of Music in Decline, the title alludes to a short passage in Shakespeare's Antony and Cleopatra: ALL: The music, ho! Enter Mardian the Eunuch. CLEOPATRA: Let it alone; let's to billiards.
- The eunuch Manan is a major character in The Tombs of Atuan (1971), the second book from Ursula K. Le Guin's Earthsea series. The story largely takes place in a large convent where no men are allowed, so a number of other eunuchs are mentioned. One among them is Duby, who Manan plays a stick game with.
- Bagoas, the eunuch favorite of Alexander the Great's, is the main character and narrator of The Persian Boy (1972), an historical novel by Mary Renault.
- The Alteration (1976) by Kingsley Amis is an "alternative history" set in 20th-century England about a boy soprano and eunuch.
- Suttree (1979) by Cormac McCarthy has a eunuch named Thersites who yells at passersby from his window in McAnally Flats.
- Castrati singers in 18th-century Italy are the main characters of Anne Rice's novel Cry to Heaven (1982).
- The Queen Salmissra, in David Eddings' series The Belgariad (1982–1984) and The Malloreon (1987–1991), is only allowed to be served by eunuchs. Her chief eunuch, Sadi, becomes a principal character in The Malloreon, and is referred to in The Prophecy as "The Man who is no Man."
- For the greater part of Iain Banks' novel The Wasp Factory (1984), the 16-year-old narrator Frank Cauldhame claims to be a eunuch, the result of being savaged by a dog when he was an infant. At the novel's climax, Frank discovers that he was, in fact, born female.
- The society described in Rieko Yoshihara's Japanese novel (and later anime series) Ai no Kusabi (1987) has within its caste system "Furniture", or eunuchs who act as servants to the highest social class. The character Katze was once Furniture but now works on the black market.
- Wilbur Smith's Egyptian series of novels about ancient Egypt, beginning with River God (1991), follow the adventures of a talented eunuch named Taita.
- Departures (1993) by Harry Turtledove is a story collection. The story "Counting Potsherds", originally published in Amazing Stories (March 1989), has a eunuch named Mithredath.
- Domino (1995) by Ross King is about an Italian castrato singer.
- The Eunuch: A Dark Tale (1995) by Richard Bird.
- The Last Castrato (1996) by John Spencer Hill is the first book in the Mystery of Florence series.
- The Rose Crossing (1996) by Nicholas Jose is set on the Indian Ocean in the 17th century. It has a eunuch character, Lou Lo.
- In The Plotters (1996) by Gareth Roberts, Robert Hay's eunuchs attacked Vicki Pallister to get information about the First Doctor Who.
- Last Evenings on Earth (Llamadas Telefonicas in Spanish) was published in 1997. It's a collection of short stories by Chilean author Roberto Bolaño. It was translated by Chris Andrews in 2006. The short story "Mauricio ('The Eye') Silva" is about a man who rescues a castrated boy from a brothel in India.

=== 21st century ===
- John, the Lord Chamberlain Mystery is a historical mystery series. It's sometimes called John the Eunuch. The authors are Mary Reed and Eric Mayer. The first book, One for Sorrow, was published in 1999. The novels detail investigations carried out by John, the eunuch Lord Chamberlain to Emperor Justinian I, in and around the sixth-century imperial court in Constantinople.
- In The Slow Empire (2001) by Dave Stone, a novel about the Eighth Doctor Who, Fitz Kreiner had to watch over a woman, and the Emperor wanted to castrate him.
- Christopher Harris' historical novel Memoirs of a Byzantine Eunuch (2002) features a eunuch.
- Kim Stanley Robinson's historical science fiction novel The Years of Rice and Salt (2002) features many eunuchs in its opening section, including the character Kyu and the historical Chinese admiral Zheng He.
- The Castration (2002) by William A. Carey and St. John Barrett is about a man who is attacked and castrated during a robbery in the United States.
- The Eunuch Neferu (2004) by Daniel Tegan Marsche. A fourth edition was released in 2014.
- The Vampire Eli in John Ajvide Lindqvist's novel Let The Right One In (2004) is a eunuch. However, this detail is not made abundantly clear in the book's eponymous 2008 film adaptation.
- Sazed, a major character in Brandon Sanderson's Mistborn trilogy, was made a eunuch at a young age to prevent his magical abilities being inherited. He eventually ascends to godhood, becoming an entity called Harmony. The first book was published in 2006.
- Three best-selling crime novels by Jason Goodwin, The Janissary Tree (2006) and its sequels, The Snake Stone and The Bellini Card, are set in Istanbul in the 1830s, chronicle the investigations of Yashim Togalu, a Turkish eunuch detective to the Sultan's royal court, in the Ottoman Empire of the 1830s.
- Dan Brown's thriller The Lost Symbol's (2009) main antagonist Mal'akh (real name Zachary Solomon) is revealed to have castrated himself, among other body modifications.
- George R. R. Martin's fantasy series A Song of Ice and Fire and its TV adaptation, Game of Thrones, features numerous eunuchs, including: the eunuch Varys (also called the Spider), a court official bearing the title of Master of Whisperers, the equivalent of the real world spymaster; Theon Greyjoy, who is implied to have been castrated while held prisoner; and the Unsullied, elite eunuch soldiers, who are also prominently featured in the books.
- Sultana: The Pomegranate Tree (2015) by Lisa J. Yarde is set in Moorish Spain. It's the fifth book in the Sultana series. There is a eunuch named Fatou.
- The Sky Worshipers (2021) by F.M. Deemyad portrays Princess Chaka, betrothed to Genghis Khan, who is helped by an African eunuch named Baako.
- The Rebel Nun (2021) by Marj Charlier mentions a eunuch character.
- She Who Became the Sun by Shelley Parker-Chan features a eunuch (General Ouyang) as one of the main characters.

== Music ==
- The punk rock band the Descendents wrote a song about a eunuch called "Eunuch Boy", which was on their 1996 comeback album Everything Sucks.

== Television ==
- In the TV show Major Dad, a eunuch was in charge of the security wives of Emir of Katodd.
- In the Red Dwarf episode "Marooned", Rimmer is said to have been Alexander the Great's chief eunuch in a past life.
- The character Naboo the Enigma, from the British comedy act and television series The Mighty Boosh, is a eunuch.
- In the HBO show Game of Thrones supporting character Varys is a eunuch, as are Theon Greyjoy and the elite warriors of the Unsullied.
- In the British Television programme "Peep Show", Mark is described as a eunuch by Big Suze in the episode "Sisterning",
- In the South Korean drama Love in the Moonlight, one of the main characters is a girl who's disguised as a eunuch.
- In the Turkish historical drama The Magnificent Century several eunuchs serve in the Suleiman the Magnificent's harem. For example: Gazanfer Agha and Sümbül Agha; In the spin-off The Magnificent Century: Kösem, other real-life eunuchs are introduced such as Hacı Mustafa Agha or Süleyman Agha, responsible for the assassination of Kösem Sultan.
- In the British TV comedy Blackadder, (Series 1, episode 2, "Born to be King"), set In the 15th century, the character 'McAngus' mistakes Blackadder, Duke of Edinburgh, as a eunuch, due to his strange appearance and high-pitched voice; ("I am NOT a eunuch", Blackadder tells McAngus, who replies "Well, you sound like one to me!"). In the same episode, Blackadder has a conversation with his brother, Harry prince of Wales, who insists that eunuchs are an essential part of any celebration.
- The Chinese television series Empresses in the Palace (2011) has several eunuch characters.
- In the Cinemax series Banshee the character Clayton Burton is a Eunuch.
