= Lai Shi, China's Last Eunuch =

1988 Hong Kong film by Jacob Cheung

- Film poster

Chinese name
- Traditional Chinese: 中國最後一個太監
- Simplified Chinese: 中国最后一个太监
Transcriptions
Standard Mandarin
- Hanyu Pinyin: Zhōngguó Zuìhòu Yīge Tàijiān
Yue: Cantonese
- Jyutping: Zung1 Gwok3 Zeoi3 Hau6 Jat1 Go3 Taai3 Gaam3
- Directed by: Jacob Cheung
- Screenplay by: Eddie Fong
- Story by: Ni Kuang; Jacon Cheung; Eddie Fong; Chan Wai
- Produced by: Sammo Hung
- Starring: Max Mok; Irene Wan; Sammo Hung; Andy Lau; Wu Ma; Lam Ching-ying
- Cinematography: Tom Lau
- Edited by: Peter Cheung
- Music by: Joseph Chan; Sherman Chow
- Production companies: Bo Ho Films; Paragon Films
- Distributed by: Golden Harvest
- Release date: 4 March 1988
- Running time: 90 minutes
- Country: Hong Kong
- Language: Cantonese
- Box office: HK$15,624,171

Lai Shi, China's Last Eunuch, also known as Last Eunuch in China (Chinese: 中國最後一個太監) is a 1988 Hong Kong historical drama film directed by Jacob Cheung in his directorial debut and starring Max Mok in the title role of Liu Lai-shi. The film is based on Ni Kuang's novel about eunuch Sun Yaoting.

== Plot ==
During the chaos of the late Qing Dynasty, Liu Lai-shi (Max Mok) envies the glory of his fellow townsman and eunuch Siu-tak-cheung and asks his parents for purification. Soon, the Qing dynasty collapses, Liu failed to become an imperial eunuch and was sent to Beijing to study opera. Subsequently, he meets his childhood friend Chiu Tai (Irene Wan). Liu intends to lead a normal family life, but unable to do so after his identity of a eunuch was exposed. The opera troupe leader (Sammo Hung) sympathizes Liu's life experiences and tried to arrange him to the palace to be China's last eunuch. In 1924, Xuantong Emperor was expelled from the Forbidden City and Liu also began his wandering career.

== Cast ==
- Max Mok as Liu Lai-shi, the main protagonist, China's last eunuch
- Irene Wan as Chiu Tai, Liu Lai-shi's childhood friend
- Sammo Hung as Liu Lai-shi's teacher, the opera troupe leader
- Andy Lau as Han Ming, Chiu Tai's husband and a revolutionary
- Wu Ma as Lord Ting, the head eunuch
- Lam Ching-ying as Liu Chang-fu, Liu Lai-shi's father
- Gua Ah-leh as Liu Lai-shi's mother
- Pauline Wong as Sister Hung, a prostitute
- Manfred Wong as Eunuch Lee
- Peter Mak
- Alfred Cheung as the district chief
- Anthony Chan as a Japanese interpreter
- James Tien as General Lei
- Sit Hon as Lord Chao
- Sihung Lung as Fu's landlord
- Ng Min-kan, Yuen Miu, Chow Kam-kong and Pang Yun-cheung as opera troupe members
- Lee Chi-kit as a Japanese soldier
- Vincent Chiao as Adjutant

== Theme song ==
- Misconception (錯覺)
  - Composer: Joseph Koo
  - Lyricist: Cheng Kwok-kong
  - Singer: Andy Lau

== Box office ==
The film grossed HK$15,624,171 at the Hong Kong box office during its theatrical run from 4 March to 31 March 1988 in Hong Kong.

== Accolades ==
Accolades
Ceremony	Category	Recipient	Outcome
8th Hong Kong Film Awards	Best Director	Jacob Cheung	Nominated
8th Hong Kong Film Awards	Best Actor	Max Mok	Nominated
8th Hong Kong Film Awards	Best Supporting Actor	Wu Ma	Nominated
24th Golden Horse Awards	Best Actor	Max Mok	Nominated
