= Yinghua =

Yinghua may refer to:

- Cherry blossom for Chinese
- Yinghua (蓥华镇), Shifang, Deyang, Sichuan, China
- Yinghua Township (英华乡), Zhenlai County, Baicheng, Jilin province, China
- YingHua International School, Princeton, New Jersey

== Names ==
- Cheng Yinghua (born 1958), a Chinese table tennis player
- He Yinghua (何映华; born 1949), member of the Agriculture and Rural Affairs Committee of the National People's Congress
- Isabel Yinghua Hernandez Santos, (born 1995), a Spanish Paralympic swimmer
- Jia Yinghua (born 1952), a Chinese writer and researcher
- Tie Yinghua (born 1993), a Chinese kickboxer
- Wu Yinghua (1907–1996), a famous Chinese teacher of Wu-style tai chi
- Carol Yinghua Lu (born 1977), a curator, art critic and writer
- Ivana Lie (李英華; pinyin: Lǐ yīnghuá; born 1960), an Indonesian former badminton player
- Michael Chow (周英華; pinyin: Zhōu Yīnghuá; born 1939), a British Chinese restaurateur, interior designer, artist and actor

== See also ==
- Wenxin Yinghua metro station, a metro station of the Taichung Metro
- Wenyuan Yinghua, an anthology of poetry, odes, songs and writings from the Liang dynasty to the Five Dynasties era
- Sakura Park Station
