= Sun Yaoting =

Last imperial eunuch of China

- Born: 29 September 1903; Tianjin, Jinghai County, Qing Empire
- Died: 17 December 1996 (aged 93); Beijing, China
- Occupation: Imperial court eunuch
- Known for: Being the last surviving eunuch of Imperial China

Sun Yaoting (simplified Chinese: 孙耀庭; traditional Chinese: 孫耀庭; pinyin: Sūn Yàotíng, 29 September 1903 – 17 December 1996) was the last surviving imperial eunuch in Imperial Chinese history.

== Life ==
Sun Yaoting was born in a village near Tianjin, about 60 miles southeast of Beijing. Born into poverty, his father was a jianbing peddler. When he was young, his family's home was burned down and their fields were stolen by a landlord in their village. Inspired by an older eunuch from his village who had become rich, coupled with the family's hope that they would gain Imperial influence and get revenge on the landlord, the family decided to emasculate Sun. In 1911, at the age of eight, Sun was emasculated by his father at home on their bed with a single razor cut, without the use of anesthesia. A piece of oil-soaked paper was used as a bandage, while a goose quill was inserted in Sun's urethra to prevent it from getting blocked as the wound healed. Sun remained unconscious for three days and could barely move for two months.

However, the emperor he had hoped to serve, Puyi, had abdicated several weeks before his recovery during the Xinhai Revolution.

Nonetheless, Sun went to Beijing at age 14. His rank initially was so low that he was not even given a name, and worked as a servant to another, higher ranking eunuch. He then rose through the ranks, becoming a palace eunuch serving under one of the emperor’s uncles, eventually becoming an attendant to the Qing empress.

Corruption amongst the eunuchs working in the Forbidden City was rampant, as they constantly stole treasures and sold it on the black market. According to the Qing Emperor Puyi, several locks were broken, nearby areas were ransacked, and the pearls and jade in the empress's crown were stolen by the end of his wedding ceremony. As part of an effort to crack down on this corruption, Puyi took inspiration from his tutor and close advisor, Reginald Johnston, and ordered an inventory of the Forbidden City's treasures. The Hall of Established Happiness was burned on the night of 26 June 1923, just when the emperor had ordered to carry out the inventory of one of the imperial warehouses. Puyi suspected it was arson to cover theft. Coupled with the fact that he had overheard conversations amongst the eunuchs that made him fear for his life, he evicted all but 50 to 100 eunuchs from the palace with the support of the Beiyang Army a month after the fire.

Accounts regarding Sun's life henceforth differ. Some sources claim he remained an attendant to the Qing empress until the expulsion of the imperial family from the Forbidden City in 1924. He then followed them north and continued to serve in Manchukuo until the puppet state's collapse at the end of World War II, After which he became a caretaker of the Guanghua temple in Beijing, where he lived until his death, using the fact that he was one of the few eunuchs who were literate.

Other sources state that the incident at The Hall of Established Happiness cut short Sun's career and forced him to leave. He then moved to the Hebei province in North China, where he became a target of public scorn for being a remnant of the "old society", a belief that would only take further hold in China during The Cultural Revolution. He lived there in poverty for a few years before eventually becoming a monk. He finally moved back to Beijing after an unspecified amount of time and spent the remaining years of his life there, ostensibly as a caretaker of the Guanghua temple.

Even with the faltering influence of the Qing Dynasty, Sun was nevertheless able to gain enough influence in the royal household to be privy to many of the court’s intimate secrets, such as the opium addiction and out-of-wedlock pregnancy of the Qing empress Wanrong, as well as reports that the emperor showed more interest in a eunuch than his wife.

His preserved genitals, referred to as "treasure" by eunuchs as a slang term as well as in a literal fashion given the practice of eunuchs being buried with them as "complete men", were discarded by his siblings during the Cultural Revolution due to fear of persecution, given its connotation to the "old society". The fact that he could not be buried with his preserved genitals as a "complete man" remained a major source of distress for Sun for the remainder of his life.

== Legacy ==
The Eunuch Culture Museum, located in the Shijingshan district of Beijing, is a museum dedicated to the history of eunuchs in China. It was established on the premises of the tomb of Tian Yi, a famous Ming eunuch who lived from 1534 to 1605. Items now on display mainly consist of articles left behind by Sun; such as his chair, walking stick, and a yellow jacket given to him by Puyi.

His biography, The Last Eunuch of China, written by Chinese writer Jia Yinghua, was published in 1998 and translated into English in 2008. Lai Shi, China's Last Eunuch is a 1988 Hong Kong historical drama directed by Jacob Cheung which is loosely based on Sun Yaoting's life, taking inspiration from his biography.

== Death ==
Sun likely spent the last few years of his life as a monk, before working as a caretaker of the Guanghua temple in Beijing. He lived there until his death on 17 December 1996 at the age of 93.
