= Jocasta Innes =

British writer and journalist (1934–2013)

- Jocasta Innes
- Born: 21 May 1934; Nanjing, China
- Died: 20 April 2013 (aged 78)
- Education: Girton College, Cambridge
- Occupations: Writer; Journalist; Businesswoman
- Spouse(s): Richard B. Goodwin (div. 1967) Joe Potts (div. 1979)
- Partner: Richard MacCormac (c. 1981)
- Children: 4, including Daisy and Jason

Jocasta Claire Traill Innes (21 May 1934 – 20 April 2013) was a British writer, journalist and businesswoman. She mainly wrote about cooking, crafts and homemaking, including in her books The Pauper's Homemaking Book (1976) and The Country Kitchen (1987), and worked for publications such as Cosmopolitan. She founded and was CEO of the paint company Paint Magic in the 1980s, inspired by her 1981 book Paint Magic. Two of her children, Daisy and Jason Goodwin, are also writers.

== Life ==
Innes was born in Nanjing, China, the eldest of three daughters born to Paul Joseph Anthony Innes, a Shell Oil executive, and Alice Eileen née Traill, an Irish-Argentinian teacher who ran a school for the children of other British-born residents. By the age of twelve she had lived on every continent in the world, except Antarctica. After a spell at a Coptic convent in Cairo, she was educated at Bedford High School from 1949 and Girton College, Cambridge, where she read Modern Languages.

One of her first jobs was with the Evening Standard’s Londoners Diary, where she was known for gatecrashing the debutante balls that were diary fodder at the time.

Her first book was the bestselling The Pauper's Cookbook (1971), born as she said "out of necessity" during an impecunious spell. A self-taught cook, who idolised Elizabeth David, she was determined to show that making great food does not depend on buying expensive ingredients or having special expertise. This was followed by The Pauper’s Homemaking Book in 1976 which took the same democratic approach to interiors and The Country Kitchen which dealt with old-fashioned rural British cookery and crafts – Damson Cheese, curing hams in saltpetre and parsnip wine.

In 1981 she published Paint Magic, which popularised the practices of stencilling, stippling and the pleasures of festoon blinds. It went on to sell over a million copies around the world. At a time when DIY meant rawlplugs and melamine kitchen units, Innes introduced middle England to a world of pelmets and passementerie. In 1983 she became the Design Editor of Cosmopolitan magazine. She established her own paint company, Paint Magic, which had several stores in the UK and abroad. The company, of which Innes was chief executive, pioneered innovative ready-made paint finishes for customers to try out at home as well as giving popular decorating classes. Paint Magic ceased trading after a decade.

Innes moved to Spitalfields in 1979, where she renovated a derelict house, and was a passionate campaigner for the regeneration of the area.

== Family life ==
Innes married twice. Her first marriage was to the film producer Richard B. Goodwin; their relationship ended in 1967. Goodwin and Innes had a daughter, Daisy, born in 1961. Innes was then married to the novelist Joe Potts until their relationship ended in 1979.

For the last thirty years her partner was the architect Sir Richard MacCormac, a former president of the Royal Institute of British Architects. The couple first met in 1981. Their graves are side by side in the churchyard of St Mary's, Laverton in Somerset. Innes was survived by MacCormac, who died in 2014, and her four children, Daisy Goodwin, Jason Goodwin, Tabitha and Chloe Potts, and nine grandchildren.
