= Jason Goodwin =

British historian (born 1964)

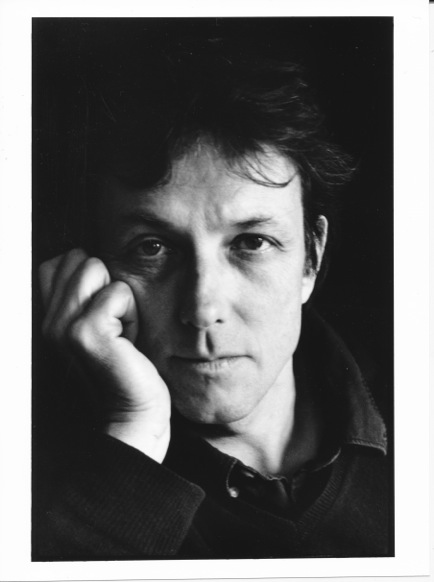
- Born: Jason Goodwin; June 1964 (age 62); England
- Education: Trinity College, Cambridge
- Occupations: Writer, historian
- Spouse: Kate Goodwin
- Children: 4
- Parent(s): Jocasta Innes (mother); John Michell (father); Richard B. Goodwin (stepfather)
- Relatives: Daisy Goodwin (half-sister)
- Writing career
- Language: English
- Genre: Thriller
- Notable work: The Janissary Tree
- Website: www.jasongoodwin.info

Jason Goodwin (born June 1964) is an English writer and historian.

== Biography ==
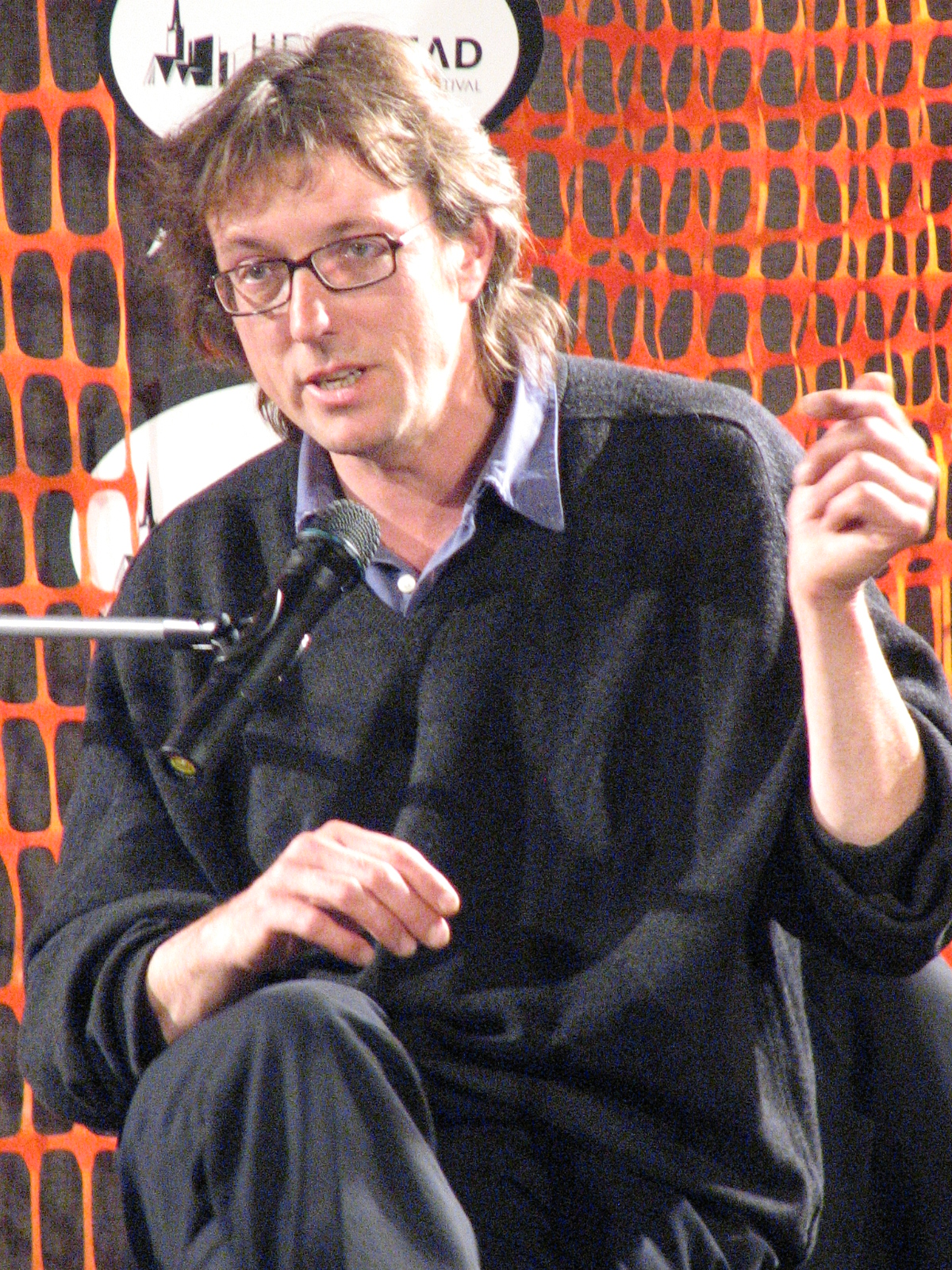
Jason Goodwin at HeadRead festival in Tallinn, 2011

Goodwin attended Sussex House School and Westminster School, before studying history at Trinity College, Cambridge. Following the success of The Gunpowder Gardens or, A Time For Tea: Travels in China and India in Search of Tea, he walked from Poland to Istanbul, Turkey. His account of the journey, On Foot to the Golden Horn, won the John Llewellyn Rhys/Mail on Sunday Prize in 1993.

Subsequently, he wrote Lords of the Horizons: A History of the Ottoman Empire, which was featured on the cover of The New York Times Book Review. Later, he became popular as the author of a series of historical mystery novels beginning with The Janissary Tree, which pivot on the Ottoman investigator Yashim, a eunuch living in Istanbul during the 1830s-1840s. The Janissary Tree won the Edgar Award for Best Novel in 2007 and novels in the series have been translated into over 40 languages.

The Snake Stone involves a French archaeologist and Byron's doctor. The Bellini Card takes the action to Venice, and involves Italian painter Gentile Bellini's portrait of Mehmed II. The fourth Yashim novel, An Evil Eye, centres on the Ottoman sultan's harem, and the final Istanbul adventure, The Baklava Club, involves Italian and Polish revolutionaries in Istanbul.

In 2016 Goodwin published a cookbook, Yashim Cooks Istanbul, based on the detective series, which was selected by NPR's Book Concierge as one of its Great Reads of the year. From January 2018 he has written the weekly Spectator column for Country Life magazine.

Goodwin is the son of writers Jocasta Innes and John Michell. However, his parents separated before he was born. Goodwin did not meet his birth father until 1992, at the age of 28, and was raised by his mother's first husband, the film producer Richard B. Goodwin. One of his four half-sisters is the British TV producer and novelist Daisy Goodwin. He is married and has four children.

== Published works ==
=== Non-fiction ===
- The Gunpowder Gardens: Travels Through India and China in Search of Tea (1990); published in the US as A Time For Tea: Travels in China and India in Search of Tea (1991)
- On Foot to the Golden Horn: A Walk to Istanbul (1993)
- Lords of the Horizons: A History of the Ottoman Empire (1998)
- Greenback: The Almighty Dollar and the Invention of America (2003)
- Yashim Cooks Istanbul: Culinary Adventures in the Ottoman Kitchen (2016)

=== Fiction ===
- Yashim the Eunuch Investigator novels:
  - The Janissary Tree (2006)
  - The Snake Stone (2007)
  - The Bellini Card (2008)
  - An Evil Eye (2011)
  - The Baklava Club (2014)

== Awards ==
- 1987 Spectator/Sunday Telegraph Young Writer of the Year (UK)
- 1991 Thomas Cook Travel Writing Award (UK) The Gunpowder Gardens shortlisted
- 1993 John Llewllyn Rhys Prize (UK) On Foot to the Golden Horn: A Walk to Istanbul
- 2007 Edgar Award for Best Novel (US) The Janissary Tree
- 2007 Macavity Award for Best Mystery Novel (US) The Janissary Tree shortlisted
- 2012 Library Dagger (UK) shortlist
