= The Extraordinary Life of the Last Emperor of China =

2012 book by Jia Yinghua

The Extraordinary Life of The Last Emperor of China
- First edition
- Author: Jia Yinghua
- Language: Chinese
- Genre: Biography
- Publisher: People's Literature Publishing House
- Publication date: 2012
- Publication place: China
- Media type: Print (Paperback)
- Pages: 449 pp
- ISBN: 9787020088607

The Extraordinary Life of The Last Emperor of China (Chinese: 末代皇帝的非常人生; pinyin: Mòdài Huángdì dè Fēicháng Rénshēng) is a Chinese historical biographical book by Jia Yinghua about the life of Puyi (1906–1967), the Last Emperor of China.

Jia had contact with Li Shuxian, Puyi's widow, for nearly 30 years, and was the first person to collect Puyi's writings and record Li's recollections of her husband. He even wrote the epigraph on Puyi's casket. Jia also interviewed over 300 people who had associations with Puyi since the late Qing dynasty, thus making the book's authenticity irreplaceable.

The book narrates Puyi's life from his entry into the Forbidden City at the age of three in 1908 to his death in 1967. It tries to avoid repeating the stories already mentioned in Puyi's autobiography From Emperor to Citizen, and instead focuses on disclosing untold stories of Puyi in a multi-layered fashion.

The book also contains historic documents of more than 300,000 Chinese characters related to Puyi's life. In addition to old photographs, Jia also publicised many cultural relics about Puyi for the first time in his book. The relics include: Puyi's abdication decree written in the Mongolian language and Chinese issued by the Colonial Affairs Department in 1911; the preferential conditions for the Qing imperial family; the Hongxian porcelain tray customised for Yuan Shikai; letters written by Puyi to farmers and the envelopes; multiple drafts of Puyi's autobiography From Emperor to Citizen; Puyi's original medical records; glasses and glass boxes used by Puyi; mirrors used by Puyi during the Cultural Revolution; notes taken by Jia during interviews.
