= Tian Yi =

Chinese eunuch (1534–1605)

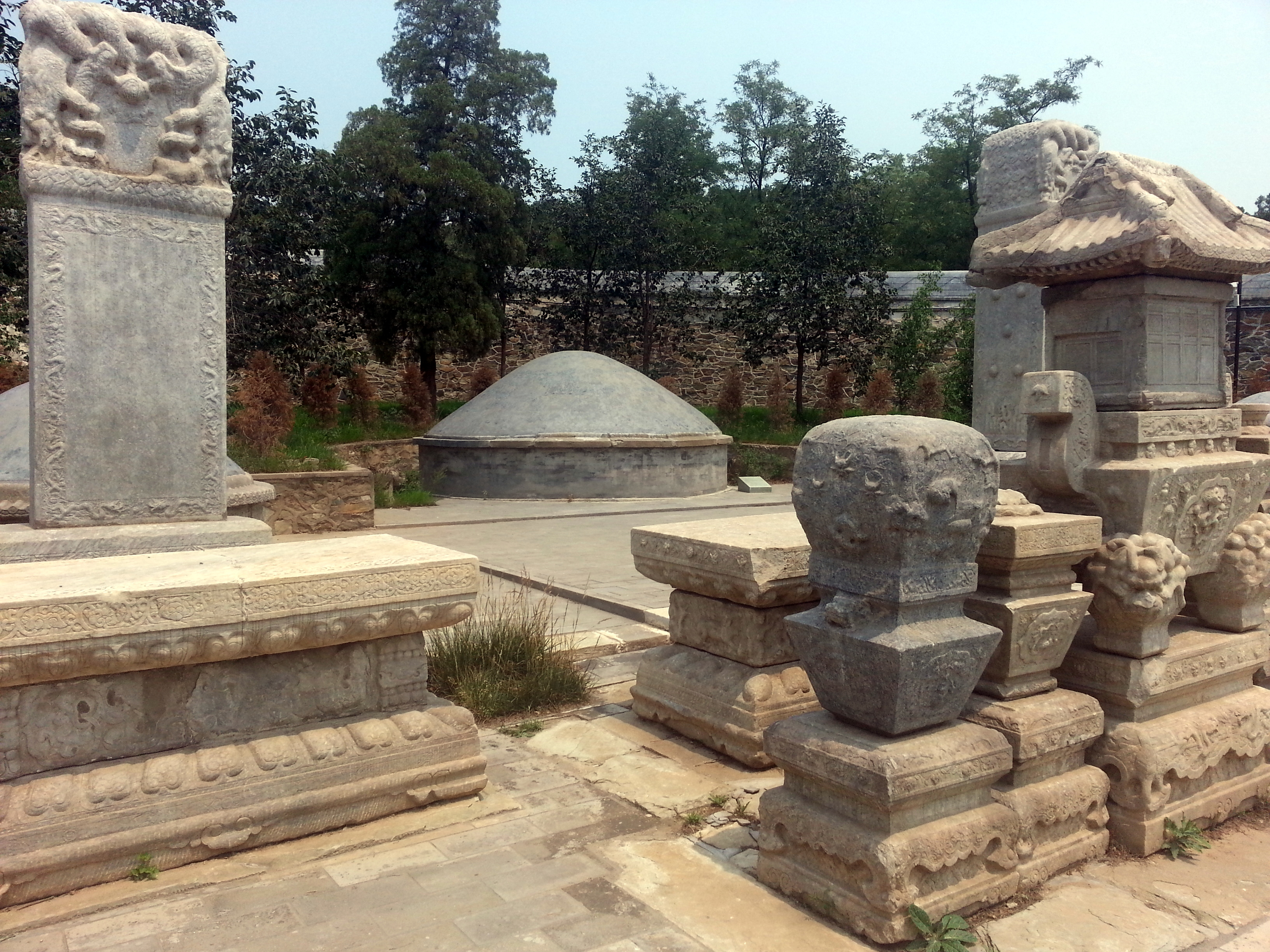
- Tian’s tomb in Shijingshan, Beijing
- Born: 1534; Shaanxi Province
- Died: 1605 (aged 72); Beijing
- Occupation: Imperial court eunuch
- Known for: respected for his character and ethics

Tian Yi (traditional Chinese: 田義; simplified Chinese: 田义; pinyin: Tián Yì, 1534 - 1605) was a eunuch serving at the imperial court of the Ming dynasty. He served under the Jiajing, the Longqing, and the Wanli emperors for a total of 63 years and eventually rose to a high position in the court, overseeing the Directorate of Ceremonial ("Master of the Seal in charge of rituals ) which ranked first among the twelve eunuch directorates. By the time of this death, he had become the favorite eunuch of the Wanli Emperor.

Tian Yi was born in Shaanxi Province and was castrated at age 9. He entered the imperial court immediately afterwards. When he died in 1605, the Wanli Emperor ordered three days of mourning and the construction of a tomb with many features of an imperial mausoleum to commemorate him.

== Tomb ==
Tian Yi's tomb (Chinese: 田義墓; pinyin: Tián Yì Mù) has a traditional layout in which a spirit way serves as a central axis and a division between a front portion used by visitors to pay their respects and a closed off back portion. Four eunuchs, who lived at the tomb as monks during the Qing dynasty are buried next to Tian Yi.

The tomb is particularly rich in stone carvings. The masonry artworks include three gates (front gate, Lingxing gate, and the graveyard gate), sculptures that line the spirit way, steles, ceremonial vessels, and stone altars for sacrifices. The names of 259 eunuchs who participated in his funeral are also inscribed at the tomb. Notably, the stone statues of the guards before the tomb both wear the uniforms of officials of the first rank, a sign of exceptional favour from the Emperor.

The tomb was looted during the period of the Republic of China. Today, it houses the Eunuch Museum, the address is 80 Moshikou Street, Shijingshan district, Beijing.
