= The Janissary Tree =

2006 historical mystery novel by Jason Goodwin

- First edition (UK)
- Author: Jason Goodwin
- Language: English
- Series: Yashim the Detective
- Genre: Historical mystery
- Publisher: Faber and Faber (UK); Farrar Straus and Giroux (US)
- Publication date: 16 May 2006
- Publication place: United Kingdom
- Media type: Print (hardback)
- Pages: 332
- ISBN: 0-571-22922-0
- OCLC: 64555080
- Followed by: The Snake Stone

The Janissary Tree is a 2006 historical mystery novel set in Istanbul in 1836, written by Jason Goodwin. It is the first in the Yashim the Detective series, followed by The Snake Stone, The Bellini Card, An Evil Eye and The Baklava Club. The series features Yashim, an eunuch detective, who is resourceful and learned in both the Ottoman culture and that of the West, enjoys the trust of the Sultan and high officials, and prefers to live in a rather bohemian lodging outside the palace complex. The novel deals with the fictional aftermath of the Auspicious Event, the disbanding (and mass killing) of the Janissaries, once elite troops of the Ottoman Empire.

== Plot ==
In June 1826, the Sultan Mahmud II violently disbands the Janissaries (an event now known as the Auspicious Incident), once elite troops of the Ottoman Empire but now an unruly military element beyond the control of the Sultan. Ten years later, the newly Westernized and modernized Ottoman Army which replaced the Janissaries are to perform a military exercise. Ten days before the event, four officers disappear; subsequently, one officer is found dead. The general entrusts Yashim the eunuch with solving the mystery. Meanwhile, the Sultan's newest concubine is murdered and the Sultan's mother's jewelry stolen. Yashim must simultaneously investigate three different cases.

The cases bring Yashim in and out of the palace, to various embassies, a mosque, and the alleyways and streets of Istanbul. To solve the cases, Yashim employs the assistance of the Polish ambassador and the wife of the Russian ambassador. He discovers that the cases are related, and that they not only involve a plot for revenge by surviving Janissaries hidden somewhere but also the power struggle between the palace eunuchs and the military's extreme pursuit of democratization. In the end, Yashim, against all odds, succeeds in preventing several conspiracies.

== Recognition ==
The Janissary Tree won an Edgar Award for Best Novel 2007 and has been translated into over 40 languages.

== Reception ==
Publishers Weekly highly commended Goodwin for doing an incredible job of "evoking his chosen locale. While his sleuth's character may be less developed than some readers might wish, no doubt Yashim will emerge as a more rounded figure in future entries of what one hopes will be a long-running series."

On the other hand Kirkus reviewed the book as lacking of excitement due to Goodwin's lack of using the material he has such as "the secret lives of harem girls, the sorrow of eunuchs, sufic mysticism, the bustling metropolis of 19th-century Istanbul."
