= Guanghua Temple (Beijing) =

Buddhist temple in Beijing, China

- 广化寺
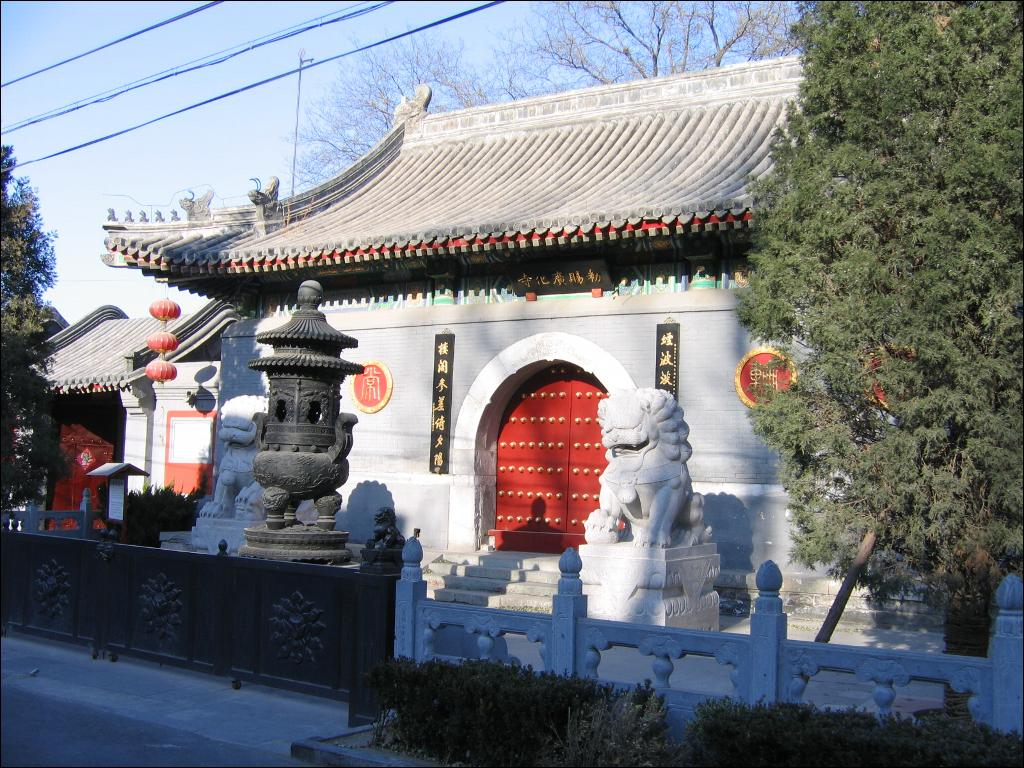
- Shanmen

- Location in Beijing.

Religion
- Affiliation: Buddhism

Location
- Location: Beijing
- Country: China
- Coordinates: 39°56′24″N 116°23′05″E

Architecture
- Style: Chinese architecture
- Established: about 1342

Guanghua Temple (simplified Chinese: 广化寺; traditional Chinese: 廣化寺; pinyin: Guǎnghuà Sì) is a Buddhist temple located at 31 Ya'er Hutong, north of Shichahai in the Xicheng District of Beijing, China. Founded during the Yuan dynasty (1271–1368), it is one of Beijing's most renowned Buddhist temples.
