= The Last Eunuch of China =

1992 biography of Sun Yaoting

The Last Eunuch of China: The Life of Sun Yaoting
- Author: Jia Yinghua
- Translator: Sun Haichen
- Language: Chinese
- Genre: Biography
- Publisher: China Intercontinental Press
- Publication date: 1998
- Publication place: China
- English publication date: October 2008
- Media type: Print (Paperback)
- Pages: 314 pp
- ISBN: 9787508514079

The Last Eunuch of China: The Life of Sun Yaoting (simplified Chinese: 末代太监孙耀庭传; traditional Chinese: 末代太監孫耀庭傳) is a 1992 biography by Chinese writer Jia Yinghua. This book depicts the entire real life of Sun Yaoting, the last imperial eunuch of China, from his entry into the imperial palace to his old age. As a person close to the emperor, the empress, and imperial concubines, he participated in royal court politics and witnessed extraordinary events, like the expulsion of Puyi from the royal palace, and his re-emergence as monarch of the puppet regime in Manchuria. He saw the last royal palace's extravagant lifestyle, experienced the breakdown of the last imperial dynasty, and felt the new changes brought by the new age. The Last Eunuch of China was partially translated into 15 foreign languages and published overseas. An English translation was published in 2008.

From a cross-generation friend's perspective, the author tells readers about life in the royal palace, the imperial gossip, and secrets of eunuchs in the eyes of a eunuch. He also displays the mindset and destinies of this group in that period of time.
