= Jia Yinghua =

Chinese writer and researcher (born 1952)

Jia Yinghua 賈英華
- Born: Jia Yinghua (賈英華); 1952 (age 73–74); Beijing, China
- Education: History- Beijing Normal University
- Occupation: Writer
- Writing career
- Pen name: 西貝、曲折
- Language: Chinese
- Period: 1979 – present
- Subjects: History, Biography
- Notable works: The Later Half of the Last Emperor's Life; The Last Eunuch of China: The Life of Sun Yaoting; The Last Emperor's Brother: The Life of Pu Jie
- Notable awards: Gold Key Award in the 5th Chinese Books Fair ? The Later Half of the Last Emperor’s Life The country's top prize for biographies in the 4th The Extraordinary Life of The Last Emperor of China

Jia Yinghua (simplified Chinese: 贾英华; traditional Chinese: 賈英華; pinyin: Jiǎ Yīnghuá) was a Chinese writer and researcher who focused on the late Qing dynasty. He served as Vice President of the Biography Society of China, commissioner of National Commission of the Chinese Writers’ Association, President of China中国's Electrical Power Writers' Association. Representative works of his include The Later Half of the Last Emperor's Life (Chinese: 末代皇帝的後半生), The Last Eunuch of China: The Life of Sun Yaoting (Chinese: 末代太監孫耀庭傳), The Last Emperor’s Brother: The Life of Pujie (Chinese: 末代皇弟溥傑傳).

The Japanese version of The Later Half of the Last Emperor's Life is a bestseller in Japan, attracting great attention and garnering enormous popularity. According to authoritative media and press organizations in more than 100 countries and regions, including China, the United Kingdom, the United States, France, Japan, Hong Kong, Macao, and Taiwan this book is a successful continuation of From Emperor to Citizen (Chinese: 我的前半生): The Autobiography of Aisin-Gioro Pu Yi (simplified Chinese: 爱新觉罗 溥仪; traditional Chinese: 愛新覺羅 溥儀) written by Puyi himself. The Chinese version of The Later Half of the Last Emperor’s Life is always a domestic bestseller and has been published nine times in total, and also won the Gold Key Award in the 5th Chinese Books Fair. His calligraphic works were also incorporated into First Exhibition of Chinese Celebrities’ Calligraphic Works, Exhibition of Contemporary Celebrities’ Paintings and Calligraphies, etc.
His book The Extraordinary Life of The Last Emperor of China was awarded the country's top prize for biographies in 2013.

== Early life ==
Jia Yinghua, a native of Beijing, grew up in Dongsi lane (hutong胡同) 9th, a neighbourhood known for its number of famous residents.

The old residence of Mei Lanfang 梅兰芳 lies in lane 9th where the love story between Mei and Meng took place. After the college student who kidnapped Mei was beheaded, his head was hung on the electricity pole at the entrance of the Hutong. The lane 8th has old residences of Zhu Qiling (Chinese: 朱啟鈴), an acting Premier of the Republic of China, Ye Shengtao叶圣陶， Zhang Shizhao章士钊, Tang Shengming (Chinese: 唐生明), Zhu Haibei (Chinese: 朱海北), an aunt of Puyi, and Zhu Yifan, a teacher of Puyi. The lane 7th has the old residence of Feng Deying (Chinese: 馮德英), the author of Bitter Cauliflower, and Zhang Ting (Puyi sent him to study overseas in Japan) also lived here once. The famous writer Hao Ran lived in lane 10th, and next to this was a small temple where a eunuch was residing. When Jia was still a kid, he always saw an old eunuch who was running the Ruixingcheng Oil & Salt Shop telling royal palace stories, sitting on the steps.

After entering junior high school, Jia Yinghua learned that one of his classmates had a neighbor named Yu Rongling who was a former female court official of Empress Dowager Cixi 慈禧太后. As Jia once attended a learning group in that courtyard, he could still remember that Rongling had pretty pale skin, white hair but looked young and fairly glamorous. When the Cultural Revolution started, Jia was in junior high school. One day, he found a manuscript of From Emperor to Citizen: The Autobiography of Aisin-Gioro Puyi in the Red Guards' Headquarters in Gulou, and spent the night reading it, and surprised himself that the world had such an interesting story, In 1967, Puyi 溥仪 died and his widow Li Shuxian moved into the Dongsi lane 8th. At that time, she had no contact with other neighbors but established quite a good relationship with Jia's mother. In his twenties, Jia had a break at home due to nephritis. At that moment, Li Shuxian was working in Guang'anmen Traditional Chinese Medicine Hospital, and often took him with her to take the earliest bus to her hospital to see a doctor.

After Premier Zhou Enlai 周恩来 died, Li Shuxian occasionally talked about how Premier Zhou cared about Puyi when he was alive. Jia had quite a few interviews with her probing these things. In 1980, an article was published on Battlefield．People's Daily and Xinhua Digest, marking the initial joint publish of articles between him and Li Shuxian. Afterwards, Jia and Li Shuxian got ready to write The Later Half of the Last Emperor's Life under invitation from Zhou Lei, the then director of the editing department of Social Sciences Frontline. Jia went to a couple of hospitals and solicited the medical treatment records of Puyi and digested relevant content and wrote the outline and interview framework, altogether more than 50,000 Chinese characters. Unfortunately, his documents were taken away by a magazine reporter who came to him under an appointment, and that reporter published his own article using Jia's manuscripts. Several years later, Jia sued that reporter in a law court. The latter told the judges that Jia only had junior high school education and was not capable of writing articles or books independently. His words greatly injured Jia who from that day made up his mind to write out the story about the latter half life of Puyi. In the ensuing decade, Jia collected historic files over again. He interviewed more than 300 people who were associated with Puyi successively and had accumulated enormous first-hand documents. During this painstaking period of time, his footprints were seen in Changchun in the north, Guangdong 广东 in the south, Penglai in the east, and he even consulted historic files written by Johnston in the British Library during his visit to the United Kingdom.

At that time Jia Yinghua was working in Beijing Thermal Power Plant located in Bawangfen (the 8th Princess’ Tomb) and had only one day off in a week, so he utilized evenings and all his holidays making interviews. He went all over the city of Beijing within 10 years in which he did not go to the cinema even once and had no TV set in his home. He also squeezed his wedding holiday to make interviews in Hebei and Shandong. The most embarrassing words were heard when he was interviewing Cai Duan (Chinese: 蔡端), the son of Cai E, a military general). When the old man learned that Jia Yinghua just went to grade 1 of junior high school and was a worker in a thermal power plant, he sniffed, "There are a lot of scholars in the literature history museum waiting to write books. You are a worker, just do your duty, why writing a book about Puyi?" Jia visited Cai Duan three times and the latter always refused to meet him, claiming that his wife was suffering an illness and it was not the right time. Jia said, "I have one question only: were you in the same office with Puyi or not?" This question was disputable for a long time as some people claimed it was true and some said it was not. Cai's answer was short, "Yes, I was." Despite failure of three visits, these words were considered precious by Jia as it clarified one historic detail.

Puyi once labored in Beijing Botanical Garden. To find out details in that time period, Jia rode his bicycle and crossed the city to interview Puyi's former colleagues. These people were quite enthusiastic and told him a lot of stories about Puyi. At noon, Jia ate steamed buns and drank two mouthfuls of tap water and had a short break lying on a wooden board cushioned with two pieces of newspapers, and resumed interviews in the afternoon. The most miserable case was that one day in order to find a witness, Jia set out at 6:00 A.M. and rode bicycle from Bawangfen to Summer Palace, and to Xiang Mountain, and returned to Shichahai in downtown Beijing. When he finally caught that witness, it was over 20:00 P.M
Liu Bao'an (Chinese: 劉寶安) was a coworker of Puyi in Beijing Botanical Garden. In order to find Liu, Jia walked two circles around the county of Penglai in Shandong Province and finally arrived at the geracomium where Liu was living. Liu once served in the Korean War and got quite excited when meeting Jia, saying that Jia was the first person to see him in the geracomium. Liu gave Jia a lot of original letters (including the precious envelopes) written by Puyi. These letters were strong proof that Chairman Mao did meet with Puyi. The exact date and time of their meeting could be found in the letters, thus solving a long disputable question in the research of Puyi.
Jia Yinghua was quite perseverant. In 40 years, he never stopped interviewing all witnesses who stayed with Puyi and kept audio records of most interviews. He even made cross-generation friends with many royal family members, like Pujie 溥杰and Runqi, who was a younger brother of Wanrong, etc. In addition, Jia also became a good friend of Sun Yaoting, the last eunuch of China, and made audio tapes for nearly 100 hours and more than 10 Betamax video tapes.

On May 29, 1980, the memorial meeting for Puyi began. When he died in 1967, there was a meager cremains casket and short inscription written by Pujie. In the political climate, family members decided to give him a bigger casket made of pear wood. Li Shuxian also asked Jia Yinghua to write the epigraph, Pujie nodded with pleasure. Therefore, Jia Yinghua became the person who wrote the epigraph for the last emperor of China.

Jia completed nine books of the Last Emperor Series. Among the over 300 interviewees Jia had talked with, most have died, so the audio and video tapes made with these people become precious historical documents.

== Works ==
He once wrote the epigraph for Puyi, successfully continued the writing of the story of the latter half of the last emperor of China, wrote the stele inscription for the last eunuch Sun Yaoting, and wrote nine books about the last royal family.

Worker, shift chief, and Communist Youth League Secretary of Beijing Thermal Power Plant, Communist Youth League Secretary of the general plant, director of the North China Journalist Station of North China Power Administration's Electrical Power Newspaper, Deputy Department Head, Department Head and Vice Director of the Secretary Bureau of the State Council, Deputy Head of the Electrical Power Department of the State Economic and Trade Commission, Director of the Power Supply Department of the State Electricity Regulatory Commission, successively.

Member of the 6th, 7th, and 8th sessions of National Commission of Chinese Writers’ Association.

In addition to the aforesaid works, he also wrote The Last Eunuch of China-The Life of Sun Yaoting (Chinese: 末代太監孫耀庭傳) (English and Japanese version published, partially translated into 15 foreign languages), Documentary Works of Heir Selection by the Last Emperor (Chinese: 末代皇帝立嗣紀實) (chosen as a bestseller in the 2nd Beijing Books Fair), The Last Emperor’s Brother-The Life of Pu Jie (Chinese: 末代皇弟溥傑傳) (accredited as Top 10 Bestsellers in the United States among Chinese publications worldwide), and Unlocking the Secrets of the Last Emperor's Final Marriage (Chinese: 末代皇帝最後一次婚姻解密) (the overseas tradition Chinese version published, causing comments from hundreds of media and press organizations inside and outside China). Among these works of his, the Japanese version of The Last Eunuch of China – The Life of Sun Yaoting went through seven print runs within a few months. He also wrote other books such as The Birth of New China’s National Flag, National Anthem, National Emblem, Capital, and Chronology (chosen as a politics textbook counsel by the State Education Commission). In 2012, his Last Emperor's Family serial was published by the People's Literature Publishing House, namely, The Extraordinary Life of The Last Emperor of China: Telling The Pu Yi That You Don't Know (Chinese: 末代皇帝的非常人生-告訴你一個人所不知的溥儀), The Last Emperor’s Sister-The Life of Yun He (Chinese: 末代皇妹韞龢), The Last Emperor’s Uncle-The Life of Zaitao (Chinese: 末代皇叔載濤), and The Last Emperor’s Brother-in-law-The Life of Runqi (Chinese: 末代國舅潤麒). In addition, he also wrote a lot of reportage, prose, travelogues, poems, and so on.

Through the years, Jia Yinghua interviewed hundreds of people, and collected documents and files carrying hundreds of thousands of words depicting the lives of the last emperor, the last eunuch, and other figures who lived in the royal palace in the late Qing dynasty, and some of these documents are barely known to the public. He also has some precious photographs taken in the late Qing dynasty which could be found in nowhere else. He audio taped some figures since the late Qing dynasty for hundreds of hours at his own expenses, and shot a huge amount of documentary films of historic figures since the same period of time, such as, The Last Eunuch Traveling in The Imperial Palace, The Last Eunuch Recalling His Life, Documentary of The Life of The Last Royal Family, etc., attracting great eyesight from both inside and outside China.

What’ s more, he is also one of the storytellers for the large-volume documentary The Imperial Palace.

Around Feb. 12th, 2012, major portal sites, like www.sina.com.cn, www.yahoo.com successively presented a video program Decoding The Last Imperial Decree lectured by Jia Yinghua. Coincidentally, on the same day 100 years ago, the then 6-year-old emperor Xuantong announced his abdication with an imperial decree, signaling the end of the feudal imperial system for more than 2,000 years in the land of China.

Jia Yinghua exposed a lot of cultural relics he had collected over years in the process of filming Decoding The Last Imperial Decree video series, such as the Puyi Abdication Decree and the Preferential Conditions for The Qing Royal Family printed by the Department of Colonial Affairs 100 years ago, and a great amount of precious photographs taken in old times which were exposed for the first time to public. This is the first high-definition video work of his in the aftermath of 9 works about historic figures in the late Qing dynasty, namely, The Later Half of the Last Emperor's Life, The Last Eunuch of China – The Life of Sun Yaoting, etc.

== List of works ==
- 末代皇帝的後半生《The Later Half of the Last Emperor's Life》. CHINESE: Masses Press. 1989.—the Gold Key Award in the 5th Chinese Books Fair
- 末代皇帝的後半生《The Later Half of the Last Emperor's Life》. republication. CHINESE: People’s Literature Publishing House. 2004. ISBN 978-7-02-004589-1.
- 末代太監孫耀庭傳《The Last Eunuch of China – The life of Sun Yaoting》. CHINESE: Knowledge Publishing House. 1992.—partially translated into 15 foreign languages and published overseas
- 末代太監孫耀庭傳《The Last Eunuch of China – The life of Sun Yaoting》. republication. CHINESE: People’s Literature Publishing House. 2004. ISBN 978-7-02-004590-7.
- The Last Eunuch of China-The Life of Sun Yaoting. English translation. ENGLISH: China Intercontinental Press. 2008. ISBN 9787508514079.
- 末代皇帝的立嗣紀實《Documentary Works of Heir Selection for The Last Emperor》 (in Chinese). Kaiming Press. 1993.—bestseller of the 2nd Beijing Books Fair
- 末代皇帝的立嗣紀實《Documentary Works of Heir Selection for The Last Emperor》. republication. CHINESE: People’s Literature Publishing House. 2004. ISBN 978-7-02-004588-4.
- 末代皇弟溥傑《The Last Emperor's Brother-The Life of Pu Jie》. CHINESE: Writers Publishing House. 2002.—accredited as Top 10 USA Bestsellers
- 末代皇弟溥傑《The Last Emperor's Brother-The Life of Pu Jie》. republication. CHINESE: People’s Literature Publishing House. 2004. ISBN 978-7-02-004606-5.
- 末代皇帝最後一次婚姻解密《Decryption of The Last Marriage of The Last Emperor of China》. CHINESE: Masses Press. 2001. ISBN 7-5014-2463-2.
- 《愛新覚羅溥儀 最後の人生》. JAPANESE: 時事通信社. 1995. ISBN 978-4788795372.
- 《最後の宦官秘聞―ラストエンペラー溥儀に仕えて》. JAPANESE: 日本放送出版協会. 2002. ISBN 978-4140807101.
- 末代皇帝的非常人生"The Extraordinary Life of The Last Emperor of China". CHINESE: People’s Literature Publishing House. 2012. ISBN 978-7-02-0088607.
- 末代皇妹韞龢《The Last Emperor's Sister-The Life of Yun He》. CHINESE: People’s Literature Publishing House. 2012. ISBN 978-7-02-008854-6.
- 末代皇叔載濤《The Last Emperor's Uncle-The Life of Zaitao》. CHINESE: People’s Literature Publishing House. 2012. ISBN 978-7-02-008819-5.
- 末代國舅潤麒《The Last Emperor's Brother-in-law-The Life of Runqi》. CHINESE: People’s Literature Publishing House. 2012. ISBN 978-7-02-008818-8.
