= Ernst Maass =

German classical philologist (1856-1929)

Ernst Maass (12 April 1856, in Kolberg – 11 November 1929, in Marburg) was a German classical philologist.

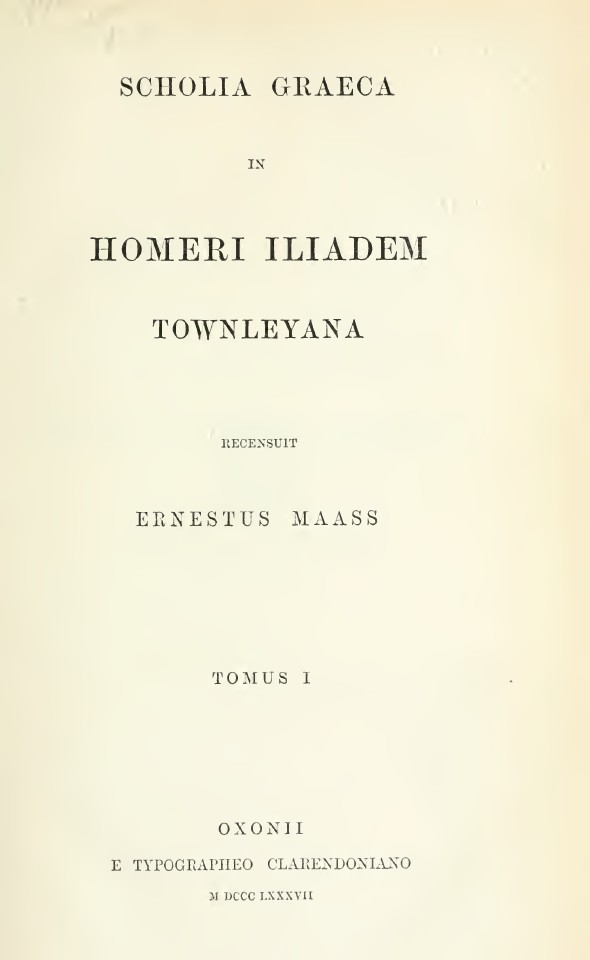
Scholia Graeca in Homeri Iliadem Townleyana, 1887

From 1875 he studied at the universities of Tübingen and Greifswald, receiving his doctorate in 1879 as a student of Ulrich von Wilamowitz-Moellendorff. After graduation, he took an extended study trip to Italy, Paris and London (1880–82), and afterwards qualified as a lecturer in Berlin with the habilitation-thesis Analecta Eratosthenica. In 1886, he was named a professor at the University of Greifswald, and from 1895 to 1924, served as a professor and director of the philological seminary at the University of Marburg. He was rector at the university in 1910–1911.

== Selected works ==
- Arati Phaenomena (edition of Aratus' Phaenomena).
- Commentatio mythographica, 1886.
- De Attali Rhodii fragmentis Arateis commentatio, 1888.
- Scholia Graeca in Homeri Iliadem Townleyana (with Wilhelm Dindorf, 1888).
- Parerga Attica, 1889.
- De Aeschyli Supplicibus commentatio, 1890.
- De tribus Philetae carminibus, 1895.
- Orpheus; Untersuchungen zur griechischen, römischen, altchristlichen Jenseitsdichtung und Religion, 1895 – Orpheus: Investigations of Greek, Roman and early Christian afterlife literature and religion.
- De Lenaeo et Delphinio commentatio, 1896.
- Commentariorum in Aratum reliquiae, 1898.
- Analecta sacra et profana, 1901.
- Die Tagesgötter in Rom und den Provinzen, aus der Kultur des Niederganges der antiken Welt, 1902 – The Tagesgötter in Rome and the provinces.
- Griechen und Semiten auf dem Isthmus von Korinth, 1903 – Greeks and Semites on the Isthmus of Corinth.
- Goethe und die antike, 1912 – Goethe and antiquity.
