= The Snake Stone =

Historical mystery novel by Jason Goodwin

- Author: Jason Goodwin
- Language: English
- Genre: Fiction
- Publication date: 2008
- ISBN: 978-0-312-42802-0

The Snake Stone (ISBN 9780312428020) is the second in a series of detective novels by Jason Goodwin, featuring the eunuch Yashim. It is set in Constantinople in 1838. In 2008, the novel was nominated for a Macavity Award.

The book was translated into Hebrew by Daphna Levy in 2008.

== Plot ==
The novel is set in Istanbul, 1838. Lefevre, a French archaeologist, has arrived in Istanbul with the goal of uncovering a lost Byzantine treasure. The eunuch Yashim is hired to investigate him, but becomes a suspect when the archaeologist turns up dead. The story follows Yashim's efforts to uncover the truth behind a secret society dedicated to the revival of the Byzantine empire.
