= Eunuch =

Castrated male human

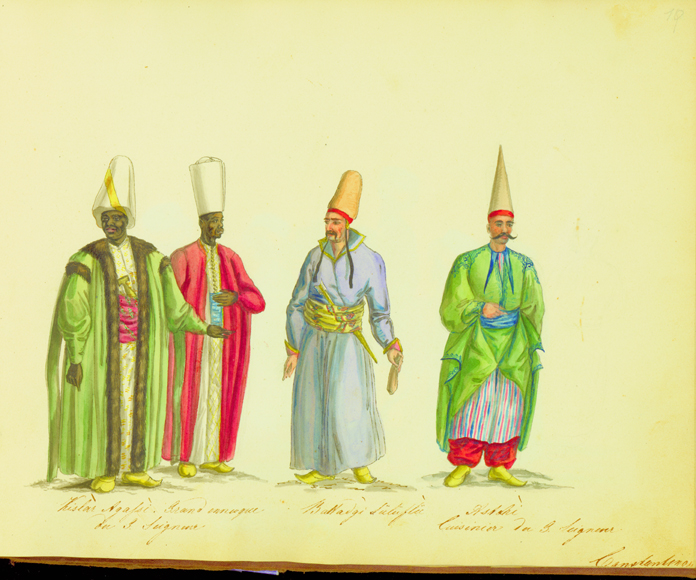
The Harem Ağası, head of the black eunuchs of the Ottoman Imperial Harem

A eunuch (/ˈjuː.nək/ YOO-nək, Ancient Greek: εὐνοῦχος) is a boy or man who has been castrated. Throughout history, castration often served a specific social function. The earliest records for intentional castration to produce eunuchs are from the Sumerian city of Lagash in the 2nd millennium BC. Over the millennia since, eunuchs performed a wide variety of functions in many different cultures: courtiers or equivalent domestics, for espionage or clandestine operations, castrato singers, concubines or sexual partners, religious specialists, soldiers, royal guards, government officials, and guardians of women or harem servants.

Eunuchs were usually servants or slaves who were castrated to make them less threatening servants of a royal court where physical access to the ruler could wield great influence. Seemingly lowly domestic functions—such as making the ruler's bed, bathing him, cutting his hair, carrying him in his litter, or even relaying messages—could, in theory, give a eunuch "the ruler's ear" and impart de facto power to the formally humble but trusted servant.

Eunuchs supposedly did not generally have loyalties to the military, the aristocracy, or a family of their own (having neither offspring nor in-laws, at the very least). They were thus seen as more trustworthy and less interested in establishing a private dynasty. Because their condition usually lowered their social status, they could also be easily replaced or killed without repercussion.

Eunuchs have been documented in several ancient and medieval societies, including the Byzantine Empire, Imperial China, the Ottoman Empire, and various cultures in Asia and Africa. They often held significant power and influence in these societies, particularly in royal courts and harems.

== Etymology ==
Eunuch comes from the Ancient Greek word εὐνοῦχος (eunoûkhos), first attested in a fragment of Hipponax, the 6th century BCE comic poet and prolific inventor of compound words. The poet describes a particular lover of fine food having "consumed his estate dining lavishly and at leisure every day on tuna and garlic-honey cheese paté like a Lampsacene eunoukhos."

The earliest surviving etymologies of the word are from late antiquity. Epiphanius of Salamis derived the word from the Greek eunous meaning loyal or well-disposed. The 5th century (CE) Etymologicon by Orion of Thebes offers two alternative origins for the word eunuch: first, to tēn eunēn ekhein, "guarding the bed", a derivation inferred from eunuchs' established role at the time as "bedchamber attendants" in the imperial palace, and second, to eu tou nou ekhein, "being good with respect to the mind", which Orion explains based on their "being deprived of intercourse (esterēmenou tou misgesthai), the things that the ancients used to call irrational (anoēta, literally: 'mindless')". Echoing the derivation by Epiphanius, Orion's second option reflects well-established idioms in Ancient Greek, as shown by entries for transl. grc – transl. noos, eunoos and ekhein in Liddell and Scott's Greek-English Lexicon, while the first option is not listed as an idiom under eunē in that standard reference work. However, the first option was cited by the late 9th century Byzantine emperor Leo VI in his New Constitution 98 banning the marriage of eunuchs, in which he noted eunuchs' reputation as trustworthy guardians of the marriage bed (eunē) and claimed that the very word eunuch attested to this kind of employment. The emperor also goes further than Orion by attributing eunuchs' lack of male–female intercourse specifically to castration, which he said was performed with the intention "that they will no longer do the things that males do, or at least to extinguish whatever has to do with desire for the female sex". The 11th century Byzantine monk Nikon of the Black Mountain, opting instead for Orion's second alternative, stated that the word came from eunoein (eu "good" + nous "mind"), thus meaning "to be well-minded, well-inclined, well-disposed or favorable", but unlike Orion he argued that this was due to the trust that certain jealous and suspicious foreign rulers placed in the loyalty of their eunuchized servants. Theophylact of Ohrid in a dialogue In Defence of Eunuchs also stated that the origin of the word was from eupnoeic and ekhein, "to have, hold", since they were always "well-disposed" toward the master who "held" or owned them. The 12th century Etymologicum Magnum (s.v. eunoukhos) essentially repeats the entry from Orion, but stands by the first option, while attributing the second option to what "some say". In the late 12th century, Eustathius of Thessalonica (Commentaries on Homer 1256.30, 1643.16) offered an original derivation of the word from eunis + okheuein, "deprived of mating".

In translations of the Bible into modern European languages, such as the Luther Bible or the King James Bible, the word eunuchs as found in the Latin Vulgate is usually rendered as an officer, official or chamberlain, consistent with the idea that the original meaning of eunuch was bed-keeper (Orion's first option). Modern religious scholars have been disinclined to assume that the courts of Israel and Judah included castrated men, even though the original translation of the Bible into Greek used the word eunoukhos.

The early 17th-century scholar and theologian Gerardus Vossius therefore explains that the word originally designated an office, and he affirms the view that it was derived from eunē and ekhein (i.e. "bed-keeper"). He says the word came to be applied to castrated men in general because such men were the usual holders of that office. Still, Vossius notes the alternative etymologies offered by Eustathius ("deprived of mating") and others ("having the mind in a good state"), calling these analyses "quite subtle". Then, after having previously declared that eunuch designated an office (i.e., not a personal characteristic), Vossius ultimately sums up his argument in a different way, saying that the word "originally signified continent men" to whom the care of women was entrusted, and later came to refer to castration because "among foreigners" that role was performed "by those with mutilated bodies".

Modern etymologists have followed Orion's first option. In an influential 1925 essay on the word eunuch and related terms, Ernst Maass suggested that Eustathius's derivation "can or must be laid to rest", and he affirmed the derivation from eunē and ekhein ("guardian of the bed"), without mentioning the other derivation from eunoos and ekhein ("having a well-disposed state of mind").

In Latin, the words eunuchus, spado (Greek: σπάδων spadon), and castratus were used to denote eunuchs.

== Non-castrated eunuchs ==
The term eunuch has sometimes figuratively been used for a wide range of men who were seen to be physically unable to procreate. Hippocrates describes the Scythians as being afflicted with high rates of erectile dysfunction and thus "the most eunuchoid of all nations" (Airs Waters Places 22). In the Charlton T. Lewis, Charles Short, A Latin Dictionary, the term literally used for impotent males is spado but may also be used for eunuchs.

Some men have falsified the status of their castration to gain entrance into the palace. Chinese eunuch Lao Ai, for instance, became the lover of the mother of Qin Shi Huang, who bore him two sons, before Lao Ai and his sons were executed after participating in a rebellion against Qin Shi Huang.

== Asia and Africa ==
In Siam (modern Thailand), Indian Muslims from the Coromandel Coast served as eunuchs in the Thai palace and court. The Thai at times asked eunuchs from China to visit the court in Thailand and advise them on court ritual since they held them in high regard.

In Imperial China, eunuchs managed the imperial household and were involved in state affairs, often wielding significant political power.

Sir Henry Yule saw many Muslims serving as eunuchs during the Konbaung dynasty period of Burma (modern Myanmar) while on a diplomatic mission.

=== China ===
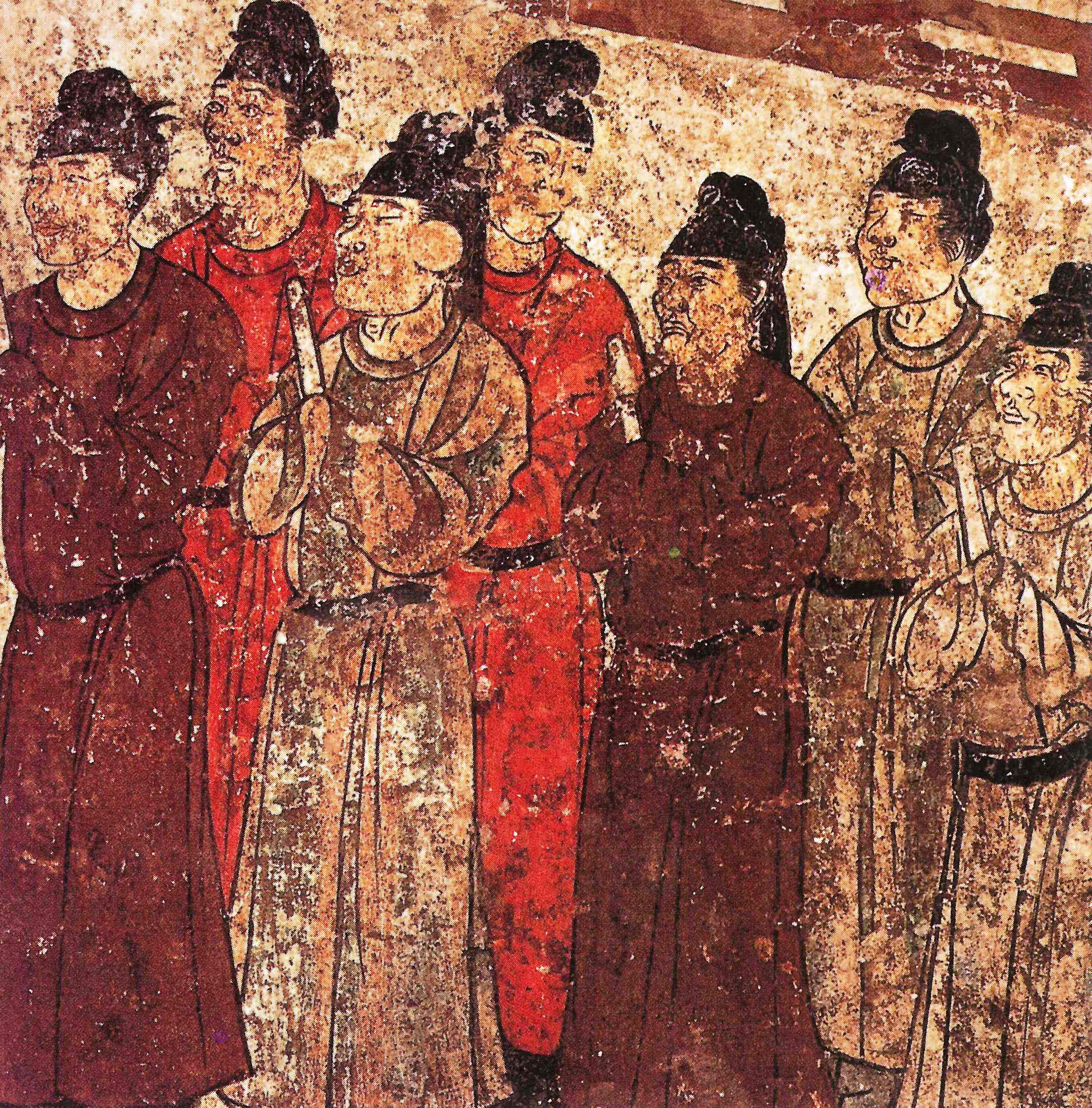
A group of eunuchs. Mural from the tomb of the prince Zhanghuai, 706 AD.

In China, castration included removal of the penis as well as the testicles (see emasculation). Both organs were cut off with a knife at the same time.

Eunuchs existed in China from about 2,000 BCE, were imperial servants by 1,000 BCE, and were common as civil servants by the time of the Qin dynasty. From those ancient times until the Sui dynasty, castration was both a traditional punishment (one of the Five Punishments) and a means of gaining employment in the imperial service. Certain eunuchs, such as the Ming dynasty official Zheng He, gained immense power that occasionally superseded that of even the Grand Secretaries. Self-castration was a common practice, although it was not always performed completely, which led to it being made illegal.

It is said that the justification for the employment of eunuchs as high-ranking civil servants was that, since they were incapable of having children, they would not be tempted to seize power and start a dynasty. In many cases, eunuchs were considered more reliable than the scholar-officials. As a symbolic assignment of heavenly authority to the palace system, a constellation of stars was designated as the Emperor's, and, to the west of it, four stars were identified as his "eunuchs".

The tension between eunuchs in the service of the emperor and virtuous Confucian officials is a familiar theme in Chinese history. In his History of Government, Samuel Finer points out that reality was not always that clear-cut. There were instances of very capable eunuchs who were valuable advisers to their emperor, and the resistance of the "virtuous" officials often stemmed from jealousy on their part. Ray Huang argues that in reality, eunuchs represented the personal will of the Emperor, while the officials represented the alternative political will of the bureaucracy. The clash between them would thus have been a clash of ideologies or political agenda.

The number of eunuchs in imperial employ fell to 470 by 1912, when the practice of using them ceased. The last imperial eunuch, Sun Yaoting, died in December 1996.

=== Indian subcontinent ===
==== Eunuchs in Indian sultanates (before the Mughals) ====
Eunuchs were employed in imperial palaces by some Muslim rulers as servants for female royalty, as guards of the royal harem, and as sexual mates for the nobles. Some of them attained high-status positions in society. An early example of such a high-ranking eunuch was Malik Kafur. Eunuchs in imperial palaces were organized in a hierarchy, often with a senior or chief eunuch (Urdu: Khwaja Saras), directing junior eunuchs below him. Eunuchs were highly valued for their strength and trustworthiness, allowing them to live amongst women with fewer worries. This enabled eunuchs to serve as messengers, watchmen, attendants and guards for palaces. Often, eunuchs also doubled as part of the King's court of advisers.

==== The hijra of South Asia ====
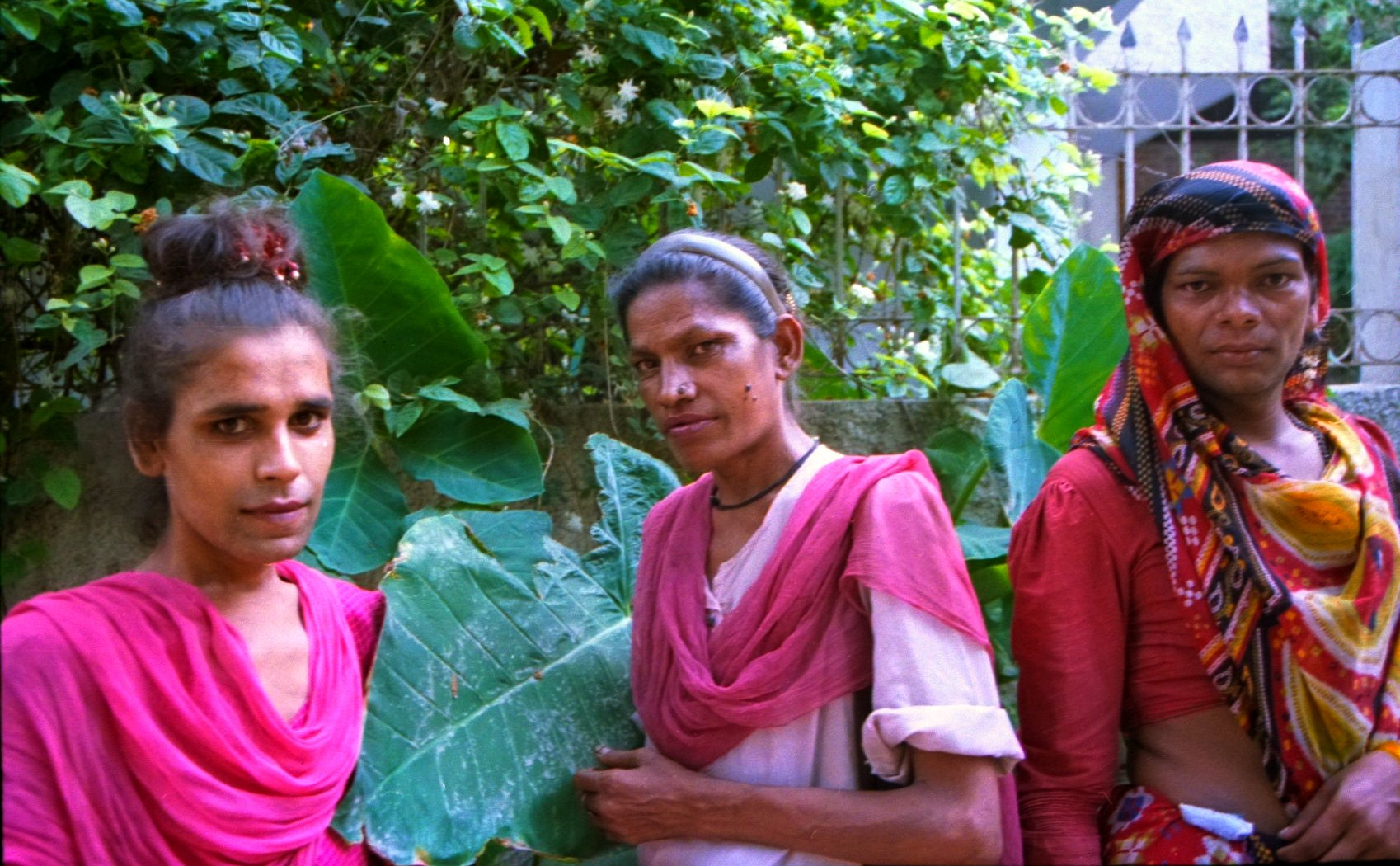
Hijras of Delhi, India

Hijra, a Hindi term traditionally translated into English as "eunuch", actually refers to what modern Westerners would call transvestites or transgender women (although some of them reportedly identify as belonging to a third gender). The history of this third sex is mentioned in the ancient Kama Sutra, which refers to people of a "third sex" (tritiya-prakriti). Some of them undergo ritual castration, but the vast majority do not.

They usually dress in saris or shalwar kameez (traditional garbs worn by women in South Asia) and wear heavy make-up. They typically live on the margins of society and face discrimination. Hijra tend to have few options for earning a wage, with many turning to sex work and others performing ritualistic songs and dances. They are integral to several Hindu ceremonies, such as dance programs at marriage ceremonies. They may also earn a living by going uninvited to large ceremonies such as weddings, births, new shop openings and other major family events, and singing until they are paid or given gifts to go away. The ceremony is supposed to bring good luck and fertility, while the curse of an unappeased hijra is feared by many. Hijra often engage in prostitution and begging to earn money, with begging typically accompanied by singing and dancing. Some Indian provincial officials have used the assistance of hijras to collect taxes in the same fashion—they knock on the doors of shopkeepers, while dancing and singing, embarrassing them into paying. Recently, hijras have started to found organizations to improve their social condition and fight discrimination, such as the Shemale Foundation Pakistan.

=== Korea ===
The eunuchs of Korea, called Korean: 내시, 內侍, romanized: naesi, were officials to the king and other royalty in traditional Korean society. The first recorded appearance of a Korean eunuch was in Goryeosa ("History of Goryeo"), a compilation about the Goryeo dynasty period. In 1392, with the founding of the Joseon dynasty, the naesi system was revised, and the department was renamed the "Department of Naesi".

The naesi system included two ranks, those of Korean: 상선, 尙膳, romanized: Sangseon, lit. 'Chief of Naesi', who held the official title of senior second rank, and Korean: 내관, 內官, romanized: Naegwan, lit. 'Common official naesi', both of which held rank as officers. A total of 140 naesi served the palace in the Joseon dynasty period. They also took the exam on Confucianism every month. The naesi system was repealed in 1894 following Gabo reform.

During the Yuan dynasty of China, eunuchs became a desirable commodity for tributes.

Eunuchs were the only males outside the royal family allowed to stay inside the palace overnight. In one historical study of court records, going back to 1392, researchers surmised that the average lifespan of eunuchs appeared to have been 70.0 ± 1.76 years, and that this was 14.4–19.1 years longer than the lifespan of non-castrated men of similar socioeconomic status. However, the quality of this evidence is lacking, and in a letter to the editor of the journal Gerontology, Éric Le Bourg notes that this single study should not be relied upon to conclude that eunuchs in fact lived longer than non-castrated men, even in this Korean case.

=== Vietnam ===
The Vietnamese adopted the eunuch system and castration techniques from China. Records show that the Vietnamese performed castration in a painful procedure by removing the entire genitalia with both penis and testicles being cut off with a sharp knife or metal blade. The procedure was agonizing since the entire penis was cut off. The young man's thighs and abdomen would be tied and others would pin him down on a table. The genitals would be washed with pepper water and then cut off. A tube would be then inserted into the urethra to allow urination during healing. Many Vietnamese eunuchs were products of self castration to gain access to the palaces and power. In other cases they might be paid to become eunuchs. They served in many capacities, from supervising public works, to investigating crimes, to reading public proclamations.

=== West Asia and North Africa ===
==== Ancient ====
The four-thousand-year-old Egyptian Execration Texts threaten enemies in Nubia and Asia, specifically referencing "all males, all eunuchs, all women."

Castration was sometimes punitive; under Assyrian law, homosexual acts were punishable by castration.

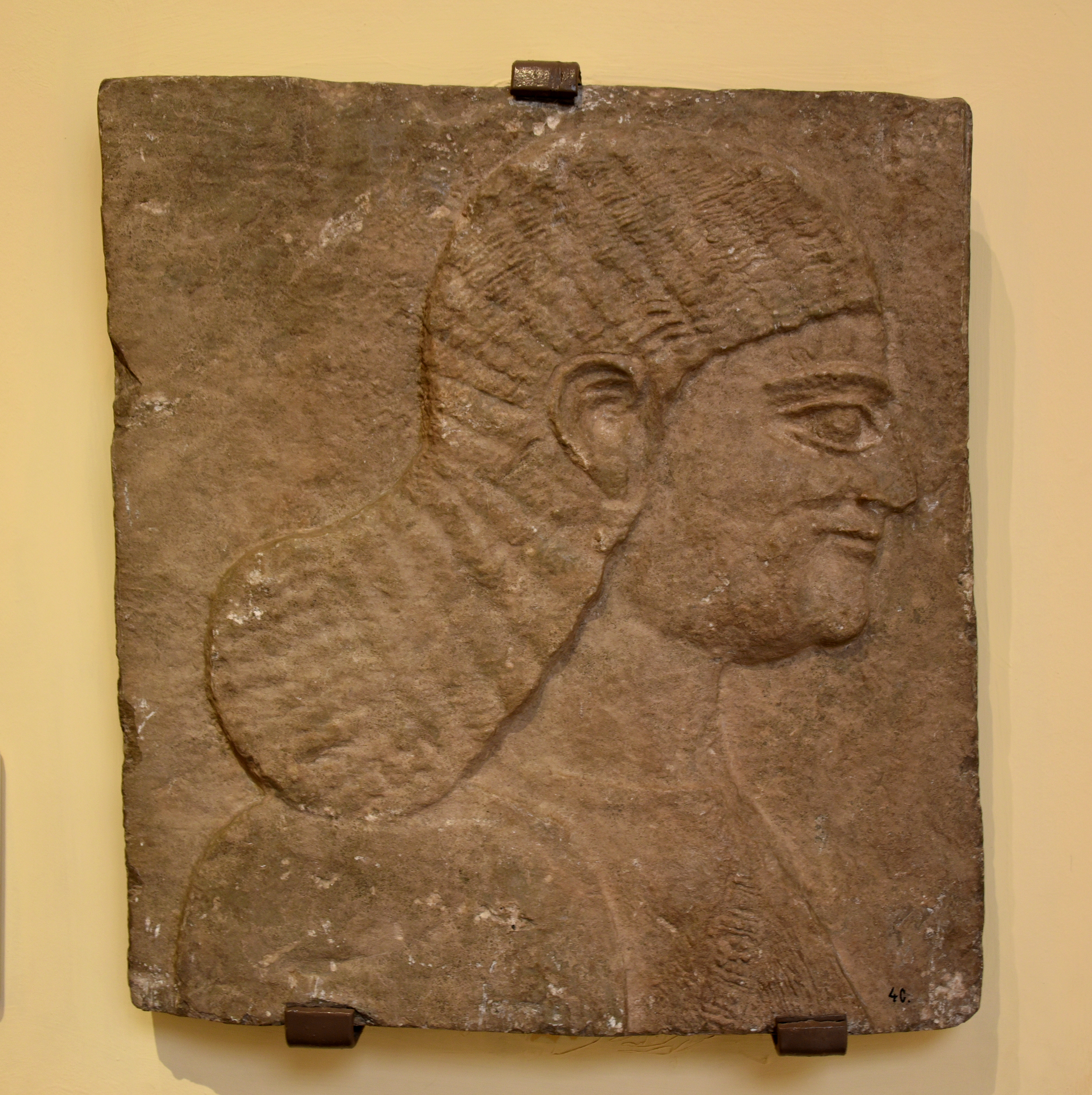
Limestone wall relief depicting an Assyrian royal attendant, a eunuch. From the Central Palace at Nimrud, Iraq, 744–727 BCE. Ancient Orient Museum, Istanbul.

Eunuchs were familiar figures in the Neo-Assyrian Empire (Akkadian: ša rēš šarri izuzzū "the one who stands by the head of the king", often abbreviated as ša rēš; c. 850 until 622 BCE) and in the court of the Egyptian pharaohs (down to the Lagid dynasty known as Ptolemies, ending with Cleopatra VII, 30 BCE). Eunuchs sometimes were used as regents for underage heirs to the throne, as it seems to be the case for the Syro-Hittite state of Carchemish.

Political eunuchism became a fully established institution among the Achaemenid Empire. Eunuchs (called Imperial Aramaic: סריס, romanized: səris, an Assyrian loanword) held powerful positions in the Achaemenid court. The eunuch Bagoas (not to be confused with Alexander's Bagoas) was the vizier of Artaxerxes III and Artaxerxes IV, and was the primary power behind the throne during their reigns until he was killed by Darius III.

Marmon (1995) writes "Mamluk biographies of the eunuchs often praise their appearance with adjectives such as jamil (beautiful), wasim (handsome), and ahsan (the best, most beautiful) or akmal (the most perfect)."

==== Arabian Peninsula ====
The custom of using eunuchs as servants for women inside the Islamic harems had a preceding example in the life of Muhammad himself, who used the eunuch Mabur as a servant in the house of his own slave concubine Maria al-Qibtiyya; both of them slaves from Egypt. Eunuchs were for a long time used in West Asia and North Africa, especially as members of harems, but the use of eunuchs expanded significantly when eunuchs started being used also for other offices within service and administration outside of the harem, a use which expanded gradually during the Umayyad Caliphate and had its breakthrough during the Abbasid Caliphate. During the Abbasid period, eunuchs became a permanent institution inside the Islamic harems after the model of the Abbasid harem, such as in the Fatimid harem, Safavid harem and the Qajar harem.

For several centuries, Muslim eunuchs were tasked with honored roles in Medina and Mecca. They are thought to have been instituted in their role there by Saladin, but perhaps earlier. Their tasks included caring for the Prophet's Tomb, maintaining borders between males and females where needed, and keeping order in the sacred spaces. They were highly respected in their time and remained there throughout the Ottoman Empire's control of the area and afterward. In the present day, it is reported that only a few remain.

Eunuchs were an active component in the slave market of the Islamic world until the early 20th-century for service in harem as well as in the corps of mostly African eunuchs, known as the Aghawat, who guarded the Prophet Muhammad's tomb in Medina and the Kaʿba in Mecca. Most slaves trafficked to Hijaz came there via the Red Sea slave trade. Small African boys were castrated before they were trafficked to the Hijaz, where they were bought at the slave market by the Chief Agha to become eunuch novices. It was noted that boys from Africa were still openly bought to become eunuch novices to serve at Medina in 1895. In Medina, there was a part of town named Harat al-Aghawat (Neighborhood of the Aghas). The Red Sea slave trade became gradually more suppressed during the 20th-century, and Slavery in Saudi Arabia was abolished in 1962. In 1979, the last Agha was appointed. In 1990, seventeen eunuchs remained.

==== Fatimid Caliphate ====
In the Isma'ili Fatimid Caliphate (909–1171 CE), eunuchs played major roles in the politics of the caliphate's court within the institution of slavery in the Fatimid Caliphate. These eunuchs were normally purchased from slave auctions and typically came from a variety of Arab and non-Arab minority ethnic groups. In some cases, they were purchased from various noble families in the empire, which would then connect those families to the caliph. Generally, though, foreign slaves were preferred, described as the "ideal servants".

Once enslaved, eunuchs were often placed into positions of significant power in one of four areas: the service of the male members of the court; the service of the Fatimid harem, or female members of the court; administrative and clerical positions; and military service. For example, during the Fatimid occupation of Cairo, Egyptian eunuchs controlled military garrisons (shurta) and marketplaces (hisba), two positions beneath only the city magistrate in power. However, the most influential Fatimid eunuchs were the ones in direct service to the caliph and the royal household as chamberlains, treasurers, governors, and attendants. Their direct proximity to the caliph and his household afforded them a great amount of political sway. One eunuch, Jawdhar, became hujja to Imam-Caliph al-Qa'im, a sacred role in Shia Islam entrusted with the imam's choice of successor upon his death.

There were several other eunuchs of high regard in Fatimid history, mainly being Abu'l-Fadi Rifq al-Khadim and Abu'l-Futuh Barjawan al-Ustadh. Rifq was an African eunuch general who served as governor of the Damascus until he led an army of 30,000 men in a campaign to expand Fatimid control northeast to the city of Aleppo, Syria. He was noted for being able to unite a diverse group of Africans, Arabs, Bedouins, Berbers, and Turks into one coherent fighting force which was able to successfully combat the Mirdasids, Bedouins, and Byzantines.

Barjawan was a European eunuch during late Fatimid rule who gained power through his military and political savvy which brought peace between them and the Byzantine empire. Moreover, he squashed revolts in the Libya and the Levant. Given his reputation and power in the court and military he took the reins of the caliphate from his then student al-Hakim bi-Amr Allah; then ruled as the de facto Regent 997 CE. His usurpation of power from the caliph resulted in his assassination in 1000 CE on the orders of al-Hakim.

Since imams during this period ruled over a majority non-Shi'a population, the court eunuchs served an important informal role as ambassadors of the caliph, promoting loyalty and devotion to the Shi'a sect and the imam-caliph himself. The multicultural, multilingual eunuchs were able to connect to the commoners through shared cultural ground.

==== Ottoman Empire ====
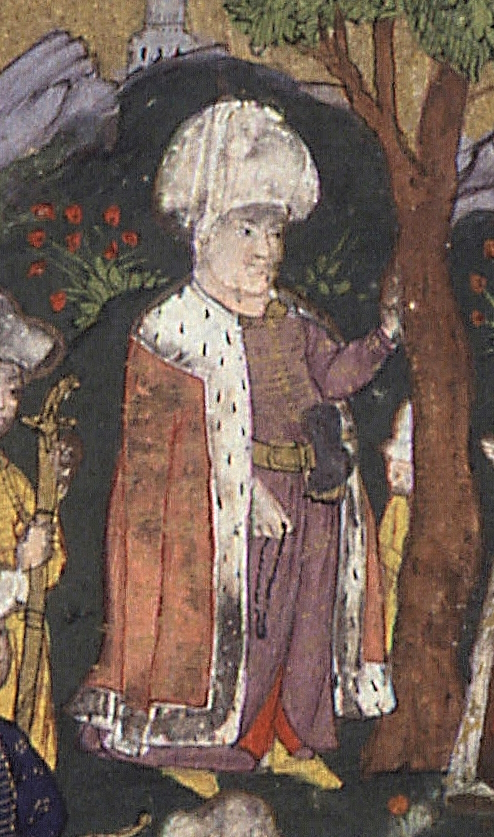
Hadim Yusuf Pasha, Ottoman Governor of Baghdad in 1605-1606, a Circassian by birth and a eunuch. Sefernāme of Muhlisi (BNF, Turc 127).

During the period of slavery in the Ottoman Empire, eunuchs were typically slaves imported from outside their domains. A fair proportion of male slaves were imported as eunuchs.

The Ottoman court harem—within the Topkapı Palace (1465–1853) and later the Dolmabahçe Palace (1853–1909) in Istanbul—was under the administration of the eunuchs. These were of two categories: black eunuchs and white eunuchs. Black eunuchs were slaves from sub-Saharan Africa via the Trans-Saharan slave trade, the Red Sea slave trade or the Indian Ocean slave trade, who served the concubines and officials in the Harem together with chamber maidens of low rank.

The white eunuchs were slaves from the Balkans or the Caucasus, either purchased in the slave markets or taken as boys from Christian families in the Balkans who were unable to pay the jizya tax. They served the recruits at the Palace School and were from 1582 prohibited from entering the Harem. An important figure in the Ottoman court was the Chief Black Eunuch (Kızlar Ağası or Darüssaade Ağası). In control of both the harem and a net of spies among the black eunuchs, the Chief Eunuch was involved in almost every palace intrigue and thereby could gain power over either the sultan or one of his viziers, ministers, or other court officials.

One of the most powerful Chief Eunuchs was Beshir Agha in the 1730s, who played a crucial role in establishing the Ottoman version of Hanafi Islam throughout the Empire by founding libraries and schools.

===== Algiers =====
In the 16th century, an Englishman, Samson Rowlie, was captured and castrated to serve the Ottoman governor in Algiers.

===== Coptic involvement =====
In the 14th century, the Muslim Egyptian religious scholar Taj-al-Din Abu Nasr 'Abdal-Wahhab al-Subki discussed eunuchs in his book Kitab Mu'id al-Ni'am wa Mubid al-Niqam (Arabic: كتاب معيد النعم ومبيد النقم), a title that has been translated as Book of the Guide to [Divine] Benefits and Averting of [Divine] Vengeance and also as Book of Tutor of Graces and Annihilator of Misfortunes. In a chapter dedicated to eunuchs, Al-Subki made "the clear implication that 'eunuchness' is itself an office," Shaun Marmon explained, adding that al-Subki had specified occupational subgroups for the tawashiya [eunuchs]: the zimam watched over women, and the muqaddam al-mamalik over adolescent boys.

Edmund Andrews of Northwestern University, in an 1898 article called "Oriental Eunuchs" in The American Journal of Medicine, refers to Coptic priests in "Abou Gerhè in Upper Egypt" castrating slave boys.

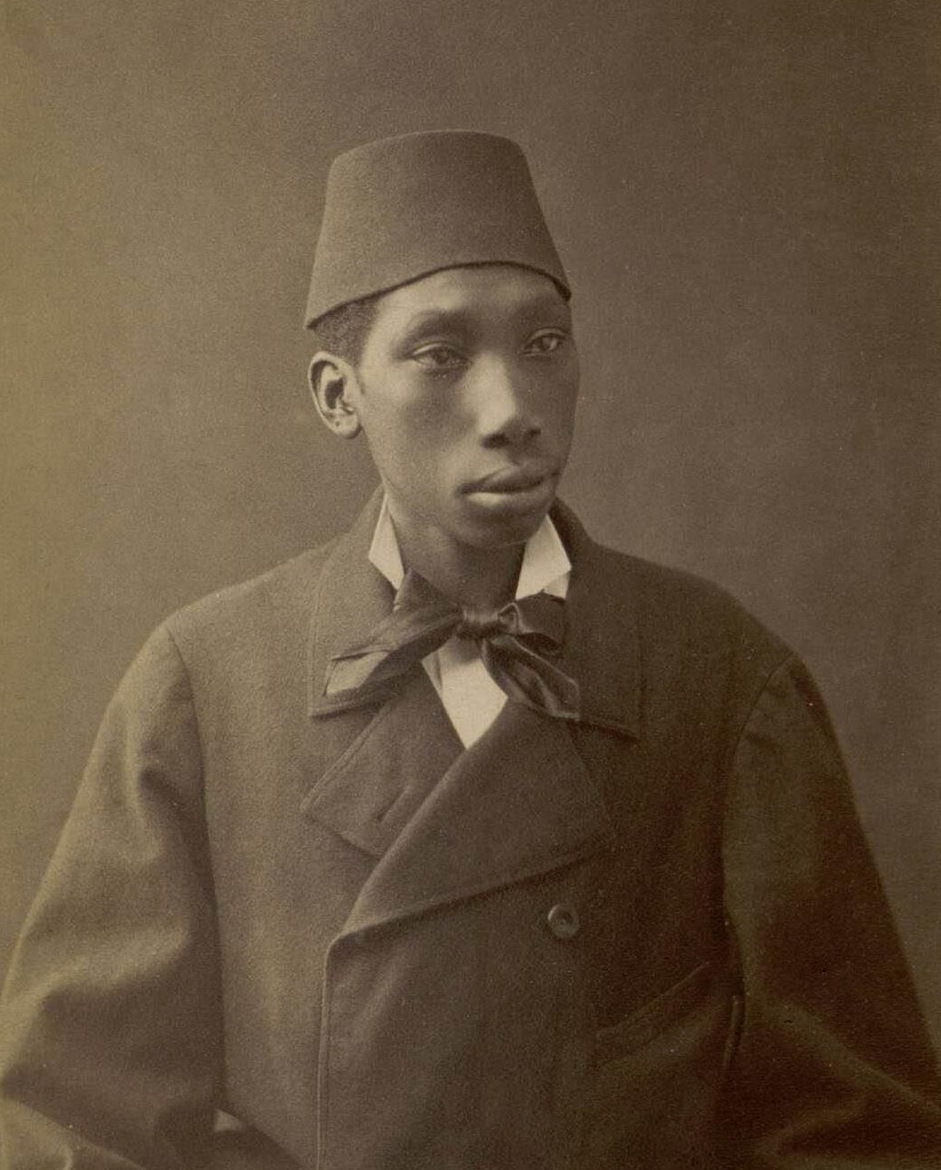
A black eunuch of the Ottoman Sultan. Photograph by Pascal Sebah, 1870s.

Coptic castration of slaves was discussed by Peter Charles Remondino, in his book History of Circumcision from the Earliest Times to the Present, published in 1900. He refers to the "Abou-Gerghè" monastery in a place he calls "Mount Ghebel-Eter". He adds details not mentioned by Andrews such as the insertion of bamboo into the victim. Bamboo was used with Chinese eunuchs. Andrews states his information is derived from an earlier work, Les Femmes, les eunuques, et les guerriers du Soudan, published by a French explorer, Count Raoul du Bisson, in 1868, though this detail does not appear in Du Bisson's book.

Remondino's claims were repeated in similar form by Henry G. Spooner in 1919, in the American Journal of Urology and Sexology. Spooner, an associate of William J. Robinson, referred to the monastery as "Abou Gerbe in Upper Egypt".

According to Remondino, Spooner, and several later sources, the Coptic priests sliced the penis and testicles off Nubian or Abyssinian slave boys around the age of eight. The boys were captured from Abyssinia and other areas in Sudan like Darfur and Kordofan, then brought into Sudan and Egypt. During the operation, the Coptic clergyman chained the boys to tables, then, after slicing off their sexual organs, stuck a piece of bamboo into the urethra and submerged them in neck-high sand under the sun. The mortality rate was said to be high. Slave traders made especially large profits off eunuchs from this region.

== Ancient Greece, Rome, and Byzantium ==
The practice was also well established in other Mediterranean areas among the Greeks and Romans, although a role as court functionary does not arise until Byzantine times. The Galli or priests of Cybele were eunuchs.

In the late period of the Roman Empire, after the adoption of the oriental royal court model by the Emperors Diocletian (r. 284–305) and Constantine (r. 306–337), emperors were surrounded by eunuchs for such functions as bathing, haircutting, dressing, and bureaucratic functions, in effect acting as a shield between the emperor and his administrators from physical contact, thus enjoying great influence in the imperial court (see Eusebius and Eutropius). Julian (r. 361–363) released the eunuchs from service because he felt they were overpaid, and he subsequently realized how much they had contributed to palace operations.

The Roman poet Martial rails against a woman who had sex with partially castrated eunuchs (those whose testicles were removed or rendered inactive only) in the bitter epigram (VI, 67): "Do you ask, Panychus, why your Caelia only consorts with eunuchs? Caelia wants the flowers of marriage – not the fruits." It is up for debate whether this passage is representative of any sort of widely practiced behavior, however.

At the Byzantine imperial court, there were a great number of eunuchs employed in domestic and administrative functions, actually organized as a separate hierarchy, following a parallel career of their own. Archieunuchs—each in charge of a group of eunuchs—were among the principal officers in Constantinople, under the emperors. Under Justinian in the 6th century, the eunuch Narses functioned as a successful general in a number of campaigns.

Advantages of eunuchs were that they prevented offices from becoming hereditary, allowing appointments to be made on merit; they were more dedicated to their jobs, not being distracted by family obligations; and they were ineligible for the throne, and for that reason thought by emperors to be safe. Those who had been deprived not only of their testicles but also their penises were known in Greek as carzimasia, and were highly prized.

== Religious castration ==
Castration as part of religious practice, and eunuchs occupying religious roles, have been established prior to classical antiquity. Archaeological finds at Çatalhöyük in Anatolia indicate worship of a 'Magna Mater' figure, a forerunner of the goddess Cybele found in later Anatolia and other parts of the near East. Later Roman followers of Cybele were called Galli, who practiced ritual self-castration, known as sanguinaria. Eunuch priests also figured prominently in the Atargatis cult in Syria during the first centuries AD.

The practice of religious castration continued into the Christian era, with members of the early church practicing celibacy (including castration) for religious purposes, although the extent and even the existence of this practice among Christians is subject to debate. The early theologian Origen found evidence of the practice in Matthew 19:10–12: "His disciples said to him, 'If such is the case of a man with his wife, it is better not to marry.' But he said to them, 'Not everyone can accept this teaching, but only those to whom it is given. For there are eunuchs who have been so from birth, and there are eunuchs who have been made eunuchs by others, and there are eunuchs who have made themselves eunuchs for the sake of the kingdom of heaven. Let anyone accept this who can.'" (NRSV)

Tertullian, a 2nd-century Church Father, described Jesus himself and Paul of Tarsus as spadones, which is translated as "eunuchs" in some contexts. Quoting from the cited book: "Tertullian takes 'spado' to mean virgin". The meaning of spado in late antiquity can be interpreted as a metaphor for celibacy. Tertullian even goes so far with the metaphor as to say St. Paul had been "castrated". Tertullian also ridiculed his theological opponent Marcion of Sinope as a eunuch who advocated for sexual abstinence.

Eunuch priests have served various goddesses from India for many centuries. Similar phenomena are exemplified by some modern Indian communities of the hijra, which are associated with a deity and with certain rituals and festivals – notably the devotees of Yellammadevi, or jogappas, who are not castrated, and the Ali of southern India, of whom at least some are.

The 18th-century Russian Skoptzy (скопцы) sect was an example of a castration cult, where its members regarded castration as a way of renouncing the sins of the flesh. Several members of the 20th-century Heaven's Gate cult were found to have been castrated, apparently voluntarily and for similar reasons.

=== In the Christian Bible ===
[6] Wherefore they are no more twain, but one flesh. What therefore God hath joined together, let not man put asunder. [7] They say unto him, Why did Moses then command to give a writing of divorcement, and to put her away? [8] He saith unto them, Moses because of the hardness of your hearts suffered you to put away your wives: but from the beginning it was not so. [9] And I say unto you, Whosoever shall put away his wife, except [it be] for fornication, and shall marry another, committeth adultery: and whoso marrieth her which is put away doth commit adultery. [10] His disciples say unto him, If the case of the man be so with [his] wife, it is not good to marry. [11] But he said unto them, All [men] cannot receive this saying, save [they] to whom it is given. [12] For there are some eunuchs, which were so born from [their] mother's womb: and there are some eunuchs, which were made eunuchs of men: and there be eunuchs, which have made themselves eunuchs for the kingdom of heaven's sake. He that is able to receive [it], let him receive [it].

— Matthew 19:6–12 KJV

The reference to "eunuchs" in Matthew 19:12 has yielded various interpretations.

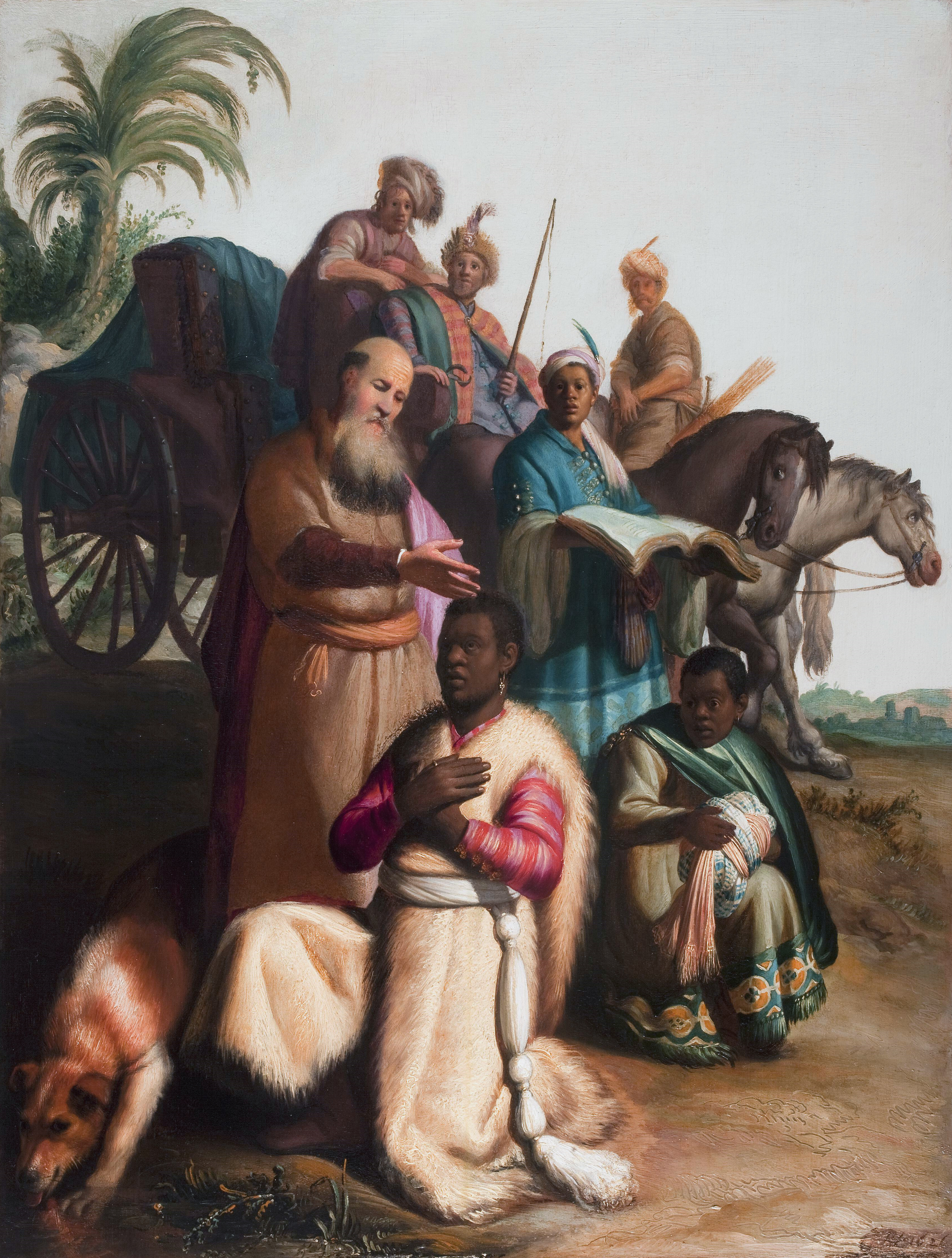
Rembrandt, The Baptism of the Eunuch, 1626

One of the earliest converts to Christianity was an Ethiopian eunuch who was a high court official of Candace, the Queen of Ethiopia, but was already a eunuch at the time of conversion (Acts 8:27–39).

In the deuterocanonical Wisdom of Solomon, the eunuch who has done no lawless deed is praised and special favor is claimed to be shown to him.

=== In Judaism ===
Eunuchs are mentioned many times in the Bible, such as in the Book of Isaiah (56:4) using the word סריס (saris). Although the Ancient Hebrews did not practice castration, eunuchs were common in other cultures featured in the Bible, such as ancient Egypt, Assyria and Babylonia, the Achaemenid Empire, and ancient Rome. In the Book of Esther, servants of the Persian harem of Ahasuerus, such as Hegai and Shashgaz, as well as other servants such as Hatach, Harbonah, Bigthan, and Teresh, are referred to as sarisim. Being exposed to the consorts of the king, they would likely have been castrated.

The Hebrew word saris (Hebrew: סָרִיס, romanized: sāris) derives from ša-rēši, the Akkadian word for eunuch, and thus has been generally understood by scholars as referring to eunuchs. However, its technical meaning is a male who has not shown signs of typical sexual maturity by the age of 20. Per the Talmud, only one known as a saris adam – a castrated male; one made sterile intentionally or via accidental injury – might be considered a eunuch (a saris ḥama is one who is congenitally sterile, and is not considered a eunuch).

== Social factors ==
The role of eunuchs in society was often dictated by social and cultural norms, as well as political necessities. For instance, eunuchs were seen as reliable because they could not produce heirs and thus were considered less likely to establish rival power bases. The practice of castration was often a means of ensuring loyalty and controlling certain populations.

== Castrato singers ==
Eunuchs castrated before puberty were also valued and trained in several cultures for their exceptional voices, which retained a childlike and other-worldly flexibility and treble pitch (an ability to sing in a high-pitched voice, akin to the pitch that a prepubescent boy can reach). Such eunuchs were known as castrati.

As women were sometimes forbidden to sing in Church, their place was taken by castrati. Castrati became very popular in 18th century opera seria. The practice, known as castratism, remained popular until the 18th century and was known into the 19th century. The last famous Italian castrato, Giovanni Battista Velluti, died in 1861. The sole existing sound recording of a castrato singer documents the voice of Alessandro Moreschi, the last eunuch in the Sistine Chapel Choir, who died in 1922.

This Italian practice of castrating young males to maintain their soprano voices was ended by Pope Leo XIII (1878).

== Modern voluntary eunuchs ==
Some men, especially in the West, have voluntarily become eunuchs in recent decades due to various motives. This has sometimes, but not always, included a full penectomy in addition to a bilateral orchiectomy, in which case the specific eunuch is also known as a nullo.

== Notable eunuchs ==
In chronological order.

=== First millennium BCE ===
- Mutakkil-Marduk (8th century BCE): chief eunuch of the Middle Assyrian Empire and eponym of the year 798 BCE in an Assyrian eponym chronicle.
- Yariri (8th century BCE): regent of the Syro-Hittite state of Carchemish thought likely to be a eunuch.
- Sîn-šumu-līšir (7th century BCE): eunuch who attempted to usurp power in the Neo-Assyrian Empire.
- Aspamistres or Mithridates, 5th century BCE: bodyguard of Xerxes I, and, with Artabanus, his murderer.
- Artoxares: (5th century BCE) an envoy of Artaxerxes I and Darius II of Persia.
- Bagoas (4th century BCE): prime minister of king Artaxerxes III of Persia, and his assassin (Bagoas is an old Persian word meaning eunuch).
- Bagoas (4th century BCE): a favorite of Alexander the Great.
- Batis (4th century BCE): resisted Alexander the Great at the Siege of Gaza (332 BCE).
- Philetaerus (4th/3rd century BCE): founder of the Kingdom of Pergamon
- Zhao Gao (died 210 BCE): favourite of Qin Shi Huang who plotted against Li Si.
- Sima Qian (old romanization Ssu-ma Chi'en; 2nd/1st century BCE): the first person to have practiced modern historiography – gathering and analyzing both primary and secondary sources to write his monumental history of the Chinese Empire.
- Ganymedes (1st century BCE): highly capable adviser and general of Cleopatra VII's sister and rival, Princess Arsinoe IV. Unsuccessfully attacked Julius Caesar three times at Alexandria.
- Pothinus (1st century BCE): regent for pharaoh Ptolemy XIII.

=== First millennium CE ===
- Sporus (died 69): an attractive Roman boy who was castrated by, and later married to, Emperor Nero.
- Unidentified "Ethiopian eunuch" (1st century AD), from the Kingdom of Kush in modern-day Sudan, described in the Acts of the Apostles (chapter 8). Philip the Evangelist, one of the original seven deacons, is directed by the Holy Spirit to catch up to the eunuch's chariot and hears him reading from the Book of Isaiah (chapter 53). Philip explained that the section prophesies Jesus' crucifixion, which Philip described to the eunuch. The eunuch was baptized shortly thereafter.
- Halotus (c. 20–30 CE – c. 70–80 CE), servant to the Roman Emperor Claudius and suspected of poisoning him.
- Cai Lun (c. 50–62–121): former attribution to Lun as the inventor of paper has been rescinded following discovery of many earlier manuscripts written on paper. It is now highly questionable if he was directly involved in making paper.
- Zhang Rang (2nd Century): head of the infamous Ten Attendants of the Eastern Han dynasty.
- Huang Hao (3rd Century): eunuch in the state of Shu; also appears in the Romance of the Three Kingdoms.
- Cen Hun (died 280): eunuch in the state of Wu during the Three Kingdoms period.
- Origen (c. 185–c. 253): early Christian theologian, allegedly castrated himself based on his reading of the Gospel of Matthew 19:12 ("For there are eunuchs, who were born so from their mother's womb: and there are eunuchs, who were made so by men: and there are eunuchs, who have made themselves eunuchs for the kingdom of heaven. He that can take, let him take it."). Despite the fact that the early Christian theologian Tertullian wrote that Jesus was a eunuch, there is no corroboration in any other early source. The Skoptsy did, however, believe it to be true.
- Chusdazat (died 344): served King Shapur II, who killed him for declaring his Christian identity.
- Dorotheus of Tyre (255–362): a bishop who attended the Council of Nicaea, was exiled by Diocletian and Julian, and was martyred.
- Eutropius (died 399): only eunuch known to have attained the highly distinguished office of Roman Consul.
- Chrysaphius (died 450): chief minister of Eastern Roman Emperor Theodosius II, architect of imperial policy towards the Huns.
- Narses (478–573): general of Byzantine emperor Justinian I, responsible for destroying the Ostrogoths in 552 at the Battle of Taginae in Italy and reconquering Rome for the empire.
- Solomon (480s/490s–544): general and governor of Africa under Justinian I.
- Gao Lishi (684–762): a loyal and trusted friend of Tang emperor Xuanzong.
- Li Fuguo (704–762): Tang eunuch who began another era of eunuch rule.
- Yu Chao'en (722–770): Tang eunuch who began his career as army supervisor.
- Staurakios (died 800): chief associate and minister of the Byzantine empress Irene of Athens.
- Ignatius of Constantinople (799–877): twice Patriarch of Constantinople during troubled political times (847–858 and 867–877). First absolutely unquestioned eunuch saint, recognized by both the Orthodox and Roman Churches (there are a great many early saints who were probably eunuchs, though few either as influential nor unquestioned as to their castration).
- Yazaman al-Khadim (died 891): Emir of Tarsus and successful commander in the wars against the Byzantine Empire.
- Mu'nis al-Muzaffar (845/846–933/934): commander-in-chief of the Abbasid armies between 908 and his death.
- Joseph Bringas (died 965): chief minister of the Byzantine Empire under Romanos II (959–963).
- Abu al-Misk Kafur (died 968): de facto ruler of Ikhshidid Egypt and Syria (946-968).

=== Second millennium CE ===
- Jia Xian (c. 1010–c. 1070): Chinese mathematician; invented the Jia Xian triangle for the calculation of square roots and cube roots.
- Lý Thường Kiệt (1019–1105): general during the Lý dynasty in Vietnam. Penned what is considered the first Vietnamese declaration of independence. Regarded as a Vietnamese national hero.
- Tatikios (c. 1048–after 1110): Byzantine general who led the forces of Emperor Alexios I Komnenos and acted as a guide during the First Crusade.
- Pierre Abélard (1079–1142): French scholastic philosopher and theologian. Forcibly castrated by his girlfriend's uncle while in bed.
- Lu'lu' al-Yaya (died 1117): regent of the Seljuk sultanate of Aleppo.
- Malik Kafur (fl. 1296–1316): a eunuch slave who became a general in the army of Alauddin Khalji, ruler of the Delhi sultanate.
- Zheng He (1371–1433): famous admiral who led huge Chinese fleets of exploration around the Indian Ocean.
- Yishiha (15th century): admiral in charge of expeditions down the Amur River under the Yongle and Xuande Emperors.
- Wu Rui (15th century): a Chinese eunuch in Lê dynasty Annam (Vietnam).
- Gang Bing (died 1410): patron saint of eunuchs in China who castrated himself to demonstrate his loyalty to the Yongle Emperor.
- Wang Zhen (died 1449): first Ming eunuch with much power; see Tumu Crisis.
- Kim Cheo Seon (1421–1505): one of the most famous eunuchs during the Korean Joseon dynasty period, ably served kings in the Joseon dynasty. His life is the subject of a historical drama in South Korea.
- Liu Jin (1451–1510): corrupt eunuch official of the Ming dynasty and de facto emperor, member of the Eight Tigers.
- Murad Agha (c. 1480–c. 1556): a Sicilian-born Ottoman eunuch and military officer who was the first Beylerbey of Tripoli.
- Judar Pasha (1562–1606): a Spanish eunuch who became the head of the Moroccan invasion force into the Songhai Empire.
- Wei Zhongxian (1568–1627): eunuch of the Ming dynasty, considered the most powerful eunuch in Chinese history.
- Senesino (1686–1758): Italian contralto castrato singer.
- Farinelli (1705–1782): Italian soprano castrato singer.
- Giusto Fernando Tenducci (c. 1736–1790): Italian soprano castrato singer.
- Agha Mohammad Khan Qajar (1742–1797): chief of the Qajars who founded the Qajar dynasty and established Qajar Iran in 1789.
- Lê Văn Duyệt (c. 1763–1832): Vietnamese eunuch, military strategist and government official (not a true eunuch, he was intersex).
- Manuchehr Khan Gorji, (1790s–1847) a statesman of Fath-Ali Shah and Mohammad Shah of Qajar Iran. He was the governor of Isfahan when Báb sought refuge there.
- Thomas P. "Boston" Corbett (b. 1832; presumed dead 1894): killer of John Wilkes Booth, the assassin of Abraham Lincoln, who castrated himself to avoid temptation from prostitutes.
- Li Lianying (1848–1911): a despotic eunuch of the Qing dynasty.
- Alessandro Moreschi (1858–1922): Italian castrato singer, the only one to make recordings.
- Xin Xiuming (1878–1959): Entered Emperor Puyi's service in 1902; left palace service in 1911; became abbot of the Taoist temple at the Babaoshan Revolutionary Cemetery by 1930; wrote memoir Eunuch's Recollection (老太监的回忆).
- Sun Yaoting (1902–1996): last surviving imperial eunuch of Chinese history.

== See also ==
- Eunuchs in popular culture
- Nullification (body modification)
