= Brentano =

Brentano is an Italian surname. Notable people with the surname include:

- Antonie Brentano, philanthropist
- August Brentano, bookseller
- Bernard von Brentano, novelist
- Christian Brentano, German writer
- Clemens Brentano, poet and novelist
- Franz Brentano, philosopher
- Franz Funck-Brentano, French historian and librarian
- Heinrich von Brentano di Tremezzo, German politician
- Lorenzo Brentano, politician
- Lujo Brentano, economist, reformer
- Marianne Ehrmann-Brentano, novelist
- Robert Brentano, American historian
- Theodore Brentano, American attorney, judge, and diplomat, son of Lorenzo
- Théophile Funck-Brentano, Luxembourgish-French sociologist

== See also ==
- Brentano's is a bookstore chain owned by Borders Group.
- Brenton
