= Melville Davisson Post =

American author

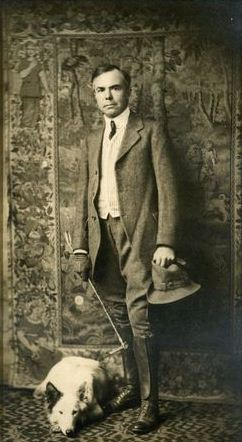
- About 1919
- Born: April 19, 1869; Harrison County, West Virginia, US
- Died: June 23, 1930 (aged 61); Harrison County, West Virginia, US
- Occupations: Author, lawyer
- Writing career
- Genre: Mystery
- Notable work: Uncle Abner mysteries, Randolph Mason stories

Melville Davisson Post (April 19, 1869 – June 23, 1930) was an American writer, born in Harrison County, West Virginia. Although his name is not immediately familiar to those outside of specialist circles, many of his collections are still in print, and many collections of detective fiction include works by him. Post's best-known character is the mystery solving, justice dispensing West Virginian backwoodsman, Uncle Abner. The 22 Uncle Abner tales, written between 1911 and 1928, have been called some of "the finest mysteries ever written".

Post's other recurring characters include the lawyers Randolph Mason and Colonel Braxton, and the detectives Sir Henry Marquis and Monsieur Jonquelle. His total output was approximately 230 titles, including several non-crime novels.

== Biography ==
=== Early life and education ===
Post was born on 19 April 1869 in Harrison County, West Virginia, the son of Ira Carper Post, a wealthy farmer; his mother was Florence May (née Davisson). Post's family had settled in the Clarksburg, West Virginia area in the late 18th century.

=== Career ===
Post earned a law degree from West Virginia University in 1892 and was elected the same year as the youngest member of the Electoral College. He practiced law with a firm in Wheeling, West Virginia but became uninterested in politics, instead concentrating on writing. His first published Uncle Abner story was in 1911, and they appeared in newspapers throughout the country. His collection of Uncle Abner stories was first printed in 1918 and remained in print (at its original price) for two decades, which Craig Johnson believes made him the highest paid and most commercially published author of that time. Collier Books reprinted the stories in 1962 and the University of California Press in 1974.

=== Personal life ===
In 1903, he married Ann Bloomfield Gamble Schofield. Their only child (a son, Ira) died in infancy, after which Melville and Ann travelled in Europe. They later owned and managed a stable for polo ponies. Ann died of pneumonia in 1919.

=== Death ===
Post, an avid horseman, died on June 23, 1930, after falling from his horse at age 61. He had published 230 titles, most of them crime fiction. He is buried in Elkview Masonic cemetery in Harrison County.

== Legacy ==
Post's boyhood home, "Templemoor", was listed on the National Register of Historic Places in 1982.

== Fiction ==
=== Randolph Mason ===
Post wrote three volumes of stories about Randolph Mason, a brusque New York lawyer who is highly skilled at turning legal loopholes and technicalities to his clients' advantage.

In the first two volumes (The Strange Schemes of Randolph Mason and The Man of Last Resort, published 1896–1897), Mason is depicted as an utterly amoral character who advises criminals how to commit wrongdoings without breaking the letter of the law. The best-known of these stories is "The Corpus Delicti", in which Mason's client murders a blackmailing lover and dissolves her dismembered corpse in acid. Despite overwhelming circumstantial evidence, Mason secures his client's acquittal on the grounds that no body has been found and there are no eyewitnesses to the woman's death. (New York law at the time allowed one of these two conditions to be established by circumstantial evidence, but not both.) Post deflected criticism of such sensational stories by declaring that he was publicly exposing weaknesses in the law that needed to be rectified. Nevertheless, in a third volume (1908's The Corrector of Destinies), Mason had become a reformed man who used his knowledge of the law for more beneficent purposes. Post explained Mason's change of character by stating the lawyer had been suffering from mental illness in the two earlier volumes.

=== Uncle Abner ===
Post's best known creation is Uncle Abner, an 1840s West Virginia woodsman. The stories are considered classics of the impossible mystery genre, and pioneers of the historical mystery type.

=== Other characters ===
Besides Mason, Abner, and Walker, Post also created the detectives Sir Henry Marquis of Scotland Yard (The Sleuth of St James Square, 1920), the French policeman Monsieur Jonquelle (Monsieur Jonquelle: Prefect of Police of Paris, 1923), and the Virginia lawyer Colonel Braxton (The Silent Witness, 1930).

== Bibliography ==
- The Strange Schemes of Randolph Mason (Putnam, 1896) (available from Internet Archive)
- The Man of Last Resort (The Clients of Randolph Mason) (Putnam, 1897) (available from Internet Archive)
- Dwellers in the Hills (Putnam, 1901) (available from Project Gutenberg)
- The Corrector of Destinies (Clode, 1908) (available from Internet Archive)
- The Gilded Chair (Appleton, 1910) (available from Internet Archive)
- The Nameless Thing (Appleton, 1912)
- Uncle Abner: Master of Mysteries (Appleton, 1918) (available from Wikisource)
- The Mystery at the Blue Villa (Appleton, 1919)
- The Sleuth of St. James Square (Appleton, 1920) (available from Project Gutenberg)
- The Mountain School-Teacher (Appleton, 1922) (available from Internet Archive)
- Monsieur Jonquelle (Appleton, 1923). Originally serialised in a US newspaper under the title Triumphs of M Jonquelle
- Walker of the Secret Service (Appleton, 1924)
- The Man Hunters (Sears, 1926)
- Revolt of the Birds (Appleton, 1927)
- The Bradmoor Murder (Sears, 1929). Published in Britain in 1929 as The Garden in Asia by Brentano
- The Silent Witness (Farrar, 1930)
- The Methods of Uncle Abner (published posthumously by Aspen in 1974)

=== Non-fiction ===
- German War Ciphers. Everybody's, June 1918
