= Uncle Abner =

- First appearance: "The Angel of the Lord"
- Created by: Melville Davisson Post

In-universe information
- Gender: Male
- Family: Martin (nephew)
- Nationality: American

Uncle Abner is a fictional character and the protagonist of a series of mystery stories by author Melville Davisson Post. The Abner stories, which first began appearing in 1911, are considered benchmarks of the locked room mystery. Set in the 1840s, they are among the earliest examples of the historical mystery sub-genre.

== Overview ==
Uncle Abner is Post's best-known literary creation, the character, one of six detectives created by Post, having appeared in 22 stories that were serialized in American magazines (primarily The Saturday Evening Post) between 1911 and 1928. The first tale, "The Angel of the Lord", is perhaps the very first work in the historical mystery genre. Uncle Abner solved the mysteries that confronted him in a backwoods West Virginia community, immediately prior to the American Civil War and before the infant nation had any proper police system. He had two great attributes for his self-imposed task: a profound knowledge of and love for the Bible, and a keen observation of human actions. One example of Uncle Abner's keen deductive skills is his showing a deaf man had not written a document, because a word in it was phonetically misspelled.

Physically, Abner is described as having a large, powerful build, with craggy features, and a "grizzled" beard. His clothing is described as "plain and somber". Throughout the stories he is accompanied by his young nephew Martin, who narrates the adventures, and aided by Justice of the Peace, Squire Randolph.

== Reception ==
Ellery Queen would later call the stories "an out-of-this-world target for future detective-story writers." Queen also opined that Uncle Abner was the greatest fictional detective of all time. In his 1924 book of literary criticism Cargoes for Crusoes, Grant Overton called the publication of Post's "The Doomdorf Mystery" a "major literary event", and in Murder for Pleasure (1941), Howard Haycraft called Uncle Abner "the greatest American contribution" to the list of fictional detectives after Edgar Allan Poe's C. Auguste Dupin. After Post's death, more stories about Abner were written (at the request of the Melville Davisson Post estate) by the retired American research chemist, John F. Suter (1914–1996).

== Appearances ==
1. The Angel of the Lord
2. The Wrong Hand
3. The House of the Dead Man
4. The Tenth Commandment
5. The Devil's Tools
6. A Twilight Adventure
7. The Hidden Law
8. The Riddle
9. An Act of God
10. Naboth's Vineyard
11. The Doomdorf Mystery
12. The Treasure Hunter
13. The Age of Miracles
14. The Adopted Daughter
15. The Straw Man
16. The Edge of the Shadow
17. The Mystery of Chance
18. The Concealed Path
19. The Devil's Track
20. The God of the Hills
21. The Dark Night
22. The Mystery at Hillhouse

== Adaptations ==
In 1942, The Age of Miracles was adapted for the radio anthology series Murder Clinic. A. Winfield Hoeny played Abner. In 1945, Signature, a stage adaptation by Elizabeth McFadden of an Abner short story, Naboth's Vineyard, lasted only two performances. Abner was played by Judson Laire.
