= Jewish Museum of Hohenems =

Museum in Austria

Jewish Museum of Hohenems (JMH)
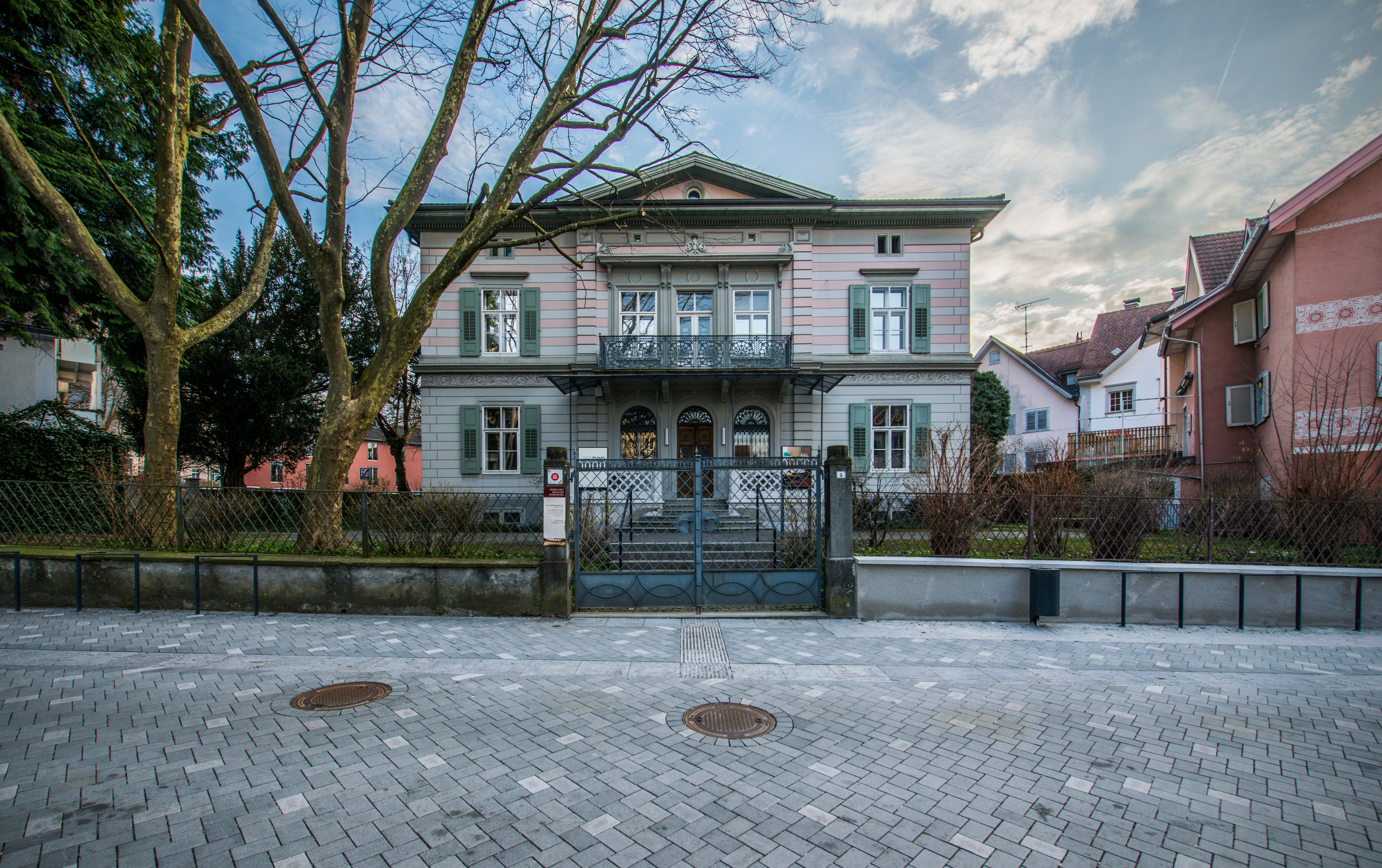
- Jüdisches Museum Hohenems (JMH)
- Established: 1991
- Location: Hohenems, Vorarlberg, Austria
- Type: History
- Director: Dr. Hanno Loewy

The Jewish Museum Hohenems (German: Jüdisches Museum Hohenems, abbreviation JMH) is a regional museum in Hohenems in the Austrian state of Vorarlberg. The museum deals with the Jewish presence in Hohenems as well as surrounding regions. It also covers the Diaspora and Israel and puts the future of the European immigration society into focus.

The destruction of the Jewish community of Hohenems via expulsion and deportation – see Antisemitism in Austria – and the Shoah are one of the museum's main topics. Besides the regional and global history, the museum is dedicated to the Jews and their stories. Each year, the museum offers a different temporary exhibition and an extensive event program.

Since there is no longer a Jewish community in Hohenems, the museum's imparting of knowledge and communication must largely be made by non-Jews.

== The building ==
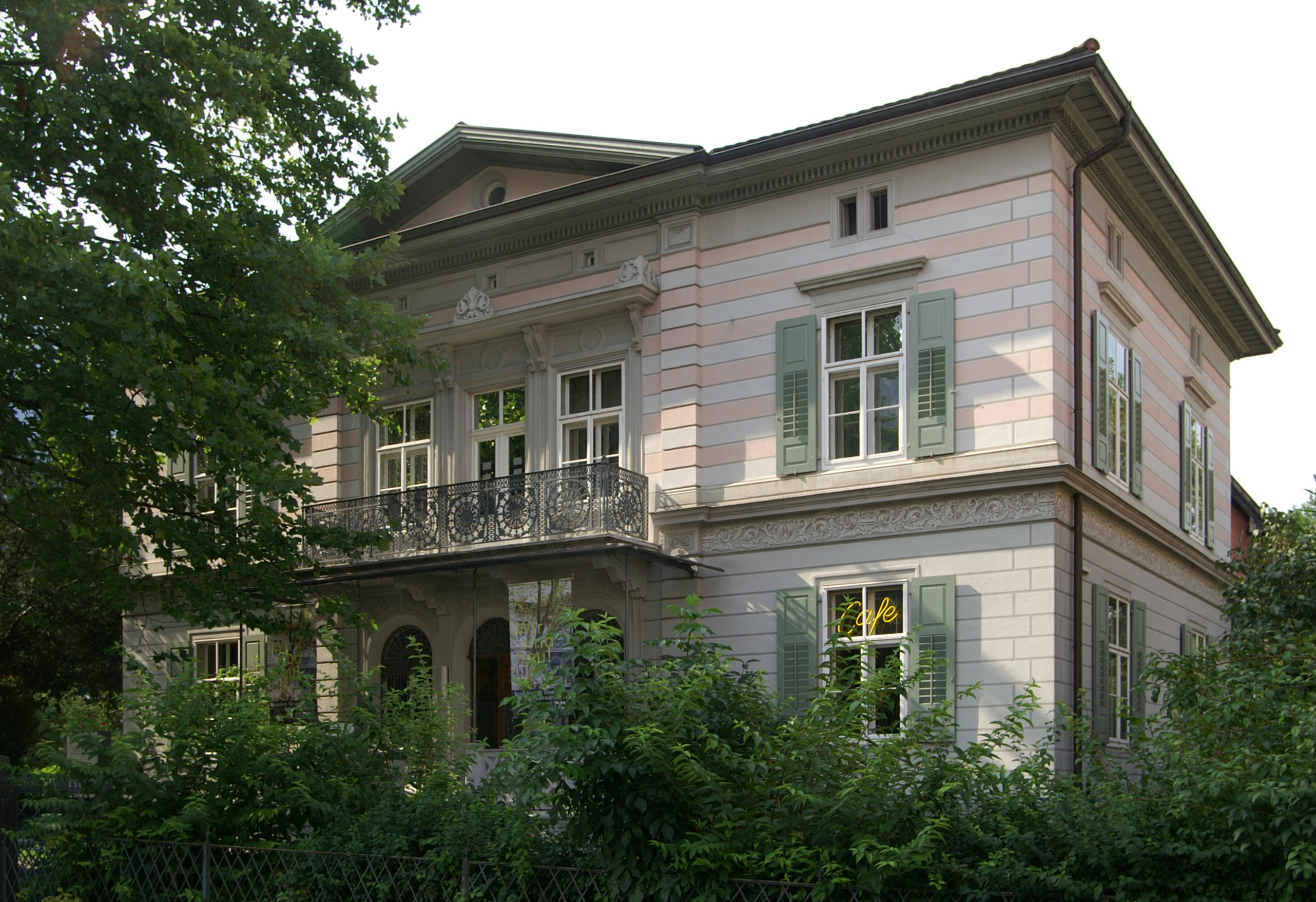
The Villa Heimann-Rosenthal

The Jewish Museum Hohenems was opened in April 1991 and is housed in the Villa Heimann-Rosenthal in the heart of the former Jewish quarter. The villa of the Rosenthal family dates back to 1864 and can – now that it hosts the JMH – be perceived as an exhibit itself.

== History of the Jewish community in Hohenems ==
In order to economically incentivise the small market town of Hohenems, Count Kaspar created the legal basis for the settlement of Jewish families in 1617. His goal was to make Hohenems' economy flourish through Jewish traders, servants, merchants and craftsmen. The rich community established a synagogue, a school, a care centre for the elderly and poor, and a mikveh. Demographically, the community reached their peak the first half of the 19th century and became a hub of their own Diaspora in and around the Alps, in Southern, Middle and Western Europe and in the US.

Due to the Austrian constitution of 1867, Jewish citizens were allowed to choose their place of residence freely. The Swiss constitution of 1866 granted them similar rights, so many members of the Jewish community of Hohenems decided to migrate to larger cities in Austria and Switzerland. By 1935, there were 16 Jewish citizens left in Hohenems. This small group was expropriated by the municipality in 1938 as a consequence of the Nazi regime. In 1940, the remaining Jewish citizens of Hohenems were dispersed by force. Some of them were deported to Vienna and later put into concentration camps in Eastern Europe. Some survivors of the concentration camps (so-called Displaced Persons) were accommodated in Hohenems by French occupying forces after the war.

== Exhibitions ==
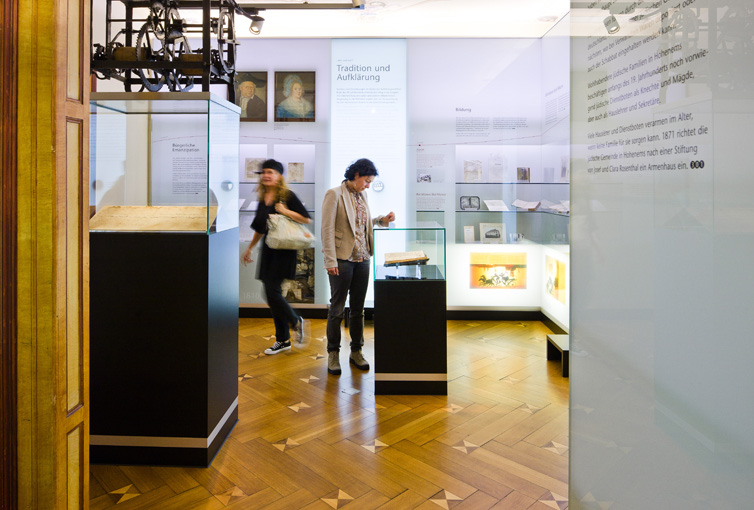
Exhibition in the Jewish Museum of Hohenems

The permanent exhibition "From the Middle Ages to the Present" was completely redesigned in 2007. It focuses on the Jewish community from its beginnings in the 17th century to the end after 1938, putting Jewish people and their personal lives in the centre of attention. In addition, there is an exhibition for children.

Since the opening of the museum, a large collection of everyday objects and personal documents has been created in cooperation with the descendants of Jews from Hohenems all over the world and through multiple donations.

=== Past temporary exhibitions ===
- Say Shibboleth!
- The Female Side of God
- Odd.
- Susan Philipsz – Night and Fog
- The First Europeans

== See also ==
- History of the Jews in Innsbruck
