= Hohenems =

Hohenems Ems
- Municipality
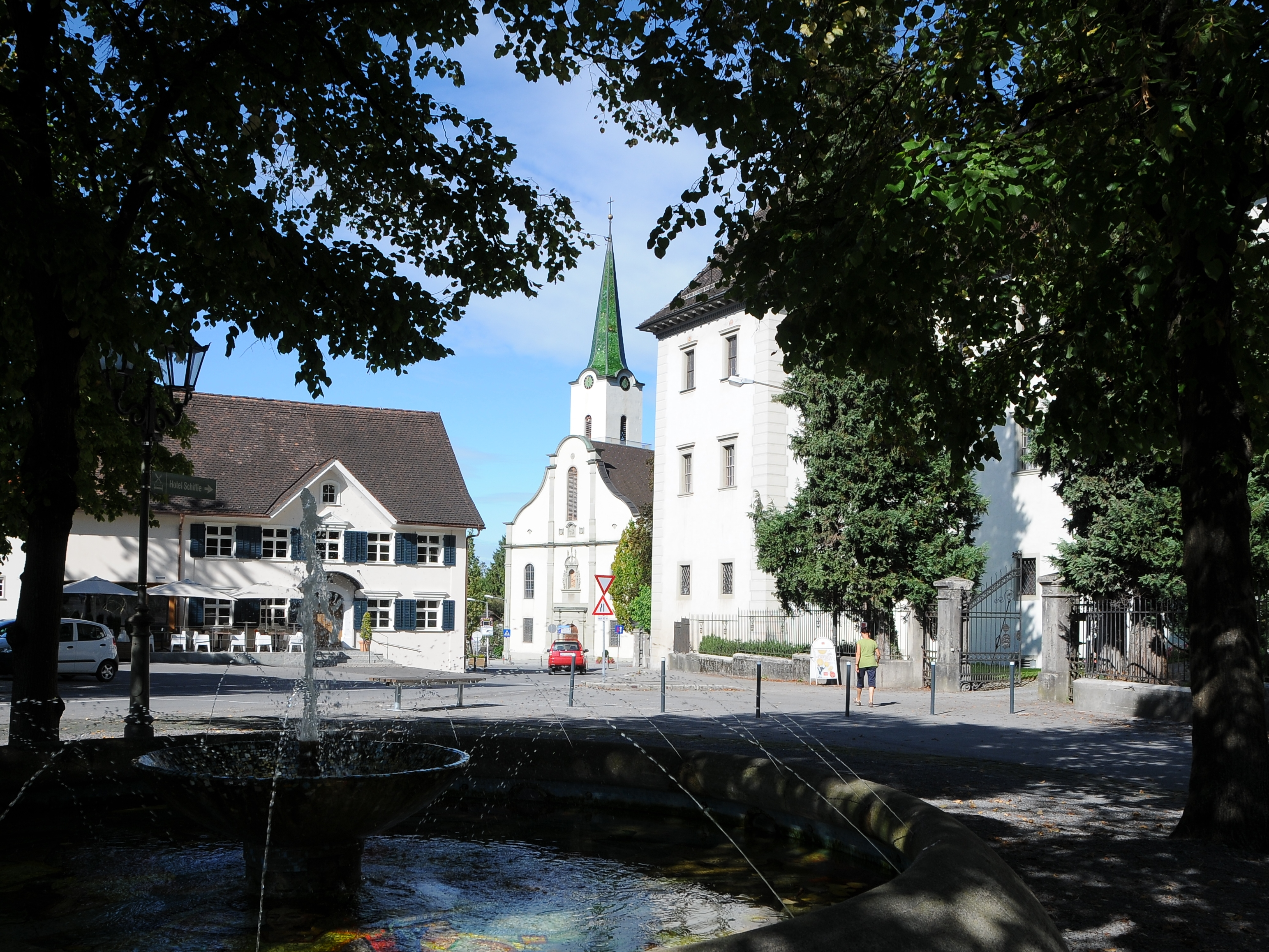
- Town centre

- Coat of arms

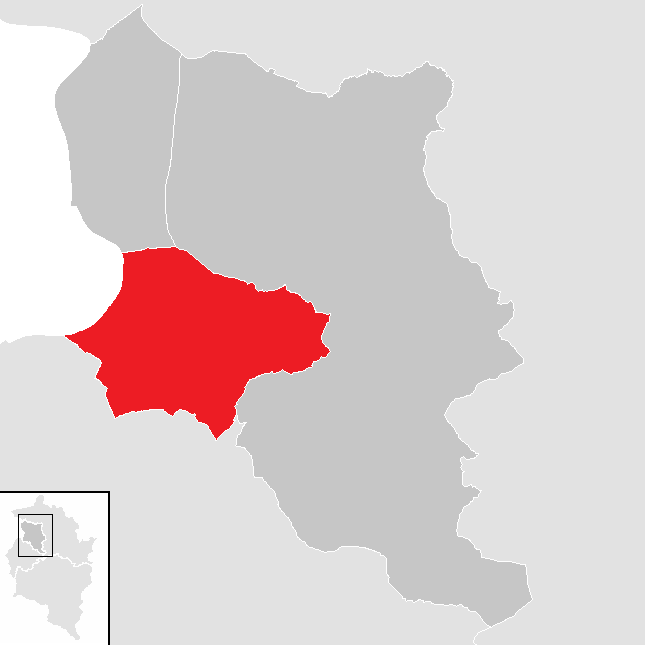
- Location within Dornbirn district

- Location within Austria
- Coordinates: 47°22′00″N 09°40′00″E
- Country: Austria
- Province: Vorarlberg
- District: Dornbirn

Government
  - Mayor: Dieter Egger (FPÖ)

Area
  - Total: 29.17 km^{2} (11.26 sq mi)
- Elevation: 432 m (1,417 ft)

Population (2023-01-01)
  - Total: 16,946
  - Density: 580.9/km^{2} (1,505/sq mi)
- Time zone: UTC+1 (CET)
  - Summer (DST): UTC+2 (CEST)
- Postal code: 6845
- Area code: 05576
- Vehicle registration: DO
- Website: www.hohenems.at

Hohenems (High Alemannic: Ems) is a town in the Austrian province of Vorarlberg in the Dornbirn district. It lies in the middle of the Austrian part of the Rhine valley. With a population of 16,946, it is the fifth largest municipality in Vorarlberg and currently has the fastest population growth in the state. Hohenems' attractions include a Renaissance palace dating back to the 16th century, a Jewish history museum, and the old town center.

== Geography ==
The town is located at 432 metres (1,417 feet) above sea level, about 16 km (10 miles) south of Lake Constance. Hohenems extends for 5.5 km (3.4 mi) from north to south and 8.2 km (5.1 mi) from west to east. Its total area is 29 square kilometres (11 sq mi), of which 42% is covered with forest. The oxbow lake of the river Rhine in the west, forming the border of Austria as well as EU to Switzerland, and the mountainside in the east is at the narrowest point of the Austrian Rhine valley. The Schlossberg ("castle mountain"), elevation 740 metres (2,428 feet), offers a distinctive backdrop to the town center.

Hohenems is divided into the neighborhoods of Markt (centre), Oberklien and Unterklien (north), Hohenems-Reute (east), Schwefel (south) and Herrenried (west). It is surrounded by six other communities, Lustenau and Dornbirn in the Dornbirn district (north and east), Fraxern, Götzis and Altach in the Feldkirch district (south) and Diepoldsau in the Swiss canton St. Gallen (west).

== History ==
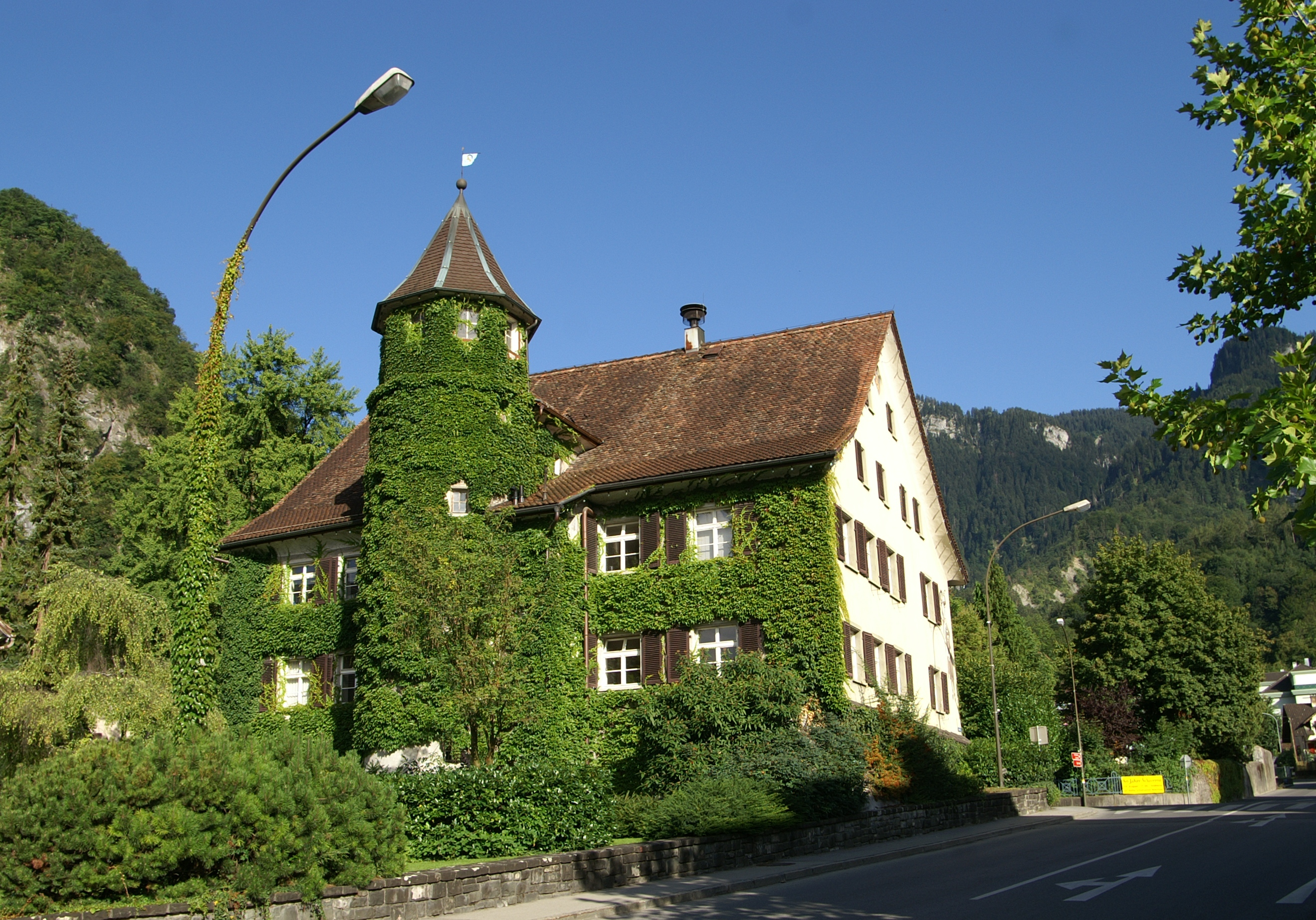
Town hall, built in 1567 as lordly guesthouse

The summit of the Schlossberg rock, within 45 minutes walk from the town center, is crowned by the ruins of Alt-Ems, a castle dating back to the 9th century CE. From the 12th century it was among the largest fortifications in the south of the German kingdom. The stronghold was very extensive, with a length of up to 800 m (2,625 ft) and a width of 85 m (280 ft). It reached its peak of fame from the 13th to 16th centuries, as a residence of many lords and knights of Hohenems. As they were loyal ministeriales of the Hohenstaufen dynasty, the castle served as a prison for notable prisoners like the Norman king William III of Sicily, who probably died there in 1198.

Hohenems was granted municipal rights and liberties (German Stadtrecht) in 1333, but the town did not make use of these rights for 650 years until, in 1983, the government of Vorarlberg granted Hohenems full status as a "municipality".

The Burg Neu-Ems (also called "Schloss Glopper"), built in 1343, is located on a mountain promontory near Alt-Ems. In 1407 both castles were destroyed during the Appenzell Wars, but rebuilt shortly afterwards. Burg Neu-Ems is still intact today and is the private property of the Waldburg-Zeil family.

The Renaissance palace in the centre of Hohenems, owned by the Counts of Waldburg-Zeil-Hohenems

The Renaissance palace stands at the foot of the Schlossberg and dominates the main square of town, the Schlossplatz. It was built from 1562 to 1567, according to plans by architect Martino Longhi the Elder at the initiative of Cardinal Marcus Sittich Hohenems (Altemps), architect who also designed the Cardinal’s palace in Rome. Religious wars and a plague decimated the population and devastated the area over the next century, ironically the time of the greatest power of the (Protestant) Counts of Hohenems, when they acquired Vaduz Castle from what was later to become Liechtenstein. Two manuscripts of the Nibelungenlied were found in Hohenems, in 1755 and 1779, in the palace's library.

The first café (1797), bank and printing office (1920) of Vorarlberg were opened in Hohenems.

=== Jewish heritage ===
The Jewish community in Hohenems had its beginnings with a charter in 1617. Soon thereafter a synagogue, a ritual bath (mikvah), a school and a poorhouse were built. A cemetery was established on the southern outskirts of town. Jewish economic activity in the town resulted in the first coffee house in 1797, and in 1841, the first bank and insurance company in Vorarlberg. The Hohenems Jewish community celebrated its golden era around 1862, with nearly 600 Jewish citizens, 12% of the population. The Jewish presence in town was terminated in 1942 with the deportation of the last remaining Jew, Frieda Nagelberg, to Vienna and eventually to Izbica. Recently three Jewish people have moved into Hohenems.

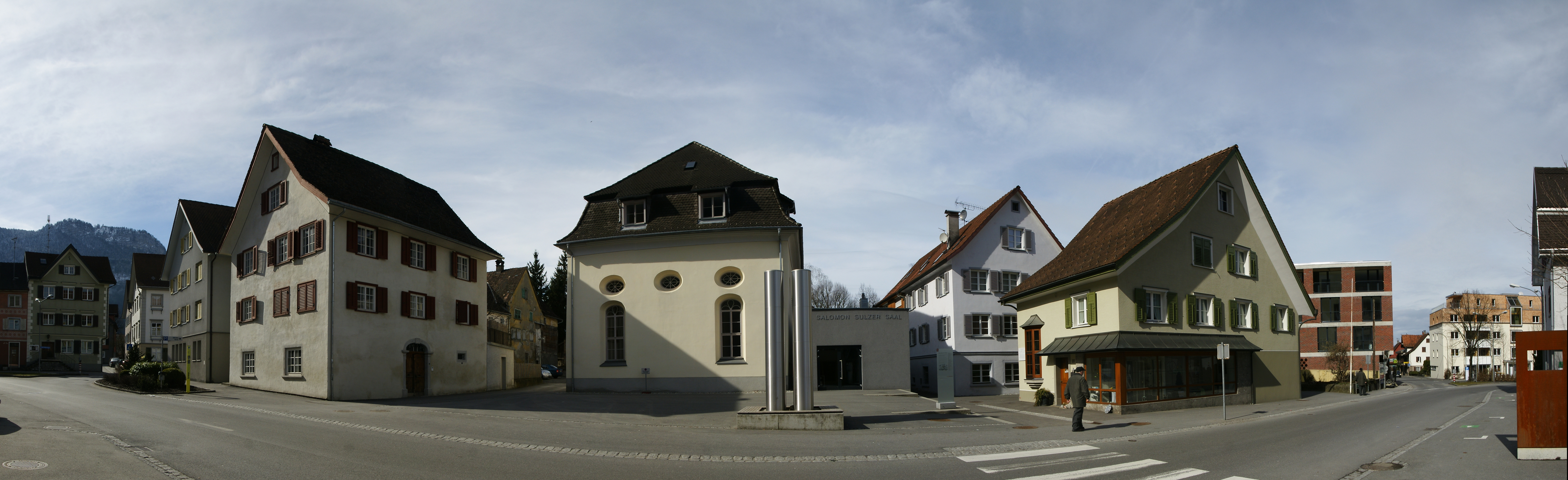
A part of the Jewish quarter with the former synagogue

The synagogue survived the Kristallnacht without damage. It was acquired by the municipality after the war and converted into a fire station. All objects pertaining to its use as a synagogue were removed or destroyed. In 2001 the synagogue was renovated and it now used as a cultural centre. The Jewish quarter, which has had historical preservation status since 1996, includes numerous townhouses and mansions surrounding the synagogue. Along with the former Christengasse ("Christian Lane"), renamed Marktstrasse (Market Street), it forms the urban core of Hohenems.

In 1991, the Jewish Museum Hohenems was opened in a mansion in the center of the Jewish quarter. The museum commemorates the history of the Jewish community in Hohenems. The many remaining objects it exhibits bear witness to the former flourishing Jewish community in Hohenems. As part of its remembrance culture, a section of the museum is dedicated to the memory of the darkest chapter in Vorarlberg history – the national socialist period, and its attempts to eliminate all traces of Jewish culture in Vorarlberg and beyond. The Jewish cemetery south of the town dates to the first Jewish settlement in 1617 and is still in use today. It contains more than 500 graves, with 370 surviving gravestones.

== Mayors ==
2004–2015: Richard Amann

Since December 2015: Dieter Egger (born 1969)

== Population ==
Historical population
Year	Pop.	±%
1869	4,191	—
1880	4,428	+5.7%
1890	4,972	+12.3%
1900	5,652	+13.7%
1910	6,456	+14.2%
1923	5,153	−20.2%
1934	5,514	+7.0%
1939	5,734	+4.0%
1951	6,990	+21.9%
1961	9,188	+31.4%
1971	11,487	+25.0%
1981	12,666	+10.3%
1991	13,531	+6.8%
2001	13,891	+2.7%
2011	15,149	+9.1%

Largest groups of foreign residents
Nationality	Population (2025)
Turkey	1,074
Germany	651
Romania	283
Serbia	224
Syria	191
Hungary	180
Croatia	134
Bosnia and Herzegovina	126
Ukraine	104
Bulgaria	97
Afghanistan	84
Slovakia	81
Italy	65
Poland	50
Slovenia	45
Russian Federation	45
Kosovo	33
North Macedonia	31
Iraq	28
Czech Republic	12
Iran	7

== Infrastructure ==
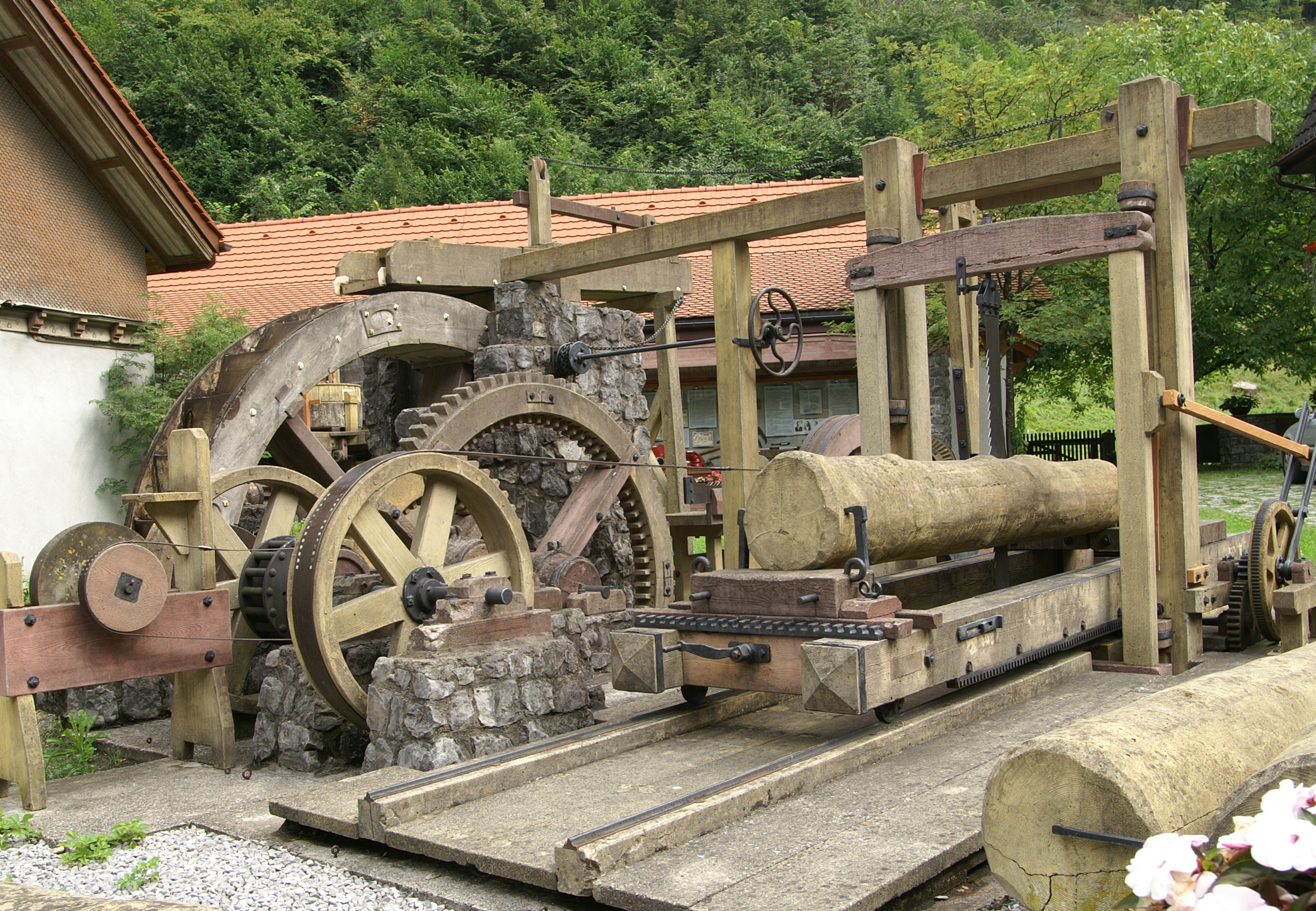
Exhibit in "Stoffel's sawmill"

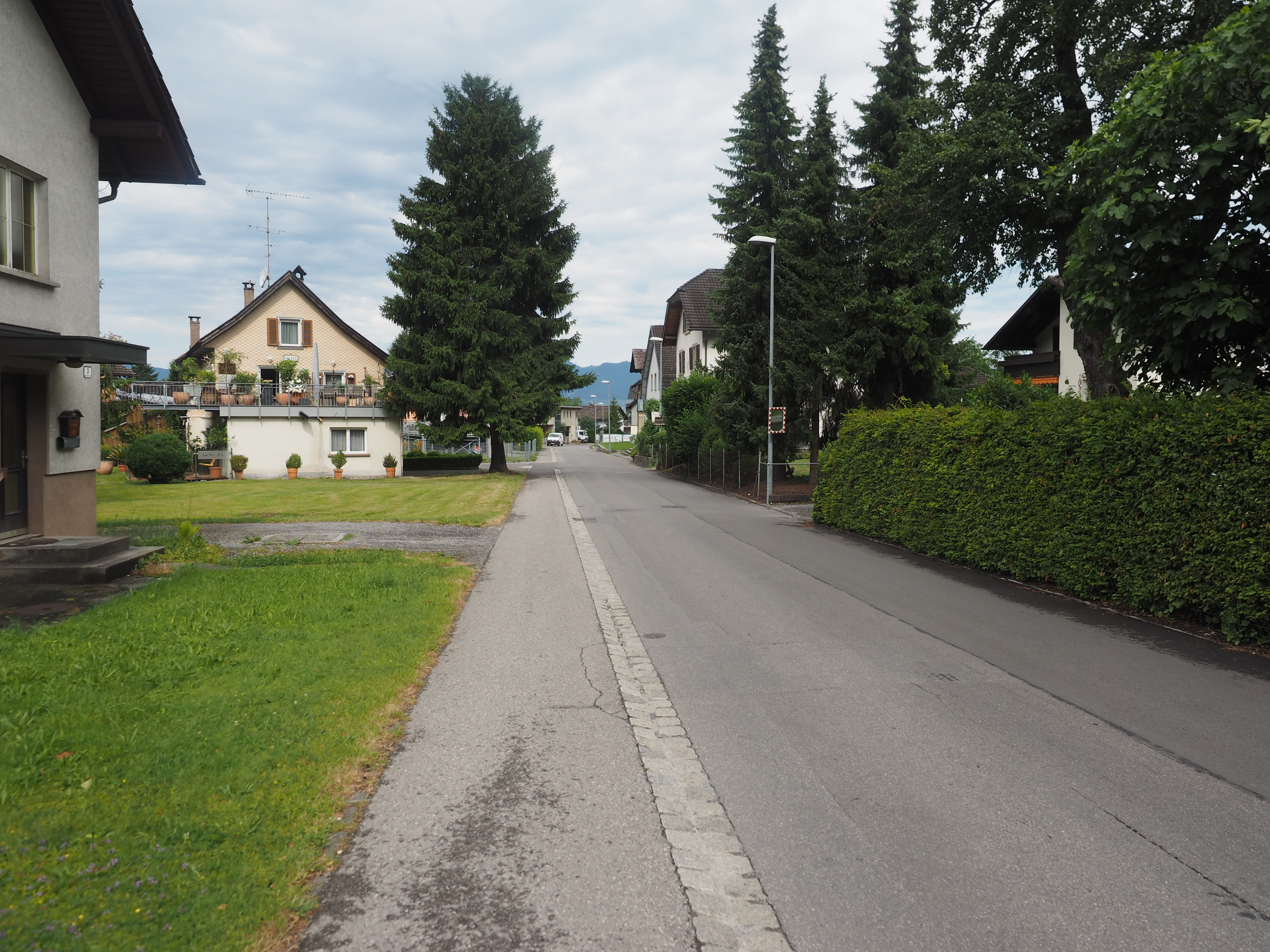
Central Hohenems, east of the railway station.

Apart from the historical sites, the town center is rapidly developing a modest urban ambience, with hotels, shops, and restaurants. On the outskirts of town there are large businesses, with branches of multinational retail chains and a ten-screen multiplex. On the way to the mountain village Reute, high above Hohenems, there is a unique museum – Stoffels Säge-Mühle ("Stoffel's Sawmill") – which presents the history of saw milling and mill grinding technologies.

Hohenems has several leisure amenities. In the mountain area there is a small ski resort (Schuttannen) and a rock-climbing area called Löwenzähne ("Lion's Teeth") with walls up to 150 m (500 ft) and level 10. There also is a wide range of hiking trails and mountain biking routes nearby. The town boasts of the largest recreational centers (13 hectares) in Vorarlberg, situated on the banks of the river Rhine's oxbow lake.

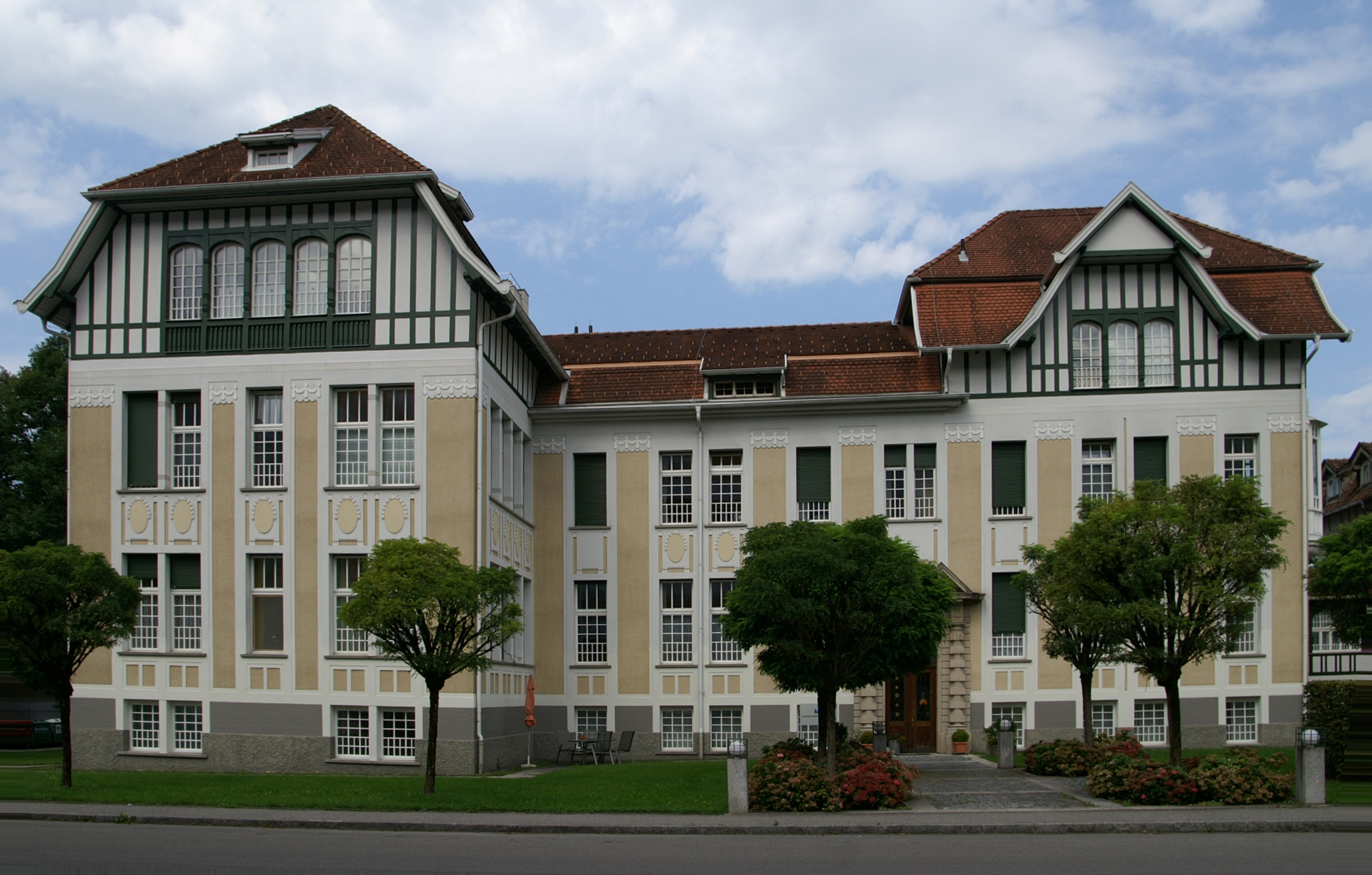
Altes Krankenhaus (old hospital)

One section of the hospital in Hohenems was originally built in 1908, and has now been totally renovated. Called the Kaiserin-Elisabeth-Krankenhaus ("Empress Elisabeth hospital"), it is a magnificent example of Art Nouveau architecture. It hosts the palliative care unit. The modern General Hospital was built in 1972.

=== Transport ===
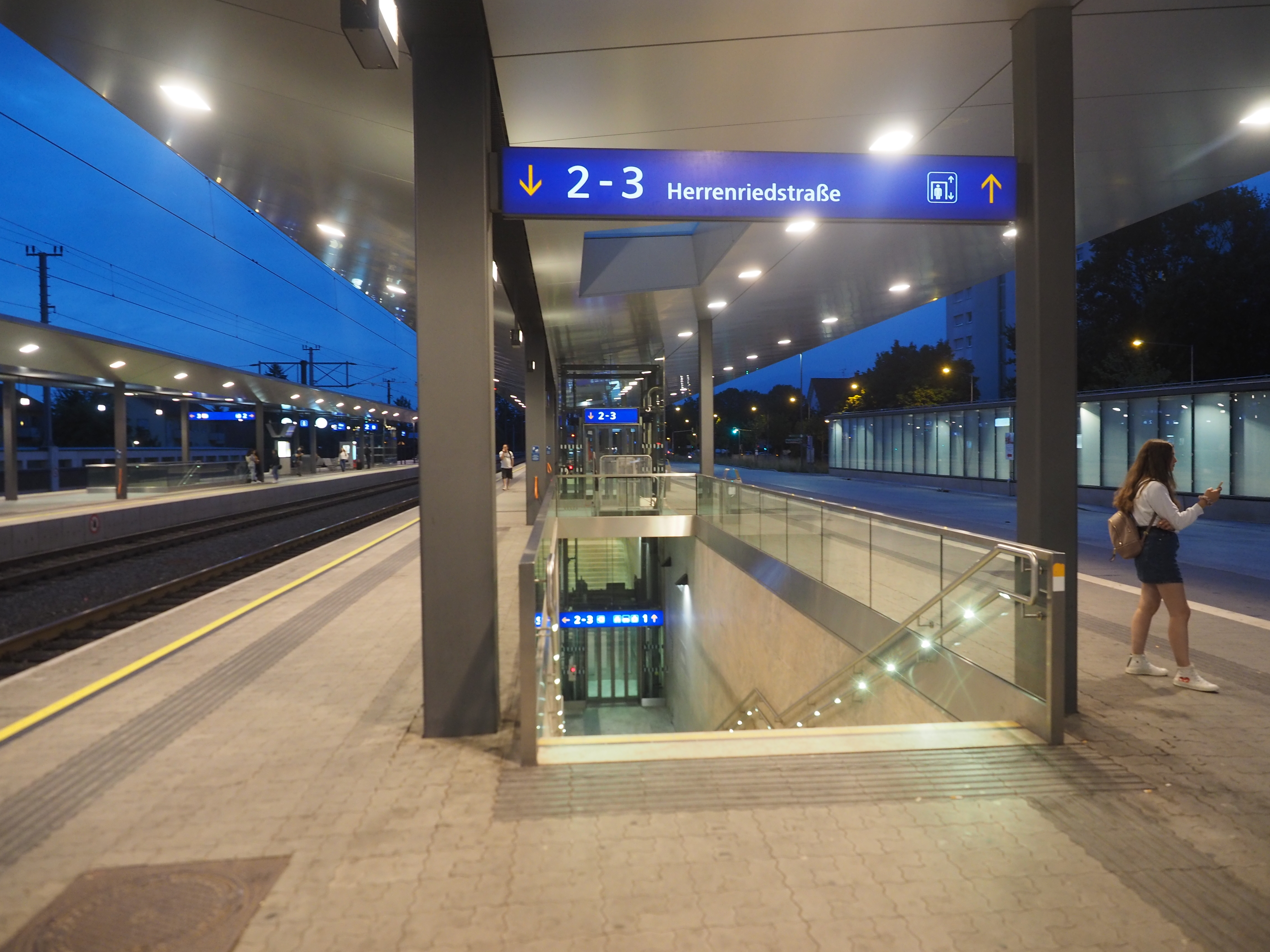
Hohenems railway station.

Two state roads, the Vorarlberger Strasse L190 and the Rheinstrasse L203 cross the municipality from north to south. The L46 leads from the town center to the customs buildings at the border to Switzerland. Hohenems has motorway access to the Rheintal/Walgau-Autobahn (Austrian A14/European route E60).

Hohenems railway station is on the main west–east route connecting the Vorarlberg railway line (Vorarlbergbahn) in the directions Bregenz and Innsbruck. The train system is operated by the Austrian Federal Railways (ÖBB).

The sole airfield in Vorarlberg, with a 630 m (2,066 ft) runway, is located within the municipal borders

== Trivia ==
Hohenems was one of the locations in the Swiss-Austrian film Akte Grüninger.

The town is the site of the climax of Dennis Wheatley's novel about the 1914 outbreak of the First World War, The Second Seal (1950).

Bernard Levin mentions Hohenems in his book Conducted Tour (1982) as being the location of a music festival where all the works of Franz Schubert were performed in chronological order.

== Twin towns ==
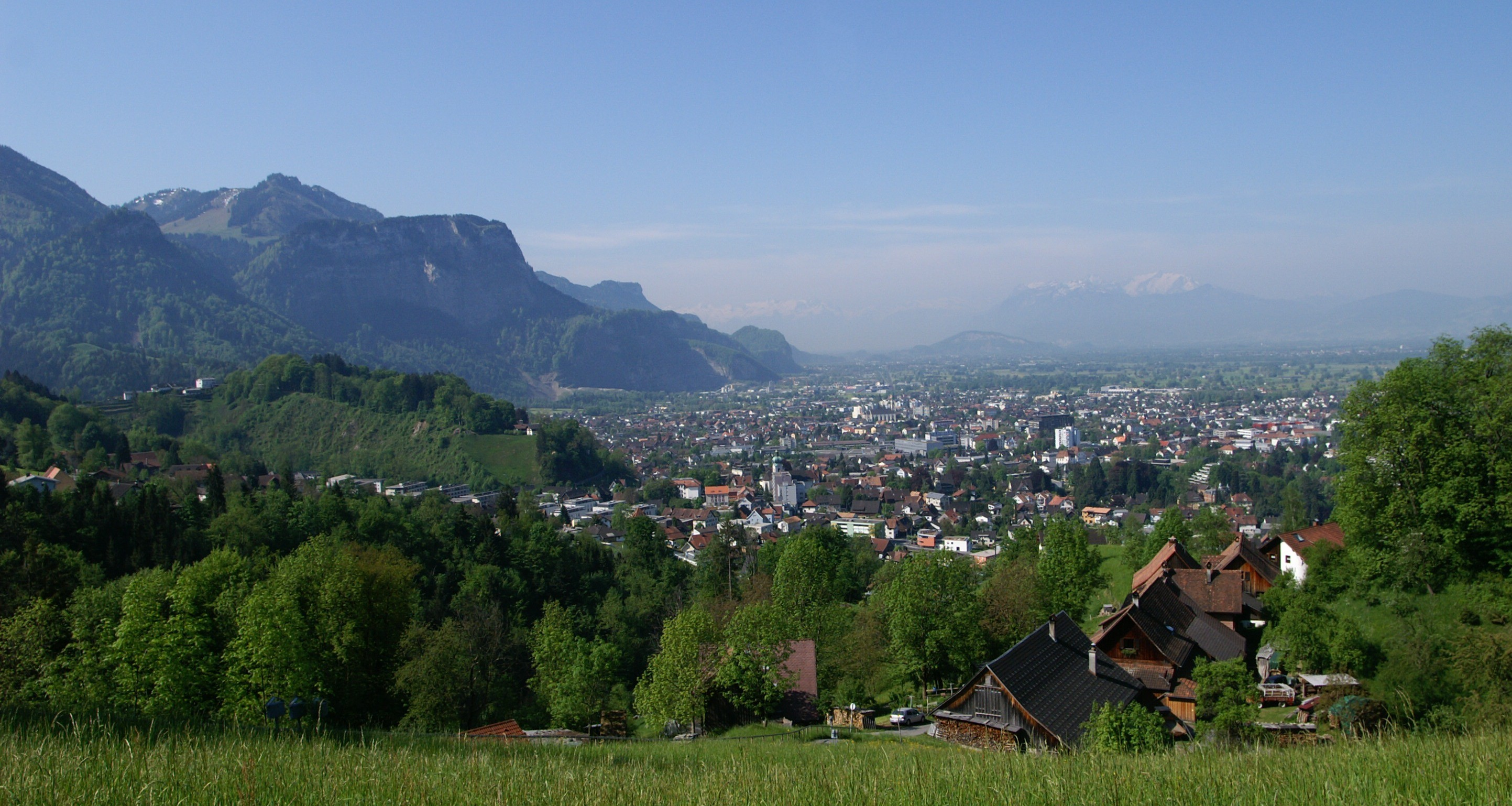

Hohenems has twinned with
Bystré and Polička in the Czech Republic (since 1997)
Ostfildern in the Germany (since 2009)

== Notable persons ==
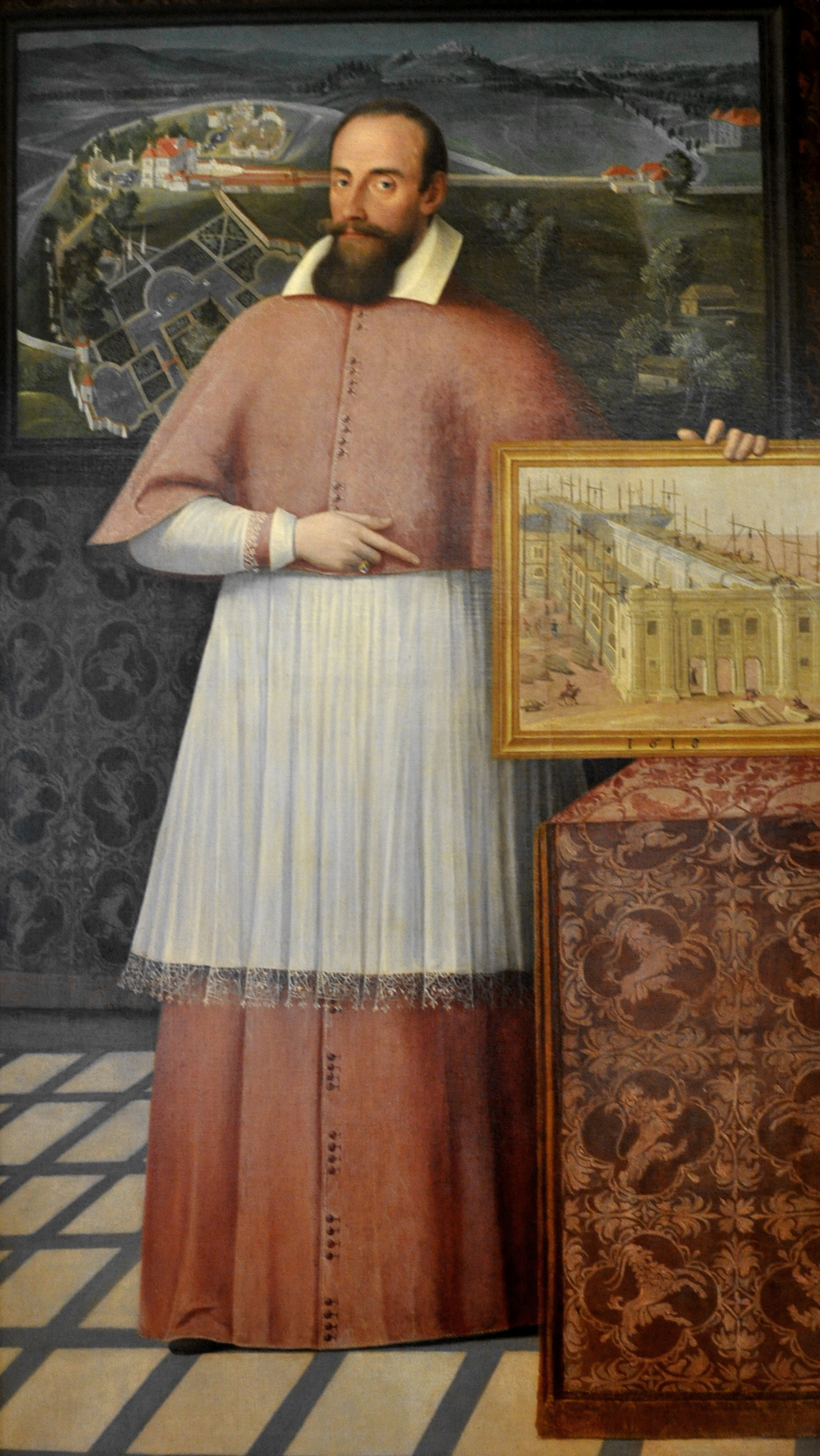
Markus Sittich von Hohenems, 1618

- Rudolf von Ems (1200–1254), Middle High German poet and minstrel.
- Markus Sittich von Hohenems (1574–1619), Archbishop of Salzburg
- Salomon Sulzer (1804–1890), Cantor and composer
- August Brentano (1828–1886), New York City newspaper dealer; emigrated in 1851
- Eugen Steinach (1861–1944), an Austrian physiologist and pioneer in endocrinology.
- Bernhard Vogel, (DE Wiki) (1913–2000), politician (SPÖ), member of Parliament and the Federal Council
- Michael Köhlmeier (born 1949), Austrian writer and musician, lives locally
- Hans Jörg Schelling (born 1953), entrepreneur, politician (ÖVP) and former Federal Minister of Finance
- Fatima Spar, (DE Wiki) (born 1977), jazz singer and composer

=== Sport ===
- Adi Hütter (born 1970), football player and coach, played 480 games and 14 for Austria
- Wolfram Waibel Jr. (born 1970), sports marksman, bronze and silver medallist at the 1996 Summer Olympics
- Harald Morscher (born 1972), retired cyclist
- Christian Klien (born 1983), former Formula One racing driver
- Ramazan Özcan (born 1984), football goalkeeper, played over 240 games and 10 for Austria
- Matthias Brändle (born 1989), professional cyclist
- Kevin Fend (born 1990), an Austrian football goalkeeper; has played over 330 games
- Marcel Mathis (born 1993), alpine skier
- David Reinbacher, professional ice hockey player
