= Templemoor =

Historic house in West Virginia, United States

- U.S. National Register of Historic Places
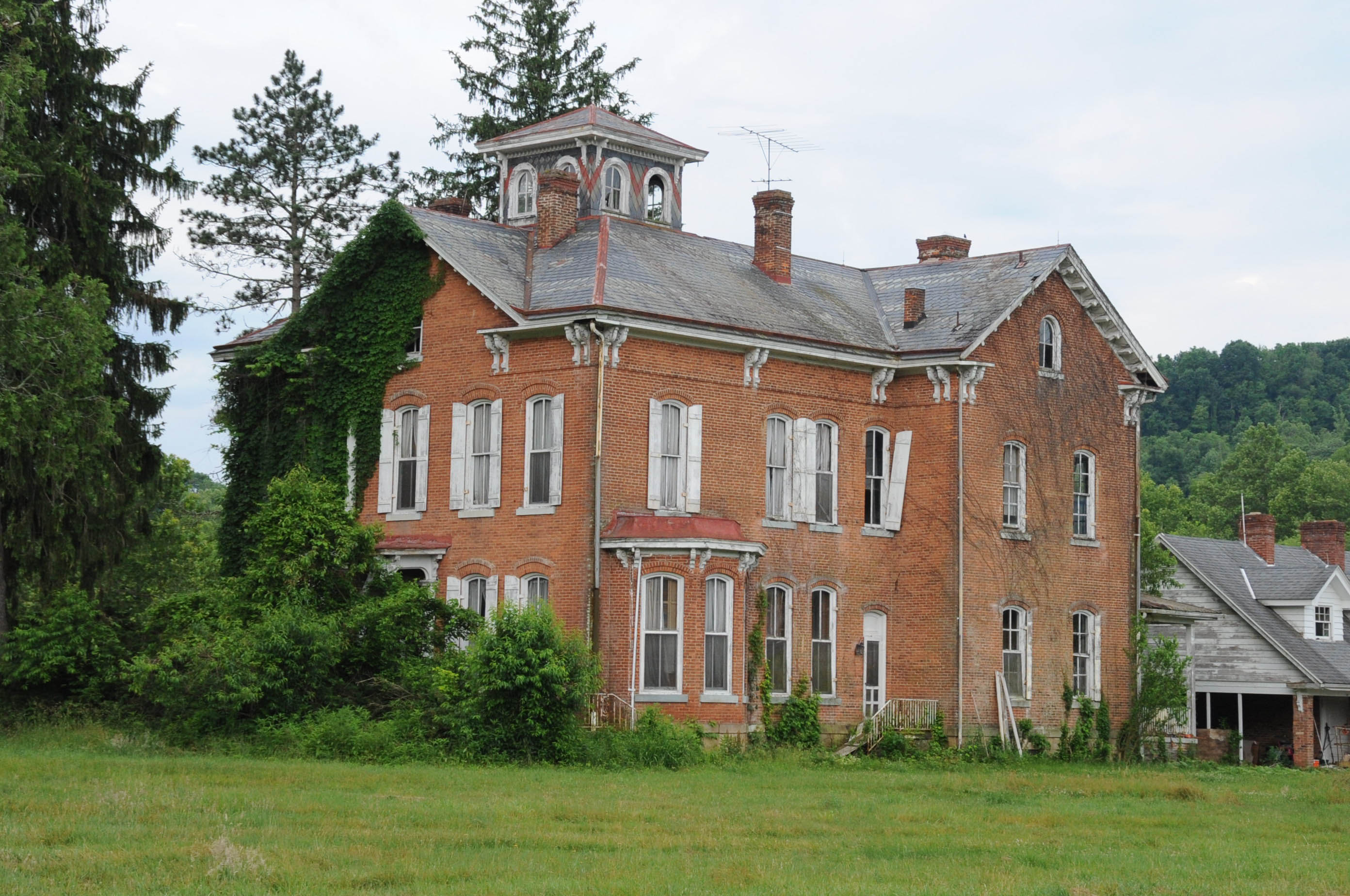
- In 2016

- Location within West Virginia Location within the United States
- Nearest city: WV 20, near Clarksburg, West Virginia
- Coordinates: 39°8′41″N 80°14′27″W
- Area: 3 acres (1.2 ha)
- Built: 1874
- Architectural style: Italianate, Italian Villa
- NRHP reference No.: 82004318
- Added to NRHP: April 15, 1982

"Templemoor", also known as the Post-Crawford House, is a historic home located near Clarksburg approximately halfway between Romines Mills and Peeltree, in Harrison County, West Virginia. It was built in 1874 for Ira Carper Post, and is a 2 1/2-story brick mansion in the Italianate style. It features a combination hip and gable roof covered in polychrome slate shingles. It was the boyhood home of noted West Virginia author Melville Davisson Post (1869-1930) who was famous for mystery and fiction novels. The home includes 13 rooms, many featuring top-of-the-line woodwork.

It was listed on the National Register of Historic Places in 1982.

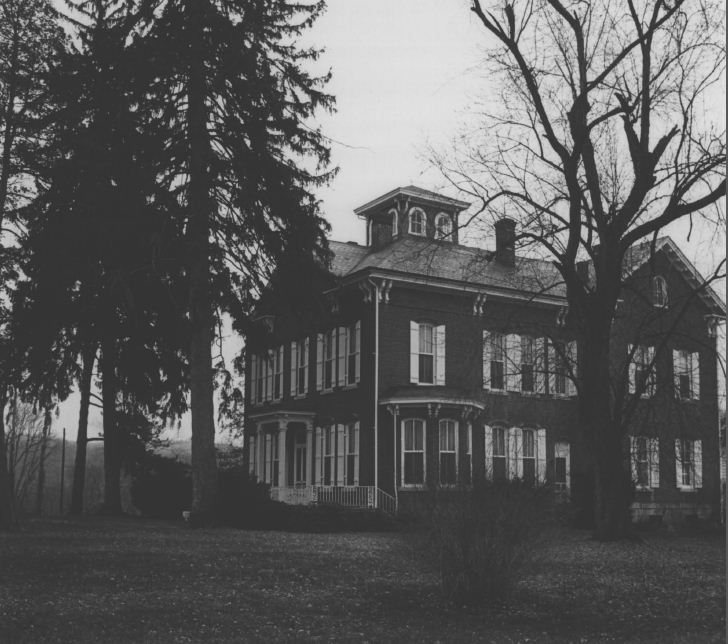
early photo
