= Heinrich von Brentano =

German politician and lawyer (1904–1964)

Heinrich von Brentano GCC
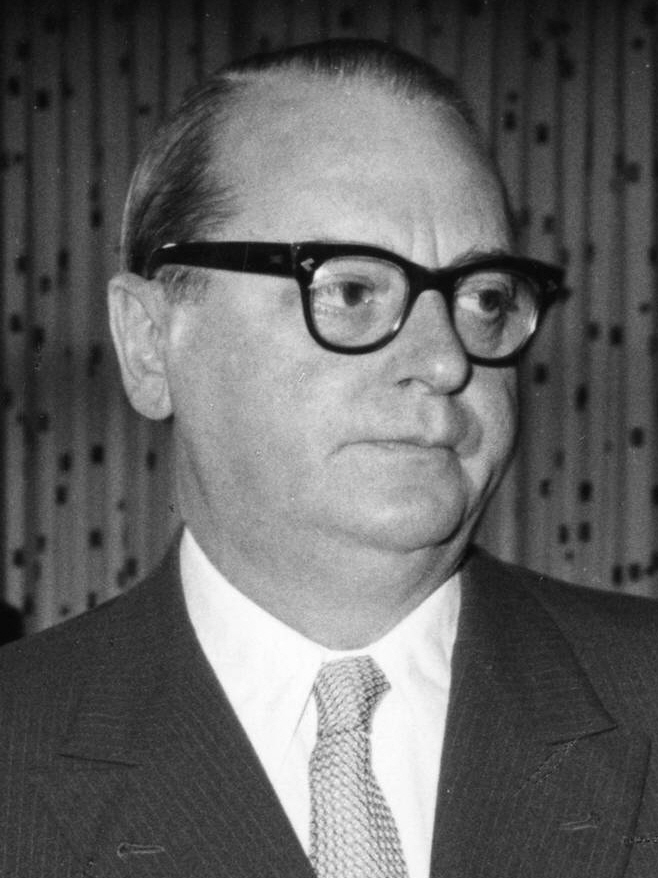
- Brentano in 1960

Minister of Foreign Affairs
- In office 6 June 1955 – 30 October 1961
- Chancellor: Konrad Adenauer
- Preceded by: Konrad Adenauer
- Succeeded by: Gerhard Schröder

Leader of the CDU/CSU Group in the Bundestag
- In office 24 November 1961 – 14 November 1964
- Deputy: Werner Dollinger; Franz Josef Strauss
- Preceded by: Heinrich Krone
- Succeeded by: Rainer Barzel
- In office 30 September 1949 – 15 June 1955
- Deputy: Franz Josef Strauss; Richard Stücklen
- Preceded by: Konrad Adenauer
- Succeeded by: Heinrich Krone

Member of the Bundestag; for Bergstraße
- In office 14 August 1949 – 14 November 1964
- Preceded by: Constituency established
- Succeeded by: Ludwig Preiß

Member of the Landtag of Hesse
- In office 26 February 1946 – 24 October 1949
- Preceded by: Constituency established
- Succeeded by: Alois Marx
- Constituency: State list (1946); Wahlkreis I (1946–1949)

Personal details
- Born: 6 June 1904 Offenbach, Germany
- Died: 14 November 1964 (aged 60) Darmstadt, West Germany
- Party: Christian Democratic Union
- Relatives: Bernard von Brentano (brother)
- Education: University of Giessen

Heinrich Joseph Maximilian Johann Maria von Brentano di Tremezzo (20 June 1904 – 14 November 1964), known professionally as Heinrich von Brentano, was a German politician of the Christian Democratic Union (CDU). He served as Federal Minister for Foreign Affairs from 1955 to 1961.

== Personal life ==
Brentano was born in Offenbach am Main, the son of the Centre politician Otto von Brentano, a member of the 1919 Weimar National Assembly. The Brentano family, of Italian (Lombard) origin, had settled in the Landgraviate of Hesse-Darmstadt in the 17th century and were recognized as Hessian nobles, with close contact to important figures of the German Romanticism, including Goethe, Savigny and Arnim. He was related to famous German poets such as Clemens Brentano (1778–1842) and Bettina von Arnim (1785–1859). The author Bernard von Brentano (1901–1964) was his elder brother.

Upon his Abitur degree in 1922, Heinrich von Brentano studied jurisprudence at the Ludwig-Maximilians-Universität München and took his first and second Staatsexamen in 1925 and 1929. He received his doctorate from the University of Giessen and from 1932 worked as a lawyer in Darmstadt, from 1943 until 1945 as a prosecutor in Hanau.

Brentano remained a bachelor throughout his life, living with his mother up to her death in 1948. In 1961, rumors circulated about his homosexuality, to which Adenauer drily replied: "He has not hit on me yet."

Brentano died of cancer at the age of 60. He was buried at Waldfriedhof Darmstadt.

== Political career ==
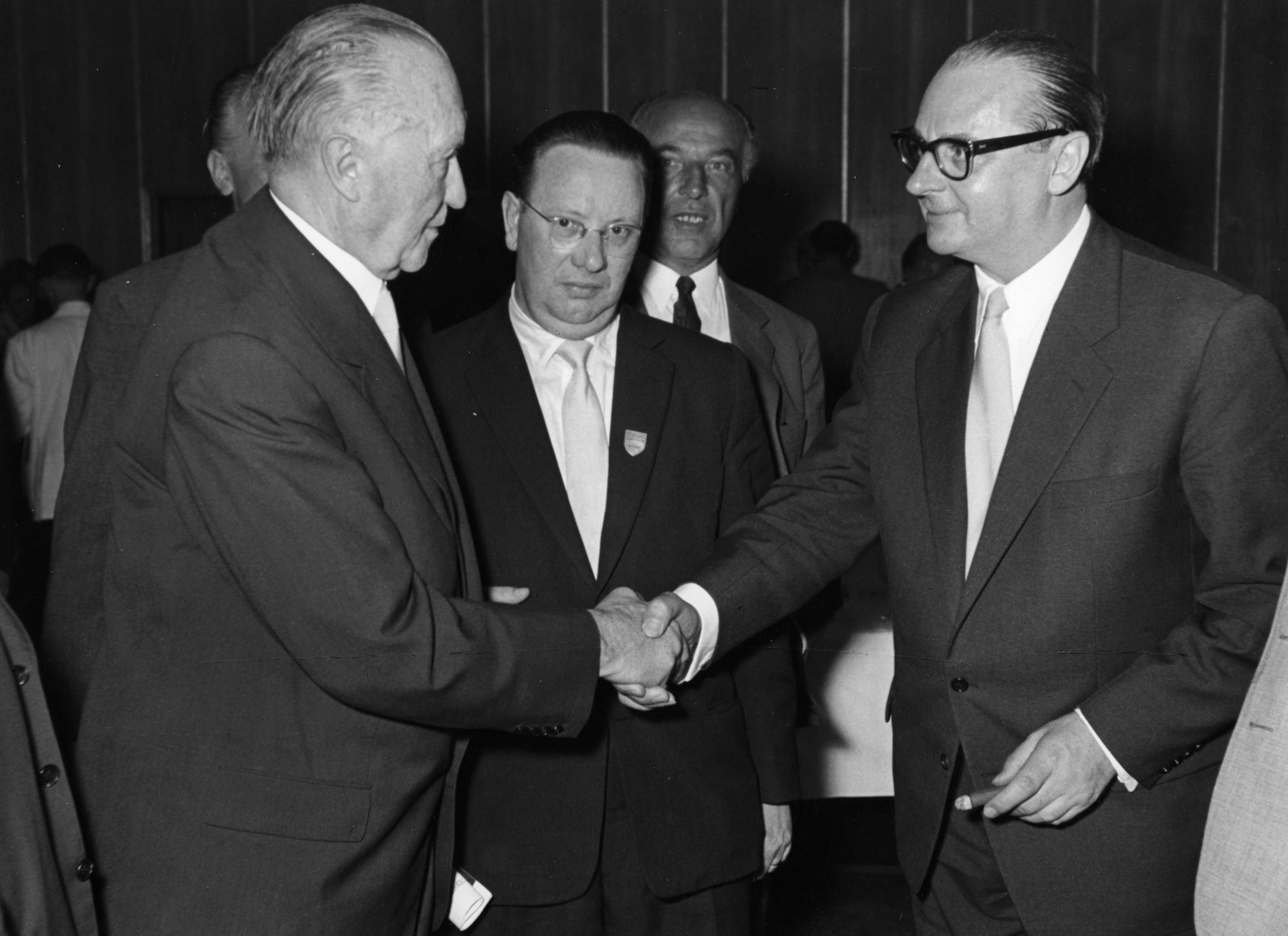
Brentano (r.) with Adenauer at a 1957 CDU party conference

After World War II, Brentano was one of the founders of the Christian Democratic Union in Hesse and became a member of the Landtag of Hesse in 1946, from 1947 as chairman of the parliamentary group.

He also attended the proceedings of the Parlamentarischer Rat assembly drafting the Basic Law for the Federal Republic of Germany. In the federal elections of 1949, he obtained a seat in the West German Bundestag parliament by directly winning the mandate of the Bergstraße constituency. In 1952, he and other CDU MPs advocated the implementation of a plurality voting system instead of the personalized proportional representation concept, though to no avail. In the federal parliament, he served as head of the CDU/CSU faction from 1949 to 1955 and again from 1961 until his death.

A member of the European Movement Germany, the European Common Assembly and the Parliamentary Assembly of the Council of Europe, Brentano was an important figure in the foundation of the European Economic Community (EEC).

After the Allied occupation statute had been lifted in 1955, he was appointed Foreign Minister of Germany at the suggestion of Chancellor Konrad Adenauer, who prior had filled the office himself. Brentano resigned when Adenauer had to form a coalition government with the Free Democratic Party (FDP) after the federal election of 1961 and had to accept the appointment of an FDP state secretary in the Foreign Office. He was succeeded by his party fellow Gerhard Schröder.

== Honours ==
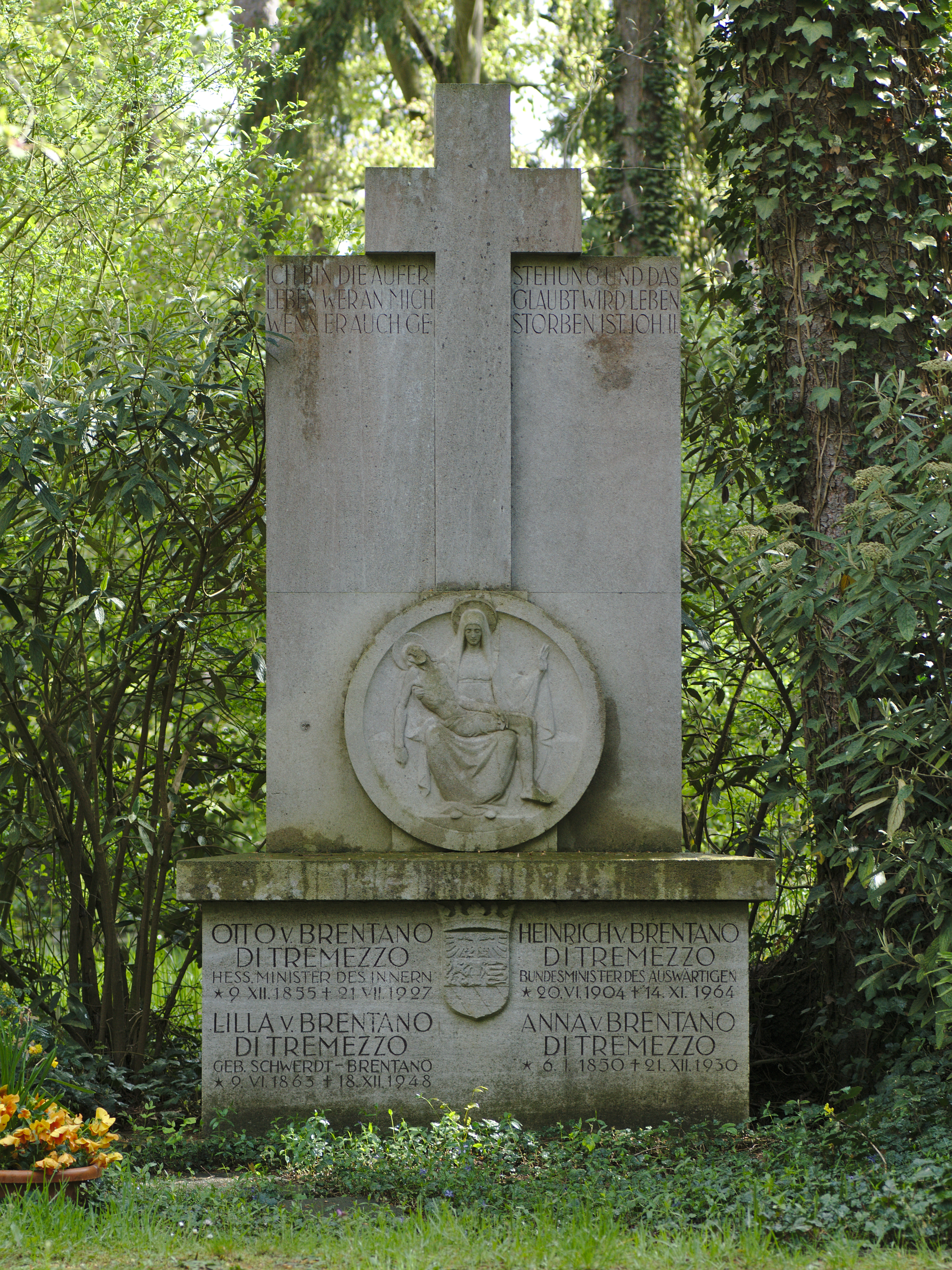
Grave.

=== Foreign honours ===
- Grand Cross of the Order of Christ, Portugal (10 April 1958)

Political offices
Preceded by Konrad Adenauer	Federal Minister of Foreign Affairs; 1955–1961	Succeeded by Gerhard Schröder
