= Kroch's and Brentano's =

American bookstore/bookstore chain

- Type: Private
- Industry: Retail
- Predecessor: Kroch's; Chicago branch of Brentano's
- Founded: November 22, 1954; 71 years ago in Chicago
- Founder: Carl Kroch
- Defunct: July 31, 1995; 31 years ago
- Fate: Bankruptcy
- Headquarters: Chicago
- Area served: Chicago metropolitan area
- Products: Books, magazines

Kroch's and Brentano's was the largest bookstore in Chicago, and at one time it was the largest privately owned bookstore chain in the United States. The store and the chain were formed in 1954 through the merger of the separate Kroch's bookstore with the former Chicago branch of the New York-based Brentano's bookstore. The chain was closed in 1995 after suffering financial losses from increased competition.

== History ==
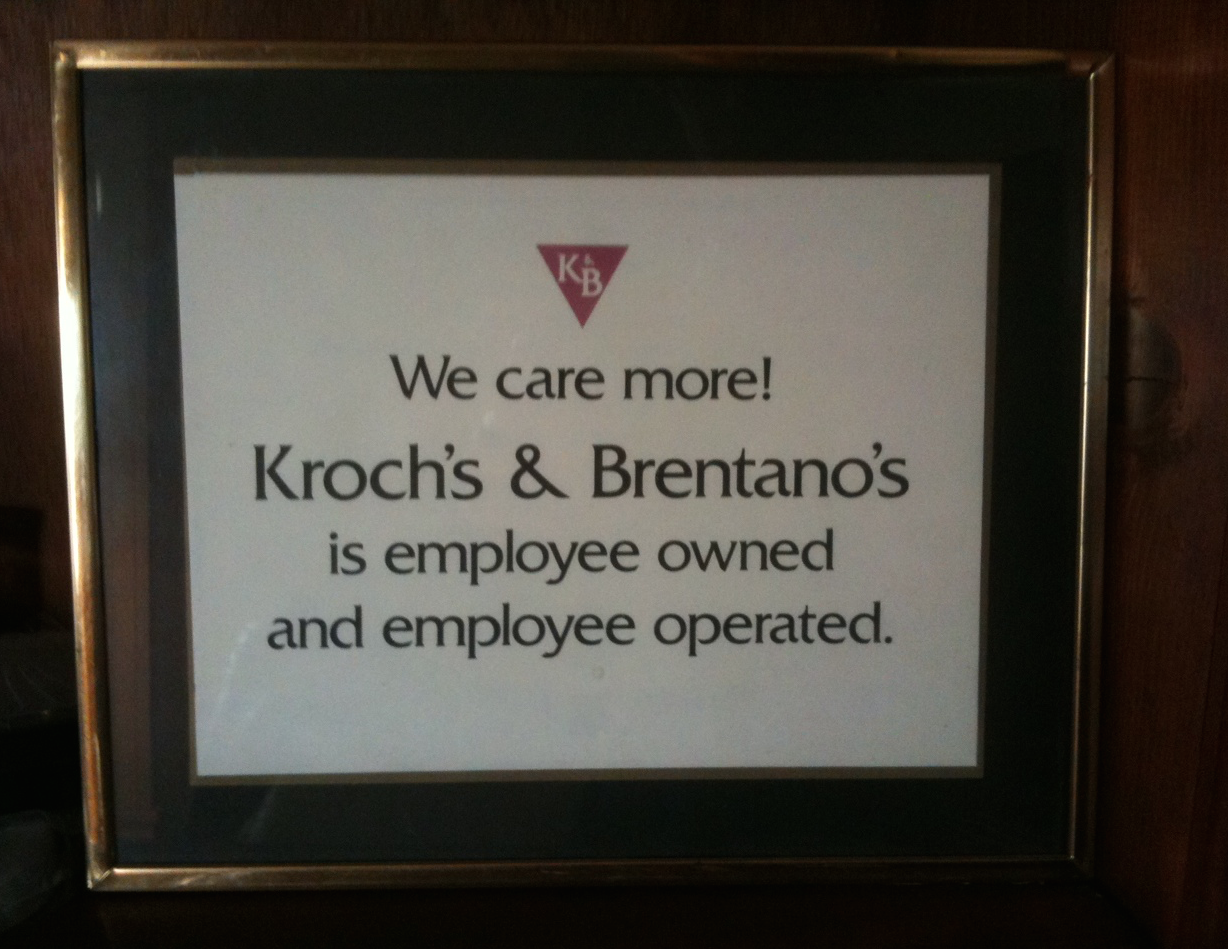
Photograph of Kroch's & Brentano's sign

Adolph Kroch, an Austrian immigrant to Chicago, founded a German-language bookstore on Monroe Street in 1907. He switched to English-language books during World War I. A few years, later he moved the store to a larger location at 22 N. Michigan. After 15 years at that location, Kroch's International Book Shop moved to 206 N. Michigan Avenue in 1927. This store became the largest bookstore in Chicago by the time this location was closed in 1953.

In 1933, Kroch was able to purchase the Chicago branch of the New York-based Brentano's bookstore which had been in Chicago since 1884. To prevent Brentano's from re-entering Chicago, Kroch kept the Brentano name and operated this store as a separate business from his own Kroch's bookstore until his retirement.

Adolf Kroch decided to retire in 1947 and to hand over the management of the company to his son Carl. In 1953, Carl announced that he would form the "World's Largest Bookstore" the following year by merging the separate Kroch's and Brentano's bookstores and by enlarging the space that was then occupied by Brentano's at 29 South Wabash Avenue to 40,000 square feet of retail space. In the basement of this store was another store that was called "Super Book Mart" which specialized in carrying paperbacks and low cost hardback reprints, the first of its kind in Chicago.

Kroch's and Brentano's was said to have the finest selection of art books in the region, and its sales clerks were famously knowledgeable. One such individual was Henry Tabor, who ran the art department. There was seemingly nothing he didn't know in the world of art. The flagship store at 29 S. Wabash had several distinct departments including one run by Alice (Morimoto) Goda who was secretary to the vice-president which was a mail order center that tracked down obscure out-of-print titles for customers around the world. The store frequently exhibited noted painters' and photographers' work on the walls, and regularly hosted book signings by major authors.

At its peak Kroch's had a total of 22 stores in the Chicago metropolitan area. Kroch refused to offer the sorts of discounts that other book chains did, even though the store suffered when large discount chains, such as Crown Books, opened up nearby. When Crown opened its downtown Chicago store a few blocks north of the 29 S. Wabash location, Kroch's management felt that it was not a serious threat, since it did not offer "full service". However, unable to compete with the discount bookstores, Kroch's and Brentano's closed its doors in 1995. Always known for major book signings through its entire history, its final major book signing was with heavyweight boxing champion George Foreman, who was promoting his autobiography By George. That event was hosted by Don Hailman, a long time manager with the company. Employee Hans Summers waited on the store's final customer at its flagship store on Wabash in downtown Chicago.

At the age of 72, owner Carl Kroch decided to step down as president and CEO and sell the chain to his 700 employees in 1986. At the time of the transition the chain had 17 locations. Increased competition from Crown, Borders, Barnes & Noble, and other discount bookstores forced the company to close all 10 of its suburban mall locations and leaving the remaining 7 Chicago locations open in 1993. A few months later when the company was on verge of bankruptcy, Kroch bought back the company and then turned around and resold the company to Businesship International. After closing more stores, the new parent company was unable to turn the company around and was forced to file for bankruptcy in June 1995 and was liquidated. The remaining stores finally closed on July 31, 1995.

== Brentano's in Chicago ==
During the late part of the Nineteenth and the early part of the Twentieth Centuries, the New York City-based Brentano's had a branch store in Chicago. This store had been operating for several decades before Adolph Kroch opened his bookstore.

In 1884, Arthur Brentano opened the Chicago branch of his family's New York bookstore at 101 State street. By 1930, Brentano's was the largest bookstore chain in the United States with 10 locations, 5 of which were outside of New York City, plus 2 additional affiliated locations in Europe. Unfortunately, Brentano's expanded too fast just prior to the start of the Great Depression and its creditors, mostly publishers and banks, forced the company to file for bankruptcy in March 1933. The creditors preferred to see the assets of the firm sold to a group willing to maintain the company as on going business enterprise instead of liquidating the firm and glutting the bookselling market by having a large number of books being at below costs and thus destroying the bookselling market for publishers and other dealers.

At the bankruptcy sale, financier (and later U.S. ambassador) Stanton Griffis teamed up with Adolf Kroch to make the successful bid to purchase the firm. Their bid was successful since they were the only group that had included a successful bookstore owner, which probably influenced the decision made by the creditors.

For his part in the bankruptcy sale, Kroch received the Chicago branch store and the exclusive right to use and control the Brentano's name within the states of Illinois, Michigan, Indiana, and Wisconsin. Kroch kept his Brentano's store in Chicago as a separate subsidiary of his existing Kroch's bookstore until 1954 when both stores were combined to form Kroch's and Brentano's. When the first combined Kroch's & Brentano's bookstore opened in 1954, this became the largest bookstore in Chicago at 40,000 square feet.

Kroch had succeeded in preventing MacMillan, Waldenbooks, and Borders from using the Brentano's name within the Chicago area market.

== See also ==
- List of bookstore chains
- Bookselling
