= Bernard von Brentano =

German writer (1901–1964)

Bernard von Brentano (15 October 1901, in Offenbach am Main – 29 December 1964, in Wiesbaden) was a German writer, poet, playwright, storyteller, novelist, essayist and journalist.

== Life ==
Brentano was born on 15 October 1901, a son of the Hessian Interior and Justice Minister Otto Rudolf von Brentano di Tremezzo and a brother of Clemens and Heinrich von Brentano. His mother, Lilla Beata née Schwerdt maternally stems from the Frankfurt line of the Brentano family. In contrast to his brothers, Bernard von Brentano hardly used the full name of his family, Brentano di Tremezzo.

Brentano studied philosophy in Freiburg, Munich, Frankfurt and Berlin. In Frankfurt, he became an active member of the catholic student association Bavaria. In Munich he was a member of the K. St. V. Rheno-Bavaria. Brentano became a member of the PEN-Club in 1920. From 1925 to 1930, he worked in the Berlin office of the Frankfurter Zeitung, where he became the successor of Joseph Roth. He was also involved in the Association of proletarian revolutionary writers and worked for the Communist literary magazine Die Linkskurve. A KPD member, he later left the party and distanced himself from politics after some trips to Moscow and because of the party's Stalinist tendencies.

Together with Berthold Brecht and Herbert Ihering he planned to edit the magazine "Krisis und Kritik", which, however, never appeared. In 1933, he emigrated to Switzerland and his family lived in Küsnacht in Zurich. In 1949, he returned from exile back to Germany. He lived with his family in Wiesbaden.

== Works ==
- Über den Ernst des Lebens, 1929
- Kapitalismus und schöne Literatur, 1930
- Der Beginn der Barbarei in Deutschland, 1932
- Berliner Novellen, 1934
- Theodor Chindler, 1936
- Prozess ohne Richter, 1937
- Die ewigen Gefühle, 1939
- Une Famille Allemande, 1939
- Phädra. Drama, 1939
- Tagebuch mit Büchern, 1943
- August Wilhelm Schlegel, 1944
- Goethe und Marianne von Willemer, 1945
- Franziska Scheler, 1945
- Martha und Maria, 1946
- Streifzüge, 1947
- Die Schwestern Usedom, 1948
- Sophie Charlotte und Danckelmann, 1949
- Du Land der Liebe, 1952
