= Clode =

Clode is a surname. Notable people with this surname include:

- Brent Clode (born 1963), New Zealand sprint canoer
- Danielle Clode, Australian author
- Harry Clode (1877–1964), English cricket player
- Mark Clode (born 1973), English football player
- Millie Clode (born 1982), English television presenter
