= August Brentano =

American newspaper dealer

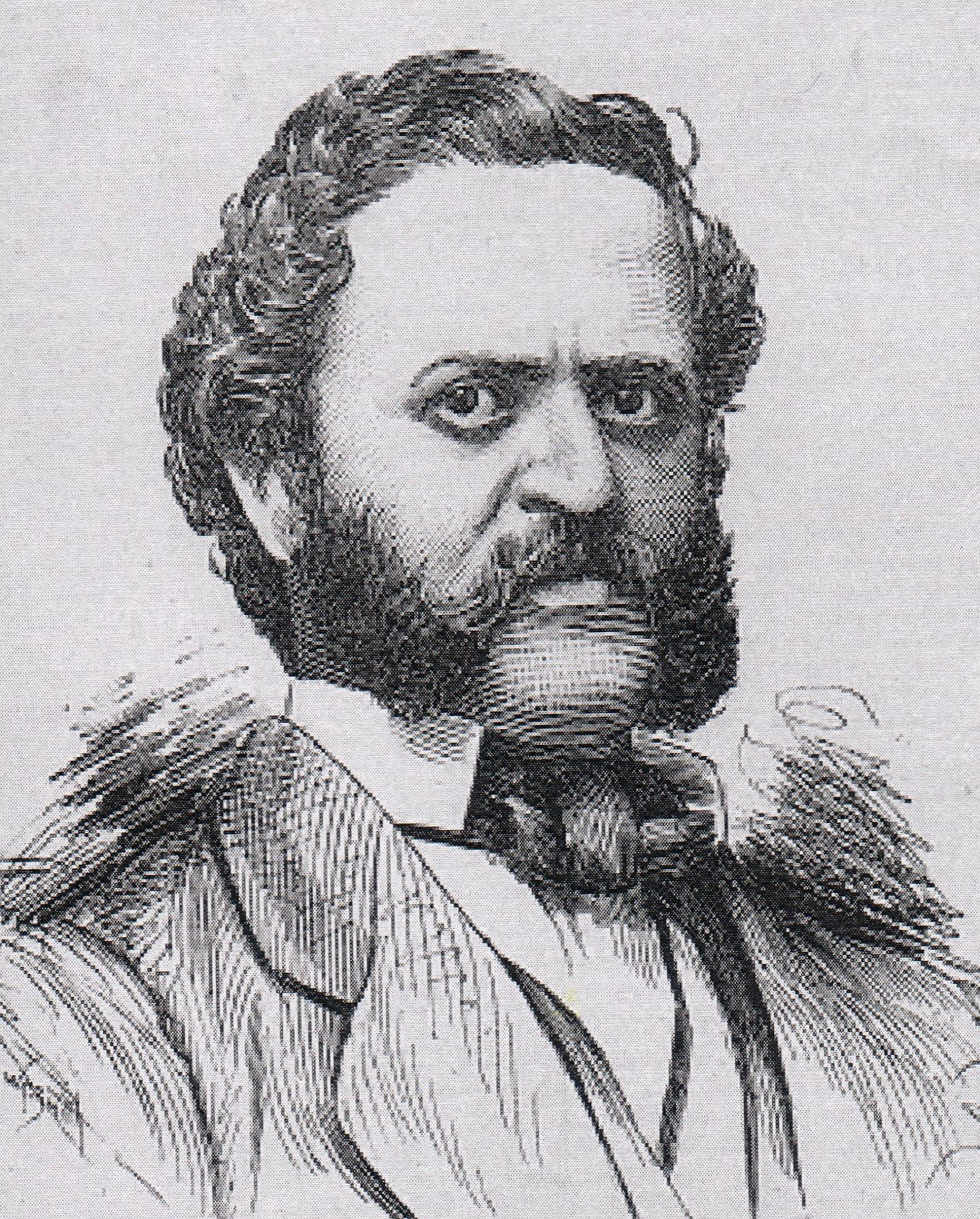
August Brentano (undated)

August Brentano (December 23, 1828 – November 2, 1886) was an Austrian-born American newspaper dealer in New York.

== Background ==
August Brentano was born on December 23, 1828, in Hohenems, Austria. He immigrated to the United States in 1851.

== Career ==
Brentano started a business as a newspaper carrier. Before arriving in New York, he opened a large stand at the Revere House in Boston, Massachusetts. Brentano later ran a store at 636 Broadway. His business was significant because of its large circulation, varied distribution sites, and being among the first in the United States to import newspapers from London and other cities in England.

=== Expansion ===
As of 1868, Brentano and his family worked at 39 Union Square, where their trade built a fine reputation. In 1877 Brentano sold his business interest in New York City to his nephews. They established additional newspaper businesses in Washington, D.C. and Chicago, Illinois, which were managed by August Brentano.

=== Brentano's (bookstore) ===
In 1853, "Brentano's" independent bookstore started as a newsstand in front of the New York Hotel. In 1883, the first branch opened in Washington, D.C. In 1884, a second branch was opened in Chicago.

== Death ==
Brentano died at the age of 57 on November 2, 1886, in Chicago, Illinois, where he had lived since 1883. Brentano, who never married, was survived by three nephews, August, Arthur, and Simon Brentano, all of them residing in New York City. Brentano's funeral, a Jewish service, was carried out at the home of Mrs. Simon Brentano at 12 Livingston Place. August Brentano was buried at Cypress Hills Cemetery in New York City.

== See also ==
- Brentano's
