= Brentano's =

American bookstore chain

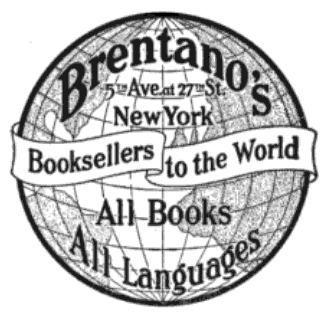
- Logo in the book Primary Education, 1916
- Industry: Retail
- Founded: 1853
- Founder: August Brentano
- Defunct: 1983 (as a separate company); 2011 (as part of Borders)
- Fate: Absorbed into Borders Group in the U.S.; liquidated in the U.S.
- Products: Books, magazines, comic books, maps, calendars, paintings, stationery

Brentano's was an American bookstore chain with numerous locations in the United States.

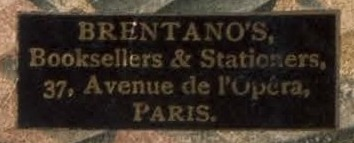
Brentano's booksellers label in 1915 Paris

As of the 1970s, there were four Brentano's in New York: the Fifth Avenue flagship store at Rockefeller Center, one in Greenwich Village, one in Manhasset, and one in White Plains. There was a store in the Bergen Mall in Paramus, New Jersey which closed as the Short Hills, New Jersey store was being built. There were Boston-area stores in Chestnut Hill and the Prudential Center, and another in Austin, Texas. There were also three stores in Southern California: in Westwood Village, Beverly Hills, and Costa Mesa. There were two stores outside of Washington, D.C.: one in the Seven Corners shopping center in Falls Church, Virginia, and another in Prince Georges Plaza in Maryland.

Brentano's was owned by Macmillan in the 1970s and early 1980s, before being bought out by three of Brentano's higher ranking employees. Soon after, Brentano's became a part of the Waldenbooks subsidiary of Borders, an Ann Arbor, Michigan–based book and music retailer.

== History ==
Brentano's was founded as an independent bookstore in New York City in 1853 by August Brentano, who established a newsstand in front of the New York Hotel.

The first branch store for the company was opened in Washington D.C. in 1883. A year later, a second branch store was opened in Chicago in 1884.

Simon Brentano served as president of the firm until his death in 1915. He was replaced by his brother Arthur.

By 1928, Brentano's had four stores outside of New York City, in Washington D.C., Chicago, London, and Paris. On the eve of the Great Depression, the firm expanded rapidly to become the largest bookstore chain in the nation with four stores in New York City, plus single stores in Chicago, Philadelphia, Boston, and Washington. However, the firm acquired a lot of debt in the process and its creditors forced the company to reorganize in 1930 while still allowing the Brentano family to manage the chain. Even though the company continued to have cash flow problems, the company went ahead and opened its tenth store within the United States in Pittsburgh in 1930.

The creditor-imposed reorganization plan of 1930 did not solve the cash flow problem. In March 1933, Brentano's was forced by its publishers and banks to file for bankruptcy.

During the bankruptcy sale, financier (and later U.S. ambassador) Stanton Griffis and Chicago bookstore owner Adolf Kroch bought the firm. Griffis became the chairman of the board of directors while keeping Arthur Brentano on as president. For his part in the bankruptcy sale, Kroch received the Chicago branch store and the exclusive right to use and control the Brentano's name within the states of Illinois, Michigan, Indiana, and Wisconsin. Kroch kept his Brentano's store in Chicago as a separate subsidiary of his existing Kroch's bookstore until 1954, when the stores were combined to form Kroch's and Brentano's. Kroch succeeded in preventing MacMillan, Waldenbooks, and Borders from using the Brentano's name within the Chicago area market.

In 1944, Arthur Brentano died and was replaced as president by his son, Arthur Brentano Jr. Five years later, Arthur Brentano, Jr. was replaced as president by Nixon Griffis, the son of Stanton Griffis.

The publishing company Crowell Collier acquired Brentano's in 1962. At the time of the acquisition, Brentano's had 16 stores located in 5 states plus the District of Columbia. The first store in the rapidly expanding and lucrative southern California market was opened in the affluent suburb of Beverly Hills in 1972.

Two decades later, the corporate parent Macmillan, which had acquired Brentano's upon merger with Crowell Collier in 1961, decided to divest itself of Brentano's by selling the retail chain to Brentano's management in 1981. At the time of the sale, Brentano's had 28 stores with locations that had included Boston, Washington, Atlanta, Toronto, Dallas, San Francisco and San Diego. The new management was forced to file for bankruptcy less than a year later in 1982 and finally liquidated in 1984.

As part of the liquidation sale, the Waldenbooks subsidiary of Kmart acquired three stores that were located in Beverly Hills, Costa Mesa, and St. Louis with the original intention of converting the stores to the Waldenbooks brand. After remodeling, while keeping the Brentano's name, Waldenbooks discovered that the stores were bringing in more money than equivalent Waldenbooks of the same age so they decided to keep the Brentano's brand and expand the brand to other upscale neighborhoods as the upscale bookstore brand for the Walden Book division.

In 1992, Kmart acquired Borders. At that time, it kept Brentano's in the separate Waldenbooks division until the formation of the Borders-Walden Group that was done just prior to the Borders Group being spun off as an independent company in 1994. Under Borders, the Brentano's stores were still managed by Waldenbooks. With increased competition during the 1990s and 2000s from superstores and Internet stores, Borders was forced to close the money-losing Brentano and Waldenbooks stores. On 18 July 2011, Borders Group filed for bankruptcy and closed all remaining Brentano's stores.

== Stores outside of the United States ==
=== Europe ===
At various times in its history, Brentano's had stores outside of the United States. Under the leadership of Arthur Brentano, Brentano's had stores in Paris and London. Although the Brentano family owned the European stores, the stores were not a part of the same corporation that had owned the American stores and were not affected by the 1933 bankruptcy. It is not known when the Brentano family sold its interest in either store.

Both of these stores were frequented by American expatriates. Brentano's also used these stores as a way to distribute American newspapers and books by American authors that were not well-known outside of the United States, many of which were reprinted in Europe by Brentano's, to Europeans.

According to an 1887 New York Times article, the Paris store (Brentano's S.A.) was first opened on the Avenue de l'Opéra in 1887 by Arthur Brentano. This store was closed during the German occupation but was one of the first American owned businesses to reopen after the Liberation of Paris.

The Brentano's on Avenue de l'Opéra in Paris closed in 2009 but was bought and reopened in 2010 by Iranian businessman Farock Sharifi.

The London store (Brentano's Ltd.) first opened in 1889. When that store opened, there were stores in New York, Chicago, Washington and Paris. According in a 1927 article in The Washington Post, the London store might have been replaced by a publishing office by that time.

=== Canada ===
Under Macmillan, Brentano's opened its first and only Canadian store in Toronto in 1975. This store had the distinction of being the only American-owned bookstore with a physical location within Canada. This store was closed shortly after Brentano's had filed for bankruptcy in 1982.

== Publishing ==
From its headquarters at 586 Fifth Avenue, Brentano's became a publisher, with a specialization in French literature that led it to publish under the imprint "Éditions Brentano's" many titles by French writers in exile during the Vichy France period.

In an attempt to prevent possible liquidation of the company, the publishing department was sold to Coward-McCann in 1933.

== See also ==
- Kroch's and Brentano's
- Books in the United States
