= Eric Flint bibliography =

Cataloging of published works by Eric Flint

This is complete list of works by American science fiction and historical fiction author Eric Flint (1947–2022).

== Bibliography ==
=== Non-fiction academic publication ===
- Flint, Eric (1970). "Trade and Politics in Barotseland during the Kololo Period". The Journal of African History. 11 (1): 71–86. doi:10.1017/S0021853700037440. JSTOR 180217. S2CID 153402158.

=== Belisarius series ===
Written in collaboration with David Drake, the series features historical characters, including Roman general Belisarius, whom the authors present as possibly the best general to ever walk the earth.

Novels in the series include:

1. An Oblique Approach (1998), ISBN 0-671-87865-4
2. In the Heart of Darkness (1998), ISBN 0-671-87885-9
3. Destiny's Shield (1999), ISBN 0-671-57817-0
4. Fortune's Stroke (2000), ISBN 0-671-57871-5
5. The Tide of Victory (2001), ISBN 0-671-31996-5
6. The Dance of Time (2006), ISBN 1-4165-0931-3

=== Assiti Shards universes ===
The Assiti Shards refers to a literary mechanism which exchanges one volume of space-time with another. This manifests as both a time-swap and place-swap for the two places affected. The literary technique can be read about in detail in Assiti Shards effect, but when it first reached print in 1632, the technique spawned a huge surge of fan interest which grew. Flint had at least two other milieus planned utilizing the mechanism in 2000, but because of demand for works in the 1632 universe, he temporarily shelved them through the period 2001–05. They were known to be in production for some intervals in some part and manner in 2005–06, but the death of Jim Baen or other projects has apparently delayed them.

A second Assiti Shard effects tale, Time Spike, was published in 2008 with a third Assiti Shard effects tale, The Alexander Inheritance, following in 2017.

In the late winter of 2005–06, Baen started listing all the 1632-verse books under the umbrella series title Assiti Shards series and continues to do so, after previously listing them under Ring of Fire, for the only series thus far published, so 1632 (numbering 10 works in print, thirty Gazettes (XXX came out in October 2010) and climbing rapidly bi-monthly) is currently listed on Baen's under the pseudo misnomer Assiti Shards series, of which there are (will be) four milieus planned, not just the original. Yet Amazon and Barnes and Noble lists "Ring of Fire" for some books in the series, and "Assiti Shards series" for others. As of early October 2007, the series name of the 1632 books is still confused; Barnes and Noble has seemingly grouped them under Ring of Fire series, Amazon and other web sellers are mixed, and the book covers of the last six hardcover releases avoid the question entirely on the dust jacket and artwork. At the moment, we use the term 1632 series, and other books in the series can be reached via that main article or by the navigation strip at the page bottom.

==== The 1632 series ====
Once also known on the internet as the 163x series, Baen for a time called the Ring of Fire series, and it is as frequently called the 1632 Universe or 1632verse; however it is named, it is a best-selling success. The alternate history series starts when the inhabitants of a small town in the United States find themselves transported back to Central Germany, in the late spring (May) of 1631 with no way back. The first book title results because while the tale builds in 1631, the climax occurs when events in the Thirty Years' War nearly overrun the town in 1632.

- 1632 (February 2000), which successfully initiated the series. Primary characters and setting are in fictional Grantville, West Virginia, now part of Thuringia.
- 1633 (August 2002) with David Weber; co-sequel with the following Ring of Fire anthology.
- Ring of Fire (January 2004); first of many 1632 canonical anthologies, currently supplemented by the Grantville Gazettes. For a while the title of this work was used as the series name.
- 1634: The Galileo Affair (April 2004) with Andrew Dennis; this work takes stories from four Ring of Fire short stories and launches the second major storyline (called a 'thread' by Flint), centered on Italy.
- Grantville Gazette I print release, November 2004
- Grantville Gazette II print release, March 2006
- 1634: The Ram Rebellion (April 2006) with author-historian and key 1632 Research Committee member Virginia DeMarce. Together with stories from Ring of Fire and several Grantville Gazettes, this work takes a grassroots view at the peasants movement centered in Upper Palatinate, though it spends much time in Grantville, WV.
- 1634: The Baltic War (May 2007) with David Weber; writing schedule conflicts between Flint and Weber delayed this sequel. This novel closes out many loose ends left hanging in the Central Europe threads predecessor novel: 1633.
- 1635: The Cannon Law (October 2006) with Andrew Dennis; Sequel to 1634: The Galileo Affair
- 1634: The Bavarian Crisis (October 2007) with Virginia DeMarce
- Ring of Fire II (January 2008) anthology
- 1635: The Dreeson Incident (December 2008) with Virginia DeMarce
- 1635: The Eastern Front (October 2010)
- 1635: The Papal Stakes (October 2012) with Charles E. Gannon; Sequel to 1635: The Cannon Law
- 1635: A Parcel of Rogues (January 2016) with Andrew Dennis
- 1636: The Saxon Uprising (April 2011)
- Ring of Fire III (July 2011) anthology
- 1636: The Kremlin Games (March 2013) with Gorg Huff and Paula Goodlett
- 1636: The Devil's Opera (October 2013) with David Carrico; a crime story in Magdeburg
- 1636: Commander Cantrell in the West Indies (June 2014) with Charles E. Gannon
- 1636: The Viennese Waltz (November 2014) with Gorg Huff and Paula Goodlett
- 1636: The Cardinal Virtues (July 2015) with Walter Hunt
- 1636: The Ottoman Onslaught (January 2017)
- 1636: Mission to the Mughals (April 2017) with Griffin Barber
- 1636: The Vatican Sanction (December 2017) with Charles E. Gannon
- 1637: The Volga Rules (February 2018) with Gorg Huff and Paula Goodlett
- 1637: The Polish Maelstrom (April 2019)
- 1636: The China Venture (September 2019) with Iver Cooper
- 1636: The Atlantic Encounter (August 2020) with Walter H. Hunt
- 1637: No Peace Beyond the Line (November 2020) with Charles E. Gannon
- 1637: The Peacock Throne (May 2021) with Griffin Barber
- 1637: The Coast of Chaos (December 2021) with Paula Goodlett and Gorg Huff, plus authors of seven related and intertwining short stories
- Books release after Flint's death:

- 1637: The Transylvanian Decision (November 2022) with Robert E. Waters
- 1638: The Sovereign States (September 2023) with Paula Goodlett and Gorg Huff
- 1635: The Weaver's Code (October 2024) with Jody Lynn Nye

- The Grantville Gazettes

The Grantville Gazette began as an experimental eMagazine collated as an anthology featuring primarily fan fiction and non-fiction background essays similar to encyclopedia articles. These fact articles, which include reference sections, were developed by the various sub-committees of the very informal 1632 Research Committee and the input (feedback and criticisms) received on the internet web-forum 1632 Tech Manual which is part of Baen's Bar. These essays and the feedback were pertinent to the developing milieu along with input from other established authors—a massive case of collaborative fiction writing—the foundation for which was in turn in part being developed on Baen's Bar by those same fans commenting, manning the committees, doing research much like contributing to a wiki, and then submitting the results to peer review and criticism on 1632 Comments or 1632 Tech Manual.

The self-funding eMagazine Gazettes were edited by Eric Flint up through issue six (VI) along with a volunteer Editorial Board, many members of which assisted him closely in designing the development of the milieu, building and running the canonical website 1632.org and the many research topics leading to decisions within the whole collaboration. While later using his assistant and direct employee Paula Goodlett as an assistant editor, Flint retained full editorial control of the 1632 milieu and all its intellectual property rights.

The Grantville Gazette anthologies were also published by Baen, beginning with an initial publication as a serialized eMagazine over three months, followed by an e-book release (downloadable in various electronic formats) at Webscription.net, but a mass market trade paperback edition of the first issue was published as an experiment in November 2004. The first printing sold out, and reprintings followed. The second issue was released in a hardcover edition in early March 2006, and also sold well. Beginning with issue 11 the Grantville Gazette went pro. It went to a bimonthly schedule starting on May 1, 2007 and paid pro rates.

- Grantville Gazette I, Issue 1 (Electronic edition Nov 2003, paper edition November 2004, both published under the title The Grantville Gazette)
- Grantville Gazette II, Issue 2 (Electronic edition Mar 2004, hardcover edition March 2006)
- Grantville Gazette III, Issue 3 (Electronic edition October 2004, hardcover edition January 2007)
- Grantville Gazette IV, Issue 4 (Electronic edition mid April 2005, hardcover edition June 2008)
- Grantville Gazette V, Issue 5 (Electronic edition August 2005, hardcover edition August 2009)
- Grantville Gazette VI, Issue 6 (Electronic edition March 2006)
- Grantville Gazette VII, Issue 7 (Electronic edition April 2006)
- Grantville Gazette VIII, Issue 8 (Electronic edition July 2006)
- Grantville Gazette IX, Issue 9 (Electronic edition September 2006)
- Grantville Gazette X, Issue 10 (Electronic edition December 2006)
- Grantville Gazette XI, Issue 11 (Electronic edition May 2007)
- Grantville Gazette XII, Issue 12 (Electronic edition July 2007)
- Grantville Gazette XIII, Issue 13 (Electronic edition September 2007)
The Grantville Gazette official ceased publication on August 16, 2022, when Lucille Robbins, the widow of Eric Flint, officially announced that the Grantville Gazette was not economical viable without Eric Flint's participation. At the time of announcement, the final electronic issue, Volume 102, was released in July 2022, while the final hardcopy book version, Grantville Gazette IX (ISBN 978-1982125455), was released in July 2021.

==== Queen of the Seas series ====
The two book Queen of the Seas series is about a 21st-century cruise ship that is transported back to 4th century BCE Mediterranean just after the death of Alexander the Great.

- The Alexander Inheritance (July 2017) with Gorg Huff and Paula Goodlett, ISBN 978-1-4814-8248-6
- The Macedonian Hazard (January 2021) with Gorg Huff and Paula Goodlett, ISBN 978-1982125103

==== Other Assiti Shards universes ====
Other "Assiti Shards" universes which share only the time travel mechanism, but not the setting of the 1632 universe include the following novels:

- Time Spike (May 2008) with Marilyn Kosmatka, ISBN 978-1-4165-5538-4.
- By Any Other Name (unpublished) with Sarah Hoyt (Hoyt's first draft complete; Flint's part of the writing scheduled in Oct 2007 by Eric Flint "for sometime the coming year"; Publication date was to be no earlier than very late 2008). Book remained unpublished.

=== Heirs of Alexandria series ===
(with Dave Freer and Mercedes Lackey) Set in an alternate "Venetian Empire" in which magic thrives. (Note, a significant amount of text, and a couple of major characters in this work are adapted from stories written by Lackey in the Merovingen Nights shared universe series. That series was started by C. J. Cherryh in her novel Angel with the Sword.)

- The Shadow of the Lion, March 2002, Baen Books, ISBN 0-7434-3523-0
- This Rough Magic, December 2003, Baen Books, ISBN 0-7434-7149-0
- A Mankind Witch, July 2005, Baen Books, ISBN 0-7434-9913-1
- Much Fall of Blood, 2010, Baen Books, ISBN 978-1-4391-3351-4
- Burdens of the Dead, 2013, Baen Books, ISBN 978-1-4516-3874-5
- All the Plagues of Hell, December 2018, Baen Books, ISBN 978-1-4814-8361-2

=== Jao Empire series ===
- The Course of Empire (2003) with K. D. Wentworth, ISBN 0-7434-7154-7
- The Crucible of Empire (2010) with K. D. Wentworth, ISBN 978-1-4391-3338-5
- The Span of Empire (September 2016) with David Carrico, ISBN 978-1-4767-8153-2

=== Joe's World series ===
- The Philosophical Strangler (2001), ISBN 0-671-31986-8
- Forward the Mage (2002) with Richard Roach, ISBN 0-7434-3524-9

=== Karres series ===
- The Wizard of Karres (2004) with Dave Freer and Mercedes Lackey; a sequel to Schmitz's Witches of Karres, ISBN 0-7434-8839-3
- The Sorceress of Karres (2010) with Dave Freer, ISBN 978-1-4391-3307-1
- The Shaman of Karres (May 2020) with Dave Freer, ISBN 978-1982124564

=== Pyramid series ===
- Pyramid Scheme (2001) with Dave Freer, ISBN 0-671-31839-X
- Pyramid Power (2007) with Dave Freer, ISBN 978-1-4165-2130-3

=== Rats, Bats and Vats series ===
- Rats, Bats and Vats (2000) with Dave Freer, ISBN 0-671-31940-X
- The Rats, the Bats and the Ugly (September 2004) with Dave Freer, ISBN 0-7434-8846-6

=== Trail of Glory series ===
- 1812: The Rivers of War (2005), ISBN 978-0-345-46568-9
- 1824: The Arkansas War (2006), ISBN 9780345465696

=== Boundary series ===
- Boundary (March 2006) with Ryk E. Spoor, ISBN 978-1-4165-0932-5
- Threshold (June 2010) with Ryk E. Spoor; sequel to Boundary, ISBN 978-1-4391-3360-6
- Portal (May 2013) with Ryk E. Spoor second sequel to Boundary), ISBN 978-1-4516-3896-7

=== Castaway series ===
- Castaway Planet (February 2015) with Ryk E. Spoor; third sequel to Boundary, start of a new trilogy in the same universe), ISBN 978-1-4767-8027-6
- Castaway Odyssey (October 2016) with Ryk E. Spoor; sequel to Castaway Planet, ISBN 978-1-4767-8181-5
- Castaway Resolution (March 2020) with Ryk E. Spoor; sequel to Castaway Odyssey, ISBN 978-1982124410

=== Demon Rift series ===
- "The Problem with Demons" (March 2018) with Gorg Huff and Paula Goodlett, a short story published in the Universe Annex section of Volume #76 of the electronic version of the Grantville Gazette
- The Demons of Paris (March 2018) with Gorg Huff and Paula Goodlett, ISBN 978-1-9803-4414-8
- The Demons of Constantinople (May 2020) with Gorg Huff and Paula Goodlett, ISBN 978-1948818889

=== Further collaborations ===
- Honor Harrington series stories/novels (with David Weber)
  - Changer of Worlds (2001); anthology), ISBN 0-671-31975-2
  - Crown of Slaves (2003), ISBN 0-7434-7148-2
  - Torch of Freedom (2009), ISBN 1-4391-3305-0
  - Cauldron of Ghosts (2014), ISBN 978-1-4767-3633-4
  - To End in Fire (2021), ASIN B09HJBVD4H
- The Gods of Sagittarius (March 2017) with Mike Resnick, ASIN B06Y5KMYKW (might be the start of a new series)
- Iron Angels (September 2017) with FBI Special Agent and Gazette author Alistair Kimble, ISBN 978-1-4814-8256-1 - Urban fantasy detective novel
- Venus, Mars and Hell (July 2019) with John Lambshead, ISBN 978-1948818476
- Council of Fire (November 2019) with Walter H. Hunt, ISBN 978-1982124151 - Second book in the Arcane America series that was started by Kevin J. Anderson and Sarah Hoyt.
- Fenrir (June 2025) with Ryk E. Spoor, ISBN 978-1-6680-7266-0

=== Anthologies ===
- The Dragon Done It (March 2008) with Mike Resnick; anthology, ISBN 1-4165-5528-5
- When Diplomacy Fails (November 2008) with Mike Resnick; anthology, ISBN 978-0-9759-1566-0

=== Solo novels ===
- Mother of Demons (1997), ISBN 0-671-87800-X

=== Collections ===
- Worlds (2009), ISBN 978-1-4165-9142-9
- Worlds Two (August 2018), ISBN 9781481483414

=== Short fiction ===
- In the Honor Harrington Universe
  - From the Highlands (short novel), in the Worlds of Honor Anthologies #3: Changer of Worlds with David Weber 2001, ISBN 0-671-31975-2
  - Fanatic (novella) in The Service of the Sword, 2003, ISBN 0-7434-3599-0
- Other Stories
  - The Islands (novella) in Warmasters, an anthology, 2002, ISBN 0-7434-3534-6
  - "Entropy and the Strangler" (short story), in Writers of the Future Volume IX, edited by Dave Wolverton September 1993, ISBN 978-0884048237
  - "The Thief and the Roller Derby Queen" (short story), in The Chick is in the Mail, edited by Esther Friesner, 2000, ISBN 0-671-31950-7
  - "The Truth about the Götterdämmerung" (short story), in Turn the Other Chick, edited by Esther Friesner, 2004, ISBN 0-7434-8857-1
  - Carthago Delenda Est (novella), in Foreign Legions, edited by David Drake, 2001, ISBN 0-671-31990-6

=== Classic SF reissues edited by Eric Flint ===
- Works of Christopher Anvil
  - Pandora's Legions (2002), ISBN 0-671-31861-6
  - Interstellar Patrol (2003), ISBN 0-7434-3600-8
  - Interstellar Patrol II: The Federation of Humanity (2005), ISBN 0-7434-9892-5
  - The Trouble with Aliens (2006), collection, ISBN 1-4165-2077-5
  - The Trouble with Humans (2007), collection, ISBN 978-1-4165-2142-6
  - War Games (2008), ISBN 1-4165-5602-8
  - Prescription for Chaos (2008), ISBN 1-4165-9143-5
  - The Power of Illusion (2010), ISBN 1-4391-3412-X
- Works of Randall Garrett
  - Lord Darcy (2002), co-edited with Guy Gordon, ISBN 0-7434-3548-6
- Works of Tom Godwin
  - The Cold Equations and Other Stories (2003), ISBN 0-7434-3601-6
- Works of Keith Laumer
  - Retief (2002), ISBN 0-671-31857-8
  - Odyssey (2002), ISBN 0-7434-3527-3
  - Keith Laumer: The Lighter Side (2002), ISBN 0-7434-3537-0
  - Future Imperfect (2003), ISBN 0-7434-3606-7
  - A Plague of Demons (2003), ISBN 0-7434-3588-5
  - Legions of Space (2004), ISBN 0-7434-8855-5
  - Imperium (2005), ISBN 0-7434-9903-4
  - The Universe Twister (2008), ISBN 978-1-4165-5597-1
- Works of Keith Laumer and Rosel George Brown
  - Earthblood & Other Stories (2012), ISBN 978-1-4516-3820-2
- Works of Murray Leinster
  - Med Ship: The Complete Stories (2002), co-edited with Guy Gordon, ISBN 0-7434-3555-9
  - Planets of Adventure (2003), ISBN 0-7434-7162-8
  - A Logic Named Joe (2005), ISBN 0-7434-9910-7
- Works of Howard L. Myers
  - The Creatures of Man (2003), co-edited with Guy Gordon, ISBN 0-7434-3607-5
  - A Sense of Infinity (2009), co-edited with Guy Gordon, ISBN 978-1-4391-3278-4
- Works of James H. Schmitz co-edited with Guy Gordon
  - Telzey Amberdon (2000), ISBN 0-671-57851-0
  - TnT: Telzey & Trigger Together (2000), ISBN 0-671-57879-0
  - Trigger & Friends (2001), ISBN 0-671-31966-3
  - The Hub: Dangerous Territory (2001), ISBN 0-671-31984-1
  - Agent of Vega & Other Stories (2001), ISBN 0-671-31847-0
  - Eternal Frontier (2002), ISBN 0-7434-3559-1
  - The Witches of Karres (2003), ISBN 0-7434-8837-7
- Works of A. E. van Vogt
  - Transgalactic (2006), co-edited with David Drake, ISBN 978-1-4165-2089-4
