= List of books in the 1632 series =

Alternative history novels by Eric Flint

The following is a list of publications in the 1632 series of alternate history fiction. For Grantville Gazettes (2003–2022) magazine series, please see The Grantville Gazettes. For the current magazine (since 2023), please see 1632 & Beyond.

== Novels published by Baen Books ==
Title	Publication date	Authors	ISBN	Notes
1632	February 2000	Eric Flint	0-671-57849-9	The first work in the 1632 series. Grantville, West Virginia, in the year 2000, is transposed within an area of southern Thuringia of Germany in the 1630s. Grantvillers subsequently take on the Holy Roman Empire's troops in the Thirty Years' War, to maintain their own town's integrity.
1633	August 2002	David Weber and Eric Flint	0-7434-3542-7	The direct sequel to 1632. Grantville joins sides with Gustavus Adolphus, and tries to recreate the Germanies in the image of the United States.
1634: The Galileo Affair	April 2004	Eric Flint & Andrew Dennis	0-7434-8815-6	First book of the South European thread. A diplomatic and trade mission to the Italies goes awry when youngsters attached to the mission decide to rescue Galileo from the Inquisition, and end up in a plot to assassinate the Pope. The plot is hatched by a French operative turned rebel, who wishes to destroy France to allow the rise of the Huguenots.
1635: The Cannon Law	October 2006	Eric Flint & Andrew Dennis	1-4165-0938-0	The direct sequel to The Galileo Affair. Cardinal Borja, incensed with the behavior of Pope Urban, decides to assassinate the Pope and his political allies and to have himself declared the new Pope. Though Borja manages to take over the Vatican and establish quorum with cowed Cardinals, the old Pope escapes.
1634: The Baltic War	May 2007	Eric Flint & David Weber	1-4165-2102-X	The direct sequel to 1633. Western Europe maneuvers to contain Gustavus Adolphus, resulting in a naval battle in the Baltic, and the conquest of Denmark by Sweden, and victory for Grantville's navy of ironclads.
1634: The Bavarian Crisis	October 2007	Eric Flint & Virginia DeMarce	978-1-4165-4253-7	The direct sequel to The Baltic War. The Prince Cardinal Infante of Spain takes on vice-regal duties in the Spanish Netherlands, then decides to separate from Spain and declare himself King. With the aide of Grantvillers, he acquires a bride in the rebellious daughter of the Holy Roman Emperor, Duchess Anna Maria.
1635: The Dreeson Incident	December 2008	Eric Flint & Virginia DeMarce	1-4165-5589-7	A sequel to The Galileo Affair and The Bavarian Crisis. A French Huguenot rebel plots to blame Cardinal Richelieu for an attack on Grantville. Focuses chiefly on the lives of mid-level government employees and private citizens of Grantville following the end of those prior novels, and leading to major political changes throughout the USE.
1635: The Eastern Front	October 2010	Eric Flint	1-4391-3389-1	A sequel to The Baltic War. Sweden and USE invade Poland, Gustavus Adolphus is seriously injured, and the invasion comes to a halt. Episodes five and six of The Anaconda Project, an interrupted series in Grantville Gazette volumes 12–21, were incorporated into chapters four and five of 1635: The Eastern Front.
1636: The Saxon Uprising	April 2011	Eric Flint	978-1439134252	Direct sequel to The Eastern Front. Oxenstierna usurps the power of USE parliament, sides with the nobility, and forces the country into a civil war which is ultimately won by supporters of FoJP and CoC led by Mike Stearns.
1636: The Kremlin Games	June 2012	Eric Flint, Gorg Huff, and Paula Goodlett	978-1451637762	Novelization of the Butterflies in the Kremlin stories, originally published in The Grantville Gazettes. Bernie Zeppi takes a job as technical adviser to the Russians' attempt to bootstrap themselves into an industrial revolution.
1635: The Papal Stakes	October 2012	Eric Flint & Charles E. Gannon	978-1451638394	Direct sequel to The Cannon Law. The Pope is pursued across Italian countryside by assassins sent by Borja, while the USE mounts commando raids to rescue Frank Stone and his wife from Spanish captivity.
1636: The Devil's Opera	October 2013	Eric Flint & David Carrico	978-1451639285	A semi-detective novel set in Magdeburg, from December 1635 to March 1636.
1636: Commander Cantrell in the West Indies	June 2014	Eric Flint & Charles E. Gannon	978-1476736785	Start of the naval thread. Eddie Cantrell and Anne Cathrine marry and are sent by Admiral Simpson to the Caribbean, to secure access to the Jennings Oil Field. Naval battle ensues with the Spanish and settlers which ends in a standoff.
1636: The Viennese Waltz	November 2014	Eric Flint, Paula Goodlett, and Gorg Huff	978-1476736877	Sequel to Barbie Consortium stories, continues directly with some characters from Saxon Uprising. The Barbie Consortium travel to Vienna as part of a plan to fix the Austro-Hungarian economy and defend its future. Meanwhile, the Ottomans, flush with victory, turn their gaze to Europe and their old enemy.
1636: The Cardinal Virtues	July 2015	Eric Flint & Walter H. Hunt	978-1476780610	A sequel to The Baltic War and Commander Cantrell in the West Indies. Cardinal Richelieu's position in France is further threatened by Gaston, the younger brother of King Louis XIII, while the same monarch and his wife devise a plan to protect the throne from his ambitious brother and enemies. This book was a finalist for the 2016 Dragon Award for Best Alternate History Novel.
1635: A Parcel of Rogues	January 2016	Eric Flint & Andrew Dennis	978-1476781099	Sequel to The Baltic War, following characters left in Britain. Cromwell and the Americans flee north to Scotland to escape King Charles of England and his new Prime Minister the Earl of Cork. This book was a finalist for the 2016 Dragon Award for Best Alternate History Novel.
1636: The Ottoman Onslaught	January 2017	Eric Flint	978-1476781846	Direct sequel to both 1636: The Saxon Uprising and 1636: The Viennese Waltz. The USE's war with Poland enters a new stage while the invasion of Bavaria comes to a conclusion. Meanwhile, the Ottoman Empire comes ever closer to their long-sought goal of capturing Vienna. This book was a finalist for the 2017 Dragon Award for Best Alternate History Novel.
1636: Mission to the Mughals	April 2017	Eric Flint & Griffin Barber	978-1476782140	A delegation from the USE is sent to the Mughal Empire to secure both trade deals and establish a new trade route. All the while, various elements in the royal court scheme to usurp Shah Jahan.
1636: The Vatican Sanction	December 2017	Eric Flint & Charles E. Gannon	978-1481482776	Sequel to The Papal Stakes. Urban VIII pulls together a consistory as a mini-Vatican II and is then assassinated. Cardinal Bedmar is elected as the new Pope but Borja still occupies the Vatican. Results in a deep divide within Catholicism; Spain, Poland, Bavaria go for Borja in Rome, deep division within Austria.
1637: The Volga Rules	February 2018	Eric Flint, Paula Goodlett, and Gorg Huff	978-1481483032	Sequel to The Kremlin Games. Czar Michael Romanov and his supporters withstand the siege of Ufa, his new capitol. The Czar sends envoys beyond the Urals and establishes a Constitutional Convention for a new Russian Empire.
1637: The Polish Maelstrom	April 2019	Eric Flint	978-1481483896	Sequel to 1636: The Ottoman Onslaught. The Ottomans continue with their invasion of Austria. At the same time, Saxony seized control of Lower Silesia, a region that has been in dispute with Poland for almost a century. Polish revolutionaries seized control of Galicia while Bohemia also became involved in that regional conflict. Includes (parts from) The Anaconda Project, an interrupted series in Grantville Gazette volumes 12–21.
1636: The China Venture	September 2019	Eric Flint & Iver Cooper	978-1481484237	Can uptimers, with their knowledge of the future, prevent the destruction of the Ming Empire by the Manchu that led to large-scale massacres (such as the 1645 Yangzhou massacre) in our timeline?
1636: The Atlantic Encounter	August 2020	Eric Flint & Walter H. Hunt	978-1982124755	Novel set in French North America
1637: No Peace Beyond the Line	November 2020	Eric Flint & Charles E. Gannon	978-1982124960	The Spanish do not sit idle after the United States of Europe had sent ships into the Caribbean. Sequel to 1636: Commander Cantrell in the West Indies. 2021 Dragon Awards for Best Alternate History Novel winner.
1636: Calabar's War	April 2021	Charles E. Gannon & Robert E. Waters	978-1982125301	The evacuation of Dutch-held Northern Brazil.
1637: The Peacock Throne	May 2021	Eric Flint & Griffin Barber	978-1982125356	Sequel to 1636: Mission to the Mughals.
1637: Dr. Gribbleflotz and the Soul of Stoner	September 2021	Kerryn Offord & Rick Boatright	978-1982125608	A new novel by Offord and Boatright that is a sequel to the collection of short stories that was published as 1636: The Chronicles of Dr. Gribbleflotz. This material has not been previously released. This book was nominated for the 2022 Dragon Award for Best Alternate History Novel.
1637: The Transylvanian Decision	November 2022	Eric Flint & Robert E. Waters	978-1982192235	Following the events described in 1637: The Polish Maelstrom, the ruler of Transylvania request the assistance of Bohemia to help them overthrow their Ottoman overlords. First book to be released after Flint's death in July 2022.
1638: The Sovereign States	September 2023	Eric Flint, Paula Goodlett, and Gorg Huff	978-1982192877	Third mainline novel in the Russian thread and sequel to 1637: The Volga Rules. Civil war continues in Russia. The oligarchs traditionalists holding Moscow continue to fight the czar and his uptimer advisors. This is the second book to be released after Flint's death. This book was nominated for the 2024 Dragon Award for Best Alternate History Novel.
Security Solutions	April 2024	Bjorn Hasseler	978-1625799609	Fourth book in Hasseler's NESS series. Sequel to Security Threats.
1635: The Weaver's Code	October 2024	Eric Flint & Jody Lynn Nye	978-1982193669	The weaving industry in England is influence after contact with the Americans imprisoned in the Tower of London. This is the third book to be released after Eric Flint's death.
1637: The French Correction	March 2025	Eric Flint & Walter H. Hunt	978-1668072462	A sequel to 1636: The Cardinal Virtues. Civil war in France. After the unexpected death of King Louis XIII, who is the rightful ruler of France, Louis's younger brother Gaston, or Louis's newborn son Louis? This is the fourth book to be released after Flint's death.
1637: The Pacific Initiative	March 2025	Iver P. Cooper	978-1668072486	A sequel to the novella Rising Sun that was published in 1636: Seas of Fortune concerning the Japanese colony in the west coast of North America.
Red Shield	January 2026	Bethanne Kim	978-1-964856-47-6	Book about the Red Cross, Boy Scouts, and Girl Scouts. Includes a few characters from Kim's previous books.
1637: The Pilgrim's Passage	August 2026	Eric Flint & Griffin Barber	978-1668073346	A sequel to 1637: The Peacock Throne

== Anthologies published by Baen Books ==
Title	Publication date	Editor	ISBN	Notes
Ring of Fire I	January 2004	Eric Flint	0-7434-7175-X	Sequel to 1632 and prequel to 1633
1634: The Ram Rebellion	May 2006	Eric Flint and Virginia DeMarce	1-4165-2060-0	Several intertwining short stories combine to form a narrative that covers the overthrow of the ruling order by the common people, in a democracy drive, led by a political newspaper featuring a political cartoon starring a ram
Ring of Fire II	January 2008	Eric Flint	1-4165-7387-9	Second anthology of short stories
1635: The Tangled Web	December 2009	Virginia DeMarce	978-1-4391-3308-8	Several intertwining short stories combine to form a narrative that covers the development subsequent to the Ram Rebellion in Franconia.
Ring of Fire III	July 2011	Eric Flint	978-1439134481	Third anthology of short stories
1635: Music and Murder	September 2013	David Carrico	978-1625792143	Collection of stories previous published in the Gazettes and also Ring of Fire II & III; prequel to 1636: The Devil's Opera.
1636: Seas of Fortune	January 2014	Iver Cooper	978-1451639391	Composed of two novellas, Stretching Out (set in South America) and Rising Sun (focused on Japan)
1636: The Barbie Consortium	November 2014	Gorg Huff & Paula Goodlett	978-1625793584	The story of the Barbie Consortium, from its origins in competition with the Sewing Circle, to just before the climax of The Viennese Waltz. Much of the book is content originally published in the Grantville Gazette.
Ring of Fire IV	May 2016	Eric Flint	978-1476781242	Includes a short story by Hugo and Nebula awards winning author David Brin.
1636: The Chronicles of Dr. Gribbleflotz	August 2016	Kerryn Offord & Rick Boatright	978-1476781600	This book is about a character that was first developed by Offord and Boatright, and includes some material that was previous published in the electronic version of the Grantville Gazette plus additional new material. This book is followed by 1637: Dr. Gribbleflotz and the Soul of Stoner.
1635: The Wars for the Rhine	December 2016	Anette Pedersen	978-1476782225	Book is about a few characters which Pedersen introduced in the Ring of Fire I anthology and is also a sequel to 1635: The Tangled Web involving intrigue in the German states along the Rhine.
1636: Flight of the Nightingale	November 2019	David Carrico	978-1982124182	Includes two unrelated novellas, The Flight of the Nightingale and Bach to the Future. Some of the material is new while the rest was previously published in the Gazette. The first novella is a suspense thriller in which a downtime singer-songwriter being chased through Northern Italy while trying to escape to freedom in Grantville. The second novella is a serial that includes new material added to that was previously published six parts within issues 26 through 69 about the downtimer musician Johann Bach and his introduction to the music of his never-to-be-born grandnephew Johann Sebastian Bach.
1637: The Coast of Chaos	December 2021	Eric Flint, Paula Goodlett, and Gorg Huff	978-1982125776	A short novel by Flint, Goodlett and Huff plus seven inter-related short stories from several additional writers about the response by Dutch and English colonists and Native Americans in North America upon hearing about the impending French takeover of the former English colonies in North America. A partial follow-up to 1636: The Atlantic Encounter

== Other works ==
Title	Publication date	Editor/Author	ISBN	Notes
Eric Flint's 1632 Resource Guide and Role Playing Game	2004	Jonathan M. Thompson	0-9721419-4-4	Out of print since 2021.

== Books published by Ring of Fire Press ==
On August 16 2022, Lucille Robbins, the widow of Eric Flint, officially announced the immediate shutdown of both The Grantville Gazette and the Ring of Fire Press. Without a huge infusion of new cash, it was determined that both business ventures would not be economically viable without Flint's participation. As a result, all titles became out-of-print; ebook distribution had ceased, and the limited pre-existing stock of new paper editions at authorized retailers eventually disappeared.

Some authors, such as Bjorn Hasseler and Virginia DeMarce, have made arrangements with Baen Books to have Baen republish and distribute their books, while other authors, such as Gorg Huff and Paula Goodlett, have decided on the self-publishing route via Amazon (which limit distributions via third-party resellers). Since not all authors have found a new publisher, some titles might remain out-of-print for some time.

Posthumous re-publication of RoF books written by authors who have died would be very problematic unless the estates of the deceased authors are able to make arrangements with a new publisher. Books in this category will be difficult to get. Authors that may be included this group are Kevin H. Evans, Karen C. Evans, and Karen Bergstralh.

Title	Publication date	Authors	ISBN	Notes
Essen Steel	June 2013	Kim Mackey	978-1-4905-3062-8	Originally published as a serial in 3 parts in Gazette volumes 7–9 as The Essen Chronicles. Republished in 2025 by Baen Books. 978-1-964856-12-4
The Danish Scheme	June 2013	Herbert Sakalaucks and Eric Flint	978-1-4905-0290-8	Originally published as a serial in 9 parts in Gazette volumes 22, 23, 28–31, and 33–35 as Northwest Passage. Heavily rewritten and includes new material by Herbert Sakalaucks plus a new short story by Eric Flint.
Joseph Hanauer	June 2013	Douglas W. Jones	978-1-4905-3057-4	Originally published as a serial in 3 parts in Gazette volumes 8, 13, and 14.
No Ship for Tranquebar	June 2013	Kevin H. Evans and Karen C. Evans	978-1-4905-0290-8	Originally published as a serial in 4 parts in Gazette volumes 27–30.
Turn Your Radio On	June 2013	Wood Hughs	978-1-6257-9453-6	Originally published as a serial in 6 parts in Gazette volumes 19–24.
Second Chance Bird	June 2013	Garrett W. Vance	978-1-6257-9454-3	Originally published as a serial in 13 parts in Gazette volumes 32–41, and 43–45. Minor re-write from serial version. Book was rewritten and released in 2021 as Saving The Dodo.
Medicine and Disease after the Ring of Fire	June 2013	Vincent Coljee, Kim Mackey, Gus Kiritikos, Brad Banner, and Iver Cooper	978-1980726029	A collection of 8 separate non-fiction articles originally published in Gazette volumes 10, 26, 29, 34, 35, and 38.
Bartley's Man	August 2016	Paula Goodlett & Gorg Huff	978-1-5370-5233-5	Originally published as a serial in 3 parts in Gazette volumes 46–48. Re-written with new material added. Republished independently by authors in 2022. 979-8356564475
The Muse of Music	January 2017	Enrico Toro & David Carrico	978-1-5399-2322-0	Originally published as 7 related stories in Gazette volumes 2, 3, 5, 13, 31, 44, 45, and 46 under various titles. Includes 2 non-fiction articles. Republished in 2025 by Baen Books. 978-1-964856-11-7
Love and Chemistry	February 2017	Jack Carroll & Edith Wild	978-1-5428-0115-7	Originally published as a serial in 6 parts in Gazette volumes 49–54 as The Undergraduate. Re-written with new material added.
1635: The Battle for Newfoundland	January 2018	Herbert Sakalaucks	978-1-6257-9657-8	Sequel to The Danish Scheme. New material. First novel published by the press from unpublished material.
Essen Defiant	March 2018	Kim Mackey & David Carrico	978-1-9804-8249-9	Sequel to Mackey's Essen Steel. New material that has never been previously published. This book also help set up the events that led to the beginning to Pedersen's book 1635: The Wars for the Rhine that was first published in 2016. Republished in 2025 by Baen Books. 978-1-964856-13-1
The Monster Society	April 2018	Eric S. Brown, Robert E. Waters, and Anna G. Carpenter	978-1-9808-6473-8	Originally published as a serial in 8 parts in Gazette volumes 61–71 plus one original installment with a promise that the storyline introduced in the new story would be continued in the Gazette.
Letters From Gronow	May 2018	David Carrico	978-1-9829-7896-9	Originally published as a serial in 6 parts in Gazette volumes 70–75. Includes new material that continues the story. Republished in 2024 by Baen Books. 978-1-964856-10-0
The Persistence of Dreams	May 2018	Meriah L. Crawford & Robert E. Waters	978-1-9829-5233-4	Originally published as a series of semi-related short stories about painter Daniel Block in Gazette volumes 46, 50, 60, 61, 62, and 67. The short story The Winter Canvas: A Daniel Block Story was awarded the Gazette's Best of 2016 Award. Includes minor changes.
The Hunt for The Red Cardinal	June 2018	Bradley H. Sinor & Susan P. Sinor	978-1948818056	Includes a new novel that is an expansion of their D'Artagnan short stories that were published in Gazette volumes 10 and 41, and Ring of Fire III, which are also included.
The Chrysanthemum, the Cross, and the Dragon	August 2018	Iver Cooper	978-1948818117	New novel containing original unpublished material about the invasion of the Spanish Philippines by the Dutch and Japanese, an event that was briefly hinted at in Cooper's previous work 1636: Seas of Fortune, and also about the peaceful transfer of Spanish Formosa (northern Taiwan) to Zheng Zhilong, a private merchant and an admiral in the Ming navy, approximately 30 years ahead of schedule. Republished in 2024 by Baen Books. 978-1-948818-11-7
The Legions of Pestilence	April 2019	Virginia DeMarce	978-1948818353	Includes material that was previously published in six parts in volumes 52–57 of the Gazette as An Uneasy Kind of Peace with new material about the development and growth of the buffer state between France and the USE called the County of Burgundy. Republished in 2024 by Baen Books. 978-1-62579-976-0
The Legend of Jimmy Dick	June 2019	Terry Howard	978-1948818438	Includes material that was previously published as short stories in the Gazette from volumes 5 through 35.
Up-time Pride and Down-time Prejudice	August 2019	Mark H. Huston	978-1948818490	New material that has a 1632 twist on the similarly named Jane Austen novel. This book was a finalist for the 2020 Dragon Award for Best Alternate History Novel. Will be Republished in May 2026 by Baen Books.
A Red Son Rises in the West	September 2019	John Deakins & Herb Sakalaucks	978-1948818551	A new and not previously published novel about a young Native American's journey to Grantville and back to his homeland in what is now New England.
The Trouble with Huguenots	November 2019	Virginia DeMarce	978-1948818636	Adventures of the Dr. Seuss loving Duke Henri de Rohan and his family that was previously published in several issues of the Grantville Gazette and Ring of Fire IV plus new material. Republished in 2024 by Baen Books. 978-1-62579-977-7
Magdeburg Noir	January 2020	David Carrico	978-1948818674	Another Carrico 1632 police drama; a follow-up to 1635: Music and Murder and 1636: The Devil's Opera. Material that was previously published in the Grantville Gazette plus some new material. Republished in 2025 by Baen Books. 978-1-964856-09-4
A Holmes For the Czar	February 2020	Paula Goodlett & Gorg Huff	978-1948818711	A detective story set in Goodlett and Huff's Russian sub-thread that started with 1636: The Kremlin Games and 1637: The Volga Rules. New material. Two Cases for the Czar is the sequel to this book. (Republished independently by authors in 2022. 979-8358594364)
Fire on the Rio Grande	March 2020	Kevin H. Evans & Karen C. Evans	978-1948818803	An Encyclopædia Britannica article from Grantville introduces new ideas to remote the Spanish North American outpost of Santa Fe de Nuevo México. Would the Pueblo Revolt of 1680 occur ahead of schedule with the same deadly results? New material.
A Red Son: Not Without Honor	July 2020	John Deakins	978-1953034007	Sequel to A Red Son Rises in the West. New material.
Tales From the Mermaid and Tiger: Engines of Change	September 2020	Kevin H. Evans & Karen C. Evans	978-1953034083	A compilation of 7 short stories that were previous published in the Gazette from volumes 55 through 66 that centered around the chocolate and uptimer-style food cafe that is operated in Copenhagen by uptimer Reva Pridmore plus new material that bind the separate stories together to create a unified narrative.
Things Could Be Worse: The Pastor Kastenmayer Stories	October 2020	Virginia DeMarce	978-1953034205	New and old material. Republished in 2024 by Baen Books. 978-1-62579-978-4
Two Cases for the Czar	November 2020	Paula Goodlett & Gorg Huff	978-1953034281	Sequel to A Holmes For the Czar. Another mysterious death has occurred in Russia which only the Czar's detective can solve. (Republished independently by authors in 2022. 979-8359078610)
Designed to Fail	December 2020	Virginia DeMarce	978-1953034403	Prince Frederik of Denmark, the second son of King Christian IV, gets appointed the governor of the new province of Westphalia in the USE. There is no end to problems, and he suspects his appointment was designed to fail. Republished in 2024 by Baen Books. 978-1-62579-979-1
The Grantville Inquisitor	January 2021	Bradley H. Sinor and Tracy S. Morris	978-1953034441	Collection of short stories about the adventures of two reporters working for the Grantville Inquisitor. Mostly new material based upon characters that was first introduced in the Ring of Fire II anthology and various issues of the Gazette.
A Matter of Security	March 2021	Bjorn Hasseler	978-1953034649	Down-time ex-mercenaries form a security firm based upon uptime principles. Includes new material plus material previously published in the Gazette. Republished in 2024 by Baen Books. 978-1-62579-957-9
A Mission for the Czar	June 2021	Gorg Huff & Paula Goodlett	978-1953034908	Sequel to Two Cases for the Czar. Vasilii and Miroslava returns to solve another case. (Republished independently by authors in 2022. 979-8361828845)
Missions of Security	June 2021	Bjorn Hasseler	978-1953034786	Sequel to A Matter of Security. Republished in 2024 by Baen Books. 978-1-62579-958-6
Saving The Dodo	July 2021	Garrett W. Vance	978-1953034984	Originally published in June 2013 as Second Chance Bird, but extensively rewritten with lots of new material. Republished in April 2026 by Baen Books. 978-1964856612
The Horsewoman	July 2021	Karen Bergstralh	978-1956015003	A commemorative publication of the late Bergstralh's complete work of short stories and non-fiction articles that were published in the Gazette (2003–2011).
Mrs. Flannery's Flowers	August 2021	Bethanne Kim	978-1956015089	A young college student's short visit to her parents' home in Grantville to do laundry in 2000 turns into an unexpected trip to 17th century Germany. Republished in 2025 by Baen Books. 978-1-964856-18-6
Security Threats	November 2021	Bjorn Hasseler	978-1956015324	New material. Sequel to Missions of Security. Republished in 2024 by Baen Books. 978-1-62579-959-3
A 1632 Christmas	December 2021	Edited by Walt Boyes, Joy Ward, and Bjorn Hasseler	978-1956015386	An anthology of 21 Christmas (and Hanukkah) related short stories in the 1632-verse by Eric Flint and his many collaborators. The short stories were re-released in two special issues of 1632 & Beyond as Special Issue #1 and Special Issue #2 that were released in November and December 2024 respectively.
The Gourmets of Grantville	December 2021	Bethanne Kim	978-1956015409	What happens when recipes and cooking techniques from 20th century America gets blended with 17th century German ingredients and culinary traditions? A Grantville version of fusion cuisine that would have inspired Wolfgang Puck. Republished in 2026 by Baen Books. 978-1-964856-18-6
The Marshals	January 2022	Mike Watson	978-1956015447	An expansion and continuation of the six stories that were first published in the Gazette volume 68 about the start of the SoTF marshals service in Suhl that serves the district court based in the same city. 19th century American southwest law enforcement solving crimes in 17th century Germany. Includes new material that bind the separate stories together to create a unified narrative. Republished in February 2026 by Baen Books. 978-1964856582
The Unexpected Sales Reps	February 2022	Virginia DeMarce	978-1956015485	A story about two not very successful con artists who decided to become spies. Or "How to succeed at spying without really trying..." Republished in 2024 by Baen Books. 978-1-62579-980-7
I Want to Be Your Hero	March 2022	Kerryn Offord	978-1956015669	Novelization of Offord's John Felix "Puss" Trelli short stories that appeared in the Gazette volumes 34, 35, 39, 47, 49, and 80. Will be Republished in May 2026 by Baen Books.
The Private Casefiles of Archie Gottesfreund	July 2022	David Carrico	979-8887450018	A story about a former half-Scot/half-German mercenary turned detective. Republished in 2024 by Baen Books. 978-1-964856-08-7

== Books self-published by Huff & Goodlett via Amazon ==
Title	Publication date	Authors	ISBN	Notes
A Diogenes Club for the Czar	December 2023	Gorg Huff and Paula Goodlett	979-8871505632	Fourth book in the Miroslava Holmes series. Sequel to A Mission for the Czar
