= 1634: The Bavarian Crisis =

2007 novel by Virginia DeMarce and Eric Flint

- Author: Virginia DeMarce and Eric Flint (series creator and editor)
- Cover artist: Tom Kidd
- Language: English
- Series: 1632 series
- Genre: Alternate history, science fiction
- Publisher: Baen Books
- Publication date: October 1, 2007
- Publication place: United States
- Media type: Print (hardback)
- Pages: 448 pp
- ISBN: 978-1-4165-4253-7
- OCLC: 144329893
- Dewey Decimal: 813/.54 22
- LC Class: PS3556.L548 A6175 2007
- Preceded by: 1634: The Baltic War and 1634: The Ram Rebellion and DeMarce short stories in The Grantville Gazettes, issues II, III, IV, V and VI
- Followed by: The Anaconda Project; Ring of Fire II; 1635: The Dreeson Incident

1634: The Bavarian Crisis is a novel in the alternate history 1632 series, written by Virginia DeMarce and Eric Flint as sequel to Flint's novella "The Wallenstein Gambit"; several short stories by DeMarce in The Grantville Gazettes; 1634: The Ram Rebellion; and 1634: The Baltic War. The novel's first draft was completed in 2005, before work on The Baltic War began. Many chapters of that "early draft version" were available online, but the final production reached print on October 1, 2007.

== Publication ==
DeMarce, who wrote Flint congratulating him on his research and verisimilitude found in the novel 1632 soon joined with him as an expert collaborator and is one of the regular contributing writers to 1632 Tech Manual, the canonical Grantville Gazettes and a key member of the 1632 Research Committee with a PhD in history and an international expert specialized in European Genealogy. Her stories regularly deal with historical social and social science matters, as may be expected from DeMarce's PhD dissertation about the 1525 German Peasants' War and her life work as a 17th-century European history specialist.

The Bavarian Crisis was delayed due to the delayed start and completion of the preceding major work in the set, The Baltic War. If The Bavarian Crisis had been published first, it would have contained plot spoilers for 1634: The Baltic War. As it begins concurrently with the events revealed in that book and that of 1634: The Galileo Affair as well as 1634: The Ram Rebellion, the overall scope of plot detail (historical canvas) in the series might be readily intuited. As it is, most of the narrative in all four novels span the same period of 1634, the late winter-to-early summer, though 1634: The Galileo Affair expends a few early chapters within the year 1633 as backdrop activities within the Catholic Church and Richelieu's offices are germane to the arch of the plotting.

== Plot summary ==
Early revelations detail machinations by the Habsburg heiress Archduchess Maria Anna of Austria (1610–1665) to gather information as aided and abetted by a dowager aunt and her younger sister behind the backs of her father Emperor Ferdinand II of the Holy Roman Empire and his Jesuit watchdogs. Duke Maximilian I, Elector of Bavaria becomes a widower in need of a suitable Catholic bride, while the Cardinal-Infante Ferdinand whose armies have reconquered 80–85% of the Low Countries by the summer of 1634 is contemplating a dynastic move of his own which his brother King Philip IV of Spain will find a bit disconcerting. Veronica Dreeson and Mary Simpson meanwhile plan a trip to tend to personal matters to the Upper Palatinate border region conquered by Gustavus Adolphus of Sweden and administered for him from Amberg by ally Duke Ernest of Saxe-Gotha, one of the four Wettin dukes that were supplanted by Grantville's (formation of the NUS) actions in 1631 and 1632. Events in the other 1634 novels (1634: The Galileo Affair, 1634: The Ram Rebellion, 1634: The Baltic War) are integrated into the action and political events behind the scenes, and this book ties a host of little oddities into a coherent canvas capturing a snapshot of the state of Europe in early summer of 1634.

Concurrent with their pet projects, Dreeson and Simpson women are accompanied by a trade delegation with the strategic goal of restoring the iron production of the Upper Palatinate to feed the war needs of the USE.

== Historical figures ==
- Archduchess Maria Anna of Austria
- Duke Maximilian I, Elector of Bavaria
- Cardinal-Infante Ferdinand
- Duke Ernest of Saxe-Gotha
- Duke Bernhard of Saxe-Weimar
- General Johan Banér

== Literary significance and reception ==
Publishers Weekly gave a positive review, finding it a "complicated but coherent story" and "refreshing to read an alternate history that doesn't depend upon the clash of anachronistic arms, but rather on how modern ideas of human rights, education, sanitation and law might have affected the Europe of the 30 Years War." A reviewer for the SFRevu wrote that this is not a "stand alone novel" and that reading other books in the series first would "make some of the inside jokes and intricate politics more clear." The Midwest Book Review said that the "story line is fast-paced, but contains a more serious tone than its predecessors."

1634: The Bavarian Crisis was the third book in the 1632 series to be listed on the New York Times Best Seller list for hardcover fiction. In October 2007, the book was on the NY Times list for one week while peaking at number 29.

The book was listed on the Locus Hardcovers Bestsellers List for one month in 2008, at number 8.
