= 1636: The Kremlin Games =

2012 alternative history novel

- Author: Gorg Huff and Paula Goodlett
- Cover artist: Tom Kidd
- Language: English
- Series: 1632 series
- Genre: Alternate history, science fiction
- Publisher: Baen Books
- Publication date: June 5, 2012
- Publication place: United States
- Media type: Print (hardback & paperback)
- Pages: 416 (hardback)
- ISBN: 978-1-4516-3776-2 (hardback)
- OCLC: 803755603
- Followed by: 1637: The Volga Rules

1636: The Kremlin Games is a novel in the 1632 series written by Gorg Huff and Paula Goodlett along with Eric Flint. It is the fourth book in the series to be listed on the New York Times bestseller list for hardcover fiction. It reached number 30 on the NY Times list during a single week in June 2012. It was also listed on the Locus Hardcovers Bestsellers List for the month of September, 2012, at number 6.

A sequel, 1637: The Volga Rules, was published in 2018.

== Plot ==
The story follows Bernie Zeppi, an auto mechanic from Grantville, as he travels East to Russia and helps to set in motion various chains of events that lead to the fundamental reordering of Russian history and a massive shift from a primarily agrarian economy to a more industrialized one.

== Reception ==
Bill Lawhorn, writing for SFRevu, gave 1636: The Kremlin Games a positive review, stating that it "is another side story in the ongoing Grantville saga", the "action is carried on by characters that haven't played a significant role in earlier parts of the series", and it "allowed fans to get involved in the development." Beth Revers, reviewing for San Francisco Book Review, wrote that the book "is a standout even in a wonderful series" and it has "war, political intrigue, romance, [and] even car chases." The Midwest Book Review said that the novel is "an enjoyable thriller with a wonderful second order effect on Bernie and the Russians."
