= 1636: The Devil's Opera =

2013 novel by David Carrico and Eric Flint

- Author: Eric Flint and David Carrico
- Cover artist: Tom Kidd
- Language: English
- Series: 1632 series
- Genre: Alternate history, science fiction
- Publisher: Baen Books
- Publication date: October 1, 2013
- Publication place: United States
- Media type: Print (hardback & paperback)
- Pages: 528 (hardback)
- ISBN: 978-1-4516-3928-5 (hardback)
- OCLC: 830352082

1636: The Devil's Opera is a stand-alone novel in the alternative history 1632 series with minor character overlaps. Published on October 1, 2013, the book was written by David Carrico and Eric Flint. It is a semi-detective novel set in a growing industrial city. It is a continuation of two series of stories that David Carrico had originally published in the electronic versions of the Grantville Gazette, which were serialized over several issues and later compiled into the compilation 1635: Music and Murder, one series involving criminal investigation and crime fighting, and the other involving music and social revolution.

== Plot ==
The novel starts with the discovery of a body floating in a river by a new character, but things are not as simple as they first appear to be since more unsolved crimes begin to occur. Later, detectives Byron Chieske and Gotthilf Hoch of the recently formed Magdeburg Police, formerly the city watch, are called in to investigate. These two characters were first introduced in the story "None So Blind", published in the tenth issue of the Grantville Gazette. Some of the criminals involved in this novel were also developed in these serials.

The other main storyline involves musician Marla Linder and her husband Franz Sylwester and how they used music to motivate the common people to resist the conservative forces that were trying to take over and return the world to medieval way of doing things after the emperor was incapacitated during battle. These two characters were first introduced in the story "The Sound of Music" that was published in the third issue of the Grantville Gazette.

== Literary significance and reception ==
The reviewer for Booklist wrote that the book is "Another engaging alternate history from a master of the genre." However, he does warn readers that "familiarity with previous stories is, if not essential, at least strongly recommended." The reviewer for SFRevu wrote "This is a later book in a well-established world and is not the best entry point." Mark Lardas of the Galveston Daily News called it "an old-style police-procedural mystery, set in 17th century Germany." Two separate reviews were published in the Midwest Book Review. One called the book "a powerful and fast-paced story" while the other called it "an engaging for the most part low key tale". The Fistful of Wits reviewer admired "the pacing and denouement" of the novel.

1636: The Devil's Opera barely missed being listed on the Locus Hardcovers Bestsellers List in 2014, but did well enough to be labeled as a runner-up.
