= Ring of Fire III =

2011 book by Eric Flint

- Cover of the first edition of Ring of Fire III
- Author: Eric Flint
- Language: English
- Series: 1632 series
- Genre: Alternate history, science fiction
- Publisher: Baen Books
- Publication date: July 2011
- Publication place: United States
- Pages: 502 p.
- ISBN: 978-1-4391-3448-1
- OCLC: 687678754
- Dewey Decimal: 813.0876608
- Preceded by: 1636: The Saxon Uprising

Ring of Fire III is an anthology created by editor-author-historian Eric Flint, first published in hardcover by Baen Books in July 2011. It is the third anthology in the 1632 series, after Ring of Fire II (2008).

The book includes 20 short stories and a preface by the editor.

== Contents ==
The preface by Flint explains the contents of this anthology and mentions future works.

1. "Dye Another Day" by Mercedes Lackey tells of a scam pulled on Wallenstein by the uptimers.
2. "Birds of a Feather" by Charles E. Gannon concerns Irish mercenaries who are facing a change in warfare tactics.
3. "Falser Messiah" by Tim Roesch is about a young Jew who disagrees with the uptime reports of his role in history.
4. "Royal Dutch Airlines" by Gorg Huff & Paula Goodlett regards the change of TransEuropean Airlines into a royal enterprise.
5. "Milton's Choice" by Mark Huston addresses the arrest of John Milton for his writings in the original timeline.
6. "To End the Evening" by Brad Sinor relates the rescue of a kidnapped Irish Catholic by D'Artagnan and Aramis.
7. "Cap and Gown" by Jack Carroll discloses the contributions of a dying man to mathematical studies at Cambridge.
8. "A Relation of the Late Siege" by Panteleimon Roberts reveals tactics and weapons at the Ottoman siege of Iravan.
9. "Frying Pan" by Anette Pederson depicts the trials of a young Norwegian man in Rostock on the Baltic coast.
10. "All God's Children in the Burning East" by Garrett W. Vance covers the troubles of Japanese emigres in the Siamese kingdom of Ayutthaya and their move to the Khmer kingdom.
11. "Do It Once and Do It Again" by Terry Howard explains the development of an oil well in Wietze and the subsequent difficulties of a French agent.
12. "Les Ailes du Papillon" by Walter H. Hunt discusses the Butterfly Effect and its influence on the life of a French governor.
13. "And the Devil Will Drag You Under" by Walt Boyes depicts the downfall of a mercenary and the influence of uptime thinking on his life.
14. "Salonica" by Kim Mackey recounts the conversion of a Jewish employee of the Ottoman sultan.
15. "The Sound of Sweet Strings: A Serenade in One Movement" by David Carrico introduces the banjo to European audiences.
16. "Stone Harvest" by Karen Bergstrahl is about the redevelopment of archaeology in the new timeline.
17. "An Eye Opener" by Kerryn Offord & Linda Davidson shows the benefits of early detection and treatment of eye disorders.
18. "Make Mine Macrame" by Virginia DeMarce involves the USE in diplomacy and romance within Tyrol and Saxe-Weimar.
19. "Upward Mobility" by Charles E. Gannon puts a young "hidden" Jew in the middle of an aircraft development.
20. "Four Days on the Danube" by Eric Flint is the novella. It describes the Bavarian attack on Ingolstadt. The USE troops have to withdraw from the city and march toward Regensburg. They are pursued by an infantry regiment and a cavalry troop.

== Literary significance and reception ==
The reviewer for SFRevu said that "this collection contains high quality and stories that are important to the development of the 1632 universe" and that "fans of the series should easily be able to find several to enjoy as there is a little bit of everything." However, the reviewer warns readers that "this is not the place to start reading the series." In contrast, the reviewer for That's interesting... wrote a mixed review even though he enjoyed the series overall. Although the reviewer had high praise for Flint and for upcoming authors Garrett W. Vance and Tim Roesch for developing characters that he would care about, the reviewer felt that the other writers were "less talented" for writing stories that were just "more of the same" and "didn't stand out".
