= Howard Myers =

Howard Myers may refer to:

- Howdy Myers (1910–1980), American football, basketball and lacrosse coach and college athletics administrator
- Howard B. Myers (1901–1955), American statistician and economist
- Howard L. Myers (1930–1971), American science fiction author
