= 1635: The Papal Stakes =

2012 novel by Eric Flint

- Author: Eric Flint and Charles E. Gannon
- Cover artist: Tom Kidd
- Language: English
- Series: 1632 series
- Genre: Alternate history, science fiction
- Publisher: Baen Books
- Publication date: October 2, 2012
- Publication place: United States
- Media type: Print (hardback & paperback)
- Pages: 672 (hardback)
- ISBN: 978-1-4516-3839-4 (hardback)
- OCLC: 779265821
- Preceded by: 1635: The Cannon Law

1635: The Papal Stakes is a novel in the 1632 series written by Charles Gannon and Eric Flint. It was published in 2012, and is the direct sequel to 1635: The Cannon Law, published in 2006. This book is the third in the South European fork to the main 1632 series storyline. The story follows the exploits of younger members of the Stone family in Italy and describes the impact of Grantville on the Roman Catholic church and on the patchwork of independent countries in the Italian Peninsula.

== Plot summary ==
The book commences a few weeks following the events of 1635: The Cannon Law. In Rome, Pope Urban VIII is a refugee fleeing the forces of Cardinal Gaspar Borja y Velasco, who has deposed Urban and attempted to declare himself Pope. The remnants of the staff of the United States of Europe embassy in Rome, Harry Lefferts and his Wrecking Crew, and a group of newfound Irish allies (not only a group of Wild Geese which includes John O'Neill, Earl of Tyrone and Owen Roe O'Neill; but also Father Luke Wadding and another Franciscan priest who have been rescued from house arrest in Rome's Irish College of St Isidore) are evading Borja, who is not reacting well to the fact that his move to make himself Pope has not been widely accepted by the Church outside Spain and her dependencies).

A group which includes the Pope and the two Franciscans ends up taking refuge in a villa in the Dolomites. The Pope directs Wadding and Cardinal Mazzare to conduct a debate (moderated by Father General Vitelleschi) as to the meaning of the Ring of Fire and the Vatican II documents for the future of the Church, which is interrupted when their refuge is inevitably located and attacked by a force of assassins hired by Borja.

Meanwhile, other USE forces led by Harry Lefferts and his Wrecking Crew, along with the O'Neills and other Wild Geese, are attempting to rescue Frank Stone and his pregnant downtimer wife Giovanna Marcoli, who are being held hostage by Borja. The first effort to rescue them goes disastrously wrong. When the hostages are moved (in the wake of the debacle), Lefferts and the rest must arrange another attempt with the aid of xueta Dom Estuban Miro, to rescue them from a remote fortress on Mallorca.

In both subplots, the bloodshed is grim, and a number of sympathetic characters die, are grievously injured and/or must themselves commit violence in defense of themselves and others. Lefferts, Urban VIII, Frank Stone and Larry Mazzare each finds himself changed by his experiences.

== Literary significance and reception ==
The reviewer for SFRevu writes that "Charles Gannon takes the helm in this installment" and that "Gannon hits all the right notes." The Midwest Book Review calls the book "a fabulous thriller as Eric Flint and Charles E. Gannon prove a deft pairing." The reviewer for the Mixed Book Bag agrees that Flint and Gannon make a good writing team and adds, "This is a story that flows smoothly and is focused on the problems the characters face" and "the action is great and keeps the story arc moving along".

1635: The Papal Stakes is the first book in the 1632 series to be listed on The Wall Street Journal's Best-Selling Books list for Hardcover Science Fiction, which gets its data from NPD BookScan (formerly Nielsen BookScan). The book stayed on this list for two weeks in October 2012, peaking at number 6.
