= 1636: The Saxon Uprising =

2011 novel by Eric Flint

- First edition cover
- Author: Eric Flint
- Cover artist: Tom Kidd
- Language: English
- Series: 1632 series
- Genre: Alternate history science fiction
- Publisher: Baen Books
- Publication date: March 29, 2011
- Publication place: United States
- Media type: Print (hardback)
- Pages: 432 (hardback)
- ISBN: 978-1-4391-3425-2
- OCLC: 646112888
- Dewey Decimal: 813.54
- Preceded by: 1635: The Eastern Front
- Followed by: Ring of Fire III; 1637: The Polish Maelstrom

1636: The Saxon Uprising is an alternate history novel by Eric Flint in the 1632 series, first published in hardcover by Baen Books on March 29, 2011, with a paperback edition following from the same publisher in March 2012. It is a direct continuation of 1635: The Eastern Front. The threads mentioned in this novel are taken up in 1637: The Polish Maelstrom.

== Plot summary ==
In the alternative history scenario of the novel and series, Emperor Gustav Adolphus, ruler of the new United States of Europe, has suffered a head trauma in battle, rendering him unable to rule. The Swedish chancellor Axel Oxenstierna seizes this opportunity to try to reestablish the power of the nobility in the USE. He keeps the USE army occupied fighting against Poland and reinforcing Bohemia, leaving Swedish and Provincial forces as the only professional soldiers in the country. He uses this advantage to co-opt the ruling Crown Loyalist Party and bully its leader, Prime Minister Wilhelm Wettin, into co-operating with him. Other conservative leaders remain wary, such as the landgravine of Hesse-Kassel, which has the strongest provincial force; she chooses to keep neutral in the conflict. When Bavaria invades the Upper Palatinate the only soldiers available to meet them are the Thuringia-Franconia National Guard and one battalion of USE forces. Wettin, discovering that Bavaria invaded on the covert invitation of the Chancellor to ensure the defense forces cannot oppose his coup, confronts Oxenstierna, only to be arrested and removed from office.

Meanwhile, Swedish general Johan Banér lays siege to Dresden, the capital of Saxony, which is under the control of Oxenstierna's opponents. Ernst Wettin is the official Imperial Administrator, but Gretchen Richter and the Committees of Correspondence hold the real power there. They enter into an informal alliance with Saxon rebel forces in Vogtland in order to protect as many people as possible from Banér's butchery.

Rebecca Stearns and the opposition Fourth of July Party coordinate with the CoC to act in a restrained manner and undermine the legitimacy of Axel Oxenstierna and the Crown Loyalists gathered in Berlin. Meanwhile, Princess Christina and Prince Ulric travel to the capital at Magdeburg, symbolically aligning themselves with Oxenstierna's opponents and further undermining the Swedish Chancellor.

Mike Stearns, leader of the USE army in Bohemia, takes this opportunity to lead his Third Division into Saxony to break the siege of Dresden. He meets General Banér in battle during a snow storm in which his troops are more prepared to battle. Banér is killed, the Swedish forces routed, and the siege broken. Gustav Adolphus regains his wits soon after that and puts an end to Oxenstierna's bid for power. Wilhelm Wettin is released from custody and reinstated as Prime Minister, but with his Crown Loyalists discredited agrees to call early elections. Gustav Adolphus meets with Mike Stearns to negotiate an orderly transition of power, and the emperor commissions Stearns to take on the invading Bavarians.

== Literary significance and reception ==
The reviewer for SFRevu gave a mostly positive review by saying "The main plot moves forward with a huge cast of characters and lots of bouncing around. There are numerous little interludes that tell the reaction to events from the point of view of multiple areas."

In contrast, the reviewer for the Shiny Book Review gave a more mixed review by writing "Confused yet? Yeah, I was too actually." and "The story was okay, though the author does have some memorable one-liners in it that made me laugh out loud and caused more than one person to look at me funny. The writing itself is good, as you would expect from Eric Flint, and the series continues to chug along."

The Fantasy Book Critic gave the most positive review by saying that the "book is also very entertainingly written with so many moments that make one laugh out loud, with action galore, but also with tragedy, suspense and the occasional heartbreak."

1636: The Saxon Uprising was listed on the Locus Hardcovers Bestsellers List for a single month in 2011 at number 4.
