= 1634: The Ram Rebellion =

2006 novel by Eric Flint

- Hardcover anthology cover art
- Authors: Eric Flint; Virginia DeMarce
- Cover artist: Tom Kidd
- Language: English
- Series: 1632 series, aka Ring of Fire series
- Genre: Alternate history
- Publisher: Baen Books
- Publication date: April 25, 2006 (hardback); November 27, 2007 (mass market paperback)
- Publication place: United States
- Media type: Print (hardback); Mass market paperback E-book
- Pages: 512 pages, 720 pages (paperback)
- ISBN: 1-4165-2060-0 (hc); ISBN 1-4165-7382-8 (pb); ISBN 978-1-4165-7382-1
- OCLC: 64097638
- Dewey Decimal: 813/.54 22
- LC Class: PS3556.L548 A6184 2006
- Preceded by: 1634: The Galileo Affair
- Followed by: 1635: The Cannon Law

1634: The Ram Rebellion is the seventh published work in the 1632 alternate history book series, and is the third work to establish a "main plot line or thread" of historical speculative focus that are loosely organized and classified geographically. The initial main thread is called the "Western and North-Central Europe thread" (encompassing northern and western Germany, Denmark, England, France, the Low Countries, Sweden and the Baltic); the second plot line, encompassing events in Italy, Spain, the Mediterranean region, and France, the "South European thread", and this book can be considered the starting novel of the "South-Central/South-East thread" being set in southern Germany, Austria, Bavaria, and Bohemia. This geographically organized plot thread actually began in Ring of Fire in Flint's novelette "The Wallenstein Gambit", which is set in Bohemia, Austria, and Germany, which tied into stories in various Grantville Gazettes.

== Contents ==
The book is hard to classify, as it is an oddity, as acknowledged by series creator Eric Flint in the foreword. It is an anthology, with several longer novelettes sandwiching seemingly unrelated short stories under an overarching storyline (hidden for a while) that is capped off by a short novel that finally brings all the seemingly unrelated and disparate contents together in the latter part of the book.

Unlike most works in the 1632 series, much of this book is written from the standpoint of common people "in the street", including Germans trying to cope with Grantville, West Virginia, "up-timers" trying to cope with their new world around Grantville, and both trying to deal with the problems of two widely different cultures meeting in the new United States of Europe. These merging dynamics are the milieu shaping stories Flint felt necessary to include even though they are set in 1631–1632. Their impact extends throughout the book and into 1634, as well as across political boundaries and battle lines as the historical imperatives developed in this book extend into the direct sequel 1634: The Bavarian Crisis.

== Plot summary ==
The book spot-covers local events and a few related diplomatic discussions from a few days after the Ring of Fire (May–June 1631) to October in the fall of 1634—giving it the largest time footprint of the four—though narrowly focused. The short novel that concludes the work begins in late August 1633 and overlaps many of the shorter works earlier in the book. Two of the three other books set in 1634 refer to the events in the work (usually as the "troubles in Franconia") setting its canonical place in the "greater" neo-historical international politics covered in the other two works.

=== "Recipes for Revolution" ===
The two Larkin "Birdie" Newhouse tales along with two flashback vignettes by Flint begin the Ram Rebellion book, all four set in the weeks immediately after the Ring of Fire. In the Flint stories which are sandwiched around the Birdie tales, Mike Stearns goes back to school under the tutelage of Melissa Mailey. Stearns has a problem, he has to get a handle on likely complications from the local population, as the stories are set just a few days after he is elected as Chairman of the Emergency Committee. As a result, Mailey gives Stearns several very thick history books on European history in the era.

Birdie Newhouse has an immediate problem, he's a farmer with most of his farm's arable land 300 years off and a continent away. The stories by Gorg Huff and Paula Goodlett explore the alien land practices and ownership of down-time Germany as Birdie seeks to gain additional lands. Land sales are rare; worse, the lawyers are in control and there are three general levels of vested interest: The owners-in-fact, a variable number of other claimants, and the tenants. The tenants have certain rights and obligations over and above monetary rent while leases are generally for the lesser of three generations or 99 years. In between the owner-in-fact and the tenants is usually a monetary transaction which gives the rents to any number of claimants—depending upon the finances of the landholding family. The claimants all have a say in the farm operation to some extent, as do the occupants of the farm villages, which also have the right to disapprove or accept new co-farmers, for the land is farmed cooperatively with another set of obligations and entitlements. Birdie can't just go and buy a piece of land, he has to buy it from three different and diverse groups of people... and get them all to agree to terms. As the story notes, seventeenth-century Germany was a lawyer's paradise.

=== "Enter the Ram" ===
Flo Richards is a farmer's wife with four grown children who had bought a small flock of type C Delaine Merino sheep and some angora rabbits before the Ring of Fire in the hope that she'd see more of her youngest daughter, Jen, once she'd finished her studies out of town. The Ring of Fire had consequently left Jan behind in the present in which Flo dealt with this loss by concentrating on her livestock. She and her husband JD have local Germans living with them as partners now that farming has become more labour-intensive. Flo's laments about the poor quality wool from the locally obtained ram (who comes to be known as Brillo for that reason) strike a chord with someone and subsequently a number of 'Brillo fables' start to appear in the local broadsheet; the fables concern the titular ram escaping from his pen and interfering with her merino breeding program. The ram's fame spreads through Grantville out into the rest of Germany. The Women's League of Voters uses a Ram's Head as its emblem, schoolchildren sing songs about Brillo, and even adapt it into a ballet.

=== "The Trouble in Franconia" ===
With the example of future Grantville, a peasant revolt becomes a revolutionary movement in the fractured Holy Roman Empire south and east of Thuringia while the Machiavellian maneuvers in the neo-historical governments and various field armies now dance to counter-act those aimed at the Americans' new heartland. Up-timers, from the original USA space-time want the serfs to succeed and liberate themselves—but also know what a bloodbath the French Revolution became and various individuals act to help one and prevent the others. Avoiding that path will take all sorts of resources and efforts, and Americans from both uptime and down-time act resolutely to mitigate the problems, diplomacy to head off wars headed by authoritarians threatened by the new American ideals, and a deft appreciation of when not to fight and dangle an irresistible carrot instead.

=== "The Ram Rebellion" ===
In Franconia, schoolteacher Constantin Ableidinger has been reading Common Sense by Thomas Paine. He also finds the Brillo stories interesting. The farmers in Franconia (and Thuringia for that matter) have a history of dissent concerning serfdom and Mike Stearns has hopes of getting some fundamental changes made in the way that Franconia is run as a result of a farmer's rebellion of sorts. He neglects to include this in the briefing given to the civil servants sent down to administer Franconia although these people, Johnny F. and Noelle Murphy, among others have an effect on the schoolteacher's "Ram rebellion".

== Literary significance and reception ==
Dana Blankenhorn of ZDNet called the book "a sort of open source novel" as a way of describing how Eric Flint invited other authors to contribute stories to this book in which it extends the franchise. Another reviewer wrote that "the book gets mired down in detail. It was just too much information."

1634: The Ram Rebellion was listed on the Locus Hardcovers Bestsellers List for two months in a row during 2006, peaking at number 2.
