= 1635: The Dreeson Incident =

2008 novel by Eric Flint

- Author: Virginia DeMarce and Eric Flint (series creator and editor)
- Cover artist: Tom Kidd
- Language: English
- Series: 1632 series
- Genre: Alternate history, science fiction
- Publisher: Baen Books
- Publication date: December 16, 2008
- Publication place: United States
- Media type: Print (hardback)
- ISBN: 1-4165-5589-7
- OCLC: 209699884
- Dewey Decimal: 813/.54 22
- LC Class: PS3556.L548 A61865 2008
- Preceded by: 1634: The Bavarian Crisis; The Anaconda Project; Ring of Fire II
- Followed by: 1635: The Tangled Web

1635: The Dreeson Incident, published in 2008, is a novel in the alternate history 1632 series, written by Virginia DeMarce and Eric Flint, as a sequel to Flint's novella 1634: The Bavarian Crisis.

== Plot summary ==
The novel takes place after the events of 1634: The Galileo Affair, and 1635: The Cannon Law in which French Huguenot extremist Michel Ducos came close to assassinating Pope Urban VIII and was forced to flee with his followers from Rome. The leaders of the French Huguenot group under Ducos settled in Scotland making plans to embarrass Cardinal Richelieu. Michel also has left strict instructions for several of his followers, led by Guillaume Locquifier, in Frankfurt to do nothing until he gives them new orders.

Meanwhile, Duke Henri de Rohan, the highest ranking Huguenot, has his own group of agents monitoring events throughout Europe. He also would like to see Richelieu removed from office, but he views the radical actions of Ducos as self-defeating. After having learning the events in Rome, Henri writes letters to his agents in Grantville, Frankfurt and elsewhere warning of the escape of Ducos and ordering them to notify him if Ducos appears. Rohan has two double agents working within the Ducos operation. Jacques-Pierre Dumais is one of the double agents working for the Duke, who works in Grantville as a garbage collector while secretly examining 20th century knowledge discarded by the American residents. Spymaster Francisco Nasi has also been trying to track down Ducos. His agents and others have been sending reports on activities in Grantville and elsewhere within the State of Thuringia-Franconia.

In the midst of this, the United States of Europe elections are taking place. Incumbent Prime Minister Mike Stearns is sure that his political party will lose, but figures that his opponent William Wettin will overextend himself and his respective Crown Loyalists party. Ducos' Huguenots in Frankfurt plan a demonstration and action in Grantville to vilify Richelieu by plotting assassinations on Grantville's powerful figures: Mayor Henry Dreeson and Presbyterian minister Enoch Wiley (as attempts on individuals such as Mike Stearns and Gustavus Adolphus remain impossible to do). The assassinations are successfully carried out during several manipulated demonstrations against vaccination and autopsies through down-timers and an anti-Semitic incident at Grantville's synagogue as covers for the assassination. In the aftermath, the results do not come out as the Huguenots had planned: Nasi, Stearns, and several others figure out the cause for the assassinations. They and other like-minded individuals are shocked by the provocative actions of the anti-Semites and decide to use the incident to justify the total eradication of all antisemitic forces in the area controlled by Grantville's allies.

== Reception ==
The book received mixed to negative reviews from readers.

A reviewer for SFRevu liked the book, but wrote that "it is easy to get drawn in by these characters, although sometimes it is hard to keep track of all the subplots that have developed". Library Journal gave a more positive review by saying that the authors "keeps the action moving and the history honest as ordinary citizens of the 20th century bring their skills and their hopes to a dark time in European history." The reviewer for Booklist wrote that this book is a "solid addition to the Ring of Fire alternate history saga."

1635: The Dreeson Incident was listed on the Locus Hardcovers Bestsellers List for a single month in 2009, at number 5.
