= 1635: The Eastern Front =

2010 novel by Eric Flint

- First edition cover
- Author: Eric Flint
- Cover artist: Tom Kidd
- Language: English
- Series: 1632 series
- Genre: Alternate history, science fiction
- Publisher: Baen Books
- Publication date: October 5, 2010
- Publication place: United States
- Media type: Print (hardback)
- Pages: 369 p.
- ISBN: 978-1-4391-3389-7
- OCLC: 555638250
- Dewey Decimal: 813.6
- LC Class: PS3556.L548 A61866 2010
- Preceded by: 1635: The Tangled Web
- Followed by: 1636: The Saxon Uprising

1635: The Eastern Front is an alternate history novel by Eric Flint in the 1632 series, first published in hardcover by Baen Books on October 5, 2010, with a paperback edition following from the same publisher in November 2011. It is a sequel to 1635: The Tangled Web and is directly continued by 1636: The Saxon Uprising.

== Plot summary ==
In the alternative history scenario of the novel and series, Swedish king Gustavus Adolphus has, with the aid of the time-displaced citizens of Grantville, West Virginia, tipped the balance in the Thirty Years' War and become emperor of much of Germany, now reorganized as the United States of Europe. Having at least temporarily sidelined Austria and France, the main enemies of the new state, he is free to turn his attention to the rebellious states of Brandenburg and Saxony and pursue his dream of conquering Poland. The former are duly reconquered and the latter invaded.

West Virginian Mike Stearns, former prime minister of the USE and now a major general in command of the army's third division of the USE army, acquits himself well in the campaign, but atrocities committed by some of his men lead him to establish the Hangman Regiment to police his own forces, under the command of new-minted Light Colonel Jeff Higgins.

Meanwhile, on the home front, other sequences of events involve Mike's wife Rebecca Abrabanel and the Swedish royal family. French Huguenots attempt to assassinate Gustavus's daughter Princess Kristina and her betrothed Prince Ulrik in an attempt to provoke the wrath of the Swedes and Danes against Cardinal Richelieu and the government of their Catholic-ruled country. The prince and princess escape, though her mother, the queen Maria Eleonora, is murdered.

Gustavus's eastern war is stalled in the battle of Lake Bledno, in which he gains a strategic victory but receives a life-threatening wound. His hitherto-loyal chancellor Axel Oxenstierna takes the opportunity to seize power in an attempt to reverse the democratizing influence of the West Virginians, endangering the USE at a critical juncture.

== Literary significance and reception ==
The reviewer for SFRevu gave a positive review and wrote "One of the best things about Flint’s writing is the smooth flow of his battle descriptions. He presents the majesty and the horror without getting bogged down in a blow by blow recounting of the action. He seamlessly meshes the multitude of points of view into a coherent tale that spans the limits of the USE. It is enjoyable to read the way he brings action in the side books into the main plot. That has always been one of the hallmarks of the series." The reviewer for a Shiny Book Review wrote that the "story takes awhile to get going" while also praised the author by writing that "with typical deftness, Eric Flint can usually create a great story" and "this is an Eric Flint novel, so you know the editing is going to be sound."

1635: The Eastern Front barely missed being listed on the Locus Hardcovers Bestsellers List in 2011, but did well enough to be labeled as a runner-up.
