= Grantville Gazette II =

2006 anthology of fan fiction stories

- Grantville Gazette II cover as a serialized eMagazine
- Author: Eric Flint, et al.
- Cover artist: Thomas Kidd
- Language: English
- Series: 1632 series
- Genre: Science fiction
- Published: March 7, 2006 Baen Books
- Publication place: United States
- Media type: E-book & Print (Hardback)
- Pages: 336 pages
- ISBN: 978-1-4165-2051-1
- Preceded by: The Grantville Gazette
- Followed by: Grantville Gazette III

Grantville Gazette II is the third collaborative anthology published in print set in the 1632-verse shared universe in what is best regarded as a canonical sub-series of the popular alternate history that began with the February 2000 publication of the hardcover novel 1632 by author-historian Eric Flint. Baen Books and Flint decline the distinction, counting this book as the sixth published work. Overall it is also the third anthology in printed publication in the atypical series, which consists of a mish-mash of main novels and anthologies produced under popular demand after publication of the initial novel, which was written as a stand-alone work.

== Plot synopses ==
=== "Steps in the Dance" ===
by Eric Flint

Anne Jefferson and Harry Lefferts pose for Rembrandt as part of a complex political situation.

=== "Collateral Damage" ===
by Mike Spehar

Hans Richter's flying instructor is still heartsore over his loss. He volunteers to fly a special mission to Paris targeting the unsuspecting Cardinal Richelieu.

=== "Euterpe, Episode 1" ===
by Enrico M. Toro

Composer Giacomo Carissimi is directed by Cardinal Mazarini (Mazarin) to visit Grantville, and finally obtains adequate funds.

=== "The Company Men" ===
by Christopher James Weber

The ambassador from the powerful Mughal Empire of northern India is held captive in Austria, but Grantville does not have enough troops to rescue him. Instead, Mike Stearns hires a mercenary troop run by an Englishman and an Irishman.

=== "Just One of Those Days" ===
by Leonard Hollar

A string of mishaps keeps a Finnish cavalryman from action against the Croats attacking Grantville's high school, while an uptime German is uniquely positioned to pick off attackers.

=== "God's Gifts" ===
by Gorg Huff

Down-time German Lutheran pastor Steffan Schultheiss in Badenburg is wary of the citizens of Grantville shortly after its appearance due to their modern views on religion; in which he warns his flock against Grantville in order to keep their modern progressing influence from corrupting his congregation. However, Schultheiss's religious warnings were not heeded due to politics and economics, which both made Grantville attractive to Badenburg. Schultheiss continued to condemn Grantville's practices until his outcries infuriated his wife, who has a positive view on Grantville. Eventually, with guidance from his wife, Schultheiss changed his stance on Grantville and becomes more tolerant of the Americans' ideals, including freedom of religion.

=== "Bottom-Feeders" ===
by John Zeek

The story is a police procedural that follows two policemen Jurgen Neubert, a down-time farmer and former mercenary soldier turned cop, and Marvin Tipton, a long service cop, through a murder case.

=== "An Invisible War" ===
by Danita Ewing

"An Invisible War" is a short novel that was the first serialized piece of longer fiction that spanned this and the next Gazette in their e-published versions—though the whole (110 pages) was published in the hardcover release of Grantville Gazette II. The tale set mostly in 1633 after Grantville has had time to settle-in and look beyond immediate survival issues. It deals with public health and integration and dissemination of medical knowledge efforts during the end of the Confederated Principalities of Europe and early United States of Europe period, for the various Mike Stearns-led administration's have been repeatedly reminded by Dr. James Nichols and Melissa Mailey how vulnerable populations are and were to diseases in the seventeenth century era—so the up-timers have been both strategically aware and taking steps from the outset within their capabilities and resources to mitigate any preventable health problems beginning in the novel 1632. To add impetus and urgency, as time goes by in the experience of Grantville, some of the historical research conducted in the two libraries reveals that plague outbreaks occurred locally in OTL in diverse regions during 1632, 1634, and 1635 saw a large epidemic-size outbreak. Worse, the historical record might also indicate other outbreaks, which were poorly documented.

The story is one of Grantville's medical personnel meeting head-on with down-timer University practices, prejudices and a college curricula based in large part on the Classics and Theological studies. The town establishes the Lahey Clinic hospital near the Grantville High School and establishes a local nurse training program in 1631–1632, and by the summer of 1633 has reached out to the faculty of the University of Jena, but the only spareable medical manpower to head up a college of medicine are... women!

== Fact essays ==
=== "A Quick and Dirty Treatise on Historical Fencing" ===
by Enrico M. Toro

=== "So You Want to Do Telecommunications in 1633?" ===
by Rick Boatright

=== "Mente et Malleo: Practical Mineralogy and Minerals Exploration in 1632" ===
by Laura Runkle

=== "The Secret Book of Zink" ===
by Andrew Clark

== Literary significance and reception ==
A reviewer for Rosboch Book Reviews called the book "a mixed bag" with "some of the stories are cute, some are more serious." Another reviewer at Goodreads called the book "A fun and quick read although the non-fiction articles can get pretty dry."

The Grantville Gazette II was listed on the Locus Hardcovers Bestsellers List for a single month in 2006 at number 10.

== Publishing history ==
Printed in the United States

- Eric Flint, ed. (October 2003). Grantville Gazette II (e-book) (E-book ed.). Baen Books.
- Eric Flint, ed. (March 2006). Grantville Gazette II (hardcover (Simon & Schuster) ed.). Baen Books. ISBN 978-1-4165-2051-1.
- Eric Flint, ed. (October 2007). Grantville Gazette II (1st ed. paperback, mass market ed.). Baen Books. ISBN 978-1-4165-5510-0.

== See also ==
- Development history of the 1632 series
- The Grantville Gazettes—This article covers various common matters on the sub-series in depth, in particular the Phase II experiments with an eMagazine and Phase III (ongoing) maturation of the milieu using collaborative fiction. All the Gazettes are edited by Eric Flint.
