= 1635: The Tangled Web =

2009 novel by Virginia DeMarce

- Author: Virginia DeMarce
- Cover artist: Tom Kidd
- Language: English
- Series: 1632 series
- Genre: Alternate history, science fiction
- Publisher: Baen Books
- Publication date: December 1, 2009
- Publication place: United States
- Media type: Print (hardback & paperback)
- Pages: 368 (paperback)
- ISBN: 978-1-4391-3308-8 (paperback)
- OCLC: 434563397
- Dewey Decimal: 813.6
- Preceded by: 1635: The Dreeson Incident
- Followed by: 1635: The Eastern Front

1635: The Tangled Web is a novel in the alternate history 1632 series, written by Virginia DeMarce.

Two of the stories were previously published in the online version of The Grantville Gazettes, with "Prince and Abbot" first published in Volume 8 and "Mail Stop" first published in Volume 9. The rest of the stories are original material.

== Plot summary ==
The main setting takes place in Fulda in 1633, and follows four interlinking stories which tie together near the end of the novel.

=== "Prince and Abbot" ===
The New United States has decided to accept the return of Johann Bernhard Schenk von Schweinsberg as the Abbot of Fulda, but the Abbot will have to give up the title of prince. Moreover, he will not be allowed to collect tithes. The N.U.S. is now the secular authority in Fulda and will collect the taxes. The Abbot surprises Wes Jenkins, the administrator of Fulda, in his attempts to persuade the monks to abide by the new rules of his order. The local monks have resisted these rules. Even the importation of Saint Gall monks has not won them over to the Tridentine doctrines. Dissatisfied Catholic conspirators in Bonn decide to unsettle affairs in Fulda. They initially arrange to post scurrilous flyers all over the town and then hire Irish mercenaries led by Walter Leslie to abduct the Abbot and several N.U.S. administrators.

=== "Mail Stop" ===
The story focuses on Martin Wackernagel. As a private courier, he delivers correspondence and small packages on a route stretching from Grantville to Gelnhausen along the imperial road. He also makes side trips to Barracktown and other locations near his route. Martin visits his mother now and then during his travels, but he is reluctant to face her. She keeps asking when he will be married, but things are not as they seems. There is a secondary thread involving a pair of fourteen-year-olds operating a downtime mimeograph machine and unwittingly producing propaganda material that could lead to local unrest that is always in the background of the first three stories.

A third thread involves a young teenaged Jewish boy named David who wanted to leave his village and see the world as a postal carrier instead of being tied to his village in an unwanted profession and an arranged marriage to a vapid young girl. All of the different thread diverge and intersects along Wackernagel's postal route.

=== "Happy Wanderer" ===
"Happy Wanderer" is also about Martin Wackernagel, a private courier with a regular route. He maintains three separate households complete with wife and children unknown to his mother or his other "wives". The woman he hopes to make his fourth wife is niece to Clara Bachmeierin, who married Wes Jenkins in the first story.

=== "Window of Opportunity" ===
The story examines the actions of the Mainz Committee of Correspondence. Bernard Eberhard, Captain Duke of the Swedish Army, is sent to Fulda by General Brahe to observe the interplay between NUS administrators and Abbot von Schweinsberg. Bernhard takes his brothers and his fellow CoC members with him to Fulda. He and his brothers began working for Major Derek Utt. Later, Utt plans an operation against the Irish soldiers who had abducted the Abbot. He sends Sergeant Helmut Herke and a small band of soldiers to determine the whereabouts of the colonels.

== Literary significance and reception ==
One reviewer thought that the first half of the book was a "little boring" since it describes events that were mentioned in previous books but from a different POV. For the second half of the book, the reviewer said that this "section of the book starts out light and turns dark but is all fresh material."

1635: The Tangled Web was listed on the Locus Hardcovers Bestsellers List for one month in 2010 at number 5.
