= Virginia DeMarce =

American historian and science fiction author (born 1940)

- Born: November 28, 1940 (age 85)
- Education: Stanford University (PhD)
- Occupations: Novelist; short story writer; historian
- Writing career
- Years active: 2003–present (fiction); 1967-1996 (non-fiction)
- Genre: Alternate history
- Notable work: 1634: The Bavarian Crisis

Virginia Easley DeMarce (born November 28, 1940) is an American historian who specializes in early modern European history, as well as a New York Times Best Selling author in the 1632 series collaborative fiction project. She has done genealogical work on the origins of the Melungeon peoples.

== Biography ==
DeMarce received her Ph.D. in early modern European history from Stanford University in 1967, with a dissertation in German administrative history during the time of the 1525 German Peasants' War. She taught at the college level for fifteen years, at Northwest Missouri State University and George Mason University and published a book on German military settlers in Canada after the American Revolution.

In 1988-89 she served as president of the National Genealogical Society, an interest she came to professionally in social history and demographic history tracing small group migrations. After several years on the staff of the National Conference of State Historic Preservation Officers, she took a position with the Office of Federal Acknowledgment, Bureau of Indian Affairs, U.S. Department of the Interior, from which she retired in 2004.

DeMarce continues to live in Arlington, Virginia, with her husband of 43 years (deceased in 2010), who was Director of Coal Mine Workers Compensation Programs at the U.S. Department of Labor. She spends most of her time tending to her crops that have been scorched by the droughts in recent summer seasons. They have three grown children and five grandchildren.

== Published works ==
In addition to scholarly work on Early Modern Europe, genealogy, The Melungeons, and bibliographic work in early US history, DeMarce has written or co-authored a number of formative short stories and novels in the 1632 series collaborative fiction project. She is one of the principal controlling parties of the collaboration, and a member of the 1632 editorial board. In these positions, she helps select likely stories for the project and manages the 1632 canon, common shared resources, and integration between authors.

She began writing fiction upon the request of participants in the 1632 Tech forum at Baen's Bar, where she had contributed technical input and assistance. Her first fiction contribution to the project was the short story "Biting Time", which she wrote with great reluctance under much pressure.

As of 2014, all four of her long fiction were listed on various best selling book lists. In particular, 1634: The Bavarian Crisis was listed on the New York Times Best Seller list for hardcover fiction for one week in October 2007. All four were Locus Hardcovers Bestsellers.

=== Short fiction ===
- "Biting Time" in Ring of Fire — a short story featuring Veronica Richter, grandmother of Gretchen and Hans Richter, two important characters in 1632. It details both her courtship of Grantville's mayor as well as the founding of the first of her "Academies", reactions against the lack of corporal punishment in up-timer discipline.
- The Rudolstadt Colloquy in Grantville Gazette I — a short story dealing with a religious crisis among Lutherans caused by news of Grantville and the information in its history books. The events of the story are mentioned in several of the novels, establishing it as deep background for the works as a whole.
- Pastor Kastenmayer’s Revenge in Grantville Gazette III— The good pastor escapes from a small village leading women and children whilst most of the village's men and boys perish fighting a delaying action against Count Tilly's rampaging mercenaries. In Grantville, his oldest daughter gets swept off her feet by a handsome up-timer and marries a few days later without permission.
  With the help of a formidable widow, the pastor plots a fitting revenge and founds a fifth-column that seeks to not only trap eligible bachelors into marriage to his doweryless flocks daughters, but to convert the scoundrels into becoming stalwart Lutherans. The tale is loosely modeled on the Seven Daughters for Seven Sons, at least in numbers, and every couple has their story that spans the time line from 1631 to early 1635.
- Til We Meet Again in Grantville Gazette IV — a widowed up-timer responds to her husband's death by joining the faculty in the newly established women's college in Quedlinburg.
- Murphy's Law in Grantville Gazette V
- A Gift from the Duchess and Second Thoughts in Ring of Fire II
- Arrested Development as (Gazette Singles Book 1) ASIN B00EHN30YE
- "On the Jerichow Road" with S. M. Stirling (September 2023; in 1632 & Beyond, Issue #1, ISBN 978-1962398008)

=== Long fiction ===
- 1634: The Ram Rebellion with Eric Flint and Paula Goodlett — a collection of short fiction with an overarching theme and direction, culminating with two long contributions written by DeMarce and Flint. It focuses on the conquered territories in Franconia under the administration of the New United States led by Grantville, West Virginia, ISBN 1-4165-2060-0.
- 1634: The Bavarian Crisis with Eric Flint — a traditional novel and sequel to Flint's novella The Wallenstein Gambit in the Ring of Fire anthology as well as 1634: The Galileo Affair and 1634: The Baltic War. Although the first draft of The Bavarian Crisis was completed in 2005, its release was delayed until after The Baltic War was published in 2007, ISBN 978-1-4165-4253-7.
- 1635: The Dreeson Incident with Eric Flint — the sequel to 1634: The Bavarian Crisis, published in December 2008, ISBN 1-4165-5589-7.
- 1635: The Tangled Web - standalone novel, published in December 2009, ISBN 978-1-4391-3308-8.
- The Legions of Pestilence (April 2019), ISBN 978-1948818353 (Republished by Baen ISBN 978-1-62579-976-0)
- The Trouble With Huguenots (December 2019), ISBN 978-1948818636 (Republished by Baen ISBN 978-1-62579-977-7)
- Things Could Be Worse: The Pastor Kastenmayer Stories (October 2020), ISBN 978-1953034205 (Republished by Baen ISBN 978-1-62579-978-4)
- Designed To Fail (December 2020), ISBN 978-1953034403 (Republished by Baen ISBN 978-1-62579-979-1)
- The Unexpected Sales Reps (February 2022), ISBN 978-1956015485 (Republished by Baen ISBN 978-1-62579-980-7)

=== Genealogical and historical research ===
- DeMarce, Virginia E. (March 1992). "Verry Slitly Mixt': Tri-Racial Isolate Families of the Upper South - A Genealogical Study". National Genealogical Society Quarterly. 80: 5–35.
- DeMarce, Virginia E. (March 1993). "Looking at Legends - Lumbee and Melungeon: Applied Genealogy and the Origins of Tri-Racial Isolate Settlements". National Genealogical Society Quarterly. 81: 24–45.
- DeMarce, Virginia E. (June 1996). "Review of The Melungeons: Resurrection of a Proud People". National Genealogical Society Quarterly. 84: 134–149.
- Demarce, Virginia Easley (1984). The Settlement of Former German Auxiliary Troops in Canada After the American Revolution. Lost in Canada. ISBN 978-0-916849-02-3. OCLC 644057168.
