= Howard L. Myers =

American novelist

Howard L. Myers (1930–1971) was an American science fiction author, best known for his work published in Analog (frequently under the name Verge Foray) and the novel Cloud Chamber.

== Reception ==
John Clute in The Encyclopedia of Science Fiction described Cloud Chamber as "attractively combin[ing] [c]osmology, [a]ntimatter invaders of our Universe, [s]ex and effortless rebirth of all sentient beings." Paul Di Filippo wrote about Myers in his "Curiosities" column in The Magazine of Fantasy & Science Fiction. He described Myers as "a promising writer cut off too soon", collectively concluding that Myers' stories are "all marvellous" while Cloud Chamber received comparison with A. E. van Vogt, Charles L. Harness and Robert Sheckley."

== Bibliography ==
- Cloud Chamber (1977)
- The Creatures of Man (2003): a reprint collection, concluding with the eight "Econo-war" stories. Includes "Partner" (a renamed variant of "Duplex"), "The Creatures of Man", "All Around the Universe", "Health Hazard", "Practice!", "Lost Calling", "The Other Way Around", "The Reluctant Weapon", "Out, Wit!", "Fit For a Dog", "Psychivore", "Prologue: The Earth of Nenkunal", "Forever Enemy", "Heavy Thinker", "War in Our Time", "Misinformation", "Little Game", "The Frontliners" and "Questor".
- A Sense of Infinity (2009): a reprint collection of the remainder of his stories, divided into the three "Olivine, Renegade" stories, Cloud Chamber with several related works and a pair of linked novellas. Includes: "His Master's Vice", "The Pyrophylic Saurian", "Polywater Doodle", Cloud Chamber, "Ten Percent of Glory", "Bowerbird", "Man Off a White Horse", "Soul Affrighted", "The Infinity Sense" and "The Mind-Changer".
