= 1635: The Cannon Law =

2006 novel by Eric Flint and Andrew Dennis

- Author: Eric Flint and Andrew Dennis
- Cover artist: Tom Kidd
- Language: English
- Series: 1632 series
- Genre: Alternate history
- Publisher: Baen Books
- Publication date: September 26, 2006
- Publication place: United States
- Media type: Print (hardcover, e-book)
- Pages: 432 (hardcover)
- ISBN: 1-4165-0938-0
- Preceded by: 1634: The Galileo Affair
- Followed by: 1635: The Papal Stakes

1635: The Cannon Law is the sixth book and fifth novel published in the 1632 series by Eric Flint and Andrew Dennis. It is the second novel in the French-Italian plot thread, which began with 1634: The Galileo Affair and was published by Baen Books in 2006. The book explores the reactions of the Roman Catholic hardliners to Pope Urban VIII's actions in tolerating the new freedom of religion taking root in Central Europe during the climax of The Galileo Affair.

Like all the preceding books in the series, it is set in the Thirty Years' War. The series deals with history and political life, American culture and a host of other things taken for granted in today's First World countries.

== Plot summary ==
Following the events of 1634: The Galileo Affair, Pope Urban VIII has been won over to the actions of the Americans after being saved from his attempted assassination and his subsequent pardon of Galileo Galilei. However, Pope Urban's relations with the Americans and their allies earns the scorn of his historical enemy Cardinal Gaspar Borja y Velasco, who had been loudly critical of the actions, or inactions, of the Holy See in regard to Gustavus Adolphus, Galileo, and now Cardinal Larry Mazzare, and had been briefly banned from Rome by Urban.

Cardinal Borja returns to Rome, though living in the outskirts of the city, and having cultivated allies with the Spanish element of the Vatican and acquiring the aid of Francisco de Quevedo y Villega, a mercenary agent provocateur, is ordered by King Philip IV of Spain to stir up trouble within Rome with the efforts of discrediting Urban and turning him into a lame duck pope after Urban failed to support Spain in her war against the United States of Europe (USE). Borja exceeds these orders, orchestrating a military coup to overthrow Urban, which also caused the deaths of Urban's political allies including his cardinal-nephew Antonio Barberini, and replace him with a Spanish puppet. Urban escapes from his second attempted death with the help from the American Roman embassy, leading to Borja being declared an Anti-Pope, with only Spain and its satellites recognizing his authority as the new Pope.

== Literary significance and reception ==
Publishers Weekly was somewhat critical in their review, saying, "If this novel is not as rollicking as its predecessor, that may be because there really isn't anything funny about the Spanish Inquisition, Monty Python notwithstanding." Roland Green, reviewing for Booklist, was more positive, saying, "this is probably the strongest book in the magnificent saga since the opening volume 1632." The reviewer for SFRevu wrote that "the book has that iceburg [sic] feeling of inevitability" and that the "people of 1635 may be trying to get out of the path history set for them, but they're still driven by the same events and pressures that decided their fates the first time."

1635: The Cannon Law was listed on the Locus Hardcovers Bestsellers List for two months in a row at the end of 2006 and the beginning of 2007, peaking at number 8.
