= 1632 series =

Novel series

- 1632, the first novel in the series
- (see template at the bottom of page)
- Author: Eric Flint and others
- Country: United States
- Language: English
- Genre: Alternate history
- Publisher: Baen Books; Eric Flint's Ring of Fire Press
- Published: February 2000 – ongoing
- Media type: Print (hardcover and paperback), audiobook, e-book
- No. of books: 100+

The 1632 series, also known as the 1632-verse or Ring of Fire series, is an alternate history book series and sub-series created, primarily co-written, and coordinated by American author Eric Flint and published by Baen Books. Following Eric Flint's death in 2022, Charles E. Gannon was named the series' "showrunner" by Baen in October 2025.

The series is set in 17th-century Europe, in which the small fictional town of Grantville, West Virginia, was sent to the past from the year 2000 to the Thuringian Forest in central Germany in the year 1631, during the Thirty Years' War. By 2019, the series had seven published novels propelling the main plot and over ten published novels moving several subplots and threads forward. The series also includes fan-written, but professionally edited, collaborative material which were published in a bi-monthly magazine titled The Grantville Gazettes and some collaborative short fiction.

In terms of time travel literature, the 1632 series can be considered similar to (or inspired by) Mark Twain's A Connecticut Yankee in King Arthur's Court, in which a 19th-century American engineer, finding himself in 5th-century England, is able, all by himself, to introduce into the past society the full range of his time's technologies. In Flint's version, a whole modern community is transplanted into the past, in possession of a considerable amount of the material and written resources of modern society.

Since both the Grantville Gazette and the Ring of Fire Press had ceased operations shortly after Flint's death in 2022, the series was originally expected to be concluded after manuscripts that had already been submitted to Baen prior to Flint's death were published in the upcoming year or so. In June 2023, it was announced that a new company, Flint's Shards Inc., had signed a contract with Lucille Robbins, Flint's widow and heir, to produce a new electronic magazine called Eric Flint's 1632 & Beyond that was scheduled to be released bimonthly on the first day of odd-numbered months, with Bjorn Hasseler as editor-in-chief, starting in September 2023.

== Series overview ==
Map of the Holy Roman Empire divisions (c. 1618)

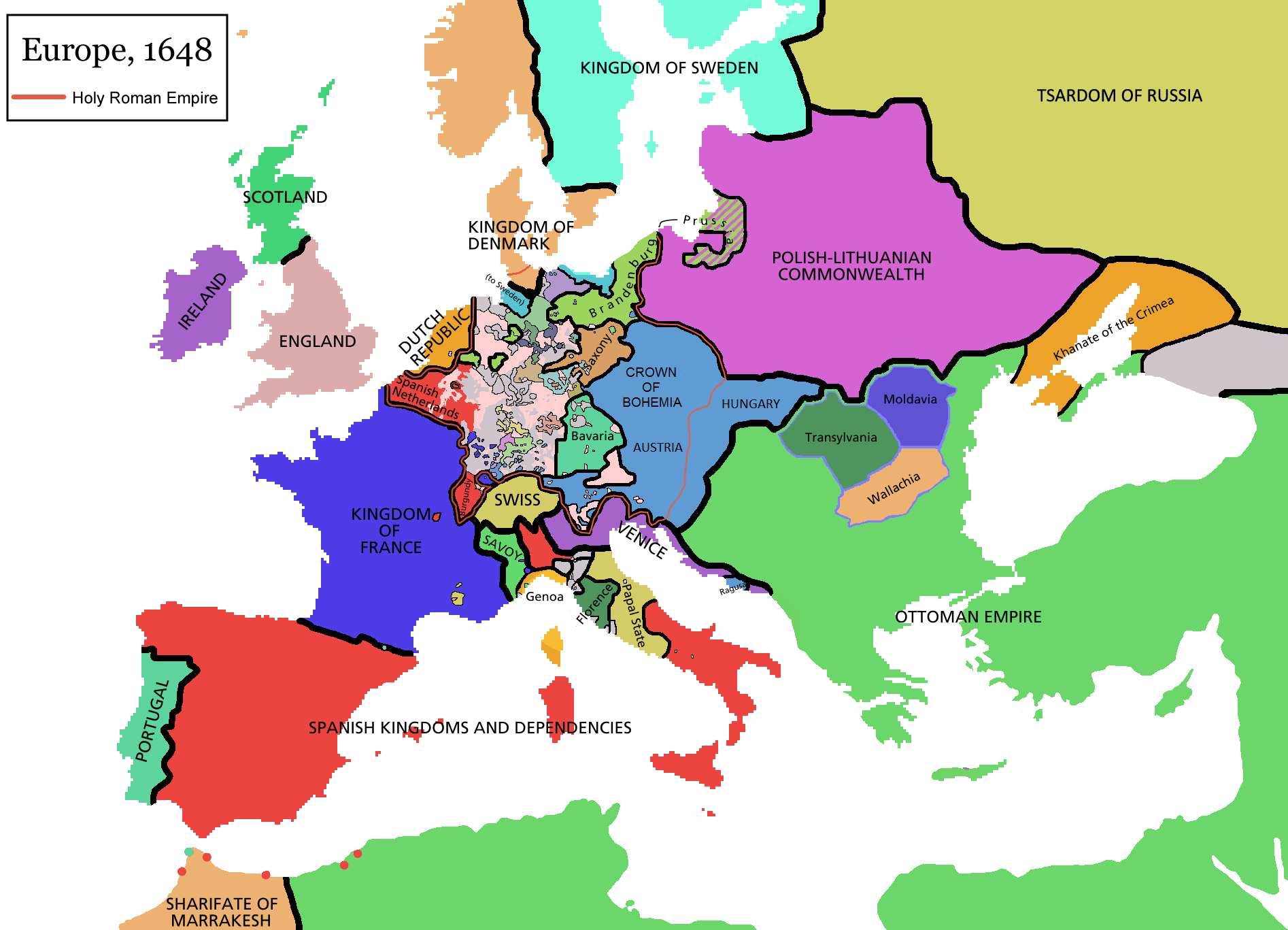
Europe in 1648

Map of today's Germany. Dark green shows Thuringia (compare with Holy Roman Empire map above).

The 1632 series began with Flint's stand-alone novel 1632 (released February 2000). The series, excepting the lead novel and the serialized e-novel The Anaconda Project (2007), is virtually all collaboratively written, including some "main works" with multiple co-authors. However, Flint has mentioned contracts with the publisher for at least two additional solo novels he has in planning on his website. Flint, whose bibliography was dominated by collaborative work, claims that this approach encourages the cross-fertilization of ideas and styles, stimulating the creative process and preventing stale, formulaic works.

As stated in the first Grantville Gazette and on his site, Flint's novel 1632 was an experiment wherein he explores the effect of transporting a large group of people back in time, in this case an entire American town.

1632 occurs in the midst of the Thirty Years' War (1618–1648). The modern town of Grantville is transported from West Virginia back to 1632 Europe. The plot allows pragmatic, American, union-oriented, political thought to grind against the authoritarian, religion-driven societies of an unconsolidated Holy Roman Empire barely out of the Middle Ages. Flint explores examples of suffering due to the petty politics of self-aggrandizement and self-interest on the one hand, and the irreconcilable differences of the schism in Christianity such as the Protestant Reformation and the Counter-Reformation on the other. Despite the fact that the shift puts Grantville in May 1631 initially, because of the ongoing war and the primitive transportation networks of the day, Grantville's arrival has something of a delayed impact, so the bulk of the book's action takes place in 1632, hence the name.

The series was initially continued with two collaborative works that were more or less written concurrently: 1633 (with best selling novelist David Weber) and an anthology called Ring of Fire (with other established science-fiction writers, including long, "deep background" stories by both Weber and Flint).

Overall, the narratives are not oriented on one group of protagonists with a strong lead character, but instead are carried by an ensemble cast—though most books or short stories do have several strong characters who carry the action and plot forward. Flint had intended from the outset that the whole town would be the collective protagonist; a reflection of his philosophy that historic forces are not centered in the main on the actions of one or two key individuals, but on the many small independent actions of the many going about their daily lives and coping as well as they can.

By late in 1632, the New United States-led coalition of the Confederated Principalities of Europe had become the arsenal and financier (through Jewish connections of real historical interest) for Swedish King Gustavus Adolphus (the displaced Americans' intervention in history already had the effect of saving Gustavus Adolphus from being killed in the Battle of Lützen). This leads the scheming Cardinal Richelieu, who had previously been financing him to spite and weaken the Habsburgs, to turn on the Swedes. Various books from up-time Grantville, especially history books, had found avid readers amongst Europe's ruling elites, changing the plans and strategies of major players of the time. The readers, not understanding the chaotic nature of events (i.e., trivial-seeming changes can have large effects, and vice versa), often believe that these histories give them a strong idea of how they can guide events in a different direction. The "players" sent back through time have no intention of strongly guiding events, but understand how key forces (democracy, sanitation, medicine, egalitarianism, etc.) affect things in the long run to the betterment of mankind, and intend to promote and spread those even if they themselves are not "in control" of what results.

Richelieu forms a four-way alliance, the League of Ostend, to oppose the New United States, Gustavus' expeditionary army, and allied princes of the German states. After the first book, the series begins multiple plot lines or story threads reflecting this independence of action by a multitude of characters. The sequel 1633 spreads the Americans out geographically over Central Europe. Next, the novel 1634: The Galileo Affair, and the first of the anthologies called the Grantville Gazettes introduced new strong characters. The former begins what is called the South European thread, and some of the stories in the latter and Ring of Fire began the Eastern European thread (Austria-Hungary northwards to Poland).

Co-author of 1633, New York Times best-selling author David Weber was contracted for no less than five books in the series in what is called the Central European thread or Main thread of the series, but there was a delay before the two authors synchronized their schedules to write that next mainline sequel, 1634: The Baltic War, released in May 2007.

Without waiting for Weber, other sequels such as 1634: The Ram Rebellion, 1635: The Cannon Law, and the Grantville Gazettes continue in one thread or another with in-depth looks at societal ramifications from technology, religion, and social unrest as Europe deals with the outlandish ideas of Grantville's influential presence, to machinations of Europe's elites trying to maintain their hold on power, or leverage off of Grantville-triggered events or knowledge for reasons of self-interest.

== Collective collaborative effort ==
=== Grantville Gazette (2003–2022) ===
When the novel 1632 was written, Flint did not intend to write an immediate sequel. However, following popular demand for a sequel Flint (a relatively new writer, but an experienced editor) invited other authors contracted to Baen to share the universe to rapidly develop its potential. As a result, while the first long sequel was being written, Flint concurrently put together the Ring of Fire anthology of short fiction by a wide range of authors.

In parallel, the online message board Baen's Bar received a strong response from fans following the release of the digital advance copy of 1632. The forum rapidly evolved into several sub-communities, some act as technical consultant to Flint - for example on how modern technology could be implemented within the series. The high quality of fan fiction submitted to the message board prompted the creation of the official Grantville Gazette magazine that publishes short stories and factual articles as part of the official 1632 series canon, reviewed by Flint. Originally released sporadically, the Gazette eventually evolved to become an online subscription magazine, published every 2 months, with authors paid for their submissions. Several volumes of the Gazette were released in print form by Baen Books, and serialized stories that were originally published in multiple issues of the Gazette have been released in print form by The Ring of Fire Press. The Ring of Fire anthologies of commissioned short fiction also continue, with one volume approximately every 4–5 years.

The result had become a collaborative alternative history series consisting of interlinked novels and short stories, that can be regarded as adding additional layers of depth into the canon - the first level consisting of the "mainline" novels; the second level consisting of novels that take place in parallel "threads" (usually representing events in separate geographic regions); the third level consisting short fiction that has been published in print form (either drawn from the Grantville Gazette, or commissioned separately as part of the Ring of Fire anthology series); and the fourth level consisting of the stories published in the Grantville Gazette. The third and fourth levels frequently provided more in-depth background, and showed the impact of the events in the novels on the ordinary population. The entire series canon was maintained by Flint.

=== 1632 & Beyond (2023–present) ===
A year after the demise of the Grantville Gazette, some of Flint's fellow 1632 co-authors got together to form a new company called Flint's Shards Inc., which is dedicated in producing a new print and electronic magazine called Eric Flint's 1632 & Beyond (colloquially referred to as 1632 & Beyond) that would specialize in publishing short stories in the 1632 and other Assiti Shards universes on a bimonthly basis.

Every story written since issue number 3, are regularly reviewed in the multiple Hugo award nominated Tangent Online SF/F review magazine.

Issue	Date	Contents
1	September 2023	Short stories by Jody Lynn Nye, S.M. Stirling, Virginia DeMarce, Vance Garrett, and Chuck Thompson that are set in the 1632 universe, while Iver Cooper contributed a short story set in the Queen of the Seas universe and George Grant wrote a non-fiction piece.
2	November 2023	Short stories by Sean Little, Marc Tyrrell, George Grant, Iver Cooper plus the writing team of Gorg Huff and Paula Goodlett are all set in the 1632 universe with Bethanne Kim contributing a nonfiction article.
3	January 2024	Short stories by Robert E. Waters, Bethanne Kim, Marc Tyrrell, and Garrett W. Vance, all set in the 1632 universe, with Iver Cooper contributing a nonfiction article.
4	March 2024	Short stories by Bjorn Hasseler, Edith Wild, and Jack Carroll set in the 1632 universe, while Iver Cooper contributed another short story set in the Queen of the Seas universe.
5	May 2024	Short stories by Virginia DeMarce, Natalie Silk, George Grant, Marc Tyrrell, and Robert Finegold set in the 1632 universe, while Iver Cooper contributed a nonfiction article.
6	July 2024	Short stories by Virginia DeMarce, Terry Howard, Robert E. Waters, and Tim Sayeau set in the 1632 universe, while Iver Cooper contributed a nonfiction article.
7	September 2024	Short stories by Virginia DeMarce, Natalie Silk, George Grant, Marc Tyrrell, and Robert Finegold set in the 1632 universe, while Iver Cooper contributed a nonfiction article.
8	November 2024	Short stories by Garrett W. Vance, Edith Wild, Bjorn Hasseler, Terry Howard, and Bethanne Kim. This edition also introduces writer Aaron Jamieson Greso's first work in the 1632 universe. Also mentioned is the disposition of a few out-of-print Ring of Fire Press titles.
Special issues		The Christmas-themed short stories that were first published in December 2021 in the anthology A 1632 Christmas were re-released in two special issues of 1632 & Beyond as Special Issue #1 and Special Issue #2 that were released in November and December 2024 respectively.
9	January 2025	Short stories by George Grant, Terry Howard, Marc Tyrrell, Garrett W. Vance, and Tim Sayeau set in the 1632 universe, while Iver Cooper contributed a nonfiction article.
10	March 2025	Short stories by Garrett W. Vance, Virginia DeMarce, Sarah Hays, Edith Wild, and a first time literary contribution from Baen Books 1632 series cover artist Tom Kidd.
11	May 2025	Short stories or segments of longer works of fiction by Virginia DeMarce, Terry Howard, Lancelot Schaubert, Bethanne Kim, Gorg Huff, Jackie Britton Lopatin, and Mark Roth-Whitworth.
12	July 2025	Short stories that are centered around a common topic of the "Redbird Institute". Contributors included Tracy Morris, Bjorn Hasseler, George McClellan Grant, Natalie Silk, Marc Tyrrell, and Michael Knopp. Bethanne Kim contributes a piece of non-fiction.
13	September 2025	The second volume that included short stories that are centered around the common topic of the "Redbird Institute". Contributors included Garrett W. Vance, Bethanne Kim, Edith Wild, and Tom Kidd.
14	November 2025	Short stories or segments of longer works of fiction by Virginia DeMarce, Terry Howard, John Deakins, Natalie Silk, Bjorn Hasseler, and introducing David Hankins. After a several issue hiatus, Jimmy Dick returns. Tracy Morris non-fiction contribution is about what life was like a quarter century ago at the end of the twentieth century (when the first book in the series came out), and how things have changed since then.
15	January 2026	Short stories or segments of longer works of fiction by Edith Wild, Bethanne Kim, Chuck Thompson, Marc Tyrrell, David Hankins, and introducing Robert F. Lowell. In the non-fiction section, Jackie Britton Loptain writes about non-profit building restorations in Mannington, the West Virginian city that Grantville is based on.
16	March 2026	Short stories by Marc Tyrrell, Bethanne Kim, John Deakins, Jack Carroll, and Natalie Silk.
17	May 2026	Short stories by Bethanne Kim, Iver P. Cooper, David Hankins, Sarah R. Hays, Garrett W. Vance, Jack Carroll, and John Deakins.

== 1632 plot threads ==
The "mainline" novels (many of which were written by Flint alone) focus on the principal political developments within the series, along with several key characters. However, the opening of the canon to other writers allows for plot threads in other geographical regions to be explored in more details. As with real history, none of these are in isolation, and plot threads converge and diverge according to the needs of the story.

=== Main thread ===
- Novel: 1632 (2000)
- Novel: 1633 (2002) with David Weber
- Novel: 1634: The Baltic War (2007) with David Weber, the direct main thread novel sequel to 1633.
- Novel: 1635: The Eastern Front (2010)
- Novel: 1636: The Saxon Uprising (2011)
- Novel: 1636: The Ottoman Onslaught (2017)
- Novel: 1637: The Polish Maelstrom (2019)
- Novel: 1637: Their Finest Hour (TBA) with Charles Gannon

=== North-Central and Western European thread ===
The Central European thread or more correctly, the Central and Southwest Central European thread, is the main plot thread of the series. It concerns events in the region from west to east of the Kingdom of England and Kingdom of Scotland, Northern France, the Spanish Netherlands, French Netherlands, and the Dutch Republic, and the whole of western Germany eastwards to Brandenburg and the Electorate of Saxony, and southerly to the northern reaches of Bavaria. Bavaria proper, Switzerland, Austria, Bohemia, and points easterly and north are properly geographically part of the Eastern European thread.

- Anthology: Ring of Fire (2004), includes "The Wallenstein Gambit" with Mike Spehar which begins the Eastern Europe thread, "In the Navy" by David Weber, and other stories antedating 1633 in the neohistory.
- Novel: 1634: The Ram Rebellion (2006) with Virginia DeMarce, crafted as a collection of related "key developmental events". This is structured more as an anthology and includes substantial material from Paula Goodlett and other authors, but classed as a novel by the publishing trade since the stories all come together as having a related overall story arc.
- Novel: 1634: The Bavarian Crisis (2007) with Virginia DeMarce, chronological sequel to 1632, but continues the Eastern European thread.
- Anthology: Ring of Fire II (2008)
- Novel: 1635: The Dreeson Incident (2008) with Virginia DeMarce
- Novel: 1635: The Tangled Web (2009) by Virginia DeMarce
- Novel: 1635: Music and Murder (2013) by David Carrico
- Novel: 1636: The Devil's Opera (2013) by David Carrico

=== South European thread ===
The Southern European thread, or Western South Europe and South Central European thread, or perhaps more appropriately, the South-Central and Southwestern European thread, involves characters introduced in the short story "To Dye For" by Mercedes Lackey but the thread plot action proper continued in the second published novel sequel of the series, the best-selling 1634: The Galileo Affair and its direct sequel, 1635: The Cannon Law, both co-written by Flint and Andrew Dennis. The main characters are, in part, Lackey's The Stone Family, combined with Flint's Sharon Nichols and Larry Mazzare.

- Novel: 1634: The Galileo Affair (2004) with Andrew Dennis
- Novel: 1635: The Cannon Law (2006) with Andrew Dennis
- Novel: 1635: The Papal Stakes (2012) with Charles E. Gannon
- Novel: 1636: The Vatican Sanction (2017) with Charles E. Gannon

=== Eastern European thread ===
The Eastern European thread is taken to be east of modern-day Germany, Austria, and western Hungary, to include mainly modern-day Poland, Lithuania, Latvia, and parts of Ukraine and Belarus, but not Russia. The first fiction written within this thread was the novelette "The Wallenstein Gambit" and the prequel short stories leading up to it, all published in the 2004 anthology Ring of Fire.

- Novelette: "The Wallenstein Gambit", continues from two plot lines suggested in "Here Comes Santa Claus" and "A Lineman for the Country" in the same anthology.
- Serialized novel (discontinued): The Anaconda Project by Eric Flint, directly continues "The Wallenstein Gambit" and follows the establishment of a new empire with its capital at Prague. The serial was interrupted (and ultimately discontinued) in late 2009 due to the author having an unscheduled medical procedure that caused serious problems to his writing schedule. Ultimately, only 10 episodes were published in the Gazette with only eight episodes incorporated into two Baen novels.
- Novel: 1635: The Eastern Front (2010) by Eric Flint
- Novel: 1637: The Polish Maelstrom (2019) by Eric Flint (includes episodes 1–4, and 7–8 of The Anaconda Project)
- Novel: 1637: The Transylvanian Decision (2022) by Eric Flint, Robert E. Waters

=== Russian thread ===
The Russian thread was started by authors Paula Goodlett and Gorg Huff in the eighth issue of the Grantville Gazette with their introduction of the serial Butterflies in the Kremlin, which later became the novel 1636: The Kremlin Games. Goodlett and Huff have since written at least 5 novels within this thread with more on the way. The latest Russian novel, 1638: The Sovereign States, was released in September 2023.

- Novel: 1636: The Kremlin Games (2012) by Eric Flint, Gorg Huff, and Paula Goodlett
- Novel: 1637: The Volga Rules (2018) by Eric Flint, Paula Goodlett, and Gorg Huff
- RoFP Novel: A Holmes For the Czar (2020) by Gorg Huff and Paula Goodlett
- RoFP Novel: Two Cases for the Czar (2020) by Gorg Huff and Paula Goodlett
- RoFP Novel: A Mission for the Czar (2021) by Gorg Huff and Paula Goodlett
- Novel: 1638: The Sovereign States (2023) by Eric Flint, Paula Goodlett and Gorg Huff
- H&G Novel: A Diogenes Club for the Czar (2023) by Gorg Huff and Paula Goodlett

Publishing notes: RoFP Novels are books that were first published by the defunct Ring of Fire Press (2013–2022) and might be republished later by a different company under contract. H&G Novels are books that were first privately published by Gorg Huff and Paula Goodlett via Amazon (new company yet to be named). Other novels listed are books published by Baen Books.

=== Naval thread ===
This line of stories begins with the naval actions in the English Channel, North Sea and Baltic Sea and the connecting straits between the bodies of water in 1633. With the conclusion of the northern European sea actions at the end of the novel 1634: The Baltic War, the action moves to the Caribbean Sea and Western Atlantic coast of North America. At the conclusion of 1637: No Peace Beyond the Line, the naval forces are recalled to serve in the conflict with the Ottoman Empire in a forthcoming 1638 novel about the naval battles in that war.

- Novel: 1633 (2002) by Eric Flint, David Weber
- Anthology: Ring of Fire (2002) by Eric Flint et al.
- Novel: 1634: The Baltic War (2007) by Eric Flint, David Weber
- Novel: 1636: Commander Cantrell in the West Indies (2014) by Eric Flint, Charles E. Gannon
- Novel: 1636: The Atlantic Encounter (August 2020) by Eric Flint and Walter H. Hunt
- Novel: 1637: No Peace Beyond the Line (2020) by Eric Flint, Charles E. Gannon

=== The Americas thread ===
This agreement for Weber to leave aside European threads likely will follow up foreshadowings of overt dislike evinced by various Grantville natives for both the African slave trade and the Amerindian encounters with colonizing Europeans—and Flint has already written a very sympathetic, two-volume alternate history from the American Native's viewpoint in his Arkansas Wars series—and he'd written similar foreshadowings into the series' earlier works that were spun into pro-democracy and anti-anti-Semitic social themes now manifesting in the series in the Eastern Europe thread in particular, as well as an overall, muted sub-theme. This revised author's decision released a logjam of backup of other novels in the series, so that since rehashing their arrangement, 1632 series books have been released regularly every four to six months.

Stories in 1632 Slushpile regarding obtaining strategically important materials, and some that have reached publication in regard to the Essen Steel Corporation and Essen Chemical, are foreshadowing activities (mining chromium for one) in North America, and others are pursuing latex rubber in South America. In addition, the three books contracted between Flint and David Weber will in part involve expeditions sent by Gustavus and Mike Stearns to American shores.

- Ring of Fire Press (RoFP) novel: The Danish Scheme (June 2013) by Herbert Sakalaucks and Eric Flint
- Two novellas in one book: 1636: Seas of Fortune (December 2013) by Iver Cooper
  - Stretching Out: the United States of Europe seeks out oil, rubber and aluminum ore. Pioneers cross the Atlantic and found a new colony in South America.
  - Rising Sun: the changes caused by the Ring of Fire are reaching Japan. The Shogun, impressed by samples of up-time technology and influenced by information about Japan's possible future, decides to end a policy of isolation and change his country's fate forever.
- Novel: 1636: Commander Cantrell in the West Indies (June 2014) by Eric Flint and Charles E. Gannon
- RoFP novel: 1635: The Battle for Newfoundland (January 2018) by Herbert Sakalaucks
- RoFP novel: A Red Son Rises in the West (September 2019) by John Deakins and Herbert Sakalaucks
- RoFP novel: Fire on the Rio Grande (March 2020) by Kevin H. Evans and Karen C. Evans
- RoFP novel: A Red Son: Not Without Honor (July 2020) by John Deakins
- Novel: 1636: The Atlantic Encounter (August 2020) by Eric Flint and Walter H. Hunt
- Novel: 1637: No Peace Beyond the Line (November 2020) by Eric Flint and Charles E. Gannon
- Novel: 1636: Calabar's War (April 2021) by Charles E. Gannon and Robert E. Waters
- Novel: 1637: The Coast of Chaos (December 2021) by Eric Flint, Paula Goodlett, and Gorg Huff, plus authors of seven related and intertwining short stories.
- Novel: 1637: The Pacific Initiative (March 2025) by Iver Cooper

=== East Asia thread ===
- RoFP novel: The Chrysanthemum, the Cross, and the Dragon (August 2018) by Iver P. Cooper
- Novel: 1636: The China Venture (September 2019) by Eric Flint and Iver Cooper

=== South Asian Indian thread ===
- 1636: Mission to the Mughals (April 2017) by Eric Flint and Griffin Barber
- 1637: The Peacock Throne (May 2021) by Eric Flint and Griffin Barber
- 1637: The Pilgrim's Passage (August 2026) by Eric Flint and Griffin Barber

== The Ring of Fire Press ==
In June 2013, Ring of Fire Press was created to reissue certain materials originally published online in the Grantville Gazette. First, it would publish certain stories that were serialized across several issues of the Gazette, so they can be read without hunting through the various Gazette issues. Second, it would publish several themed collections of fact articles.

In 2018, the scope of Ring of Fire Press expanded, with the hiring of managing editor Walt Boyes and Joy Ward, and graphic artist Laura Givens. The release schedule was increased to two books per month, including original novels in the 1632 series (the first being 1635: The Battle for Newfoundland), collections of serialized 1632 stories, and non-1632 related novels - both new and reprinted.

The initial volumes were made available through Amazon as Kindle editions or print on demand paperback books. Later Baen began distributing selected titles for Ring of Fire Press through their web store and their other distribution channels.

On August 16, 2022, Lucille Robbins, the widow of Eric Flint, officially announced the immediate shutdown of both the Grantville Gazette and the Ring of Fire Press. Without a huge infusion of new cash, it was determined that both business ventures would not be economically viable without Flint's participation.

In April 2024, Baen announced that they planned to rerelease select books originally published by Ring of Fire Press.

== Assiti Shards novels ==
Following the success of the 1632 series, several other alternative history series were started by Eric Flint and his successors, following the same concept as 1632—that there was a time displacement caused by an "Assiti Shard".

== Literary significance and reception ==
As of 2014, four books in the series had significantly large number of sales of hardcover editions to become eligible for The New York Times Best Seller list. 1634: The Galileo Affair was on the best seller list for hardcover fiction for two weeks during April 2004 while reaching number 27. 1634: The Baltic War was on the same list for two weeks during May 2007, peaking at number 19. 1634: The Bavarian Crisis was on this list for a week in October 2007 at number 29. 1636: The Kremlin Games was on the NY Times list for a week during June 2012 at number 30.

Almost all of the books in the series sold well enough to be listed on the various Locus Bestsellers Lists, with some titles listed multiple times, and a few even reached the top spot for the month.

1635: The Papal Stakes is the first book in the series to be listed on the Wall Street Journal Best-Selling Books list.

A few titles were nominated for the Dragon Awards. 1635: A Parcel of Rogues and 1636: The Cardinal Virtues were finalists in 2016; 1636: The Ottoman Onslaught was a finalist in 2017; and Up-time Pride and Down-time Prejudice was a finalist for the Dragon Award for Best Alternate History Novel for 2020 while 1637: No Peace Beyond the Line has been awarded the Dragon Award for Best Alternate History Novel for 2021. In 2022, 1637: Dr. Gribbleflotz and the Soul of Stoner was a finalist for Best Alternate History Novel. In 2024, 1638: The Sovereign States was a finalist for Best Alternate History Novel. In 2025, 1635: The Weaver's Code was a finalist for Best Alternate History Novel.

== See also ==
- Nantucket series
