= The Grantville Gazettes =

Anthologies of short stories inspired by Eric Flint's novel 1632

Grantville Gazette
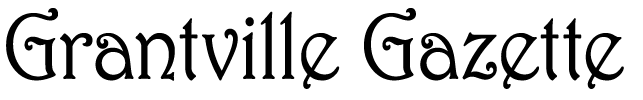
- Editors: Eric Flint (2003–2022); Paula Goodlett (2007–2015); Walt Boyes (2015–2022); Bjorn Hassler (2015–2022)
- Language: English
- Series: 1632 series
- Genre: Alternate History, Anthology
- Publisher: Baen Books
- Publication date: Semi-periodic, and Periodic (bi-monthly); Various dates from February 2003 and from 2004 (in print as books)
- Publication place: United States
- Media type: e-zine and ebook Paperback and hardcover
- Website: last snapshot of website

The Grantville Gazettes were a series of anthologies of short stories set in the 1632 universe introduced in Eric Flint's novel 1632 that was published as a bi-monthly electronic magazine from 2003 until shortly after Flint's death in 2022.

The Gazettes started as an experiment: a professionally edited, officially sanctioned "fan magazine" published electronically. Initially released as serialized e-magazines, they were later published as e-books (taking a page from the Baen Books experience with E-ARCs—Electronic Advance Reader Copies, which had been instituted several years earlier.) Because the electronic sales were successful, Baen contracted with Flint for more issues, to be published 3-4 times per year (bimonthly, starting in 2007). Each would form part of the canonical background for the other works (novels and anthologies) in the rapidly growing 1632 series.

By mid-2012, e-magazines were published bimonthly, and six books had been published (five of those as both hardcover and mass market paperback) excerpted from the first 17 issues of the magazine. Grantville Gazette IX was published in July 2021.

After two decades of operations, the magazine celebrated the electronic release of its 100th volume in March 2022.

On August 16, 2022, Lucille Robbins, the widow of Eric Flint, officially announced the immediate shutdown of both The Grantville Gazette and the Ring of Fire Press. Without a huge infusion of new cash, it was determined that both business ventures would not be economically viable without Flint's participation.

The final electronic issue, Volume 102, was released in July 2022, while the final hardcopy book version, Grantville Gazette IX (ISBN 978-1982125455), was released in July 2021.

In June 2023, it was announced that a new company, Flint's Shards Inc., had signed a contract with Lucille Robbins, Eric Flint's widow and heir, to produce a new electronic magazine called Eric Flint's 1632 & Beyond that will be released bimonthly on the first day of odd-numbered months with Bjorn Hasseler as Editor-in-Chief starting September 2023.

== Print publication ==
Starting in November 2004, the first Gazette was also released experimentally in a paper edition with issue I as a paperback. The second volume was released in hardcover in March 2006, this and subsequent titles use Roman Numerals for titles such as are listed below in the section List of Gazettes, as appear on the print publication covers.

Each print edition contains an additional story that was not published in any e-magazine. Starting with volume V, each print edition contains stories from several of the magazines, and not all magazine stories are published in the books. The List of Gazettes section below gives the publication dates and a rough guide to which magazines are collected into particular books.

Print title	Publication date	ISBN	e-Vols covered	Additional Flint story
Grantville Gazette I	November 2004	0-7434-8860-1	Whole issue 1	Portraits
Grantville Gazette II	March 2006	1-4165-2051-1	Whole issue 2	Steps In The Dance
Grantville Gazette III	January 2007	1-4165-0941-0	Whole issue 3	Postage Due
Grantville Gazette IV	June 2008	1-4165-5554-4	Whole issue 4	The Anatomy Lesson
Grantville Gazette V	August 2009	1-4391-3279-8	From issues 5–10	Steady Girl
Grantville Gazette VI	January 2012	1-4516-3853-1	From issues 11–19	The Masque
Grantville Gazette VII	April 2015	978-1476780290	From issues 20–30	An Aukward Situation
Grantville Gazette VIII	June 2018	978-1481483292	From issues 31–45	Descartes Before the Whores
Grantville Gazette IX	July 2021	978-1982125455	From issues 46–64	Nasty, Brutish and Short

=== Overall literary criticism and reception of the printed versions ===
Sales of the printed versions of the Grantville Gazette I and Grantville Gazette II were high enough to have these issues listed on the Locus (magazine) Bestsellers Lists with Volume I topping at number 9 in 2005 for Paperbacks and Volume II at 10 in 2006 for Hardcovers respectively.

Overall, most reviewers wrote favorable reviews while only a small number were negative. A reviewer for Booklist wrote that "Flint's 1632 universe seems to be inspiring a whole new crop of gifted alternate historians."

=== Reception of printed volumes that do not have their own page yet ===
==== Grantville Gazette IV ====
The reviewer for Observe and See wrote that the printed version of the Grantville Gazette IV is "It is every bit as enjoyable as the other editions" and reviewed each story in this edition. The reviewer for The Billion Light-Year Bookshelf wrote extensive individual reviews for each of the included stories. The reviewer also noted that one of the stories from the Gazette was a part of the backstory of one of the novels that she had previously reviewed.

==== Grantville Gazette V ====
The reviewer for Booklist wrote that the printed edition of the Grantville Gazette V "add[s] dimensions to Flint's singular alternate-history creation." The reviewer for The Billion Light-Year Bookshelf wrote individual reviews for each of the included stories. Most were positive, however she did warn the reader that at least one story could be incomprehensible unless the reader have already read most of the books in the series.

==== Grantville Gazette VI ====
The reviewer for the San Francisco Book Review wrote that "all of the stories are well-written and peopled with fascinating characters." The reviewer for the Library Journal also gave a positive review.

==== Grantville Gazette VII ====
The reviewer for the SFRevu wrote that "The stories run quite a gamut. There are mysteries, action adventure, and little bit of rewritten history." Some of the stories are quirky and that "the characters have a sense of humor" while some of the other "stories aren't all humorous, they also deal with subjects related to inequality and opportunity. The reviewer also wrote that "Another really good part of the series, is the serious discussion of technology and how old technologies can be recreated until the equipment needed to build the modern technology is available." The reviewer also states that "The Gazette has been a pipeline for developing authors." The reviewer for the Midwest Book Review wrote that the book "provides a lively set of vignettes and tales that juxtapose well with the primary books in the series and fill in many gaps with new stories and new information".

== The Ring of Fire Press ==
Many of the continuing serials had been republished as single volume collections by the publishers of the Gazette through their own Ring of Fire Press to make the material easier to access by its readers by not having its readers search through various Gazette back issues to access a previous episode of a particular serial.

== Short story awards ==
Starting in 2017, the Gazette began to offer an award for the best short story that was published during the previous calendar year as determined by its readers.

Year	Title	Authors	Issue
2016	The Winter Canvas: A Daniel Block Story	Meriah L. Crawford and Robert E. Waters	67
2017	The Long Road Home, Part 2	Nick Lorance	69
2018	Requiem For the Future	David Carrico	76
2019	Clique, Clique, Boom	Bjorn Hasseler	82
2020	First Kiss	Tim Roesch	90

== Jim Baen's Universe ==
Starting with magazine issue #19, another Baen magazine was merged into the Grantville Gazette. For the next ten issues, there was no change in the Gazettes beyond a dual title on the title page. In magazine issue #30, Eric Flint introduced the "Universe Annex" to the Grantville Gazette featuring a story slot and columns from Jim Baen's Universe.

== See also ==
- Ring of Fire (anthology)
- Ring of Fire II (anthology)
- Ring of Fire III (anthology)
- 1634: The Ram Rebellion (melded novel/anthology)
- 1635: The Tangled Web (melded novel/anthology)
- 1636: The Kremlin Games (serialized novel)
