= Midwest Book Review =

US publisher

- Organization logo
- Formation: 1976
- Legal status: Active
- Purpose: Book reviews
- Headquarters: Oregon, Wisconsin
- Region served: California, Wisconsin, upper Midwest
- Official language: English
- Editor-in-Chief: James A. Cox
- Website: www.midwestbookreview.com

Midwest Book Review, established in 1976, produces nine book-review publications per month.

== Organization ==
Midwest Book Review was established in 1976. The editor-in-chief of the organization is James A. Cox. The review puts out nine publications on a monthly basis, with a focus on community and academic library organizations, booksellers, and the general reading public.

Publications produced by the organization include: The Bookwatch, California Bookwatch, The Children's Bookwatch, Internet Bookwatch, Library Bookwatch, MBR Bookwatch, The Midwest Bookwatch, The Reviewer's Bookwatch, Small Press Bookwatch, and The Wisconsin Bookwatch. The Children's Bookwatch is a newsletter made as a resource for librarians. Some reviews from Reviewer's Bookwatch are provided in greater depth at the organization's website. Midwest Book Review is made up of volunteers, and frequently seeks additional individuals to serve as book reviewers for the organization. The organization is located in Oregon, Wisconsin. It has a motivation of increasing literacy, public utilization of libraries, and fostering small press, to which it gives priority. Of the 1,500 books submitted to Midwest Book Review for consideration per month, the organization chooses to review approximately 450 of them.

A visitor to the website Amazon.com emailed Cox in 2006 and asked about the organization's practice of giving all reviews posted to the site a five-star recommendation. Cox replied explaining that he disagreed with the star-rating system in general, and noted that reviewed books pass an initial screening. In 2007, an author asked Cox about the organization's position with regard to Amazon.com ratings. Cox explained, "for a book to make it all the way through the Midwest Book Review process. ... it merited the highest recommendation available under the Amazon rating system. Inferior books, flawed books, substandard books are assumed to have been weeded out and never made it to the 'finish line' of publication in one of our book review magazines."

In a 2001 interview with The Denver Post, Cox stated that Midwest Book Review considers submissions from print on demand (POD) publications. Cox does not believe that book reviewers should be fee-based, and said, "Any reviewer that wants money from you for any purpose whatsoever is operating a scam, engaging in unethical behavior that is in violation of the publishing industry etiquette norm." In 2008, Midwest Book Review had gained reviewers as a result of cutbacks in print media publications. Cox noted, "The drastic cutbacks in newspaper and magazine space for reviews has redounded to the benefit of the Midwest Book Review and other online review sites. These displaced reviewers have turned to us as an outlet for their reviews previously published in print sources. Over the past few years we have gained at least ten reviewers this way." After stating that charging fees is a scam, Cox began charging a reading fee in 2011. However, those fees are sent directly from the author to their assigned reviewer. Mr. Cox, nor does any of his MBR employees/volunteers, collect any fees for themselves. Initially fees were only charged for e-books, but since then has expanded to include any "ebooks, pre-publication manuscripts, galleys, uncorrected proofs, ARCs, and pdf files".

== Impact and reputation ==
Every review produced by Midwest Book Review is indexed to the review index maintained by Gale Research. Book Review Index indexes reviews for the Midwest Book Review publications Bookwatch and Children's Bookwatch. Online Computer Library Center described the website of the Midwest Book Review as "a resource to locate book reviews, resources and advice for writers and publishers". Writing and Publishing: The Librarian's Handbook published by the American Library Association recommends Midwest Book Review as a resource for information for writers.

Midwest Book Review is listed as a resource, in Doris Booth's Writer's Handbook of FAQs.

== See also ==
- Kirkus Reviews
- Publishers Weekly
- The New York Times Book Review
