= Thomas Kidd (illustrator) =

American illustrator (born 1955)

- Born: August 10, 1955; Tampa, Florida
- Known for: Fantasy and science fiction illustration

Thomas Kidd (born August 10, 1955) is an American science fiction and fantasy illustrator who lives in New Milford, Connecticut.

== History ==
Thomas Kidd was born August 10, 1955, in Tampa, Florida. Kidd described himself as a "scatterbrained" child, but he had a quick talent for drawing and was able to capture nearly anything he saw accurately with paper and pencil. However, when he recognized that cameras were able to create realistic images quicker and more accurately than he could, he turned to drawing the creations of his mind. Kidd particularly credits Chesley Bonestell and Norman Rockwell as his most formative influences.

Kidd received a scholarship to Syracuse University, but dropped out after two years in the program. He moved to New York City to become a professional artist and, after a difficult start, began to see some success as an illustrator.

Since then, Kidd has illustrated two books, The Three Musketeers and The War of the Worlds, and is currently at work on a book called Gnemo: Airships, Adventure, Exploration. A collection of his art, The Tom Kidd Sketchbook, is also available. He has painted the cover artwork for numerous paperback novels published by William Morrow, Random House, Warner Books, Doubleday, St. Martin's Press and Tor Books, as well as Marvel Comics.

He has also illustrated cards for Last Unicorn Games' collectible card game Heresy: Kingdom Come.

Kidd is also a designer; his design work has been seen in films, theme parks and figurines for many clients, including Walt Disney Feature Animation and Mayfair Games. He has exhibited work in numerous galleries, including the Delaware Art Museum and the NASA Future Art Expedition.

== Awards ==
Kidd's achievements include:

- 4 Hugo nominations (1985, 1987, 1988, 1990)
- 7 Chesley Awards, including: 2002 (Interior Illustration, Best Monochrome Work - Unpublished); 2003 (Artistic Achievement)
- AnLab Award (Analog magazine): 1987 (for cover of Marooned in Realtime)
- Golden Pagoda Award: 1990 (Best Artist)
- 2003 World Fantasy Award for Best Artist
