= Eric Flint =

American author and editor (1947–2022)

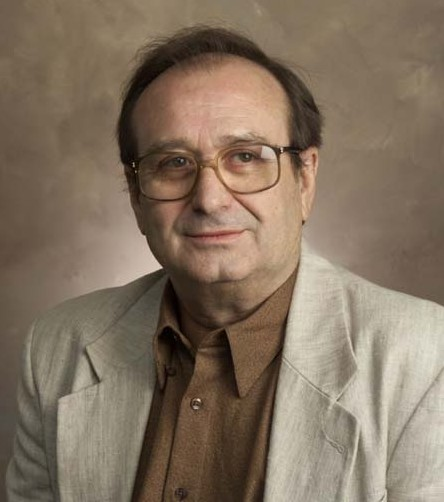
- Flint in 2007
- Born: February 6, 1947; Burbank, California, U.S.
- Died: July 17, 2022 (aged 75); East Chicago, Indiana, U.S.
- Occupations: Novelist; short story author; editor; e-publisher
- Writing career
- Genres: Science fiction, fantasy, alternate history
- Notable work: 1632
- Website: Last snapshot of Eric Flint's official website at the Wayback Machine (archived 2021-08-02)

Eric Flint (February 6, 1947 – July 17, 2022) was an American author, editor, and e-publisher. The majority of his works are alternate history science fiction, but he also wrote humorous fantasy adventures. His works have been listed on The New York Times, The Wall Street Journal, The Washington Post, and Locus magazine best-seller lists. He was a co-founder and editor of the Baen Free Library.

== Early life and education ==
Born in 1947 in Burbank, California, Flint worked on a Ph.D. in history specializing in southern African history. He left his doctoral program to become a political activist in the labor movement. He supported himself from that time until age 50 in a variety of jobs, including longshoreman, truck driver, machinist, and labor union organizer. As a long-time leftist political activist, Flint worked as a member of the Socialist Workers Party.

== Career ==
After winning the fourth quarter of 1993 Writers of the Future contest, he published his first novel in 1997 and moved to full-time writing in 1999.

Shortly afterwards, he became the first librarian of the Baen Free Library and a prominent anti–copy protection activist. He has edited the works of several classic science fiction authors, repackaging their short stories into collections and fix-up novels. This project met commercial success and returned several out-of-print authors to print.

In 2004, he was faced with a persistent drain on his time by fan fiction authors seeking comment on the four-year-old 1632 Tech Manual web forum focused on his 1632 series. In the same year, he suggested to Jim Baen the experimental serialized fan fiction e-zine The Grantville Gazette, which also found commercial success. Four of the Gazette magazine editions were collated into anthology formats, bought by Jim Baen and brought out in hardcover, paperback, or both formats. The last one purchased remains unpublished. Subsequently, Flint became editor of the new Jim Baen's Universe science-fiction e-zine while concurrently remaining a creative writer bringing out three to five titles annually. After the death of Jim Baen due to a stroke and completing the contract for the tenth Grantville Gazette, Flint founded a new website, grantvillegazette.com, which was modeled on the JBU e-zine. It continued to bring out The Grantville Gazettes and increased the publishing rate from four annually to bimonthly, which paid better than standard magazine pay rates.

He lived with his wife Lucille (also an ex-labor organizer) in East Chicago, Indiana.

In 2008, he donated his archive to the department of Rare Books and Special Collections at Northern Illinois University.

Flint was the author guest of honor for the 2010 NASFiC, ReConStruction.

He also participated in The Stellar Guild series published by Phoenix Pick. The series pairs bestselling authors with lesser known authors in science fiction and fantasy to help provide additional visibility to them.

== Electronic publishing ==
Eric Flint is noted as a co-founder and editor of the Baen Free Library. The library is an ongoing experiment in electronic publishing where Flint and Jim Baen advocated for the availability of unprotected e-books in multiple online formats. This initiative aimed to assess whether offering free electronic versions of books could boost sales of their print or paid electronic counterparts. As part of the initial phase, Flint has published a series of essays that in form have been part of blog and letters to the editor tracking the experiment and championing the practice.

Baen Books have adopted a model of unencrypted e-book publication for all their works, providing works in various common formats. This approach is often applied to the early volumes of ongoing series, with the intent that readers may purchase subsequent installments. New releases are also available as e-books in the same unencrypted formats as the free library through Baen WebScriptions. With this model, subscribers can purchase a monthly collection of five bundled works in the release stage of publication. Once the bundle reaches four months from its scheduled release date in print, about half of the work is serialized and available to readers purchasing the advanced peek. A month later, the next quarter, followed by the last quarter, available about a month on average ahead of any printed work. The last delivery contains the copyedited e-book version of the book.

In addition to the bundled offerings, electronic Advanced Reader Copies (ARCs) can be purchased separately. These followed a successful experiment with an online eMagazine, called the Grantville Gazette (see 1632 series). These ARCs are unproofed manuscripts and may contain numerous errors and typos. However these are released before the first part of the monthly bundles. These copies do not include the final proofed version, which is available only in the single or monthly bundle for that book. In March 2007, Flint began acting as publisher of a for-free web-access version of the gazette.

Flint also helmed Jim Baen's Universe, an e-zine published from 2006 until 2010.

== Death and tributes ==
Flint died on July 17, 2022, at the age of 75 in East Chicago, Indiana.

In February 2024, WordFire Press released an alternative history anthology, A Bit of Luck: Alternate Histories in Honor of Eric Flint (ISBN 978-1-68057-613-9) as a memorial work. Edited by Lisa Mangum, the anthology included 20 short stories by authors that included Charles E. Gannon and Kevin J. Anderson with profits supporting the endowment fund for Superstars Writing Seminars.

== Reception ==
To date, six of his books have been included on The New York Times Best Seller list. They are 1634: The Galileo Affair (2004), 1634: The Baltic War (2007), 1634: The Bavarian Crisis (2007), 1636: The Kremlin Games (2013), Torch of Freedom (2009), and Cauldron of Ghosts (2014).

1635: The Papal Stakes (2012), The Crucible of Empire (2010), and Threshold (2010) were listed on The Wall Street Journal Best-Selling Books list for Hardcover Science Fiction.

Cauldron of Ghosts (2014) was listed on The Washington Post Best-Selling Books list for Hardcover Fiction.

Almost all of Flint's books sold well enough to get listed on the various Locus Bestsellers Lists with some titles listed multiple times and a few even reached the top spot for the month.

== Awards and honors ==
Flint was awarded the 2008 Dal Coger Memorial Hall of Fame Award primarily for his River of War series.

In 2018, he received a Special Sidewise Award for Alternate History for his encouragement of the genre of alternate history through his support of the community and writers developed around his 1632 series.

Several months after his death, Flint received the 2023 Best Alt-History award for 1812: The Rivers of War and the 2023 Frank Herbert Lifetime Achievement Award from The Helicon Society.
