= List of alternate history fiction =

This is a list of alternate history fiction, sorted primarily by type and then chronologically.

== Standalone novels ==
Year	Title	Author	Description
=== Pre-19th century ===
1490	Tirant lo Blanch	Joanot Martorell	A knight from Brittany stops the Turks from taking Constantinople.
=== 19th century ===
1836	Napoleon and the Conquest of the World	Louis Geoffroy	Napoleon's First French Empire emerges victorious in the French invasion of Russia in 1811 and in an invasion of England in 1814, later unifying the world under Bonaparte's rule.
1845	P.'s Correspondence	Nathaniel Hawthorne	A New Englander is treated as a madman because of being able to perceive a different reality in which long-dead famous people are still alive (though not necessarily well) in 1845: the poets Burns, Byron, Shelley, and Keats, the actor Edmund Kean, the British politician George Canning and even Napoleon Bonaparte.
1876	Uchronie (Uchronia)	Charles Renouvier	The Nerva–Antonine emperors ban Christians.
1895	Aristopia	Castello Holford	The earliest settlers in Virginia discover a reef made of solid gold and are able to build a Utopian society in North America.
=== 1930s ===
1931	If It Had Happened Otherwise	Edited by J. C. Squire	A collection of alternate history essays.
1935	It Can't Happen Here	Sinclair Lewis	While Hitler is coming to power in Europe, a fascist candidate becomes President of the USA taking complete control as a dictator.
1939	Lest Darkness Fall	L. Sprague de Camp	An American archaeologist is transported to 6th century Rome (AD 535).
=== 1950s ===
1952	The Sound of His Horn	John William Wall	A British naval lieutenant awakens in a Nazi controlled world 102 years on from World War II.
1953	Bring the Jubilee	Ward Moore	The South is not defeated in the American Civil War because it wins the Battle of Gettysburg.
=== 1960s ===
1962	The Man in the High Castle	Philip K. Dick	The Axis powers win World War II.
1966	The Gate of Time	Philip José Farmer	An Iroquois combat pilot finds himself in a world where the New World is underwater and Native Americans settled in Eastern Europe.
1967	The Gate of Worlds	Robert Silverberg	The Black Death of the 14th century kills three-quarters of the European population. Seven centuries later, the main powers are Russia, Turkey, the Aztecs, the Incas, and Japan.
1968	The Last Starship from Earth	John Boyd	Jesus Christ becomes a revolutionary agitator and assembles an army to overthrow the Roman Empire and establish a theocracy, which has lasted until the present day.
1968	Pavane	Keith Roberts	Queen Elizabeth I is assassinated, and in the ensuing disorder, the Spanish Armada is successful in suppressing Protestantism in England.
1969	The Bomb That Failed (British, The Last Year of the Old World)	Ronald W. Clark	The failure of the Trinity test in June 1945 leads to an American invasion of Japan.
=== 1970s ===
1970	All Evil Shed Away	Archie Roy	Due to the assassination of Winston Churchill in 1940, Nazi Germany wins World War II and is locked in a cold war with the United States.
1971	Lighter than a Feather	David Westheimer	The Americans invade Japan in November 1945 as part of Operation Downfall.
1972	The Iron Dream	Norman Spinrad	Adolf Hitler emigrates from Germany to America and uses his modest artistic skills to become first a pulp science fiction illustrator and later a science fiction writer.
1972	Tunnel Through the Deeps	Harry Harrison	Moors win the Battle of Las Navas de Tolosa on 16 July 1212 on the Iberian peninsula. John Cabot discovers America, and George Washington is shot as a traitor.
1973	For Want of a Nail	Robert N. Sobel	The American Revolution fails and the British colonies become the Confederation of North America (CNA), while the defeated rebels go into exile in Spanish Tejas, eventually founding the United States of Mexico (USM).
1973	The Ultimate Solution	Eric Norden	A world resulting from a total Nazi and Imperial Japanese victory in World War II and partition of the world between them.
1974	Das Königsprojekt	Carl Amery	The Roman Catholic Church attempts to restore the House of Stuart to the English throne by altering history through the use of a time machine invented by Leonardo da Vinci.
1975	Hitler Has Won	Frederic Mullally	Alternate 1942. Japan strikes north rather than south, the Soviet Union falls, Germany is unassailable in Europe. There is a plot to defeat the Roman Catholic Church and install Hitler as the new Pope.
1975	The Female Man	Joanna Russ	One of the multiple fictional worlds where the novel is set is an alternative 1969 where the Great Depression never ended and World War II never started, so there were no significant feminist movements.
1975	The Whenabouts of Burr	Michael Kurland	Alternate 1997. The U.S. Constitution has been stolen and replaced by one from an alternate world with Aaron Burr's signature in place of that of Alexander Hamilton. Sleuths are led through a series of alternate Americas.
1976	The Alteration	Kingsley Amis	Martin Luther, rather than beginning the Protestant Reformation, becomes pope.
1978	And Having Writ...	Donald R. Bensen	Four aliens arrive on Earth in 1908 and try to advance human technology so they can return home.
1978	Gloriana	Michael Moorcock	Queen Gloriana rules over "Albion", an alternative British Empire that rules over America and Asia.
1978	SS-GB	Len Deighton	Detective novel set in 1941 in a Britain occupied by the Germans.
=== 1980s ===
1980	The Divide	William Overgard	Set in 1976, thirty years after Nazi Germany and Imperial Japan have defeated the United States in World War II.
1980	The Moscow Option	David Downing	The German Army conquers Moscow at the end of 1941.
1983	The Burning Mountain: A Novel of the Invasion of Japan	Alfred Coppel	During World War II, a lightning strike at the Trinity test postpones deployment of the atomic bomb, forcing the U.S. to invade Japan.
1983	The Dragon Waiting: A Masque of History	John M. Ford	Fantasy alternate history combining vampires, the Medicis, and the convoluted English politics surrounding Edward IV and Richard III.
1983	Kelly Country	A. Bertram Chandler	Australian bushranger and rebel Ned Kelly leads a successful revolution against British colonial rule. The result is that Australia becomes a world power, but the Australian Republic which Kelly founded degenerates into a hereditary dictatorship.
1983	A Rebel in Time	Harry Harrison	A racist colonel wants to change history by helping the CSA win the American Civil War.
1984	The Bush Soldiers	John Hooker	The Japanese successfully conquer and occupy most of the coastal fringe of Australia.
1984	Job: A Comedy of Justice	Robert A. Heinlein	A man is thrust on a whirlwind tour of numerous parallel universes, at least three of which have William Jennings Bryan elected to the US presidency, each time under different circumstances.
1985	The Proteus Operation	James P. Hogan	A group of military commandos, diplomats, and scientists travel back to 1939 and try to prevent the Axis Powers from winning World War II.
1986	The Crystal Empire	L. Neil Smith	The Black Death kills 85 percent of Europe's population. Like in other novels with this premise, Muslims conquer Europe in the centuries afterwards and become a dominant world power by the 20th century. Smith also postulates the plague wiping out the Mongol Empire as well, allowing the Mughal Empire to grow faster and farther in its place.
1986	The Coming of the Quantum Cats	Frederik Pohl	Features the protagonist travelling across multiple different worlds. In one world, Nancy Reagan is the President of the United States and her mostly disregarded husband Ronald is known as "The First Gentleman". John F. Kennedy is a Senator from Massachusetts who is married to Marilyn Monroe. In another, America is a fascist dictatorship where Ronald Reagan remained true to his early left-wing politics and is still married to his first wife Jane Wyman, and in the past of many of the alternate worlds Joseph Stalin (who is known as Joseph Dzhugashvili) escaped from Russia to America in the 1900s, taking with him the proceeds of the 1907 Tiflis bank robbery and using the money to set himself up as a big American capitalist.
1987	Agent of Byzantium	Harry Turtledove	Imperial Byzantine special agent Basil Argyros is sent on various missions in an alternate universe where Muhammad became a Christian saint.
1987	In Search of the Epitaph	Bok Koh-il	In 1909, Itō Hirobumi survives his assassination attempt by An Jung-geun and succeeds in a complete Japanization of Koreans, which leads to the Empire of Japan dominating Korea by 1987.
1988	Alternities	Michael P. Kube-McDowell	
1988	The Armor of Light	Melissa Scott and Lisa A. Barnett	Sir Philip Sidney and Christopher Marlowe survive their historical deaths to battle witchcraft in the courts of Elizabeth I and James VI.
1988	A Different Flesh	Harry Turtledove	Homo erectus crossed into the New World instead of the ancestors of the Native Americans, leaving the Pleistocene biosphere intact at the time of the 17th century AD.
1988	Fire on the Mountain	Terry Bisson	John Brown succeeds in his raid on Harpers Ferry and touches off a slave rebellion in 1859.
1988	Gray Victory	Robert Skimin	The Confederacy wins its independence and places Jeb Stuart on trial for losing the Battle of Gettysburg.
1988	The New Dinosaurs: An Alternative Evolution	Dougal Dixon	Non-avian dinosaurs do not die out 65 million years ago but instead keep the mammals in small rodent-like forms.
=== 1990s ===
1990	The Difference Engine	William Gibson and Bruce Sterling	Charles Babbage's Analytical Engine takes on the roles of modern computers a century earlier.
1990	The World Next Door	Brad Ferguson	People from a world that experienced a nuclear war in 1962 interact with people from a world that did not.
1990	A World of Difference	Harry Turtledove	The 4th planet of the Solar System, named Minerva instead of Mars, is larger and contains intelligent alien life. The only stated change in Earth history is that Mikhail Gorbachev died shortly after taking leadership of the Soviet Union in 1985, and was succeeded by a hardline government so that Glasnost never happened.
1992	Fatherland	Robert Harris	Set in the 1960s in a Germany which won World War II.
1992	The Guns of the South	Harry Turtledove	The Confederate Army is supplied with AK-47s by early-21st century white supremacist South African time-travelers.
1992	Konpeki no Kantai	Yoshio Aramaki	World War II lasts ten years, Japan becomes a stronger naval power thanks to Admiral Isoroku Yamamoto who appears several years in the past despite dying in the actual World War II. It is later adapted into two OVA series, in which at first Japan defeats the Western Allies in the Pacific but eventually teams up with them to fight Nazi Germany.
1992	Resurrections from the Dustbin of History	Simon Louvish	Following Rosa Luxemburg's successful 1918 revolution in Germany, Hitler flees to the USA. He becomes a senator for Illinois, and his son Rudolph runs for president in 1968 on a racist platform. Trotsky defeats Stalin in Russia, while Mussolini hangs on to power in Italy.
1993	Anti-Ice	Stephen Baxter	Explosive scientific discovery made in the 1850s advances technology.
1993	Aztec Century	Christopher Evans	Cortez changes sides at the onset of the Conquistador era in the early 16th century, leading to the repulsion of Spanish invasion and occupation of Central America.
1993	Down in the Bottomlands	Harry Turtledove	At the end of the Miocene period, the Mediterranean stays dry to the present day.
1993	Elvissey	Jack Womack	A dystopian 2033 where a Machiavellian multinational corporation has plans for world domination.
1993	The Case of the Toxic Spell Dump	Harry Turtledove	Fantasy with an alternate history undercurrent. History unfolded much as it did in our world, except that magic took the place of science. For example, Adolf Hitler waged a brutal war in the 20th century with magic weapons, Werner Heisenberg defined the uncertainty principle of thaumaturgy, and flying carpets take the place of automobiles. However, there are some fundamental differences, e.g., the United States and Mexico are both ruled by hereditary monarchies. Most importantly, the gods of all mythologies and religions are literal, proven beings, who coexist in a henotheistic world in relative harmony – a breach in this latter harmony is central to the novel's main conflict.
1995	1901	Robert Conroy	Depicts a hypothetical war between Germany and the United States at the start of William McKinley's second term as president.
1995	1945	Newt Gingrich and William R. Forstchen	Germans perfect long-range jet aircraft by the end of World War II and conduct successful raids in North America against the US nuclear program.
1995	Dead, Mr. Mozart	Bernard Bastable	Wolfgang Mozart settles in England as a young man and never returns to his native Austria. As a respected but fairly impoverished composer and piano teacher in the 1820s (30 years after his death in our timeline), he is unwillingly pulled into a scandalous intrigue involving close relatives of King George IV. It is later followed by a sequel, Too Many Notes, Mr. Mozart.
1995	The Two Georges	Harry Turtledove and Richard Dreyfuss	King George III of Great Britain and George Washington reach a settlement where the Thirteen Colonies remain within the British Empire with increased autonomy and virtually all of their grievances redressed.
1996	Attentatet i Pålsjö skog	Hans Alfredson	Swedish communists blow up a German train passing through Sweden, killing Eva Braun, who was on board, Hitler is furious and invades Sweden, which surrenders.
1996	Celestial Matters	Richard Garfinkle	The physics of this world and its surrounding cosmos are based on the physics of Aristotle and ancient Chinese Taoist alchemy.
1996	Pastwatch: The Redemption of Christopher Columbus	Orson Scott Card	Scientists from the future travel back to the 15th century to prevent the European colonization of the Americas.
1996	Voyage	Stephen Baxter	The United States conducts a Mars landing in 1986 as a result of inspiration by John F. Kennedy, who survived the assassination attempt on him in 1963.
1997	Back in the USSA	Eugene Byrne and Kim Newman	The United States experiences a communist revolution in 1917 and becomes a communist superpower, while Russia does not.
1997	Xavras Wyżryn	Jacek Dukaj	Poland falls to the Red Army and becomes a Soviet republic in 1920. In an alternate 1996, Polish partisans fight the Soviet army.
1997	K is for Killing	Daniel Easterman	Charles Lindbergh is elected president rather than Franklin Delano Roosevelt and a fascist organization calling itself the Amero-Aryan Alliance is brought to power and turns the country into a police state, complete with slavery concentration camps, and ghettos.
1997	Making History	Stephen Fry	A time traveler creates a history in which Hitler was never conceived, let alone born.
1998	Darwinia	Robert Charles Wilson	In March 1912, an event some called the "Miracle" causes Europe and parts of Asia and Africa to completely disappear along with all its inhabitants, replacing it with a slice of an alien planet, roughly equal in outline and terrain features, but with strange flora and fauna that have evolved differently to anything on Earth. America becomes involved in an effort to re-settle and colonise the new Europe, with historical figures such as Lord Kitchener (having survived past 1916 due to the absence of WW1) trying to preserve the British Empire and re-settle Britain.
1999	Battle Royale	Koushun Takami	Japan wins World War II and over 50 years later, children are pitted against each other in a game to the death.
1999	Finity	John Barnes	Set in 2026, the world is ruled by descendants of the victorious World War II Axis powers, and the United States has mysteriously disappeared from the structure of reality.
1999	Resurrection Day	Brendan DuBois	The Cuban Missile Crisis ends in a brief nuclear exchange between the U.S. and Soviet Union that wiped out several cities and has led to America being under military rule.
1999	The Intuitionist	Colson Whitehead	In a city heavily implied to be an alternate New York City in an unspecified time, huge skyscrapers litter the landscape and require vertical transportation in the form of elevators. Black people are referred to as 'coloured' and integration is a current topic. Elevator maintenance is divided between 'Intuitionists' who prefer to ride in an elevator and intuit the state of the elevator based on their own personal feelings, and the 'Empiricists', who insist on traditional instrument-based verification methods to assess the condition of the elevator.
1999	Die Mauer steht am Rhein ("The Wall Stands on the Rhine")	Christian von Ditfurth	The Cold War ends with Germany being reunified under the government of the communist German Democratic Republic.
=== 2000s ===
2000	Fox on the Rhine	Douglas Niles and Michael Dobson	Heinrich Himmler takes over as leader after Hitler is assassinated in 1944 and arranges a cease-fire with the Soviet Union to free German forces. He then appoints Erwin Rommel to command over the German forces in Western Europe.
2001	After Dachau	Daniel Quinn	Germany wins World War II and eventually all non-whites are killed off.
2001	The Children's War	J. N. Stroyar	In World War II, Germany does not attack the Soviet Union and develops a nuclear weapons program. There is a 2004 sequel, A Change of Regime.
2001	The Haunting of Alaizabel Cray	Chris Wooding	Victorian London is overrun by the wych-kin, demonic creatures that have rendered the city uninhabitable south of the river, and which stalk the streets after dark.
2002	Lion's Blood	Steven Barnes	The novel presents an alternate world where an Islamic Africa is the center of technological progress and learning while Europe remains largely tribal and backward. The story begins with Aidan O'Dere, a White European child growing up in a primitive 19th century Ireland with his pagan father, Christian mother, and his twin sister. Their village is attacked by Vikings and Aidan and the surviving members of his family are taken as slaves.
2002	Ice	Shane Johnson	The Apollo 19 mission suffers a major system failure, forcing its crew to strike out on their own.
2002	The Peshawar Lancers	S. M. Stirling	In 1878, a meteor shower devastates Europe and North America, forcing the European empires to relocate their populations to their colonies.
2002	Ruled Britannia	Harry Turtledove	The Spanish Armada conquers England and forces Shakespeare to write a play about Philip II. At the same time he is secretly writing a play for the English underground resistance.
2002	Uncle Alf	Harry Turtledove	The German Empire triumphs over its enemies in the World War I in 1914, when Alfred von Schlieffen personally oversees the implementation of his plan for a two-front war. It occupies Belgium and France after the war. Two years later, Germany helps Russia put down a communist revolution in 1916.
2002	The Years of Rice and Salt	Kim Stanley Robinson	The Black Death of the 14th century kills 99 percent of the people in Europe and over the next seven centuries, India, China and the Islamic world come to dominate the planet.
2003	Fox at the Front	Douglas Niles and Michael Dobson	A sequel to Fox on the Rhine, taking place immediately after it. Rommel and George Patton work together to get the Allies to Berlin ahead of the Soviets.
2003	Cold War Hot: Alternate Decisions of the Cold War	Peter G. Tsouras	A collection of alternate history scenarios in the Cold War.
2003	Collaborator	Murray Davies	Set in a Nazi-occupied Great Britain centering on a former prisoner of war and life in occupied Britain.
2003	Conquistador	S. M. Stirling	An inter-dimensional gateway is discovered in California, which gives access to an alternate Earth in which the empire of Alexander the Great flourishes, and where Europeans never discovered America.
2003	In the Presence of Mine Enemies	Harry Turtledove	A family of secret Jews hide in Berlin two or three generations after a Nazi victory in World War II.
2003	Roma Eterna	Robert Silverberg	The Red Sea does not part before Moses and, as a result, the Roman Empire grows and prospers without the influence of Christianity.
2004	Airborn	Kenneth Oppel	Airships, rather than airplanes, are used extensively for world travel.
2004	Curious Notions	Harry Turtledove	Central Powers win World War I.
2004	The Plot Against America	Philip Roth	Charles Lindbergh is elected President of the United States in 1940 and collaborates with Nazi Germany.
2005	In High Places	Harry Turtledove	Presents two alternative worlds. In the first one, the Black Death is deadlier, and while the remaining Europeans are able to limit the extent of Muslim colonization, European colonial empires never rise and England remains a backwater. The second is set in a Spain where the Roman Empire fell apart early and as a result is divided between Carthaginian colonies on the coasts and Basque settlements in the interior.
2005	Never Let Me Go	Kazuo Ishiguro	Sterile clones are bred for their organs in what appears to be an alternate version of the 1990s.
2006	1862	Robert Conroy	England enters the American Civil War on the side of the Confederacy due to the RMS Trent incident.
2006	Half Life	Shelley Jackson	The atomic bomb resulted in a genetic preponderance of conjoined twins, who eventually become a minority subculture.
2007	1945	Robert Conroy	The United States invades Japan in World War II despite using the atomic bomb.
2007	Ice	Jacek Dukaj	The First World War never occurs and Poland is still under Russian rule.
2007	Mainspring	Jay Lake	A young clockmaker's apprentice, who is visited by the Archangel Gabriel, is told that he must take the Key Perilous and rewind the Mainspring of the Earth.
2007	Russian Amerika	Stoney Compton	Alaska is still owned by Russia.
2007	The Yiddish Policemen's Union	Michael Chabon	During World War II, a temporary Yiddish-speaking settlement for Jewish refugees was established in Alaska in 1941.
2007	Macarthur's War	Douglas Niles and Michael Dobson	The US defeat in Midway forces Douglas MacArthur to take over the Allied command in the Pacific and later launch the invasion of Japan. Isoroku Yamamoto also serves as Japan's war minister.
2008	The Execution Channel	Ken MacLeod	Al Gore is elected president in 2000 and the 9/11 attacks involved different targets.
2008	The Man with the Iron Heart	Harry Turtledove	A German insurgency at the end of World War II occurs.
2008	Without Warning	John Birmingham	On the eve of the Iraq War in March 2003, an energy field appears in North America, wiping out all human and animal life within it.
2009	1942	Robert Conroy	A third wave of airstrikes on Pearl Harbor forces the American fleet to abandon the base, opening up the Hawaiian islands to Japanese invasion.
2009	The Infinities	John Banville	In one of an infinite number of universes, Mary, Queen of Scots, executed her cousin Elizabeth, England is a Catholic nation, Sweden is bellicose, Wallace's theory of evolution has been discredited, and cold fusion is the principal source of energy.
2009	The Age of Ra	James Lovegrove	The Ancient Egyptian gods have defeated all other pantheons and now rule over the world.
=== 2010s ===
2010	After America	John Birmingham	Sequel to Without Warning.
2010	Red Inferno: 1945	Robert Conroy	The Allied advance on Berlin causes a paranoid Stalin to attack the American troops, forcing the Allies and a semi-rehabilitated Germany to work together to fight off the Soviet threat.
2011	The Afrika Reich	Guy Saville	The British are defeated at the Battle of Dunkirk, allowing the Nazis to conquer Europe and then Africa.
2011	Osama	Lavie Tidhar	Set in an alternate world where Osama bin Laden is a fictional character in a pulp detective novel.
2011	Castro's Bomb	Robert Conroy	Fidel Castro seizes control of Soviet nuclear bombs during the Cuban Missile Crisis.
2011	11/22/63	Stephen King	A time traveler stops John F. Kennedy's assassination only to create an even worse late 20th century for America.
2012	Age of Aztec	James Lovegrove	The Aztec Empire conquers the globe, beginning with the defeat of Hernán Cortés by Montezuma II.
2012	Dominion	C. J. Sansom	Lord Halifax, rather than Winston Churchill, takes over the war effort in 1940, surrendering Britain to be a satellite state of Nazi Germany.
2012	Faultline 49	David M. Danson (pseudonym of Joe MacKinnon)	Reporter David Danson travels through U.S.-occupied Canada in search of the principal provocateur in the Canadian-American War (a conflict instigated by 11 September 2001 World Trade Center bombing in Edmonton, Alberta).
2012	Himmler's War	Robert Conroy	Hitler is killed by a random Allied bombing in 1944, allowing Heinrich Himmler to become the leader of Germany and push new advances on the Allies.
2012	The Impeachment of Abraham Lincoln	Stephen L. Carter	Abraham Lincoln survives his assassination attempt and, two years later, faces an impeachment trial.
2012	The Mirage	Matt Ruff	Christian fundamentalists hijack airplanes and fly them into buildings in Iraq and Saudi Arabia, and the United Arab States declares a War on Terror and invades the U.S.
2012	Rising Sun	Robert Conroy	The Battle of Midway is a defeat for the U.S. Navy, paving the way for Japan to attack the West Coast of the United States.
2012	Pact Ribbentrop - Beck	Piotr Zychowicz	Hitler makes a pact with Poland rather than invading it, so after conquering Western Europe the Poles join him in his 1941 attack on the Soviet Union and defeat it together, dividing its territory.
2012	North Reich	Robert Conroy	Britain surrenders to Nazi Germany and has a fascist regime installed across the Commonwealth and Empire, with Canada becoming a base from which Germany prepares to launch a war against the United States.
2013	Fallout	Todd Strasser	The Cuban Missile Crisis leads to World War III. Twelve-year-old Scott and his family must squeeze into a small fallout shelter with six uninvited neighbors and somehow survive without enough food or water for the next two weeks.
2014	Unholy Land	Lavie Tidhar	In this world the Uganda Scheme succeeded in the early 20th century, and the Jewish state is in Uganda, called Palestina, with Arafat City as its capital. By the book's present day tensions are rising, with Palestina putting up walls to keep out African refugees
2016	Underground Airlines	Ben Winters	The American Civil War never happens, with the Crittenden Compromise being adopted instead, and slavery remains legal in the Hard Four states of Alabama, Louisiana, Mississippi, and a united Carolina.
2016	Everfair	Nisi Shawl	African-American missionaries join forces with Africans, East Asians, Europeans, and socialists from the British Fabian Society to buy the Congo Free State from Leopold II of Belgium. Freeing it from becoming a site of colonial atrocities, they rename it 'Everfair', and make it a safe haven for the people of the Congo, former slaves returning from America, and other places where African natives and their descendants are being mistreated.
2017	River of Teeth	Sarah Gailey	As one of his last acts of his presidency in early 1861, President James Buchanan approved the Hippo Act, a plan to import hippopotamuses into the United States as livestock. Decades later, the lawless swamps of Louisiana are infested with murderous feral hippos.
2017	The Underground Railroad	Colson Whitehead	The Underground Railroad was a literal railroad, and not just a metaphor.
2017	Jak zawsze	Zygmunt Miłoszewski	In 1963, instead of communists, Poland is ruled by a social democratic-peasant alliance led by President Eugeniusz Kwiatkowski, and the country stands under the strong influence of France.
2017	The Berlin Project	Gregory Benford	During World War II the American atomic program completes the atomic bomb a year earlier than in reality, enabling it to be deployed against Germany and bring about a premature end to the war.
2018	My Real Children	Jo Walton	Presents a world where the protagonist has two, mutually incompatible memories of history. In one world Kennedy is assassinated by a bomb in 1963, which leads to accelerated nuclear disarmament. The Soviet Union liberalises sooner and does not crush the Hungarian and Czechoslovak revolution. The Soviet Union also reaches the moon first in 1967, and the United States is struggling to catch up to develop its own space and moonbase technology. In another timeline, the Cuban Missile Crisis escalates into full-scale nuclear war, and Miami, Kyiv, Delhi, Tel Aviv and various unspecified Chinese cities are destroyed over the process of 50 years, creating a world where anaplastic thyroid cancer is common. The United States becomes isolationist, not getting involved in Vietnam, the EU consolidates much earlier and decolonisation does not occur as swiftly.
2018	A Man Lies Dreaming	Lavie Tidhar	Using a story-within-a-story narrative, it recounts a Jewish man in Auschwitz imagining an alternate history. In this alternate history, the Nazis failed to take power in 1933, with communists taking power and purging the high ranking Nazi leadership. Hitler, called 'Wolf' in the novel, fled to England, which became fascist, and now works as a private detective for hire.
2018	Through Darkest Europe	Harry Turtledove	Alternate medieval philosophies in both Christianity and Islam lead to a modern world where Islamic countries are the richest and most developed in the world, while European Christian countries are backward and violent.
2018	The Only Harmless Great Thing	Brooke Bolander	Sign language communication with elephants became possible in the 1880s, but they were still considered animals for several decades more. US Radium purchased several (including Topsy the Elephant) to replace their litigious human employees from the Radium Girls scandal, because elephants can tolerate higher doses of radiation. Decades in the future, a scientist tries to persuade the elephant community to allow themselves to become long-term nuclear waste warning messages.
2018	The Atlantropa Articles	Cody Franklin	World War II never takes place and Germany completes Herman Sörgel's Atlantropa plan. The novel occurs thousands of years in the future and the Mediterranean Sea is a deadly wasteland.
2018	Summerland	Hannu Rajaniemi	In 1938 humanity discovers a realm to the afterlife called 'Summerland', a metropolis for the recently deceased, and the British Empire and the Soviet Union are vying for control over it.
2019	Machines Like Me	Ian McEwan	Alan Turing lived well past WW2, and technology overall is more advanced than in our time, so by the time of the 80s the Internet, social media, and self-driving cars already exist. Robots are available to a select rich few. Thatcher lost the Falklands War and is battling Tony Benn in UK politics.
2019	Red, White & Royal Blue	Casey McQuiston	Set in 2020 in a world where Donald Trump lost the 2016 United States presidential election. The novel can be considered "soft" alternate history, as it focuses more on romantic comedy than on the consequences of the stated divergence.
2019	Civilisations	Laurent Binet	The Vikings in c.1000 ad, travel to the Americas and make contact with native American peoples, specifically the Incas and the Aztecs, sharing cultural ideas with them and iron smelting techniques, but cause a pandemic by bringing diseases from Europe with them. This, however, leads to Native Americans gaining immunity to European diseases, so are in a stronger position against European colonisation. Christopher Columbus is kidnapped and his men killed, and the Americas remain unconquered. In 1531 the Incas invade Europe.
2019	This Is How You Lose the Time War	Amal El-Mohtar and Max Gladstone	Book features two agents from two warring factions (called 'Red' and 'Blue'), who traverse multiple different timelines in a form of time war. One timeline they encounter features a world where the Aztecs were not colonised, multiple worlds where Atlantis exists and falls, and one where the Earth was destroyed in a nuclear holocaust.
=== 2020s ===
2020	The Once and Future Witches	Alix E. Harrow	Witches exist, and in New Salem in 1893 witches join the Suffragette movement. Witchcraft exists in this world and is somewhat accepted, but witches are fighting for the right to practice witchcraft openly and more boldly.
2020	Ring Shout; or, Hunting Ku Kluxes in the End Times	P. Djeli Clark	Set in an alternate historical world of Macon, Georgia in 1922, the story is told from the perspective of Maryse Boudreaux. At this time, Prohibition is occurring and the town of Macon is known for having Ku Klux Klan marches with many white men, women, and children. Before the beginning of the story, the Second Klan came to be on 25 November 1915, on the day the trio refers to as "D-Day" or "Devil's Night", when an old witch summoned the "Ku Kluxes" at the Stone Mountain in Atlanta. Despite the efforts of formerly enslaved persons such as Robert Smalls to disband the first Klan, they were not able to wipe out the monsters that feed off the hatred and killing of innocent African-Americans in the United States. Due to the release of The Birth of a Nation, a product of dark magic, many white people were swayed into believing the narrative of the Ku Klux Klan as saviors and African-Americans as evil.
2020	Elatsoe	Darcie Little Badger	Magic exists in America, and the magic, monsters, knowledge, and legends of all its peoples, native or not, exist. Magic includes the ability to make an orb of light appear or travel across the world through rings of fungi. Elatsoe, the protagonist, practises magic from her native Lipan Apache family, and can raise the ghosts of dead animals.
2020	Rodham	Curtis Sittenfeld	Hillary Clinton never married Bill Clinton, and instead pursues a career in law. In 2015 she runs successfully for president with endorsements from Donald Trump.
2020	Agency	William Gibson	In an alternate 2017 Brexit did not happen and Hillary Clinton is president, and Turkey and Syria are at the brink of war. Experimental military AI technology is created that allows people to use as proxies and enter alternate timelines where apocalyptic events did not happen
2020	The Oppenheimer Alternative	Robert J. Sawyer	After J. Robert Oppenheimer heads the Manhattan Project and the development of the atomic bomb, he directs a secret project to save humanity after it is discovered that the Sun's core is unstable and will shed its outer layer in the late-2020s, engulfing the inner Solar System, including Earth.
2021	Outlawed	Anna North	The United States experienced a devastating flu pandemic in the 1830s. Among other implications, this pandemic resulted in strict fertility laws, and gender nonconformist women rebels hold out in the Hole-in-the-Wall as outlaws in the American frontier.
2021	The Kingdoms	Natasha Pulley	Napoleon won the Battle of Trafalgar, and, the English were enslaved.
2022	All the White Spaces	Ally Wilkes	A 1920 British expedition to Antarctica takes place in an alternate history to the one in which Ernest Shackleton and others explored the continent.
2022	To Paradise	Hanya Yanagihara	In an alternate 1893 America, New York is part of the Free States, where same sex marriage is legal and normalised.
2023	Babel, or the Necessity of Violence: An Arcane History of the Oxford Translator's Revolution	R.F. Kuang	In an alternate Oxford set in the Victorian Age, the British Empire is established and maintained through the magical use of silver, which when engraved with certain words release magical powers. The magical power specifically comes from when two etymologically linked pair of words from both English and another language are matched.
2023	Cahokia Jazz	Francis Spufford	The variant of smallpox that arrived with European settlers was variola minor, both dramatically less fatal than variola major and conferring immunity on those who contracted it. Far from the Indigenous peoples in North America from being almost entirely wiped out, there is instead a huge and thriving Native American population in the US in 1922 located in the fictional state of Deseret.

== Novel series ==
Title	Author	Description	Installments
Paratime series	H. Beam Piper and John F. Carr	Consists of several short stories, one novella, and one novel. The series deals with an advanced civilization that is able to travel between parallel universes with alternate histories, and uses that ability to trade for goods and services that its own, exhausted Earth cannot provide. The protagonists of the stories are the Paratime Police, the organization that protects the secret of paratime travel.	"He Walked Around the Horses" (April 1948); Police Operation (July 1948); Last Enemy (August 1950); Temple Trouble (April 1951); Genesis (September 1951); Time Crime (novella) (February and March 1955); Lord Kalvan of Otherwhen (novel) (1965) in two parts: "Gunpowder God" and "Down Styphon!"; Sequels not written by Piper and mainly written by John F. Carr: Great Kings' War (1985) with Roland J. Green; Kalvan Kingmaker (2000); The Siege of Tarr-Hostigos (2003); The Fireseed Wars (2009); The Hos-Blethan Affair (2014) with Wolfgang Diehr; The Gunpowder God (2016)
Crosstime series	Andre Norton	The story takes its protagonist through several versions of Earth as it might have been if history had gone differently.	The Crossroads of Time (1956): Features a world in which Nazi Germany won the Battle of Britain, Operation Sea Lion went ahead in May 1940 and the Axis subsequently launched an invasion of the United States. As a consequence of this sequence of events, civilization has collapsed and New York has been bombed into ruins.; Quest Crosstime (1965): Features a world where Richard III won the Battle of Bosworth in 1485 and Cortez and Pizarro failed to subdue the Mesoamerican civilizations in the New World. In its twentieth century, the postcolonial Nation of New Britain and the Toltec Empire are engaged in cold war with each other across the Mississippi River.
Imperium series	Keith Laumer	Series featuring a continuum of parallel worlds policed by the Imperium, formed in an alternate history where the American Revolution did not occur, and the British Empire and Germany merged into a unified empire in 1900, with a government based in an alternate Stockholm. American diplomat Brion Bayard is the protagonist, having been kidnapped by the Imperium because the Brion Bayard in a third parallel Earth is apparently waging war against the Imperium. Further adventures follow after Bayard decides to remain in the service of the Imperium. Includes three novels and two omnibus collections (Beyond the Imperium (1981) and Imperium (2005))	Worlds of the Imperium (1962); The Other Side of Time (1965); Assignment in Nowhere (1968); Zone Yellow (1990)
Lord Darcy	Randall Garrett	A number of short stories and one novel (Too Many Magicians) based on the premise that King Richard I of England returned safely from France and that Roger Bacon had codified the laws of magic.	Too Many Magicians (1967); Murder and Magic (1979); Lord Darcy Investigates (1981); Ten Little Wizards (1988); A Study in Sorcery (1989); Lord Darcy (2002)
A Nomad of the Time Streams	Michael Moorcock	A series of novels featuring a grown-up version of E. Nesbit's Oswald Bastable (from The Story of the Treasure Seekers and other books) who experiences a variety of alternate realities that have diverged from his own timeline.	Warlord of the Air (1971); The Land Leviathan (1974); The Steel Tsar (1977)
Operation Otherworld	Poul Anderson	The existence of God has been scientifically proven and magic has been harnessed for the practical needs of the adept by the degaussing of cold iron, while the United States is part of an alternate Second World War against the Islamic Khalifate, which has invaded the United States.	Operation Chaos (1971); Operation Luna (2000)
North American Confederacy series	L. Neil Smith	A single word in the Declaration of Independence differs and Albert Gallatin joins the Whiskey Rebellion in 1794 to the benefit of the farmers, rather than the fledgling United States government. This results in the rebellion to become a Second American Revolution. This eventually leads to George Washington being overthrown and executed by firing squad for treason, Gallatin being declared the second president, the U.S. Constitution being declared null and void, and a revised version of the Articles of Confederation being ratified, but with a much greater emphasis on individual and economic freedom. These actions eventually lead to the US merging with its neighbors as the North American Confederacy, a libertarian society in the 1890s.	The Probability Broach (1979); The Venus Belt (1980); Their Majesties' Bucketeers (1981); The Nagasaki Vector (1983); Tom Paine Maru (1984); The Gallatin Divergence (1985); Brightsuit MacBear (1988); Taflak Lysandra (1989); The American Zone (2001)
Fireball trilogy	John Christopher	Two cousins are transported into an alternate history Earth through a mysterious fireball where the Roman Empire never fell.	Fireball (1981); New Found Land (1983); Dragon Dance (1986)
The Dark Tower	Stephen King	Although this is primarily a fantasy and time travel series with elements of steampunk, there are interludes of alternate history. For example, in one scene, the characters enter a world where Spiro Agnew became the 38th US president, in another they visit a world where Gary Hart was president in the 1980s and Ronald Reagan never entered politics.	The Dark Tower: The Gunslinger (1982); The Dark Tower II: The Drawing of the Three (1987); The Dark Tower III: The Waste Lands (1991); The Dark Tower IV: Wizard and Glass (1997); The Dark Tower: The Wind Through the Keyhole (2012); The Dark Tower V: Wolves of the Calla (2003); The Dark Tower VI: Song of Susannah (2004); The Dark Tower VII: The Dark Tower (2004)
Eden trilogy	Harry Harrison	The K–T extinction never happens. Mammals evolve into human-like creatures who are a persecuted minority in a world ruled by bipedal reptilians.	West of Eden (1984); Winter in Eden (1986); Return to Eden (1988)
Germanicus trilogy	Kirk Mitchell	Rome never fell, after Pontius Pilate pardons Joshua bar-Joseph (Christ), and the Romans win a decisive victory at Teutoberg Forest and Latinize Greater Germania.	Procurator (1984); The New Barbarians (1986); Cry Republic (1989); Gray Tide in the East by Andrew J. Heller; Gray Tide in the East; Tidal Effects
The Tales of Alvin Maker	Orson Scott Card	A North America where people wield magic, or knacks, and the revolution was only partly successful.	Seventh Son (1987); Red Prophet (1988); Prentice Alvin (1989); Alvin Journeyman (1995); Heartfire (1998); The Crystal City (2003); Master Alvin (TBA)
The Hammer and the Cross series	Harry Harrison	Vikings rebel against the harsh rule of the Catholic Church.	The Hammer and the Cross (1993); One King's Way (1995); King and Emperor (1997)
The Domination	S. M. Stirling	The early entry of the Netherlands on the American side of the American Revolution causes them to lose the Cape Colony to Britain, which renames it the Crown Colony of Drakia after Sir Francis Drake and settles Loyalists and Hessians there, who absorb the Boers to set up a slavery-based empire called the Domination of the Draka.	Marching Through Georgia (1988); Under the Yoke (1989); The Stone Dogs (1990); Drakon (1995); Drakas! (2000)
Anno Dracula series	Kim Newman	The heroes of Bram Stoker's 1897 novel Dracula fail to stop Count Dracula's conquest of Great Britain, resulting in a world where vampires are common and increasingly dominant in society.	Anno Dracula (1992); The Bloody Red Baron (1995); Dracula Cha Cha Cha aka. Judgment of Tears (1998); Johnny Alucard (TBA)
Worldwar and Colonization series	Harry Turtledove	Aliens with a feudal caste system and 1990s style technology calling themselves the "Race" invade Earth in the middle of World War II, forcing the Allied and Axis Forces to put aside their differences and battle this new threat.	Worldwar Tetralogy; In the Balance (1994); Tilting the Balance (1995); Upsetting the Balance (1996); Striking the Balance (1996); Colonization trilogy; Second Contact (1999); Down to Earth (2000); Aftershocks (2001); Homeward Bound (2004)
The Southern Victory series	Harry Turtledove	The South won the American Civil War in 1862 due to not losing the copy of Special Order 191, resulting in the US and CSA continuing to exist and battling through this timeline's versions of the Franco-Prussian War, the First World War and the Second World War.	How Few Remain (1997); The Great War Trilogy; American Front (1998); Walk in Hell (1999); Breakthroughs (2000); The American Empire Trilogy; Blood and Iron (2001); The Center Cannot Hold (2002); The Victorious Opposition (2003); The Settling Accounts Tetralogy; Return Engagement (2004); Drive to the East (2005); The Grapple (2006); In at the Death (2007)
Stars and Stripes trilogy	Harry Harrison	Prince Albert dies prematurely and Britain becomes involved in the American Civil War.	Stars and Stripes Forever (1998); Stars and Stripes in Peril (2000); Stars and Stripes Triumphant (2002)
Belisarius	David Drake and Eric Flint	Opposing factions from the future influence early times through intermediaries for their own purposes: the "good" side operating through the Byzantine general Belisarius and the "evil" side operating through the Indian state of Malwa.	An Oblique Approach (1998); In the Heart of Darkness (1998); Destiny's Shield (1999); Fortune's Stroke (2000); The Tide of Victory (2001); The Dance of Time (2006)
The Age of Unreason	Gregory Keyes	Alchemy really works thanks to Isaac Newton.	Newton's Cannon (1998); A Calculus of Angels (1999); Empire of Unreason (2000); The Shadows of God (2001)
Nantucket series	S. M. Stirling	The island of Nantucket is sent back in time to the Bronze Age circa 1250 BC.	Island in the Sea of Time (1998); Against the Tide of Years (1999); On the Oceans of Eternity (2000)
1632 series	Eric Flint	An entire modern West Virginia town is transported in time and space to Germany during the Thirty Years' War.	1632 (2000); 1633 (2002); 1634: The Galileo Affair (2004); 1634: The Ram Rebellion (2006); 1635: The Cannon Law (2006); 1634: The Baltic War (2007); 1634: The Bavarian Crisis (2007); The Anaconda Project (2008–); 1635: The Dreeson Incident (2008); 1635: The Eastern Front (2010); 1636: The Saxon Uprising (2011); 1636: The Kremlin Games (2012); 1635: The Papal Stakes (2012); The Danish Scheme (2013); 1636: The Devil's Opera (2013); 1636: Commander Cantrell in the West Indies (2014); 1636: The Viennese Waltz (2014); 1636: The Cardinal Virtues 2015; 1635: A Parcel of Rogues (2016); 1635: The Wars for the Rhine (2016); 1636: The Ottoman Onslaught (2017); 1636: Mission to the Mughals (2017); 1636: The Vatican Sanction (2017); 1637: The Volga Rules (2018); 1637: The Polish Maelstrom (2019); 1636: The China Venture (2019); 1636: The Atlantic Encounter (2020); 1637: No Peace Beyond the Line (2020)
Arabesk trilogy	Jon Courtenay Grimwood	Woodrow Wilson brokered an earlier peace to World War I so that it never expanded outside of the Balkans. The books are set in a liberal Islamic Ottoman North Africa in the 21st century, mainly centring on Alexandria, referred to as El Iskandriyah.	Pashazade (2001); Effendi (2002); Felaheen (2003)
Elemental Masters	Mercedes Lackey	An alternate Edwardian Earth is home to magicians who have control over the four elements.	The Serpent's Shadow (2001); The Gates of Sleep (2002); Phoenix and Ashes (2004); The Wizard of London (2005); Reserved for the Cat (2007); Unnatural Issue (2011); Home From the Sea (2012); Elemental Magic (2012); Steadfast (2013); Elementary (2013); Blood Red (2014); From A High Tower (2015); A Study in Sable (2016); A Scandal in Battersea (2017); The Bartered Brides (2018)
The Neanderthal Parallax series	Robert J. Sawyer	A Neanderthal visitor from a parallel world where Homo sapiens became extinct and Neanderthals became the dominant species arrives on our world. The Neanderthal society is sexually segregated, with men and women interacting for only a few days each month, and reproduction being consciously limited to ten-year intervals.	Hominids (2002); Humans (2003); Hybrids (2003)
Hannibal series	John Maddox Roberts	The Carthaginians won the Second Punic War against the Romans.	Hannibal's Children (2002); The Seven Hills (2005)
Heirs of Alexandria series	Mercedes Lackey, Eric Flint and Dave Freer	Set in a renaissance Europe where the Library of Alexandria was not destroyed by a Christian mob and the now sainted Hypatia of Alexandria and John Chrysostom shaped religious thought, significantly altering how the Church developed.	The Shadow of the Lion (2002); This Rough Magic (2003); A Mankind Witch (2005)
Civil War series	Newt Gingrich and William R. Forstchen	Robert E. Lee wins the Battle of Gettysburg.	Gettysburg: A Novel of the Civil War (2003); Grant Comes East (2004); Never Call Retreat: Lee and Grant: The Final Victory (2005)
Crosstime Traffic	Harry Turtledove	Travel between parallel universes is possible.	Gunpowder Empire (2003) – A world where the Roman Empire never fell and has technology equal to that of the age of Napoleon.; Curious Notions (2004) – The Central Powers of WW1 won prior to American entry into the conflict and conquered the isolationist USA in the 1950s.; In High Places (2006) – The Black Death was far more virulent across Europe, leading to a world dominated by Muslims.; The Disunited States of America (2006) – The USA was unable to agree to a full constitution following victory in the War of Independence, leading to every state becoming a different country by the early 1800s.; The Gladiator (2007) – The Soviet Union was able to win the Cold War and remake the entire world in their image.; The Valley-Westside War (2008) – Nuclear War in 1967 lead to the collapse of society.
Days of Infamy series	Harry Turtledove	Japan's attack on Pearl Harbor extends to occupying all of Hawaii	Days of Infamy (2004); End of the Beginning (2005)
Insh'Allah series	Steven Barnes	Shows an alternate world in which Carthage destroyed Rome, with Europe remaining tribal and an Islamic-dominated Africa colonizing the New World.	Lion's Blood (2002); Zulu Heart (2003)
The Merchant Princes series	Charles Stross	Series of nine novels. In the series, there exists a number of parallel worlds all of which are on the same geographical Earth, but with different societies at different points of development. Members of a certain bloodline can travel between these worlds along with their immediate possessions.	The Family Trade (2004); The Hidden Family (2005); The Clan Corporate (2006); The Merchants' War (2007); The Revolution Business (2009); The Trade of Queens (2010); Empire Games (2017); Dark State (2018); Invisible Sun (2021)
Axis of Time series	John Birmingham	An American-led UN Multinational Force arrives uptime from 2021 via a wormhole that was accidentally generated as a byproduct of a scientific experiment to the year 1942.	Weapons of Choice (2004); Designated Targets (2005); Final Impact (2007)
The Emberverse series	S. M. Stirling	An event called "The Change" in 1998 causes electricity, guns, explosives, internal combustion engines and steam power to stop working.	Dies the Fire (2004); The Protector's War (2005); A Meeting at Corvallis (2006); The Sunrise Lands (2007); The Scourge of God (2008); The Sword of the Lady (2009); The High King of Montival (2010); Tears of the Sun (2011); Lord of Mountains (2012); The Given Sacrifice (2013); The Golden Princess (2014); The Desert and the Blade (2015); Prince of Outcasts (2016); The Sea Peoples (2017); The Sky-Blue Wolves (2018)
The Sky Crawlers	Hiroshi Mori	Follows the journeys and tribulations of a group of young fighter pilots involved in dogfight warfare, and is set during an alternate historical period.	None But Air (2004); Down to Heaven (2005); Flutter into Life (2006); Cradle the Sky (2007); The Sky Crawlers (2001); Sky Eclipse (TBA)
Romanitas Trilogy	Sophia McDougall	The Roman Empire survived to contemporary times.	Romanitas (2005); Rome Burning (2007); Savage City (2010)
Trail of Glory series	Eric Flint	Sam Houston was not injured at the beginning of the War of 1812, and substantially revises the history of the Trail of Tears.	1812: Rivers of War (2005); 1824: The Arkansas War (2006)
The Lords of Creation	S. M. Stirling	An ancient alien civilization makes Mars and Venus habitable and seeds them with Earth life.	The Sky People (2006); In the Courts of the Crimson Kings (2008); The Lords of Creation (2025)
Temeraire	Naomi Novik	The Napoleonic Wars are fought with an Air Force of dragons.	His Majesty's Dragon (2006); Throne of Jade (2006); Black Powder War (2006); Empire of Ivory (2007); Victory of Eagles (2008); Tongues of Serpents (2010); Crucible of Gold (2012); Blood of Tyrants (2013); League of Dragons (Forthcoming, 2015)
The Small Change trilogy	Jo Walton	The United Kingdom made peace with Nazi Germany (against Winston Churchill's wishes).	Farthing (2006); Ha'penny (2007); Half a Crown (2008)
Pacific War series	Newt Gingrich and William R. Forstchen	Alternate Pacific War.	Pearl Harbor: A Novel of 8 December (2007); Days of Infamy (2008)
Destroyermen series	Taylor Anderson	In the midst of World War II, an old battered four stacker and its Japanese enemy is swept through a storm and finds itself on a version of Earth where humans had never evolved.	Into the Storm (2008); Crusade (2008); Maelstrom (2009); Distant Thunder (2010); Rising Tides (2011); Firestorm (2011); Iron Gray Sea (2012); Storm Surge (2013); Deadly Shores (2014); Straits of Hell (2015); Blood in the Water (2016); Devil's Due (2017); River of Bones (2018); Pass of Fire (2019); Winds of Wrath (2020)
Leviathan Trilogy	Scott Westerfeld		Leviathan (2009); Behemoth (2010); Goliath (2011)
The Pantheon series	James Lovegrove	Alternate Earths where the gods of ancient myth and legend are real and play an active role in human affairs.	The Age of Ra (2009); The Age of Zeus (2010); The Age of Odin (2011); The Age of Aztec (2012); The Age of Voodoo (2013); The Age of Godpunk (2013); The Age of Shiva (2014); The Age of Heroes (2016); The Age of Legends (2019); The Age of Anansi (2012)
TimeRiders	Alex Scarrow	Three people who have been rescued moments before death are recruited into a secret agency to prevent time travel from unraveling history.	TimeRiders (2010); TimeRiders: Day of the Predator (2010); TimeRiders: The Doomsday Code (2011); TimeRiders: The Eternal War (2011); TimeRiders: Gates of Rome (2012); TimeRiders: City of Shadows (2013); TimeRiders: The Pirate Kings (2013); TimeRiders: The Mayan Prophecy (2013); TimeRiders: The Infinity Cage (2014)
The Hot War series	Harry Turtledove	In response to Chinese intervention in the Korean War, President Harry S. Truman orders the use of atomic weapons against Manchuria in 1951 leading to a full-scale nuclear war between NATO and the Warsaw Pact.	Bombs Away (2015); Fallout (2016); Armistice (2017)
Noughts and Crosses series	Malorie Blackman	In an alternative history, Africa became a unified empire and invaded, occupied and colonised Europe instead of Europe colonising Africa. At the time of the series, slavery had been abolished for some time, but segregation, similar to the Jim Crow Laws, continues to operate to keep the "Crosses" (dark-skinned people) in control of the "noughts" (lighter-skinned people). An international organisation, the Pangaean Economic Community, exists. Seeming to be similar to the United Nations in scope but similar to the European Union in powers, it is playing a role in forcing change by directives and boycotts.	Noughts and Crosses (2001); An Eye For an Eye (2003); Knife Edge (2004); Checkmate (2005); Double Cross (2008); Crossfire (2019); Nought Forever (2019); Endgame (2021); Callum (2012)
His Dark Materials	Philip Pullman	The series features the multiverse, and characters cross between different worlds. Lyra Belacqua, the series' protagonist, comes from an alternate Earth where John Calvin, instead of forming a new breakaway church, instead became the Pope, moved the Church to Geneva, and so by the time of the first book the Church (named "the Magisterium") is far more dominant, aggressive and interferes in society's affairs. Much of the dress code and social mores are still from the 18th century (women are not allowed to teach at Oxford University), cars and fixed-winged aircraft, but zeppelins are a common and dominant mode of transport. There are six known planets in this world and the month of April has an extra day. Magical aspects exist as the underpinning quantum reality of Lyra's universe, and other species, such as Witches and talking, intelligent armoured bears (called panserbjørne) co-exist with Humans. Other worlds include that of the world of Cittàgazze, which serves as the crossroads to the worlds because all the windows lead here. Other worlds include that of a world where elephant-like creatures evolved a distinct anatomy based on a diamond-framed skeleton without a spine, and one where Humans aligned with the Majesterium are engaged in a genocidal war with the Gallivespians.	Northern Lights (1995); The Subtle Knife (1997); The Amber Spyglass (2000); Lyra's Oxford (2003); Once Upon a Time in the North (2008); The Collectors (2014); La Belle Sauvage (2017); The Secret Commonwealth (2019); Serpentine (2020); The Imagination Chamber (2022)
Take Them to the Stars	Sylvain Neuvel	A mysterious society of powerful women manipulate history to save humanity, and ultimately get them into space.	A History of What Comes Next (2021); Until the Last of Me (2022); For the First Time, Again (2023)
Altered State	J. G. Jenkinson	An East German scientist tries to help Germany win WWI by sending documents to 1913. His grandfather, a soldier in the Kaiser's army, experiences the new war, and the scientist's future paramour from the 21st century he creates travels back to stop him.	The Berlin Principle (2022); The London Reaction (2023); The Sarajevo Hypothesis (2023)
The Apollo Murders	Chris Hadfield	Set in an alternate 1973 and 1975 during the Cold War, and features an Apollo 18 mission to the Moon, and the American-Soviet Apollo–Soyuz space mission.	The Apollo Murders (2021); The Defector (2023); Final Orbit (2025)
Artillerymen series	Taylor Anderson	In 1847 an American force en route to Veracruz as part of the Mexican-American War is transported to the alternate world of Anderson's Destroyermen series.	Purgatory's Shore (2021); Hell's March (2022); Devil's Battle (2023); Inferno's Shadow (2025)
Moscow 2160	Kumo Kagyu	The USSR landed a man on the moon before the USA on 24 October 1970, winning the Space Race. As a result, the Soviet Union never collapsed and continues to exist into the year 2160, with the Cold War never ending. The series has also been adapted into a manga.	Moscow 2160, Volume 1 (2023)
Make the Darkness Light series	S. M. Stirling	At the very beginning of World War III, just as the first bombs begin to fall, a small party of Americans is sent back to second-century Pannonia (Austria) to try to change history so that the world becomes a more peaceful place, and WW III is prevented. At the same time, a rival group is sent back to the second century to change history and make China the sole world power in the 21st century.	To Turn the Tide (2024); The Winds of Fate (2025)

== Anthologies ==
Year	Title	Editor(s)
1932	If It Had Happened Otherwise	J. C. Squire
1989	Alternate Empires	Gregory Benford and Martin H. Greenberg
1989	Alternate Heroes	Gregory Benford and Martin H. Greenberg
1991	Alternate Wars	Gregory Benford and Martin H. Greenberg
1992	Alternate Americas	Gregory Benford and Martin H. Greenberg
1992	Alternate Presidents	Mike Resnick
1992	Alternate Kennedys	Mike Resnick
1993	Alternate Warriors	Mike Resnick
1994	Alternate Outlaws	Mike Resnick
1996	War of the Worlds: Global Dispatches	Kevin J. Anderson
1997	Alternate Tyrants	Mike Resnick
1998	Alternate Generals	Harry Turtledove
1999	What If?	Robert Cowley
2001	What If? 2	Robert Cowley
2001	The Best Alternate History Stories of the 20th Century	Harry Turtledove and Martin H. Greenberg
2003	What Ifs? of American History	Robert Cowley
2006	Futures Past	Jack Dann and Gardner Dozois
2009	Other Earths	Nick Gevers and Jay Lake
2009	Columbia & Britannia	Brian A. Dixon and Adam Chamberlain
2011	Lest Darkness Fall and Related Stories	Alexei Panshin and Cory Panshin

== Short stories and novellas ==
Year	Title	Author	Description
1881	Hands Off	Edward Everett Hale	Joseph is rescued from the slave traders he was sold to, but this benevolent act leads to humanity's extinction centuries later.
1934	Sidewise in Time	Murray Leinster	Sections of the Earth's surface begin changing places with their counterparts in alternate timelines, including one where the South won the Battle of Gettysburg.
1937	The Curfew Tolls	Stephen Vincent Benét	A portrait of Napoleon Bonaparte if he had been born in the 1730s.
1948	He Walked Around the Horses	H. Beam Piper	Diplomat Benjamin Bathurst arrives in a timeline where the British defeated the American rebels.
1952	Sail On! Sail On!	Philip José Farmer	The Earth is flat and Aristotle's axiom that objects of different weights drop with different velocities is true.
1958	Two Dooms	C. M. Kornbluth	The Axis powers win the Second World War.
1960	Delenda Est	Poul Anderson	Renegade time travelers meddle in the outcome of the Second Punic War, bringing about the premature deaths of Publius Cornelius Scipio and Scipio Africanus at the Battle of Ticinus in 218 BC, and thus creating a new timeline in which Hannibal destroys Rome in 210 BC.
1987	The Forest of Time	Michael Flynn	The Thirteen Colonies, after getting independent of Britain, did not succeed in creating the United States but developed into separate and mutually hostile nation-states which often fight bitter wars with each other.
1987	Thor Meets Captain America	David Brin	The Nazis are championed by the Norse Pantheon.
1987	Why I Left Harry's All-Night Hamburgers	Lawrence Watt-Evans	A young man tells his story about growing up working at a greasy spoon diner where travelers from alternate versions of Earth frequently drop in.
1988	The Last Article	Harry Turtledove	A Nazi invasion of India and the brutal reaction of the Germans to the nonviolent resistance and pacifism of Gandhi and his followers.
1991	Red Reign	Kim Newman	The original short story that Anno Dracula is based on.
1997	The Undiscovered	William Sanders	William Shakespeare lives among the Cherokee and tries to produce a version of Hamlet for them.
1998	The Twelfth Album	Stephen Baxter	The Beatles do not split up and produce twelfth album called God.
2000	A Colder War	Charles Stross	The follow-up expedition in H. P. Lovecraft's At the Mountains of Madness has occurred, and inexorably fuses the Cold War and Cthulhu Mythos.
2000	Watching Trees Grow	Peter F. Hamilton	The Roman Empire never fell.
2002	The Daimon	Harry Turtledove	Greek philosopher Socrates aids the Athenian general Alkibiades in defeat the Spartans.
2002	Shikari in Galveston	S. M. Stirling	Novella et in the same world as The Peshawar Lancers, but occurs several years earlier.
2003	The Cuban Missile Crisis: Second Holocaust	Robert L. O'Connell	The 1962 Cuban Missile Crisis developed into war.
2005	The Apotheosis of Martin Padway	S. M. Stirling	A sequel to Lest Darkness Fall by L. Sprague de Camp, continues the story of the American archaeologist transported back to 6th century Rome.
2008	A Murder in Eddsford	S. M. Stirling	A murder mystery set in Post-Change Britain in The Emberverse series.
2008	Something for Yew	S. M. Stirling	Another Rutherston and Bramble mystery.

== Role-playing/board games ==
Year	Title	Description
1988	Sky Galleons of Mars	Set in an alternate Belle Époque where the major nations of Earth are extending their colonial interests on Mars and Venus.
1988	Space: 1889	Set in an alternate Belle Époque where the major nations of Earth are extending their colonial interests on Mars and Venus.
1991	"Reich Star"	Set in 2134 where the Axis powers won World War II.
1993	Forgotten Futures	Settings inspired by Victorian and Edwardian science fiction and fantasy.
1998	Crimson Skies	The United States crumbles into many hostile nation-states following the effects of the Great War, Prohibition, and the Great Depression.
1999	Brave New World	Superhero game set in a fascist United States of America living in a perpetual state of martial law since the 1960s.
1999	GURPS Alternate Earths and GURPS Alternate Earths II	
2001	Godlike: Superhero Roleplaying in a World on Fire, 1936–1946	Set in an alternate history version of World War II where people known as Talents have developed unexplained powers.
2005	GURPS Infinite Worlds	
2008	Gear Krieg	Technological developments during the 1920s (including J. Walter Christie's invention of a bipedal mecha system) leads to a World War II where all major powers are equipped with more advanced military equipment than in reality.

== Comics ==
Year	Title	Author	Description
1986	Captain Confederacy	Will Shetterly and Vince Stone	A superhero is created for propaganda purposes in a world in which the Confederate States of America won their independence.
1986	Watchmen	Alan Moore	The United States has costumed adventurers and the country is edging closer to nuclear warfare with the Soviet Union. The point of divergence comes in the 1930s but does not affect larger history until the 1960s.
1989	Baker Street	Gary Reed and Guy Davis	Features an alternative Sherlock Holmes world where the values and class system of Victorian era England carried over into a late 20th Century where World War II never occurred.
1991	Batman: Holy Terror	Alan Brennert	Set in a world where Oliver Cromwell lived ten years longer than he should have, and America is a commonwealth nation run by a corrupt theocratic government.
1995–ongoing	Astro City	Kurt Busiek et alia	In an early installment, a man travels back in time and prevents the Challenger space shuttle from exploding in 1986, and one of the rescued crew later sires a descendant who will save all mankind from disaster in the future.
1997	Wonder Woman: Amazonia	William Messner-Loebs	In 1888, Queen Victoria and most of her family are murdered by an arsonist. A distant American cousin, "Jack Planters", becomes King and rules the British Empire with a misogynistic atmosphere. In the 1920s, an analog of Wonder Woman leads a popular uprising against King Jack's rule.
1998–2011	Full Metal Panic!	Shoji Gatoh	The series is set in an alternate history, based upon actual world events around the late 20th century to the early 21st century.
2001	Ministry of Space	Warren Ellis	Soldiers and operatives of the United Kingdom reached the German rocket installations at Peenemünde ahead of the U.S. Army and the Soviets, and brought all the key personnel and technology to England.
2002	Scarlet Traces	Ian Edginton	Britain was able to develop alien technology, abandoned after the abortive Martian invasion of The War of the Worlds to establish economic and political dominance over the remainder of the world.
2003	Arrowsmith	Kurt Busiek	The United States is actually the United States of Columbia, magic is real, and the First World War is fought with and by dragons, spells, vampires and all other kinds of magical weapons and beings.
2003	Superman: Red Son	Mark Millar	Superman is raised in the Soviet Union, and his presence upsets the balance of the Cold War.
2003	Shin Konpeki no Kantai (New Deep Blue Fleet)	Yoshio Aramaki	A manga sequel set three years after Konpeki no Kantai. The series depicts World War III between a new republican Japan facing Nazi Germany in a final battle for the fate of the world.
2003	The Life Eaters	David Brin	Comic based on Brin's novella Thor Meets Captain America.
2003	Marvel: 1602 and its sequels	Neil Gaiman	Set Marvel Comics' heroes and villains in the early 17th century due to a Captain America of an alternate dystopian future being transported to the past. Timestream altered to the point of surviving dinosaurs, mostly in America.
2004	Ex Machina	Brian K. Vaughan	Set in a world in which a superhero called the Great Machine becomes mayor of New York after intervening in the September 11 attacks – mitigating the death toll by saving the entire South Tower of the World Trade Center.
2006	General Leonardo	Erik Svane and Dan Greenberg	A French-language graphic novel series in which Leonardo da Vinci manages to build his avant-garde war machines, with the Vatican confiscating them to mount a Crusade to recapture Jerusalem.
2006	Roswell, Texas	L. Neil Smith and Rex F. May	Davy Crockett survived the Alamo and Santa Anna did not, and in which an expanded Texas eventually became the "Federated States of Texas" rather than one of the United States.
2006–2012	The Boys	Garth Ennis and Darick Robertson	In a world where superheroes exist, and the Brooklyn Bridge was destroyed rather than the Twin Towers during 9/11. Most of the superheroes are corrupted by their celebrity status and often engage in reckless behavior, compromising the safety of the world.
2008	Aetheric Mechanics	Warren Ellis	Set in 1907, during a war in the air between Britain and Ruritania.
2008–2011	Chotto Edo Made		Set in a world where the Tokugawa shogunate never ended.
2009	Grandville	Bryan Talbot	Set in a world in which France won the Napoleonic Wars. It also features elements of steampunk and anthropomorphic animals.
2009	Storming Paradise	Chuck Dixon	The first detonation of the atomic bomb at Trinity was exploded prematurely, killing prominent nuclear physicists such as Robert Oppenheimer. This forces the loss of reproducing the atomic bomb and having President Truman to initiate the bloody Allied invasion of Japan in Operation Downfall.
2011	Flashpoint		
2018–ongoing	Chainsaw Man	Tatsuki Fujimoto	The events are set in alternate 1997, in which devils are born out of human fears and Devil Hunters deal with them. The Soviet Union still exists, and many events, such as AIDS, Holocaust and nuclear weapons, have been erased from history due to the consumption of suitable devils by the Chainsaw Devil.
2023	1/6	Alan Jenkins and Gan Golan	The January 6 United States Capitol attack of 2021 was successful and as a direct result, Donald Trump remains President and Trump's former Vice President Mike Pence is hanged during the attack for opposing Trump.
2023–2026	Ultimate Universe	Various	Heavily altered Earth-616 template. Assassination of John F. Kennedy orchestrated by the Maker, along with the dissolution of the federal government of the United States in 1969, all part of the creation of a new world order of continental empires and corporatocracy under the shadow governance of the Maker's Council.

== Films ==
Year	Title	Director	Description
1936	Things to Come	William Cameron Menzies	Earth becomes a dictatorship after a deadly plague wiped out most life following a thirty-year war.
1942	Went the Day Well?	Alberto Cavalcanti	Nazi paratroopers take over an English village and the townspeople lead a resistance against them.
1951	The Magic Face	Frank Tuttle	Hitler is killed by his valet Rudi Janus, who takes his place during World War II.
1966	It Happened Here	Kevin Brownlow and Andrew Mollo	Nazi Germany successfully invades and occupies the United Kingdom during World War II.
1971	Punishment Park	Peter Watkins	During the Vietnam War, President Richard Nixon decrees a state of emergency based on the McCarran Internal Security Act of 1950, which authorizes federal authorities to detain persons judged to be a "risk to internal security", including members of the anti-war, Civil Rights, and feminist movements, as well as conscientious objectors and members of the Communist Party. Detainee's are offered the chance to earn back their freedom by physical trial; fleeing and avoiding National Guard troops in the California Desert for 3 days.
1984	Red Dawn	John Milius	The Soviet Union and communist Latin American nations, invade the United States, starting World War III.
1989	Kiki's Delivery Service	Hayao Miyazaki	According to the director, takes place in a Europe where the World Wars were averted.
1991	Edward II	Derek Jarman	Based on the Marlovian play. In the 1990s, England is ruled by a weak king, who is then deposed in a coup led by a quasi-fascist group.
1991	The Rocketeer	Joe Johnston	It imagines a 1938 where experimental jet packs exist and the Nazis are trying to use them to dominate the world, diverging from known historical events.
1994	Fatherland	Christopher Menaul	Based on the 1992 novel about an Axis victory in World War II.
1995	Richard III	Richard Loncraine	Based on a Shakespeare play, England is ruled by a quasi-fascist regime in the 1930s.
1995	White Man's Burden	Desmond Nakano	Set in an alternate America where African Americans and Caucasian Americans have reversed cultural roles.
1996–ongoing	Independence Day franchise	Roland Emmerich	Earth was attacked in the 1990s by an alien invasion, and society was subsequently rebuilt using tools and knowledge captured from the enemy. The original 1996 film was not alternate history, but the second film Independence Day: Resurgence (2016) and a planned third film are.
1997	Starship Troopers	Paul Verhoeven	The director has stated that this is set centuries after an Axis victory in World War II.
1998	Six-String Samurai	Lance Mungia	The USSR launched several nuclear warheads at the United States in 1957, reducing most of the nation to an inhospitable desert.
1998	World War III	Robert Stone	Gorbachev is overthrown in early October 1989 (with hard-line Communists still firmly in control of almost all of their satellite states), Soviet and East German troops opened fire on demonstrators in Berlin and Leipzig, and the new Soviet regime precipitated a third World War.
2000	Timequest	Robert Dyke	A man travels through time to prevent the assassination of John F. Kennedy.
2001	The One	James Wong	A serial killer targets his own doppelgangers in various alternate universes. We briefly visit a world where Al Gore became the 43rd US president.
2002	2009: Lost Memories	Lee Si-myung	The Korean peninsula is still a part of the Japanese Empire, as Ito Hirobumi was never assassinated, and the Empire of Japan sides with the Allies against Nazi Germany.
2002	Nothing So Strange	Brian Flemming	Covers the assassination of Microsoft chairman Bill Gates on 2 December 1999.
2003	The League of Extraordinary Gentlemen	Stephen Norrington	Based loosely on a comic book of the same name, an espionage thriller set in 1899, in a steampunk world where technology advanced faster than in ours and where several fictional characters from other works of fiction such as Sherlock Holmes and Jekyll and Hyde are real. The point of divergence is not revealed.
2004	C.S.A.: The Confederate States of America	Kevin Willmott	The Confederate States win the American Civil War, annex the United States, and still maintain slavery in the year 2004.
2004	Sky Captain and the World of Tomorrow	Kerry Conran	Set around 1939 in a world more advanced than ours, although the point of divergence is not revealed. World War II does not occur; instead all humanity is held in fear by an army of giant robots created by a reclusive mad scientist.
2004	The Incredibles	Brad Bird	An animated adventure set in a mid 20th century where technology and culture resemble our 2004. This advanced state is implicitly due to the existence of superheroes. The chronology is not emphasized in the plot, but can be gleaned from calendars and newspapers visible at various moments throughout the film.
2004	The Place Promised in Our Early Days	Makoto Shinkai	An anime film by Makoto Shinkai is set in a modern-day Japan that was partitioned after the Pacific War between the Soviet backed Republic of Ezo in Hokkaido and a US allied government in the rest of the Home Islands. The movie also deals with alternate universes.
2007	Pirates of the Caribbean: At the World's End	Jerry Bruckheimer	King George II of Great Britain with the help of Lord Cutler Beckett carries out a coup abolishing the British Constitution causing the British Empire to return to absolutism and persecute pirates and the people associated with them.
2009	Watchmen	Zack Snyder	Film adaptation of the comic book of the same name, Richard Nixon remains President in 1985, years after the USA definitively won the Vietnam War.
2009	Inglourious Basterds	Quentin Tarantino	A group of Jewish-American soldiers assassinate Hitler in Paris in 1944.
2009	The Invention of Lying	Ricky Gervais and Matthew Robinson	At the beginning of the story, human beings had never evolved the mental trait of deceit, and progressed to the modern world without ever having heard of dishonesty, fiction, or belief in any God(s) or religion whatsoever. The protagonist is the first individual to develop such ability and uses it to his benefit.
2011	Resistance	Amit Gupta	Based on the same-titled novel, after the June 1944 Normandy Invasion fails, the British Isles come under a German occupation.
2011	Real Steel	Shawn Levy	In the near future boxing between human fighters has been abolished and have been replaced with robots.
2013	The Great Martian War 1913–1917	Mike Slee	In an alternate World War I, instead of the Central Powers, the Allies fight off a Martian invasion.
2014	Captain America: The Winter Soldier	Russo brothers	In the Marvel Cinematic Universe, instead of Lee Harvey Oswald being the assassin of the United States President John F. Kennedy, the assassin was a legendary agent of Hydra, the Winter Soldier.
2014	Big Hero 6	Don Hall and Chris Williams	San Francisco was rebuilt after the 1906 earthquake with a Japanese motif, and renamed San Fransokyo.
2014	Predestination	The Spierig Brothers	Based on the 1950s novella "All You Zombies" which was written as a future history – space travel technology in the 1960s seems to be somewhat more advanced than in our history, and New York was hit by massive terror attacks in the 1970s. A squadron of time-traveling enforcers attempt to correct history.
2015	The Good Dinosaur	Peter Sohn	The K-T extinction is averted, and non-avian dinosaurs live long enough to develop a kind of agricultural civilization.
2015	April and the Extraordinary World	Christian Desmares and Franck Ekinci	The Franco-Prussian War never happened, and emperors of House Bonaparte still rule France. In 1941, the greatest scientists (Albert Einstein, Enrico Fermi...) have mysteriously disappeared so the world only uses coal as an energy source and planet is totally deforested.
2015	World Wide What?	Adam Townsend and Andy Trace	The World Wide Web, or the Internet as we know it today, is never invented.
2016	Love Is All You Need?	K. Rocco Shields	Set in a world were homosexuality is the norm and heterosexuality is a taboo if practiced outside a designated breeding season. There are also differences in gender roles.
2017	Blade Runner 2049	Denis Villeneuve	The setting builds on the continuity of the 1982 film (which depicted a futuristic, heavily urbanized Los Angeles in 2019). Analog technology is shown to be widespread in 2049, and defunct corporations in our reality (like Pan Am) as well as countries like the Soviet Union are shown to be thriving in the film's future.
2018	Overlord	Julius Avery	The plot follows several American paratroopers who are dropped behind enemy lines in an Alternate 1940s, where the US Armed Forces are desegregated in 1944 (In real life the US military was desegregated on 26 July 1948) the day before D-Day and discover terrifying Nazi experiments.
2019	Yesterday	Danny Boyle	A man finds himself in a world where the Beatles (among other celebrities and products) never existed.
2019	Once Upon a Time in Hollywood	Quentin Tarantino	Members of the Manson Family, (Tex, Sadie, and Katie) decide to murder western actor Rick Dalton and his stunt double Cliff Booth instead of actress Sharon Tate on the night of 8 August 1969, but are eventually stopped and killed by both Booth and Dalton.
2019	The Mandela Effect	David Guy Levy	Initially set in an alternate world where certain collectively false memories (popularly called the Mandela effect) are real.
2021	Justice Society: World War II	Jeff Wamester	In the Multiverse, the Atlanteans and Nazis attempt an invasion of New York.
2021	Jungle Cruise	Jaume Collet-Serra	In an alternate timeline, a skipper of a riverboat, along with a scientist and her brother, journey through the Amazon, the expedition is motivated by the search for the Tree of Life.
2022	Weird: The Al Yankovic Story	Eric Appel	A parody biographical film with an alternate life story of American parody musician "Weird Al" Yankovic. Yankovic becomes the most popular musician of all time and dates a sociopathic version of singer Madonna that becomes a drug lord by taking over the drug network of Pablo Escobar after Yankovic murders him to rescue her from a kidnapping. She assassinates Yankovic in 1985 at a major award ceremony.
2024	Y2K	Jeff Wamester	The Y2K problem involving computers was not averted and as was feared at the time, caused major disasters on 1 January 2000.
2024	The Kingdom	Mike Tuviera	The film is set in the modern day where the Philippines is a monarchy known as the Kingdom of Kalayaan which has never been colonized.
2025	The Electric State	Russo Brothers	In an alternate 1990s, robots are exiled after a failed uprising.

== TV shows ==
Original run	Title	Description
1963–present	Doctor Who	This series has made extensive use of alternative history, especially (but not exclusively) since its relaunch in 2005. These include Inferno, Day of the Daleks, Pyramids of Mars (a brief glimpse of a dead Earth), "Father's Day", "Rise of the Cybermen", which follows into "Doomsday".
1966–2005	Star Trek	This series has used the theme several times. Examples include: TOS- "The City on the Edge of Forever" (alternate World War II outcome); Enterprise- "Storm Front" where Nazis seized East Coast of America.
1978	An Englishman's Castle	A 3-part BBC mini-series focusing on television writer Peter Ingram, who lives in a present-day Britain in which Nazi Germany won World War II.
1983	Blackadder	Secret history: upon the death of Richard III in 1485 at Battle of Bosworth Field, Richard IV is crowned king of England, but this has (according to the prologue) been censored out of official histories by Henry VII, leaving the history we know.
1985	Otherworld	A family is transported to an alternate Earth while exploring the Great Pyramid of Giza.
1987	Amerika	An ABC TV miniseries about life in the United States after a bloodless takeover engineered by the Soviet Union. The miniseries takes place in 1997
1995–2000	Sliders	A gang of scientists, a musician and others as travellers who "slide" between parallel worlds by use of a wormhole referred to as an "Einstein-Rosen-Podolsky bridge". First episode was Soviet-ruled America after Soviets seized Americas. Other episodes were many alternate Earths as British America, Ancient Egyptian-ruled America, Spanish America, Druids-controlling America, Atomic Bombs never existed, and others.
1995	Spellbinder	In an alternate world where static electricity is used as a power source.
1997	Spellbinder: Land of the Dragon Lord	Sequel to original TV show.
1997	Red Dwarf	The episode "Tikka to Ride" deals with a timeline in which John F. Kennedy was never assassinated.
1999	Blackadder: Back and Forth	A spoof of Doctor Who where a time traveling Blackadder's meddling with history causes changes including a French victory at the Battle of Waterloo.
2001	Princess of Thieves	This retelling of the Robin Hood legend takes the legend's customary historical exaggeration to extremes, by ending with Richard the Lionheart being succeeded as King of England, not by his brother John Lackland, but by his son Philip of Cognac.
2003–04	Evil Con Carne	The series takes place in a year 2002 where the League of Nations still existed.
2004–05	Zipang	A Japanese warship is sent back in time to World War II, altering much of the situation at Midway, but also alters the loss of USS Wasp (CV-7), in which it is destroyed by a Tomahawk missile instead of being lost to a submarine.
2006	The Boondocks: Return of the King	Martin Luther King Jr. survives his assassination, waking up from a coma 32 years later.
2006	Code Geass	Britannia, the descendant of what was once Britain, is the primary world power and conquers Japan through the use of mecha called Knightmare Frames; an exiled Britannian prince named Lelouch leads the Japanese resistance against them.
2009	Fringe	In the episode "There's More Than One of Everything", Olivia Dunham ends up in a world where 9/11 still happens, but only the White House and The Pentagon were targeted while the World Trade Center remained standing.
2011	Futurama	In the episode "All The presidents' Heads", during a trip back in time, Fry accidentally causes Paul Revere to misdirect the American Revolutionaries, creating a timeline in which the American Revolution failed, and Great Britain went on to conquer all of North America, renaming it "West Britannia".
2011	Supernatural	In the episode "My Heart Will Go On", the Titanic never sank and the goddess Atropos is killing the descendants of survivors who should have died.
2013	What If...? Armageddon 1962	John F. Kennedy is assassinated in December 1960, and under Lyndon B. Johnson's leadership, the Cuban Missile Crisis snowballs into nuclear war.
2014	Ascension	In 1963, the U.S. government launches a covert space mission sending 600 volunteers aboard the USS Ascension self-sustaining [generation ship], on what should be a century-long voyage to colonize a planet orbiting Proxima Centauri to assure the survival of the human race from the escalation of Cold War.
2015	The Man in the High Castle	Based on the book with the same title, the show portrays a 1962 in which the Axis powers won World War II and divided the Americas.
2016	11.22.63	Based on the book 11/22/63 by Stephen King, in which the main character goes back in time trying to save John F. Kennedy and altering the course of events.
2017	Neo Yokio	Set where New York (or this universe as aforementioned 'New Yokio') that magicians saves city from take over by Demons in 19th century and gaining place in the upper echelons of society and becoming known as "magistocrats" ever since.
2017	SS-GB	British drama series set in a 1941 alternative timeline in which the United Kingdom is occupied by Nazi Germany during the Second World War.
2018	1983	Polish Netflix original series set in 2003. Two decades after a 1983 terrorist attack, a law student and cop uncover a conspiracy that's kept Poland as a police state and the Iron Curtain standing.
2019	Love, Death & Robots	In the 17th Episode of the Netflix original series Alternate Histories, it shows six different timelines of the death of Adolf Hitler in 1908 instead of 1945.
2019–present	For All Mankind	An Apple TV+ original that explores a world where the Soviet Union was the first to land on the Moon in 1969, sparking a more intense and advanced space race that continued well into the 1990s. The point of divergence is described as Soviet space engineer Sergei Korolev surviving past 1966, leading to his technological expertise being used for the Soviet Moon landing.
2020	The Plot Against America	Adapted from the novel of the same name, is set in an alternate timeline in which Charles Lindbergh becomes president in 1940 and gradually transforms the United States into a fascist state.
2020	Hollywood	American Netflix original series set in post World War II Hollywood in 1947–1948, where traditional power dynamics in the American film industry are systematically dismantled and racism and homophobia are assigned to the dustbin of history.
2020–2022	Motherland: Fort Salem	Set in a world where women hold the dominant roles in society. Witchcraft is a real and accepted force. The Salem witch trials came to an end after an agreement between witches and the ungifted.
2020	Noughts + Crosses	Set in an alternate version of the British Isles, where African powers colonized most of Europe, and enforce a race-based hierarchy. Based on the young adult novel of the same name.
2020–present	Bridgerton	The Queen Charlotte of Mecklenburg-Strelitz is a black woman when in real life she was Caucasian. This comes from an old British urban legend with the same claims.
2021	Joseon Exorcist	This series was set in Joseon era of Korea and made extensive use of alternate history. In this alternate world, Joseon is besieged by the Fallen Angel "Azazel" from the Vatican religion. The King of Joseon called for a Vatican priest to help defeat Azazel through exorcism, and stop his demons from possessing people through a physical disease. The series was cancelled after episode 2 because many Koreans found the alternate universe offensive.
2021–2023	Loki	Showing an agency that prevents alterations to timelines and different versions of Loki from alternate universes appear.
2021–2024	What If...?	The series explores alternate timelines in the multiverse that show what would happen if major moments from the Marvel Cinematic Universe had occurred differently.
2023–present	The Last of Us	Like the game series of the same name, the main story begins twenty years after a fungal pandemic destroys civilization, and turned most of the population in to the Infected. Unlike the original game, the pandemic begins in 2003, not 2013.

== Plays ==
Year	Title	Author	Description
1946	Peace in Our Time	Noël Coward	Nazi Germany successfully invades Britain in World War II.
1995	Best	Fred Lawless	After The Beatles remove their original drummer Pete Best from their rock band and replace him with Ringo Starr, Best goes on to be a world-famous rock superstar while The Beatles are stuck as one hit wonders.
2000	The Madagascar Plan	Brian Borowka	Nazi Germany resettles the Jews on Madagascar.
2001	The Adventures of Stoke Mandeville, Astronaut and Gentleman	Fraser Charlton and Nikolas Lloyd	The British develop space travel during the reign of Queen Victoria.
2006	Picasso's Closet	Ariel Dorfman	An alternate account of Picasso's life (and possibly death) in Paris during World War II.
2007	Universal Robots	Mac Rogers	Robots take over Czechoslovakia and eventually the world just before World War II in a thought-provoking script that raises questions about the future of humanity and science.

== Video games ==
Year	Title	Description
1996	Command & Conquer: Red Alert (series)	A series of computer real time strategy video games set in an alternate timeline, created when Albert Einstein travels back to the past and eliminates Adolf Hitler in an attempt to prevent World War II from taking place. This plan indirectly backfires and results in an unchecked Soviet invasion of Europe by Joseph Stalin in 1946.
1997	Fallout (series)	A series of role playing video games set in a post-apocalyptic United States where the world's timeline diverges after World War II, in which the cultural basis and technological aspects of the 1950s and the "World of Tomorrow" remains a part of everyday life.
1999	Crimson Skies	PC game based on the original board game, the United States collapses during the Great Depression, leading to the rise of 23 nation-States in the former U.S. and Canada, new airplane and zeppelin technologies, and rampant air piracy.
2000	Gunparade March	An alien invasion occurs in 1945, before the end of World War II. The series led to the creation of an anime series.
2002	Iron Storm	World War I lasts more than half a century. At the time of the start of the game in 1964, the "Great War" (as the war is still called in that time) has gone on for fifty years.
2003	Crimson Skies: High Road to Revenge	Video game sequel to PC game.
2003	Enigma: Rising Tide	The British passenger ship Lusitania was not sunk by a German U-boat in World War I.
2003	Freedom Fighters	Set in an alternate Cold War where the Soviet Union drops the atomic bomb on Berlin in 1945 and eventually invades the United States in likely early 2000s.
2006	Hearts of Iron II: Doomsday	Contains a scenario involving Soviet forces attacking Allied forces in 1945, starting World War III.
2006	Resistance: Fall of Man	Set in 1951 Britain as human resistance forces attempt to drive out an alien species of unconfirmed origin called the Chimera.
2007	War Front: Turning Point	Set in an alternate version of World War II in which Adolf Hitler died during the early days of the war, and a more effective leadership arose to command Germany during the conflict.
2007	S.T.A.L.K.E.R. (series)	Set in an alternate Chernobyl exclusion zone where laboratories were established to research the effects of irradiation and a second catastrophe in 2006 irrevocably mutated the zone.
2007	BioShock	Set in Rapture, an underwater city built in the 1940s, during an alternate 1960.
2007	World in Conflict	Set in 1989 during the social, political, and economic collapse of the Soviet Union. However, the Soviet Union pursued a course of war to remain in power.
2008	Turning Point: Fall of Liberty	Depicts the invasion of the United States by Nazi Germany during the 1950s.
2009	Damnation	Set in the early part of the twentieth century after the American Civil War has spanned over several decades, where steam engines replace internal combustion engines.
2010	BioShock 2	Sequel to BioShock. Takes place in the same city.
2010	Metro 2033	A global nuclear war devastates the world in 2013 and the surviving population has taken refuge in the Moscow Metro.
2010	Singularity	Set in an alternate 1955 where the Soviet Union finds a secret element called E-99. Thanks to the new element they are able to create the TMD. (Time Manipulation Device) which helps them take over the world in a massive third world war.
2013	Assassin's Creed III: The Tyranny of King Washington	Set in an alternate reality where George Washington has crowned himself King of the newly founded United States.
2013	The Last of Us	The story is set twenty years after a fungal pandemic collapsed civilization on 26 September 2013, and turned most of the population into the Infected.
2013	Timelines: Assault on America	Germany invades North America in World War II.
2013	BioShock Infinite	Set mostly in Columbia, a floating American city, during an alternate 1912. Prequel to BioShock.
2013	Call of Duty: Ghosts	Set after a war dubbed "Tel Aviv War" before 2005, destroyed the oil reserves of Middle East, allowing a super-state called "The Federation of the Americas" to emerge.
2013	Far Cry 3: Blood Dragon	Takes place in an alternate 2006 in a timeline where the US and the USSR fought a nuclear war.
2014	Watch Dogs	Set in the near future where surveillance, hacking, and smart city infrastructure have progressed faster and are more centralized.
2014	Wolfenstein: The New Order	Set in an alternate 1960 where Nazi Germany using extremely advanced stolen technology won World War II and now rules three quarters of the world.
2015	Wolfenstein: The Old Blood	A prequel to Wolfenstein: The New Order about an Allied stealth operation at the German base, Castle Wolfenstein in 1946.
2017	Prey	Takes place in an alternate 2035, in which John F. Kennedy was never assassinated and the Space Race led to the construction of a large crewed space station orbiting the Moon. The Cold War also continues to this day.
2017	Wolfenstein II: The New Colossus	A sequel to Wolfenstein: The New Order, set in a Nazi-occupied America in 1961.
2018	Frostpunk	Set in an alternate early 20th century where volcanic eruptions in the 1880s led to a global ice age.
2018	We Happy Few	Set in an alternate 1960s city-state off the coast of Great Britain named Wellington Wells, where the inhabitants of the town are subjected to unethical drug-induced experiments. The point of divergence is mentioned to be the election of Huey Long as President of the United States, which kept America out of WW2 leading to the invasion and occupation of Britain by Germany, as well as its subsequent impoverishment.
2019	The Outer Worlds	Set in an alternate future where William McKinley was never assassinated in 1901, leading to a future dominated by large Gilded Age-styled business trusts which have colonized other planets.
2019	Wolfenstein: Youngblood	A Threequel to MachineGames' Wolfenstein series set in 1980, 19 years after the events of The New Colossus.
2020	Art of Rally	Set in an alternative future when the Group B class of Rally cars was not discontinued.
2020	Call of Duty: Black Ops: Cold War	The Soviet Ending results in the Soviet Union secretly detonating American nuclear weapons stationed in Western Europe, making those countries fall under Soviet influence.
2020	Cyberpunk 2077	Set in a future that diverged in the late 1980s (based on the in-universe history of the tabletop RPG the game is based on). Advanced cybernetics are shown to be commonplace by 2013, the Japanese economic miracle led to Japan becoming a corporate-dominated superpower, and defunct regimes like the Soviet Union are shown to be powerful in 2077.
2023	Atomic Heart	The Soviet Union develops robots in 1936 and when the Nazis invade in 1941, The Soviets are able to defeat the Nazis much earlier (in 1942 instead of 1945) by using the robots as soldiers.
2024	Pacific Drive	Set in an alternate 1998 where experiments done in the Olympic Peninsula during the mid-20th century led to anomalous phenomena in the region, resulting in a restricted zone being created by the US government
2025	Atomfall	Set in an alternate 1960s where the Windscale nuclear disasters turned much of Northwest England into a radioactive quarantine zone.
2026	Valor Mortis	In an alternate 19th centruary where Napoleon Boneparte won the Battle of Waterloo, but now his endless war unleashed a supernatural plague.

== Radio ==
Year	Title	Description
2026	Fork in the Road: Cherie on Top	A BBC Radio 4 drama in which Cherie Blair was elected as an MP in the 1983 United Kingdom general election instead of Tony Blair, and Cherie becomes Prime Minister.

== See also ==
- American Civil War alternate histories
- Axis victory in World War II
- List of fictional British monarchs
- List of fictional timelines
- List of fictional universes
- List of science fiction novels
- List of steampunk works
- Uchronia: The Alternate History List
