= 1824 (disambiguation) =

1824 may refer to:

- The year 1824
- 1824 (board game)
- The novel, 1824: The Arkansas War
