= The Test (novella) =

2019 novella by Sylvain Neuvel

- First edition
- Author: Sylvain Neuvel
- Publisher: St. Martin's Press
- Publication date: 2019
- ISBN: 9781250312822

The Test is a 2019 fiction novella by Sylvain Neuvel. An Iranian takes a British immigration test consisting of 25 questions.
