= Dark December (novel) =

1960 novel by Alfred Coppel

- Author: Alfred Coppel
- Language: English
- Genre: Post-apocalyptic fiction
- Publication date: 1960
- Publication place: United States

Dark December is a 1960 post-apocalyptic novel by American pulp magazine writer Alfred Coppel whose best-known short stories and novels have been in the genre of science fiction.

== Plot ==
A nuclear war which left the US and the entire world devastated is over at last. The war-weary Major Kenneth Gavin is discharged. Leaving the enclave where the remnants of the US Army keep some semblance of order, he sets off on a quest into the wilderness which had been California, on a quest to reach his home - though having no idea if anything was left of it - and trying to make something of the life left to him in this harsh new world. He crosses areas where every living thing had been vaporized, countryside where anthrax and radiation sickness are killing off the survivors, where gangs of homeless kids had reverted to savagery and would murder for a pair of shoes and where women had slipped to the last stages of degradation.

A crucial point in the book is the moment when Gavin finds a Soviet Air Force pilot who had parachuted onto American soil. With no organized government left to establish Prisoner of War Camps and uphold the Geneva Conventions, the pilot was captured by boys who are constantly torturing and degrading him, venting upon him their anger and frustration. Gavin's determination to save the Russian brings him into a head-on confrontation with another officer roaming the ruins - Major Collingwood, a fanatic and ruthless militarist and nationalist determined to rebuild the same order which had led to the devastating war.

Eventually, Gavin wins his struggle with Collingwood - a moral as well as material victory - and in the cautiously optimistic ending, finds a new love and the possibility of making a new start.

== Themes ==
As noted by Edward Cook: "Coppel clearly disapproved of the Cold War ideology, prevalent at the time of writing - but his book should not be reduced to simply a cautionary tale about the danger of nuclear war, a danger which we in 1993 consider (hopefully, not prematurely) to have receded. 'Dark December' carries a strongly humane message, which could be relevant as long as human beings are faced with moral choices. In this book, bestial and dark instincts make their very conspicuous appearance, but unlike in Lord of the Flies they can be overcome. Common decency, solidarity, compassion, love, eventually win out in the most harsh of tests, against overwhelming odds.(...) It is not an overtly religious book, but Collingwood is gradually transformed from simply an extremely authoritarian and fanatic human being into a virtual manifestation of Satan, Evil incarnate - and Coppel manages to make that transformation chillingly believable. (...) The choice of the protagonist's name might not be accidental. Sir Gavin (or Gawain) was among the most famous of King Arthur's Knights, and the quest he undertakes in Sir Gawain and the Green Knight is decided on moral more than physical grounds".
