= Uchronia: The Alternate History List =

Online general-interest book database

- Website type: Online database
- Owner: Robert B. Schmunk
- Creators: Robert B. Schmunk and Evelyn C. Leeper
- Website: www.uchronia.net
- Commercial: No
- Registration: None
- Launched: 1997
- Current status: 3300 entries

Uchronia: The Alternate History List is an online general-interest book database containing a bibliography of alternate history novels, stories, essays and other printed material. It is owned and operated by Robert B. Schmunk. Uchronia was twice selected as the Sci Fi Channel's "Sci Fi Site of the Week."

== Background ==
Uchronia catalogues and chronicles over 3300 published alternate history novels, short stories, anthologies, collections, series, as well as including reference material and works published in other languages. Entries indicate the original publication date, the point of divergence and a brief synopsis of the plot. A search mechanism that can identify works by author, keyword or language of publication/translation is also included.

Uchronia features a couple of real-world timelines: one devoted to alternate histories published before the Golden Age of Science Fiction, and another offering a complex chronological outline of point of divergences of the entries.

Uchronia contains large cover art gallery and links to Amazon.com in order to obtain the listed alternate history books.

Uchronia also hosts the main website for the Sidewise Award for Alternate History.

== See also ==
- List of alternate history fiction
- Uchronia
