= Until the Last of Me =

2022 novel by Sylvain Neuvel

- First edition cover
- Author: Sylvain Neuvel
- Language: English
- Series: Take Them to the Stars
- Genre: Alternate history; Science fiction
- Publisher: Tor Books
- Publication date: March 2022
- Publication place: Canada
- Media type: Hardback
- Pages: 304
- ISBN: 978-1-250-26211-0
- Preceded by: A History of What Comes Next
- Followed by: For the First Time, Again

Until the Last of Me is a 2022 science fiction alternate history novel by Canadian writer Sylvain Neuvel. It was first published in March 2022 in the United States by Tor Books, and in the United Kingdom by Michael Joseph. The book is the second of three books in Neuvel's Take Them to the Stars series, preceded by A History of What Comes Next (2021) and followed by For the First Time, Again (2023).

Until the Last of Me is set between the late-1960s and the late-1980s during the Cold War. It is about a group of women who continue to manipulate history to get humanity into space The novel's chapter titles are titles of songs from the period in which the chapters take place.

== Plot introduction ==
Mia and her daughter, Lola are the 99th and 100th generation of the mysterious Kibsu, a society of powerful women whose goal it is to save humanity, and ultimately get them into space. Until the Last of Me covers their influence in the United States' Space Shuttle program, and the Pioneer and Voyager space probes, and the Soviet Union's Venera planetary probes, and the Vostok cosmonaut program.

In addition to pursuing the Kibsu's goals, Mia and Lola also must evade the Tracker, an equally mysterious clan of men whose aim it is to seek and destroy the Kibsu. One of the Trackers is Samael, a young man who fights against his fellow Tracker's homicidal tendencies.

== Critical reception ==
In a review of Until the Last of Me in Library Journal, Kristi Chadwick described the novel as "an exciting science fiction thriller that will in turn inform and surprise readers." A reviewer at Publishers Weekly wrote that while Until the Last of Me "lacks the nail-biting action" of the first book in the series, its emphasis on Lola and Samael's struggles "add[s] depth to the drama".

Mark Yon wrote in SFFWorld that he found Until the Last of Me "difficult to put down". In a review of the book, he stated that he liked the way Neuvel merges fiction with historical figures and events, and how the novel "builds relentlessly until the classic conflict at the end." But Yon did have some reservations. He felt that parts of the plot "didn't work" for him, and that too much attention was given to US space achievements, the Space Shuttle and the Pioneer and Voyager programs, and not enough to the Soviet Venera probes, and the Vostok program.

Reviewing Until the Last of Me at Tor.com, Tobias Carroll was impressed with the way the book tells the story from "a highly limited perspective", yet alludes to a much bigger picture. Carroll added that while Neuvel has carefully balanced the mysteries of the Take Them to the Stars series with the slow reveal of answers, he found that the limited perspective used in many of the chapters "can frustrate somewhat". He felt that not enough is given to explain "just how everything is coming together".
