= The Life Eaters =

2003 graphic novel by David Brin

- Cover of The Life Eaters by David Brin, cover art by Scott Hampton.

Publication information
- Publisher: WildStorm
- Genre: Alternate history
- Publication date: 2003

Creative team
- Written by: David Brin
- Artist: Scott Hampton
- Letterer: Todd Klein
- Editor(s): Jeff Mariotte; Scott Dunbier; Kristy Quinn

The Life Eaters is a 2003 science fiction graphic novel written by David Brin, art by Scott Hampton and lettering by Todd Klein. The 144 page work was published by WildStorm.

The story is based on Brin's Hugo-nominated novella Thor Meets Captain America, featuring an alternate history where the Nazis are winning World War II, using occult practices and enlisting the aid of the Norse pantheon.

== Publication history ==
The novel was first published by WildStorm (imprint of DC Comics) in November 2003 (ISBN 1-4012-0098-2). In 2013 it was republished by IDW Publishing (ISBN 978-1-63140-201-2).

The novel was translated to French as D-day, le jour du désastre, published by Les Humanoïdes Associés in 2004.

== Story ==
The universe presented in the story diverges in late 1943, when a number of bright lights appear over Nazi-occupied Europe. Intentionally or otherwise, the slaughter of the death camps has been used to summon the Æsir, the Norse gods. Nazi Germany quickly allies themselves with the gods and uses a magical barrage of cyclones to cripple the Allies at the Normandy landings. The extended war has a significant impact on human technology; by the 1950s, the U.S. military has a crewed spy satellite.

The first third of the story takes place in 1962. Although at one point the Americans dropped a nuclear bomb on Berlin, killing Æsirs Muninn and Heimdall, the Allies are slowly losing the war. By that time, the Nazis had already conquered Great Britain, Africa, and Russia, among other territories, and invaded Canada. It follows OSS Captain Chris Turing, who is part of the team which is going to attack Valhalla (located near Gotland on the Baltic), entering it through an airlifted submarine, with the aim of delivering a hydrogen bomb payload, while what remains of the U.S. Navy's surface fleet attempts to distract the Nazi and Norse pantheon forces. Turing's team is accompanied by the trickster Norse god, Loki, who apparently works against his fellow Æsir. Back in 1943, on the night they arrived, Loki used his magic to whisk hundreds of thousands of death camp internees to safety in Persia. Loki, who until then has only given humans some small hints about his and Æsir's true nature, allows Turing to ask him three questions. Loki answers the questions asked, and in one answer mentions how he does not think that he is older than Chris and also implies that the Nazi extermination camps were established for reasons other than for "Nazi racial purification", but refuses to answer any further questions to clarify this. The group arrives at Gotland, and during the operation, Loki disappears as Æsir forces led by Thor defeat the troops.

The American government had assumed the Æsir were alien invaders, but later during the mission, Thor and Loki reveal the secret of how the Æsir were brought into being, namely that the Nazis used death camps to fuel necromancy on a massive scale to summon them. The Æsir tell this to their human prisoners as they are about to die, assuming they would never have the chance to let anyone else know the truth. Although the mission's primary objective is a failure, and Valhalla remains standing, Turing manages to destroy Odin's Spear, inspiring human resistance, as his deed is seen by Æsir's human servants who spread the news of it to others.

The protagonists of the second part of the story are Joe Kasting, an American meteorologist-drafted-soldier by the Nazis, and an SS officer narrator, who once witnessed Turing's act of defiance and secretly harbors hopes that Æsir and other mythical beings could be destroyed and humanity saved. The second part of the story takes place years later, by which time the Nazis have already conquered North America, while their allies from the Empire of Japan, aided by their Shinto pantheon, control parts of Asia. Although the United States has become part of the Nazi domain, a war of the supernatural continues as knowledge of necromancy spreads throughout the globe. The surviving nations of the Southern Hemisphere have learned how to summon their own "gods", and each side slaughters millions to summon mythological beings who can fight to kill the other nations' gods. As a result of "Asian faith and African desperation... and all the madness of the tropics", the multiple gods of the developing world are given form through human sacrifice (hence the title of the novel, "life eaters"), banding together and fighting the Æsir (who prefer the colder regions). As the Tropicals advance, they burn the Arabian oilfields, leading to global warming. With the potential of the Æsir creating a nuclear winter to counter the global warming, the remaining free humans (including underwater-dwelling survivors of the Allies, and Abrahamites, a necromancy-averse alliance of monotheistic religions centered around the Middle East) attempt to prevent the gods from destroying the world as Loki schemes to fulfill the Ragnarok prophecy. The latter is revealed to be related to the use of Yggdrasil as a space elevator connecting to a space habitat, where the Æsir want to shelter a few human survivors (for most Æsir, "brave warriors", but for Loki, the "clever" humans). The human protagonists, however, defy the Æsir's plans by stealing energy from Yggdrasil, briefly transforming Kasting into a new deity, who then renounces his new powers, transferring it back to Earth, hoping to strengthen the planet's natural environment against the predicted "weather war".

== Analysis ==
The story is based on Brin's Hugo-nominated novella Thor Meets Captain America; the first third of the novel is a retelling of that story.

In the author's notes for Thor Meets Captain America, David Brin records that he was invited by Gregory Benford to write a piece for an alternate history collection, entitled Hitler Victorious, but voiced the opinion that he could not think of a single event which, if altered, would have let the Nazis win the war, and, contrariwise, that they had required a number of lucky breaks to get as far as they did (see also: alien space bats). Benford's reply was "I bet you could think of some premise that would work, David". That story was the result. Brin also notes in the afterword of his story that he wrote it as a possible explanation for why the Nazis "do so many horrible, pointless things". In the afterword of the graphic novel, he notes that modern popular culture forgets about the sinister side of mythical (the black magic) and that many of our modern stories have "a tendency to follow the old trope of Homer - the notion that super-empowered demigods matter more than the hard, cooperative work of skilled men and women". He then adds that one of the messages of his story is that "a world needs saving, in myriad ways" and that the force that will save us will not be mythical beings, or aliens, or superheroes, but instead he is "betting on us" to do so.

In 2004, Steve Raiteri argued that "Brin's desire to downplay the role of heroes and highlight the good work of the average person is notable in a field full of superheroes, but in the end it mitigates the strength of the story".

In 2012, comics researcher Ralf Palandt considered The Life Eaters a "mythically overburdened", "rather ambivalent" and "highly provocative" example of alternate history writing. While praising David Brin's drawings as "opulent", he found the plot idea of the Nazis gaining the support of the Norse gods through the millions of dead caused by the regime "grossly trivializing, infamous and vulgar". Likewise, Palandt called a scene of Loki liberating a concentration camp "dubious", and found the resolution with opposing armies of deities from developing countries causing a climate catastrophe "crude".

In 2013, Dalibor Vácha wrote that "The Life Eaters comic connects Norse mythology with the mythologies of other nations (and continents) and historical reality in a pop culture mix characteristic of the entire genre".

In 2017, writing in a book Perpetrators in Holocaust Narratives: Encountering the Nazi Beast, Joanne Pettitt uses the work as an example of how "Nazism has come to occupy a position in our cultural imagination that is akin to that... mythological heroes" such as superheroes. In 2018, in the Journal of Graphic Novels and Comics, she revisited the topic, arguing that the central motif of the story is about the need to disempower or "disavow the myths" (what she calls "demythologisation"). She also discusses how the discourse of the Holocaust in the novel can be seen as problematic, simplifying it into a trivial popculture icon, a simple symbol of evil ("The Holocaust as a historical tragedy is glossed over in favour of its (potentially) more light-hearted focus on the divine/super beings"), while at the same time noting that one reading of the novel could be as a critique of this very approach. That reading would be the one that focuses on the need to "move beyond the genocide's haunting presence", not by forgetting it but by refocusing the narrative from a story about superheroes to one that "confronts the human actions and motivations that led to the genocide". Pettitt also discusses how the novel's plot, in which Holocaust victims are rescued and teleported to other parts of the world, gives the story a global context, allowing for a discussion of the Holocaust in the global, rather than just European, context. In her earlier book, she concluded that the novel "challenges the reader to move beyond mythologised understandings of Nazism and expel its overtly destructive force".

== Reception ==
The work received a number of reviews.

In 2003, Cindy Lynn Speer-reviewed the graphic novel for SF Site. She saw the work as a "cleverly written what-if story... often times as optimistic as it is heartbreaking" that tackles intriguing ideas such as Nazism and the occult, and "what happens when... pantheons come to life". She praised the story's heroes as "admirable [humans who] make us feel optimistic about the future of human kind [sic]." She also concluded that Hampton's art was a "good match for Brin's prose", in particular commenting on his fitting choice of "subdued palette of colors."

In April 2004, Charles de Lint for The Magazine of Fantasy & Science Fiction wrote how the novel had "all the drama, scope, and power of one of the old Norse sagas" and how Brin was "working on a grand scale here, juggling many balls, and not dropping any." The reviewer praised the storyline for being "gripping", the dialogue for suiting "all the different voices", the characters for feeling "real", remarked on the novel discussing how modern technologies were "developed in different circumstances" and "how world politics would have adjusted", and noting how the majority of the novel's artwork was "painted" and therefore brought "Brin's dark visions to life."

In August that year, Paul Di Filippo reviewed the work for Asimov's Science Fiction. Filippo positively commented on the art - opining that Hampton's "harsh-edged, yet graceful painted art" was "the perfect match for a grim tale", and how his "appropriately subdued" palette allowed for "such bright contrasting flashes as the blue of a Hindu deity". Di Filippo appreciated fleshed out main characters, and elements of the setting, such as portrayal of Yggdrasil as a space elevator and also noted that "the story's conclusion is open-ended yet hopeful", expressing hope that a sequel would appear.

Also that year, writing for the Library Journal, Steve Raiteri wrote that Hampton's paintings were "realistic and often powerful." He also noted that the book is recommended for mature audiences "mid-teens and up" due to it featuring "bloody violence and minor nudity."

Also that year, in Publishers Weekly, Jeff Zaleski praised the novel for having "lots of imaginative details" but criticized it for having a sense of "heavy-handed preachiness", such as an "inappropriately clunky" vision of "ash-induced" global warming, a "dreadfully sappy" plot point in which all religious leaders "put aside their differences to defend the planet" and part of the climax - a scene in which a "human is tempted by divine power" - appearing to come "straight out of a mid-1960s superhero comic." Likewise, he had mixed feelings about the art, seeing Hampton's style as good for "larger-than-life images" but less so for "punch-'em-up action scenes and talking-heads sequences."

In 2016, in Hampton's entry in The Art of Painted Comics, the authors positively reviewed his work, noting that his "subdued palette and vivid details [combine] to create an intricately realized world populated by avatars of the Norse gods."
