= For the First Time, Again =

2023 novel by Sylvain Neuvel

- First edition cover
- Author: Sylvain Neuvel
- Language: English
- Series: Take Them to the Stars
- Genre: Alternate history; Science fiction
- Publisher: Tor Books
- Publication date: April 2023
- Publication place: Canada
- Media type: Hardback
- Pages: 320
- ISBN: 978-1-250-26257-8
- Preceded by: Until the Last of Me

For the First Time, Again is a 2023 science fiction alternate history novel by Canadian writer Sylvain Neuvel. It was first published in April 2023 in the United States by Tor Books, and in the United Kingdom by Michael Joseph. The book is the last of three books in Neuvel's Take Them to the Stars series, preceded by A History of What Comes Next (2021) and Until the Last of Me (2022).

For the First Time, Again is set between the late-1990s and the mid-2000s, and is about a group of women who continue to manipulate history to get humanity into space The novel's chapter titles are titles of songs from the period in which the chapters take place.

== Plot introduction ==
Aster is the last of the mysterious Kibsu. Her mother Lola died when Aster was very young, leaving her orphaned and without any knowledge of the Kibsu and their goals. Samael, the last of the Trackers, brings Aster up and tells her about the Kibsu and the Tracker's extraterrestrial origins. The Kibsu had been tasked with protecting Earth from another alien invasion by sending humanity into space, while the Tracker's goal was to locate and trigger a beacon to draw the invading aliens to Earth.

== Critical reception ==
In a review in Library Journal, Kristi Chadwick stated that For the First Time, Again "fill[s] in the final pieces of this science-fiction puzzle." Chadwick said Neuvel "creates an active story" by "[b]alancing actual historic events with the alien pursuit". A reviewer at Publishers Weekly wrote that readers of the Take Them to the Stars series "will not be disappointed" with its conclusion. They said "Neuvel keeps the frantically paced plot tight and effectively counterbalances all the action with nuanced character work."

Mark Yon wrote in SFFWorld that he found For the First Time, Again "an enjoyable ride for those wanting to continue the journey." He said that because Aster has been brought up by Samael, an ex-Tracker, and with no Kibsu supervision, "the novel does not always go the way you expect it to", which may be "refreshing" for some readers, but "frustrating" for others. Yon added that despite being the last book of Neuvel's trilogy, he felt that "a key element [of the story] remains unresolved", which could open the door for another series.

Reviewing For the First Time, Again at Tor.com, Tobias Carroll described the novel as "eminently readable", although he did find its timeline having moved beyond the Cold War "downplayed some of the tension". Carroll was impressed with the way Neuvel turned seemingly innocuous things into pivotal plot components, and found the book's endnotes "some of the most intriguing elements" of the story.
