= The Adventures of Stoke Mandeville, Astronaut and Gentleman =

The Adventures of Stoke Mandeville, Astronaut and Gentleman is a comedy play by Fraser Charlton and Nikolas Lloyd. The action is set in a universe with an alternate history in which the British developed the craft of space travel during the reign of Queen Victoria. The modern day world is populated by stereotypically stoic Englishmen, and vile scheming Frenchmen who will stoop to any depth in order to thwart the ambitions and harmony of the British Empire.

The title character shares his name with the Buckinghamshire village of Stoke Mandeville and its well-known hospital.

The play was originally written as six half-hour episodes for BBC Radio 4, and a pilot episode was recorded, but Radio 4 decided not to go ahead with commissioning a series from two unknown writers. Instead, the script was turned into a stage play, and was first performed in Newcastle in the Black Swan Court in 2001 with a cast of just five, including the two writers, who all had to play multiple parts. After this, the play was revised for performance at the Edinburgh Festival Fringe and with a slightly different cast ran for two weeks in 2002 at Augustine's. It has since been performed a few more times, notably at Cambridge University in 2003, Highgate in 2004, Guildford (Surrey) in 2007 (where it was voted best event of the year by the students of the University of Surrey), Adelaide Australia 2009, and several more productions have been proposed.

The play's two chief influences are Douglas Adams's The Hitchhikers' Guide to the Galaxy and the role play game Space 1889, although another is Sir Henry at Rawlinson End by Vivian Stanshall.

The website (link below) contains reviews, programme notes, and many examples of the play's robust and utterly politically incorrect humour.

The minimum cast for the play is five, one woman and four men, although since there are many parts, a far larger cast could be used. The running time for the Edinburgh version is one hour and fifteen minutes, which is about ideal for the Festival Fringe.

Posters and fliers for the productions displayed the following statement: "The management wishes to assure all patrons that under no circumstances shall persons of a French nature be admitted to the auditorium."

== Critical reaction ==
Reaction from critics has been generally good. However, the 2002 Edinburgh production gained a poor review from The Scotsman, which awarded 2 stars. The review was written by someone who had not attended the show. Only two days before, The Scotsman had published an article by Robert McNeil, who had seen the production, praising the show.

== Video Version ==
The first episode of a video version of the story appeared on YouTube on 4 July 2012. The video version stars professional actor Jamie Osborn as Graham Pennyworth. Having a very low budget, the videos were shot in a disused art gallery, with all the actors against a green-screen.
