= World Wide What? =

- Directed by: Adam Townsend and Andy Trace
- Screenplay by: Adam Townsend and Andy Trace
- Produced by: Poppy Gaye
- Narrated by: Stephen Fry
- Release date: 2015
- Country: United Kingdom
- Language: English

World Wide What? is a 2015 British film written, directed and filmed by Adam Townsend and Andy Trace of Cavalier, and produced by Poppy Gaye of Founders Forum. The film shows a parallel universe in which Tim Berners-Lee failed to invent the World Wide Web and the subsequent impact that would have on the lives of high-profile tech entrepreneurs. The film is narrated by Stephen Fry, and includes cameos from Jimmy Wales, Arianna Huffington, Sean Parker, Tim Berners-Lee, Reid Hoffman, Michael Bloomberg, Michael Acton Smith, Martha Lane Fox, Baroness Lane-Fox of Soho, Brent Hoberman, and Steve Case.

== Plot ==
The film begins in 1989 at the offices of the European Organization for Nuclear Research, also known as CERN, where Tim Berners Lee is working on his aspirations for the World Wide Web. He reflects to himself in private that this project could go on to promote "world peace" and also help people "share pictures of kittens". Upon leaving his office, Stephen Fry describes how a short-sighted assistant could have changed the course of humanity if she had accidentally put Tim Berners Lee's research in a waste paper basket. The film then goes on to depict a succession of sketches played out by global tech entrepreneurs, in which they are forced to carry out analogue versions of their digital jobs. In order of appearance:

- Arianna Huffington is a newspaper girl, throwing paper copies of the Huffington Post onto doorsteps
- Sean Parker is unable to keep himself occupied with Napster and creates his own selfie empire of polaroids instead
- Steve Case is a postman delivering huge quantities of junk mail to people whilst repeatedly stating You've got mail, a phrase synonymous with AOL
- Venture Capitalist Danny Rimer is left creating his own infomercials instead of investing in startup company Dropbox
- Bebo founder Michael Birch desperately tries to release funds from mafia bank owner Max Levchin, famous for founding PayPal
- Skype founder Niklas Zennström, as an expert in communications, is asked to crack the Enigma Machine
- Martha Lane Fox, Baroness Lane-Fox of Soho visits the man who helped her float lastminute.com to try and book a holiday
- Brent Hoberman is a holiday sales agent, desperately trying to sell a holiday
- Reid Hoffman is a secretary using a Rolodex to categorise the entire world
- Michael Acton Smith is a street vendor selling Moshi Monsters toys
- Fon founder Martín Varsavsky is a nuisance caller, asking people if they want a new deal on their 'fon'
- Jonathan Goodwin (entrepreneur) is a hunter looking for a Unicorn (finance)
- Candy Crush and King founder Ricardo Zucconi is selling sweets in a sweet shop
- Michael Bloomberg is still working at Bloomberg, but as a journalist working on the latest edition of his paper
- Jimmy Wales stays true to the principles of Wikipedia whilst working as a librarian, encouraging people to make edits to books

The film then returns to CERN to find Tim Berners Lee desperately looking for his research for creating the World Wide Web. As he becomes more and more distressed, his assistant walks through the door holding the papers, stating that she had read them overnight. When Tim Berners Lee asks her if she thinks the research stands a chance of working, she ponders "50/50", much to his disappointment.

== Production ==
The film was funded by YouTube and King, with Jimmy Wales as executive producer. The script was written by filmmaker Adam Townsend of Cavalier, at the time with Freud Communications after the initial concept was developed by Jimmy Wales and Founders Forum. The scenes were filmed in London, Los Angeles, New York, Washington and Suffolk. The scenes that took place in America were directed by Declan Masterson.
