= Faultline 49 =

2012 novel by Joe MacKinnon

- First edition
- Author: Joe MacKinnon (as David Danson)
- Language: English
- Subject: Canadian–American War, post-9/11 politics and security, occupation, imperialism
- Genre: Gonzo journalism, war correspondence, new journalism, political thriller, crime, survivalist fiction
- Publisher: Guy Faux Books
- Publication date: 2012
- Publication place: Canada
- Media type: Print, Paperback
- Pages: 257
- ISBN: 978-0-9881640-2-4
- Website: http://www.faultline49.com

Faultline 49 is an alternate history novel by Joe MacKinnon (as David Danson) that re-imagines Canada, marred by American military checkpoints, re-contextualized 9/11 attacks, rubble, and riots. The story follows an American reporter through US-occupied Canada, and depicts his metamorphosis from a petulant talking head into a hunted revolutionary. It was published in 2012.

== Plot ==
The book centers around a Seattle reporter's (David Danson) gonzo-style trip through US-occupied Canada in search of the principal provocateur in the Canadian-American War: terrorist mastermind Bruce Kalnychuk. As Danson draws closer to the truth about the 2001 World Trade Center bombing in Edmonton, Alberta, and the criminal war it propagated, his journalistic distance to the story collapses, rendering him not only a brutalized participant, but a target of the US government.

Behind the facade of Canadian pulp fiction lies an engagement with the issues of imperial overstretch, occupation, and economic/cultural sovereignty on the fringe of the American Empire. Faultline 49 has been noted to be a "250-page thought exercise [that] swaps Edmonton with New York City, and also Canada with Iraq, Afghanistan and other nations in a buildup of violence, fabrication and barely concealed geopolitical oil interests."

David Danson is a fictional personality. The actual author is Joe MacKinnon. David Danson was used to advance the simulacra.

== Publication ==
- Danson, David (2012). Faultline 49, Guy Faux Books. 978-0-9881640-2-4.
