= Alfred Coppel =

American novelist

- Born: November 9, 1921; Oakland, California, U.S.
- Died: May 30, 2004 (aged 82)
- Occupation: Author
- Writing career
- Pen name: Robert Cham Gilman; A.C. Marin
- Genre: Science fiction

Alfred Coppel, Alfredo Jose de Arana-Marini Coppel (November 9, 1921 – May 30, 2004) was an American author. Born in Oakland, he served as a fighter pilot in the United States Army Air Forces during World War II. After his discharge, he started his career as a writer. He became one of the most prolific pulp magazine authors of the 1950s and 1960s, adopting the pseudonyms Robert Cham Gilman and A.C. Marin and writing for a variety of pulp magazines and later "slick" publishers. Though writing in a variety of genres, including action thrillers, he is known for his science fiction stories which comprise both short stories and novels.

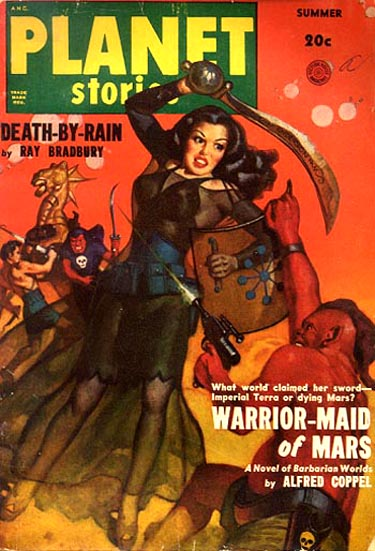
Coppel's "Warrior Maid of Mars" was the cover story in the Summer 1950 issue of Planet Stories

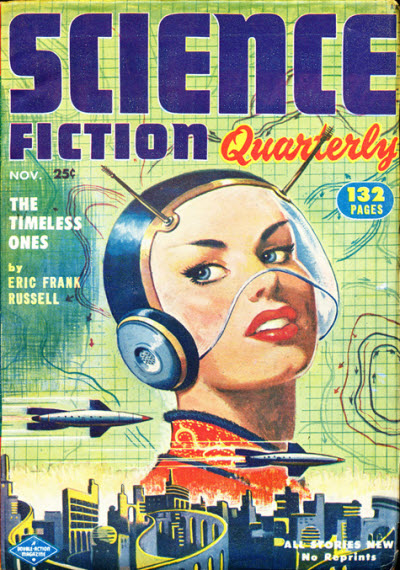
Coppel's "Defender of the Faith" was the cover story in the November 1952 issue of Science Fiction Quarterly

== Science fiction ==
Coppel's first science fiction story was "Age of Unreason" (1947) in Amazing Stories. Other short stories include "The Dreamer" (1952) about a man called Denby, who wants to be the first to orbit the Moon, published in The Magazine of Fantasy and Science Fiction and reprinted in the anthology Best Short Shorts (1958) edited by Eric Berger. His post-holocaust novel Dark December (1960) describes the aftermath of nuclear war.

As Robert Cham Gilman, he wrote the Rhada sequence of science fiction novels aimed at the young adult market. These space operas, set within a galactic empire, comprise The Rebel of Rhada (1968), The Navigator of Rhada (1969), The Starkahn of Rhada (1970) and a prequel called The Warlock of Rhada (1985). The Rebel of Rhada is an expansion, with many changes including a significantly different ending, of "The Rebel of Valkyr," published in 1950 under his own name and included in Brian Aldiss's collection Galactic Empires.

The Burning Mountain: A Novel of the Invasion of Japan (1983) is an alternate history depicting what could have happened if the United States and its allies had been forced to invade Japan in 1946, had the Trinity test of the Fat Man nuclear design on July 16, 1945, failed. This is based on the Operation Coronet and Operation Olympic, United States battle plans for the invasion of Japan, which were rendered moot by Japan's surrender after the atomic bombings of Hiroshima and Nagasaki.

== Other books ==
In 1967, he wrote The Gate of Hell, a love story about an American serving with the Israeli Paratroopers Brigade during the 1956 Suez Campaign; it was published by Pinnacle Books in 1972. In 1974, he had a bestseller with the suspense thriller Thirty-Four East about the Arab–Israeli conflict. Another political thriller was The Apocalypse Brigade, 1981, about the United States at war with global terrorism. And based on his own experiences as World War II fighter pilot, Order of Battle, a gritty account of a P-38 Lightning pilot.
