= Sylvain Neuvel =

Canadian science fiction writer

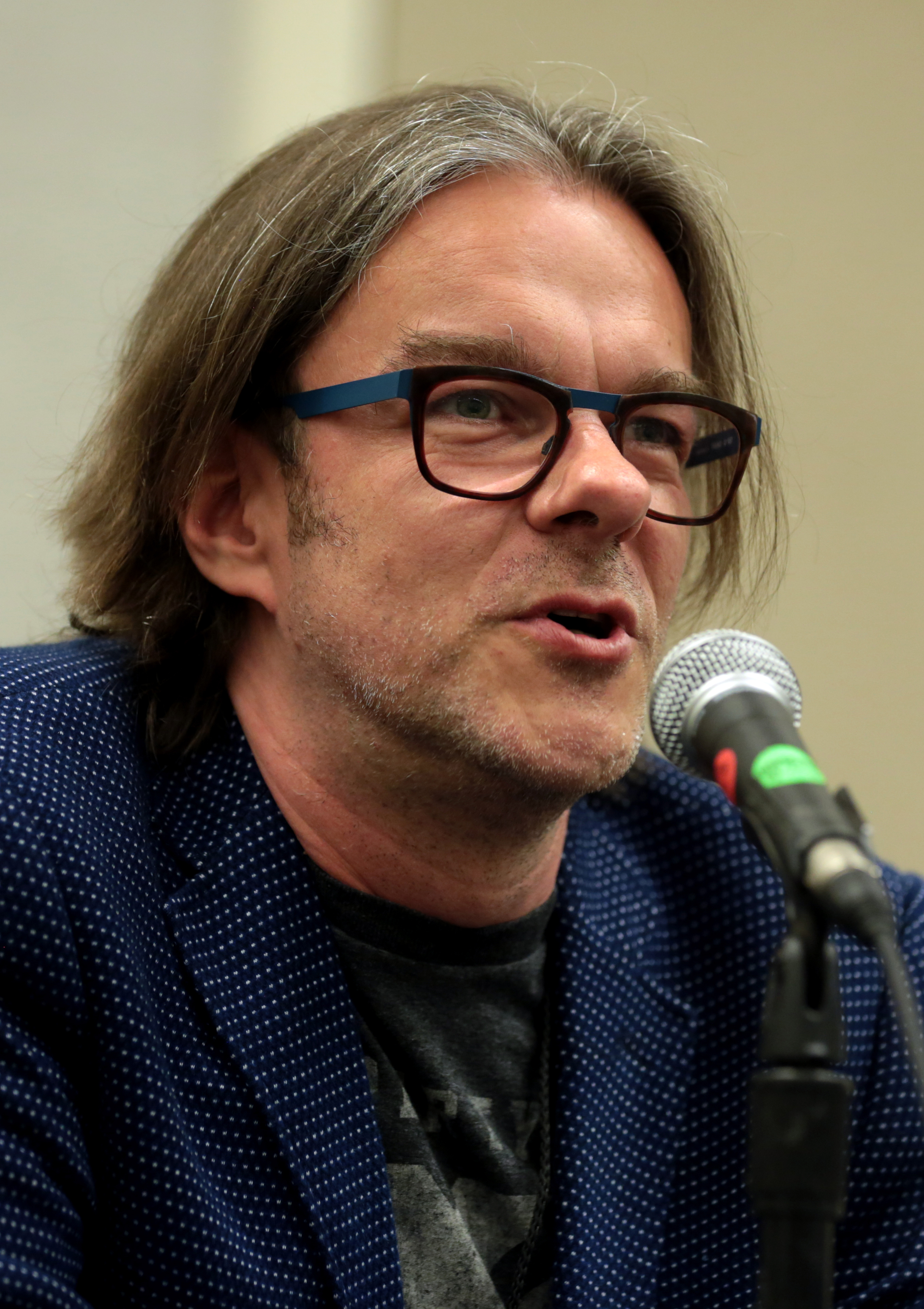
- Neuvel at the 2018 Phoenix Comic Fest
- Born: 1973 (age 52–53); Quebec City, Quebec
- Occupations: Novelist, Translator
- Writing career
- Language: English
- Years active: 2010s-present
- Genre: Science Fiction
- Notable works: The Themis Files, Take Them to the Stars

Sylvain Neuvel (born 1973) is a Canadian science fiction writer, linguist, and translator. He is the author of the series The Themis Files and Take Them to the Stars.

== Early life ==
Neuvel was born in Quebec City and raised in the suburb of L'Ancienne-Lorette. He was educated at the Université de Montréal and the University of Chicago.

== Literary career ==
The Themis Files trilogy begins with Neuvel's debut novel Sleeping Giants. It follows a group of scientists as they track down and assemble a giant robot of mysterious origins, scattered across the Earth. The idea for Sleeping Giants first came to him when Neuvel's son asked him to build a toy robot with an extended back story. The novel is written in back-and-forth dialogues, journal entries and documentation rather than through traditional narration.

Neuvel first submitted the novel to literary agents in 2014 and received 50 rejections. The novel was published by Del Rey Books in 2016. It began accumulating favourable buzz after Kirkus Reviews published a positive review of the galley copy it had received. The novel, which was a longlisted contender for the 2017 edition of Canada Reads, was optioned by Sony Pictures for development into a film. It was a finalist for the 2016 Goodreads Choice Awards for Best Science Fiction, the 2017 Compton Crook Award and for the Concordia University First Book Prize at the 2016 Quebec Writers' Federation Awards.

Neuvel was announced as one of three contributing authors of a Black Mirror book, but the project was shelved in 2018.

== Other work ==
Outside of his literary career, Neuvel runs a professional translation agency.

== Bibliography ==
=== Themis Files series ===
1. Sleeping Giants, Del Rey (2016)
2. Waking Gods, Del Rey (2017)
3. Only Human, Del Rey (2018)

The Lost Files

- "File No. 247" (2016)
- "File No. 002" (2017)
- "File No. 1743" (2018)
- "File No. 2491" (2019)

The Lost Files are a series of free, unpublished chapters that aren't essential to understanding the Themis Files but add detail to the story. The can be found on Neuvel's website.

=== Take Them to the Stars series ===
1. A History of What Comes Next, Tordotcom (2021)
2. Until the Last of Me, Tordotcom (2022)
3. For the First Time, Again, Tordotcom (2023)

=== Standalone ===
- No Kindness Too Soon, Audible (2022)
- The Test, Tordotcom (2019)
- The Many, Solaris (2026)
