= The Burning Mountain =

1983 novel by Alfred Coppel

- Title page for The Burning Mountain (1982)
- Author: Alfred Coppel
- Cover artist: Paul Bacon
- Language: English
- Genre: War
- Publisher: Harcourt Brace Jovanovich, Publishers, Charter Books
- Publication date: 1983
- Publication place: United States
- Media type: Print (hardback & paperback)
- Pages: 438, 386
- ISBN: 0-15-114978-X

The Burning Mountain is a 1983 alternate history novel by American writer Alfred Coppel. The key change in history in the novel is that the Trinity nuclear test of July 16, 1945, fails. The novel goes on to depict the outcome of Operation Downfall, the 1946 invasion of Japan by American forces. The novel takes place from numerous points of view by American and Japanese soldiers and civilians. In an afterword, the author states he based the military strategies used by the U.S. and Japan on declassified archival materials found in both countries.

The author does not mention that the Hiroshima Little Boy gun type enriched uranium bomb did not need testing. However, there was only one Little Boy, and it did not cause Japan to surrender unconditionally, so three days later the Fat Man plutonium implosion bomb, tested at Trinity, was used on Nagasaki.
