= A History of What Comes Next =

2021 novel by Sylvain Neuvel

- First edition cover
- Author: Sylvain Neuvel
- Language: English
- Series: Take Them to the Stars
- Genre: Alternate history; Science fiction
- Publisher: Tor Books
- Publication date: February 2021
- Publication place: Canada
- Media type: Hardback
- Pages: 302
- ISBN: 978-1-250-26206-6
- Followed by: Until the Last of Me

A History of What Comes Next is a 2021 science fiction alternate history novel by Canadian writer Sylvain Neuvel. It was first published in the United States in February 2021 by Tor Books, and in the United Kingdom in March 2021 by Michael Joseph. The book is the first of three books in Neuvel's Take Them to the Stars series, followed by Until the Last of Me (2022) and For the First Time, Again (2023).

A History of What Comes Next is set between 1945 and 1961 during World War II and the Cold War. It is about a group of women who manipulate history for their own ends. Some of the historical figures included in the book are German and Soviet rocket scientists Wernher von Braun and Sergei Korolev. Historical events covered include the United States' Operation Paperclip and the Soviet counterpart, Operation Osoaviakhim. The novel's chapter titles are titles of songs from the period in which the chapters take place.

== Plot introduction ==
A History of What Comes Next is about the Kibsu, a mysterious society of powerful women who have been manipulating history for three thousand years to save humanity, and ultimately get them into space. The story begins in Germany in 1945, near the end of World War II. Sara and her nineteen-year-old daughter Mia are the 98th and 99th generation of the clan, and Mia is instructed by her mother to infiltrate Germany's rocket research facility at Peenemünde and persuade rocket scientist Wernher von Braun to surrender to the advancing Americans, rather than the Russians. Then, satisfied that von Braun is working for the Americans in their space program, Sara and Mia move to Moscow, where Mia coaxes Russian rocket scientist Sergei Korolev to recruit German specialists to jumpstart Russia's own missile and space program. The Kibsu's aim is to create a space race between the Americans and Soviets that will accelerate research and development on both sides. This results in the Soviet Union launching Sputnik 1 in October 1957, followed by Explorer 1 four months later by the United States.

== Critical reception ==
Kirkus Reviews described A History of What Comes Next as "similar in tone to an X-Files episode, replete with arcane secrets, conspiracy theories, and the possibility of aliens living among us." It praised Mia's character development and her "painful and revelatory journey of self-discovery", but felt that the novel's conclusion is "abrupt and unsatisfying". In a starred review, Publishers Weekly stated that the novel "make[s] for deeply gratifying reading". It said "[t]he balance of wry narration, wired action, and delicate worldbuilding" will appeal to "[f]ans of alternate history and intelligent sci-fi.

Mark Yon wrote in SFFWorld that A History of What Comes Next "takes the tropes of the past and reuses them in an engagingly contemporary style story". He said it has "a brilliant premise" that makes it "a lot of fun" to read and must have been "a joy to write". Yon liked the characters, particularly Mia, who he described as "bright, lively, fiercely intelligent", but "not invulnerable [to making] mistakes". He said Mia reminded him of Friday in Robert Heinlein's 1982 novel of the same name, adding that "Mia is probably the epitome of what Heinlein would see as the person to carry the plot."

In a review of the book in Fantasy Literature, Bill Capossere wrote that the premise is "intriguing", but felt that because of its "structure and style, the execution didn’t allow the book to achieve its potential." Capossere liked the flashbacks to the early generations of the Kibsu and their goal of taking humanity to the stars, long before flight had even been achieved. He also liked Neuvel's portrayal of Sara and Mia's mother-daughter relationship, but felt that more backstory would have helped explain their role in the mission. Overall, Capossere found the book's dialog "flat or clumsy", and the writing, "workmanlike", but not memorable. He gave the book 2½ stars out of 5.

In another review in Fantasy Literature, Tadiana Jones was impressed by the historical research that went into this novel, and the way Neuvel merged the activities of the Kibsu into real historical events. Jones said she learnt "a lot" from the book, but found her "interest flagged after a while" because of its focus on history rather than the science fiction side of the story. She found the flashbacks "the most intriguing parts" of the story, but complained that there were not enough of them. Jones wrote that she was "deeply disappointed" with the ending, stating that it leaves "the overall plot entirely unresolved", but acknowledged that this could be addressed in the subsequent books in the Take Them to the Stars series. She gave the book 3 stars out of 5.
