= 1812: The Rivers of War =

2005 novel by Eric Flint

- Hardback cover of The Rivers of War
- Author: Eric Flint
- Language: English
- Series: Trail of Glory series
- Genre: Alternate history
- Publisher: Del Rey
- Publication date: 2005
- Publication place: United States
- Media type: Print (hardback & paperback) & E-book
- Pages: 528 pp (softcover edition)
- ISBN: 0-345-46568-7 (softcover edition)
- OCLC: 74908064
- Followed by: 1824: The Arkansas War

1812: The Rivers of War is a 2005 alternate history novel by American writer Eric Flint.

The book was originally published in hardcover as simply The Rivers of War. In 2006, the text was made available at the Baen Free Library.

== Plot ==
The story, which takes place in 1814–15, centers around an alternate historical version of the War of 1812. The point of divergence occurs at the Battle of Horseshoe Bend in March 1814, where Sam Houston, who was seriously injured in real history, sustains only a minor injury and is able to continue fighting. This leads to many changes down the line, culminating in the formation of the Confederacy of Arkansas.

== Reception ==
Publishers Weekly gave the book a positive review, stating, "Flint (1632) offers historical figures rarely seen in fiction, such as James Monroe, in pre-Doctrine days, and the British general Robert Ross (not killed outside Baltimore); thorough scholarship in Napoleonic-era warfare; and strong, credible women. Fans will cheer even louder if this outstanding start turns out to be the first of a long saga."

The first published sequel is 1824: The Arkansas War.
