= Thor Meets Captain America =

1986 novelette by David Brin

- Short story by David Brin
- Genre: Science fiction

Publication
- Published in: The Magazine of Fantasy and Science Fiction
- Publication date: July 1986

"Thor Meets Captain America" is a science fiction and alternate history novelette by American writer David Brin. The graphic novel The Life Eaters is based on the story.

The work features an alternate history scenario where the Nazis are winning World War II, following successful use of the occult and enlisting the aid of the Norse pantheon. The protagonists, an American special forces team, are tasked with a risky operation aiming to turn the tides of the war.

== Plot summary ==
Just as World War II began to turn against them, Nazi Germany is suddenly aided by the Norse pantheon. However, Loki joins the Allies, and they prepare a last-ditch sneak attack against Valhalla called Operation Ragnarok. The story follows Captain Chris Turing, who is part of the team which is going to attack Valhalla and starts out with them traveling to their attack destination in a group of submarines hoping that what remained of the United States Surface Navy would be able to distract the Nazi and Norse pantheon forces. Originally the plan was to include only Chris' team and their commando escorts, but Loki informs them that he will accompany his troops to Gotland as well. Due to Loki's previous actions in aiding the Allies and the way he ended the Holocaust by saving the inmates of the concentration camps, Chris agrees and convinces Major Marlowe to allow it.

While waiting for them to get to their destination, Chris recollects his memory of World War II and how the Nazi Germany was about to be defeated by the allied forces until they received the aid of the Norse pantheon. Loki notices Chris and allows the captain to ask the Norse God three questions. Loki answers the questions asked, and in one answer mentions how he does not think that he is older than Chris and also implies that the Nazi extermination camps were established for reasons other than for "Nazi racial purification", but refuses to answer any further questions to clarify this. The group arrives at Gotland, and during the operation Loki disappears as Æsir forces led by Thor defeats the troops.

The survivors of Operation Ragnarok are taken prisoner after the failed mission and are given to Thor by his father Odin. While in custody, Chris recollects more of his memories of World War II and recalls how as a child he wished that he would have an event like the war that he could partake in like his father did. He ends up discussing the history of World War II with his captured troops, and argues with the group about the suggestion the United States should have simply bombed Germany in order to end the war as soon as possible. He also takes an opportunity to mock one of his human captors about how the Nazis have become mere puppets of the Æsir.

After these conversations, Chris is taken to be interrogated by Thor. Thor tries to get Chris to reveal the whereabouts of Loki, but the captive captain does not tell him and does not know. Chris ends up insulting Thor, insisting that they are aliens, and as a result Thor orders his death before revealing that the Norse pantheon were invited "upon the wings of death itself."

Another soldier later explains that Loki the answer to Chris's final question was "necromancy". Chris realizes that the death camps were built not for "racial purification", but for human sacrifices to fuel magic. The captain also realizes that the Norse Gods were created by necromancy due to Loki's admission that he is actually young. After realizing that he has gained superhuman powers from Loki, Chris attacks the guards and dies in an attempt to resist the Norse Gods after managing to destroy Odin's Spear. In doing so, he hopes that his actions will give hope to other heroes who will eventually rise up to overcome the Nazis.

== Reception ==
"Thor Meets Captain America" won the 1987 Locus Award for Best Novelette, and was a finalist for the 1987 Hugo Award for Best Novelette

Paul Kincaid stated that it was a "clever tale" that "attempts to wrest something new from the formula [of Nazi victory]", but that it "fails somehow to rise to the challenge of finding fresh depth and insight in an all too familiar subject."

== Publication history ==
This story was first published in The Magazine of Fantasy and Science Fiction in their July 1986 issue; it was later reprinted in the anthology Hitler Victorious.

=== Author's notes ===
In the author's notes for this story, David Brin records that he was invited by Gregory Benford to write a piece for an alternate history collection, entitled Hitler Victorious, but voiced the opinion that he could not think of a single event which, if altered, would have let the Nazis win the war, and, contrariwise, that they had required a number of lucky breaks to get as far as they did. Benford’s reply was "I bet you could think of some premise that would work, David". This story was the result. Brin also notes in the afterword that he wrote this story as a possible explanation for why the Nazis did "so many horrible, pointless things".
