= 1824: The Arkansas War =

2006 novel by Eric Flint

- Cover of the book 1824: The Arkansas War
- Author: Eric Flint
- Language: English
- Series: Trail of Glory series
- Genre: Alternate history
- Publisher: Del Rey
- Publication date: November 28, 2006
- Publication place: United States
- Media type: Print (hardback & paperback)
- Pages: 427 (hardback edition)
- ISBN: 0-345-46569-5 (hardback edition)
- OCLC: 69734649
- Dewey Decimal: 813/.54 22
- LC Class: PS3556.L548 A6187 2006
- Preceded by: 1812: The Rivers of War

1824: The Arkansas War is a 2006 alternate history novel by American writer Eric Flint.

== Plot summary ==
The story takes place in 1824 and 1825, ten years after 1812: The Rivers of War. The United States, under the influence of Sam Houston, a Special Commissioner for Indian Affairs, has signed a treaty with the southern Indian tribes that establishes a confederacy of chiefdoms in the territory that in our timeline is composed of the state of Arkansas west of the Red River and the state of Oklahoma without the Panhandle, roughly the boundaries of the historical Arkansas Territory. As a result, the tribes of the Southern United States, particularly the Cherokee, have willingly left the Southeastern United States with their wealth and power intact, as opposed to their eventual and devastating forced removal in 1838 in our timeline.

Shortly thereafter, in Louisiana, Henry Crowell, a free black man and one of the officers of the Iron Battalion who won the Battle of the Mississippi, which in the novel was the battle that saved New Orleans from the British in January 1815, offended the local Creole leadership by courting a Creole woman. Slavecatchers waylaid Crowell and castrated him. In revenge, the Iron Battalion mobilized, destroyed the homes of the Creole leadership, and smashed the Louisiana militia who came after them to suppress "servile rebellion" that is later referred to as the "Algiers incident". Shortly afterwards, Crowell and the Iron Battalion moved to Arkansas.

The easternmost chiefdom, Arkansas, is ruled by Patrick Driscol, who is nicknamed the "Laird of Arkansas" and was once the brigade master sergeant under Winfield Scott during the Niagara Campaign. Arkansas banned slavery and quickly became a magnet for freedmen throughout the United States, who are forced to leave their home states by the influence of men like Henry Clay and John C. Calhoun, who make the states pass Freedmen Exclusion Acts.

As the book begins, one such family, the Parker family, leaves Baltimore, Maryland, after the head of the household is killed by a mob of whites. They are stopped on the Ohio River by slavecatchers, who plan to take them before a partial judge, have them declared runaway slaves, and sold into bondage. However, before the slavecatchers can haul the Parkers away, a party of abolitionists, led by John Brown and his brother Solomon Brown, intervenes, and the family is able to continue its journey.

Flag of the "Arkansas Army"

When the Parkers arrive in New Antrim, the capital of Arkansas, they learn that Crowell's bank will lend the family money to start again if the men join the Arkansas Army. Sheffield Parker and his uncle Jem enlist and undergo a rigorous training regimen. Meanwhile, Clay secretly finances an expedition, led by Robert Crittenden, to attack Arkansas. The expedition fails, but Clay uses this failure as a lever to become the new President of the United States after James Monroe. Soon, Houston's wife, Maria, gets accidentally shot by an assassin from Georgia, who was aiming for Houston himself in retaliation for his liberal views on race. Houston and his son Andrew Jackson Houston leave for Arkansas to aid Driscol and Ross in coming war with the United States.

The novel ends in 1825, with the United States going to war against Arkansas (as an AU of the real American Civil War). Meanwhile, a varied group of politicians, led by the losers in the election of 1824, John Quincy Adams and Andrew Jackson, meet to create a new political party that will both oppose and defeat Clay and work for an eventual end to slavery in all states after Clay's presidential term is finished.

== Historical figures appearing in the novel ==
- John Quincy Adams, U.S. Secretary of State and candidate for president in 1824, who, in this timeline, does not win the presidency and, instead, allies himself with Andrew Jackson in opposition to Henry Clay.
- John Brown, abolitionist who, in this timeline, settles in Arkansas and continues his fight for abolition of slavery.
- Julia Chinn, wife of Richard M. Johnson.
- William Cullen Bryant, poet and journalist who, in this timeline, covers both the Crittenden expedition and the Arkansas War.
- John C. Calhoun, U.S. Senator and Secretary of War during the Arkansas War. While Calhoun does not appear "on-stage", his advocacy for the various freedmen exclusion acts, his disdain for the liberal racial policies of the Confederacy of the Arkansas and his desire to crush the Confederacy, and the role he plays in the election of Henry Clay to the presidency makes him one of the most important figures in the novel.
- Henry Clay, Speaker of the House of Representatives and, in this timeline, winner of the presidency in 1824.
- Duwali, Cherokee chief
- William Henry Harrison, U.S. general, who, in this timeline, is tasked with leading an invading army into Arkansas from the east.
- Sam Houston, U.S. official, and, in this timeline, eventual brigadier general in the Arkansas army.
- Andrew Jackson, U.S. senator, who, in this timeline, becomes an ally to John Quincy Adams in opposition to Henry Clay.
- Richard M. Johnson, U.S. senator who, in this timeline, while his African American common-law wife and their school-age children are in Arkansas to continue their education, allies himself with Andrew Jackson and John Quincy Adams in opposition to Henry Clay.
- Josiah Johnston, U.S. politician
- James Monroe, The President of the United States from 1817 to 1825.
- Peter Porter, U.S. politician
- Pushmataha, Choctaw chief
- John Ridge, Cherokee publisher and confederate officer
- Major Ridge, Cherokee leader
- John Ross, Cherokee leader
- Winfield Scott, U.S. general, who, in this timeline, resigns his commission upon the election of Henry Clay and becomes a journalist, reporting on the Arkansas War on the scene.
- Henry Shreve, steamboat entrepreneur who, in this timeline, is part-owner of the steamboat franchise on the Arkansas River serving the Arkansas nation.
- Zachary Taylor, U.S. Army officer, who, in this timeline, is tasked with leading an army that threatens Arkansas from the north.
- Buck Watie, A Cherokee publisher and confederate officer.
- Robert Crittenden, leader of a filibustering expedition into Arkansas. In real history he was Governor of Arkansas Territory in 1828–1829.
- Joseph Totten, U.S. Army engineer who, in this timeline, is a Major in Arkansas service and the commanding officer at Arkansas Post during Crittenden's raid.
- Robert Ross, general of the British Army. In real history, Ross died in 1814, leading an attack on Baltimore, Maryland, but, in this timeline, he survives to become an abolitionist in the United Kingdom, eventually traveling to America where he thinks he can best serve the cause by assisting Arkansas in military matters.
- Charles Ball, General in the Arkansas Army, second-in-command to Driscoll. He was originally a gunner in the U.S. Navy during the War of 1812 and, by fate, ended up serving with distinction under Sam Houston and Patrick Driscoll both at the Battle of the Capitol and at the Battle of the Mississippi. Due to his valor and ability, Andrew Jackson gave him a commission, making him the first African American to become an officer in the U.S. Army.
