= Sidewise Awards for Alternate History =

Prize for alternative history novels

- Official awards logo
- Awarded for: The best English-language works in the alternate history genre
- First award: 1996; 30 years ago
- Website: uchronia.net/sidewise/

The Sidewise Awards for Alternate History are literary awards given to English-language works in the alternate history genre. The awards were first awarded in 1996 for works published in the 1995 calendar year.

== Overview ==
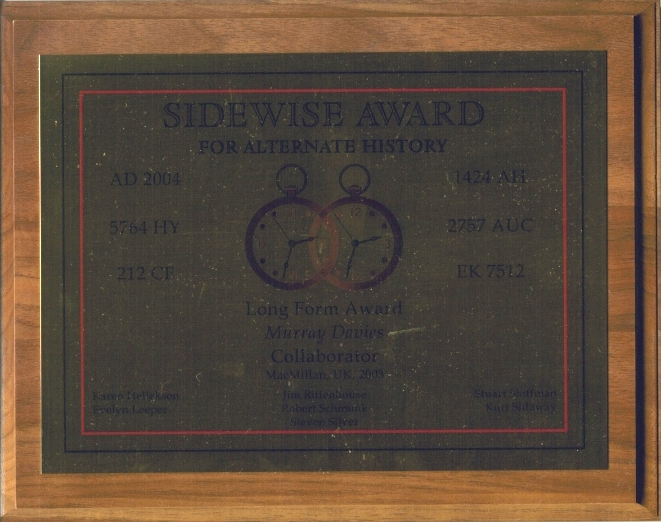
Sidewise Award for Murray Davies's novel Collaborator

The awards take their name from the 1934 short story "Sidewise in Time" by Murray Leinster, in which a strange storm causes portions of Earth to swap places with their analogs from other timelines.

The awards were created by Steven H Silver, Evelyn C. Leeper, and Robert B. Schmunk. Over the years, the number of judges has fluctuated between three and eight and have included judges in the United States, United Kingdom, Canada and South Africa.

Two awards are normally presented each year, usually at WorldCon or at NASFiC. The Short-Form award is presented to a work under 60,000 words in length. The Long-Form award is presented to a work or works longer than 60,000 words, which may include a single novel or a multi-volume series. The judges have five times also recognized an individual with a Special Achievement Award in recognition for works published prior to the award's inception or for other contributions to the genre.

== Winners and finalists ==
Note: The Sidewise Awards are announced as for the year of publication rather than by the year of award presentation.

=== Long Form ===
* Winners

Year	Author	Title	Ref.
1995	Paul J. McAuley*	Pasquale's Angel	
1995	Kim Newman	The Bloody Red Baron	
1995	Richard Dreyfuss	The Two Georges	
1995	Harry Turtledove	The Two Georges	
1996	Stephen Baxter*	Voyage	
1996	Harry Harrison	The Hammer and the Cross	
1996	John Holm	The Hammer and the Cross	
1996	Orson Scott Card	Pastwatch: The Redemption of Christopher Columbus	
1996	Harry Turtledove	Worldwar series	
1997	Harry Turtledove*	How Few Remain	
1997	Michael Swanwick	Jack Faust	
1997	Peter Delacorte	Time on My Hands: A Novel with Photographs	
1998	Stephen Fry*	Making History	
1998	Pamela Sargent	Climb the Wind	
1998	Greg Bear	Dinosaur Summer	
1999	Brendan DuBois*	Resurrection Day	
2000	Mary Gentle*	Ash: A Secret History	
2000	Suzanne Allés Blom	Inca	
2000	S. M. Stirling	Nantucket trilogy	
2001	J. N. Stroyar*	The Children's War	
2001	J. Gregory Keyes	The Age of Unreason	
2001	Allen Steele	Chronospace	
2002	Martin J. Gidron*	The Severed Wing	
2002	Harry Turtledove*	Ruled Britannia	
2002	S. M. Stirling	The Peshawar Lancers	
2002	Christopher Priest	The Separation	
2002	Gary Blackwood	The Year of the Hangman	
2003	Murray Davies*	Collaborator	
2003	S. M. Stirling	Conquistador	
2003	Mitchell Freedman	A Disturbance of Fate	
2003	Larry Kirwan	Liverpool Fantasy	
2004	Philip Roth*	The Plot Against America	
2005	Ian R. MacLeod*	The Summer Isles	
2005	Paul Park	A Princess of Roumania	
2005	Sophia McDougall	Romanitas	
2006	Charles Stross*	The Family Trade	
2006	Charles Stross*	The Hidden Family	
2006	Charles Stross*	The Clan Corporate	
2006	Robert Conroy	1862	
2006	Harry Turtledove	The Disunited States of America	
2006	Jo Walton	Farthing	
2006	Paul Park	The Tourmaline	
2007	Michael Chabon*	The Yiddish Policemen's Union	
2007	Robert Conroy	1945	
2007	Jo Walton	Ha'penny	
2007	Mary Gentle	Ilario: A Story of the First History	
2007	Jay Lake	Mainspring	
2007	Sophia McDougall	Rome Burning	
2008	Chris Roberson*	The Dragon's Nine Sons	
2008	George Mann	The Affinity Bridge	
2008	Jo Walton	Half a Crown	
2008	Terry Pratchett	Nation	
2008	Adam Roberts	Swiftly	
2009	Robert Conroy*	1942	
2010	Eric G. Swedin*	When Angels Wept: A What-If History of the Cuban Missile Crisis	
2010	Adam Chamberlain	Columbia & Britannia	
2010	Brian A. Dixon	Columbia & Britannia	
2010	Jay Lake	Pinion	
2010	Robert Conroy	Red Inferno: 1945	
2011	Ian R. MacLeod*	Wake Up and Dream	
2011	Lavie Tidhar	Camera Obscura	
2011	Robert Conroy	Castro's Bomb	
2011	Ekaterina Sedia	Heart of Iron	
2011	Robert Conroy	Himmler's War	
2011	Ian McDonald	Planesrunner	
2011	Jeff Greenfield	Then Everything Changed	
2012	C. J. Sansom*	Dominion	
2012	Jack McDevitt	The Cassandra Project	
2012	Mike Resnick	The Cassandra Project	
2012	Thomas Brennan	Doktor Glass	
2012	Mark Hodder	Expedition to the Mountains of the Moon	
2012	Matt Ruff	The Mirage	
2013	D. J. Taylor*	The Windsor Faction	
2013	Bryce Zabel*	Surrounded by Enemies: What If Kennedy Survived Dallas?	
2013	Robert Conroy	1920: America's Great War	
2013	Mark Hodder	The Secret of Abdu el Yezdi	
2014	Kristine Kathryn Rusch*	The Enemy Within	
2014	Alexander M. Grace Sr.	Second Front: The Allied Invasion of France, 1942-1943	
2014	Tony Schumacher	The Darkest Hour	
2014	Allen Steele	V-S Day	
2014	Jo Walton	My Real Children	
2015	Julie Mayhew*	The Big Lie	
2015	Tony Schumacher	The British Lion	
2015	Harry Turtledove	Joe Steele	
2016	Ben H. Winters*	Underground Airlines	
2016	Richard Beard	Acts of the Assassins	
2016	Nick Wood	Azanian Bridges	
2017	Bryce Zabel*	Once There Was a Way	
2017	Gregory Benford	The Berlin Project	
2017	Brent Harris	A Time of Need	
2017	Elan Mastai	All Our Wrong Todays	
2017	Alan Smale	The Clash of Eagles trilogy: Clash of Eagles, Eagle in Exile, Eagle and Empire	
2018	Mary Robinette Kowal*	The Calculating Stars	
2018	Hannu Rajaniemi	Summerland	
2018	Charles Rosenberg	The Trial and Execution of the Traitor George Washington	
2018	Lavie Tidhar	Unholy Land	
2019 (Note: The 2019 awards were delayed due to the COVID-19 pandemic. They were presented at the same time as the 2020 awards.)	Annalee Newitz	The Future of Another Timeline	
2019	K. Chess	Famous Men Who Never Lived	
2019	Jared Kavanagh	Walking Through Dreams	
2019	John Laband	The Fall of Rorke's Drift	
2020	Adrian Tchaikovsky	The Doors of Eden	
2020	Dennis Bock	The Good German	
2020	Junior Burke	The Cold Last Swim	
2020	Mary Robinette Kowal	The Relentless Moon	
2020	Charles Rosenberg	The Day Lincoln Lost	
2021	Laurent Binet* (author)	Civilizations	
2021	Sam Taylor* (translator)	Civilizations	
2021	Laura Frankos	Broadway Revival	
2021	Chris Hadfield	The Apollo Murders	
2021	Natasha Pulley	The Kingdoms	
2022	B. L. Blanchard*	The Peacekeeper	
2022	R. F. Kuang	Babel, or the Necessity of Violence	
2022	J. O. Morgan	Appliance	
2022	Kung Li Sun	Begin the World Over	
2022	Harry Turtledove	Three Miles Down	
2022	Josh Weiss	Beat the Devils	
2023	Francis Spufford*	Cahokia Jazz	
2023	Sandra Newman	Julia	
2023	Harry Turtledove	The Wages of Sin	
2023	Josh Weiss	Sunset Empire	
2024	Sophie Burnham*	Sargassa	
2024	Ann Brashares	Westfallen	
2024	Ben Brashares	Westfallen	
2024	M. R. Carey	The Pandominion series: Infinity Gate and Echo of Worlds	
2024	Kyle Palmer	The Last Rival: A Time of Our Choosing	
2025	Vaishnavi Patel*	Ten Incarnations of Rebellion	
2025	James Alistair Henry	Pagans	
2025	R. A. Moss	Tobacco Republic: What If The 13 Colonies Never United?	

=== Short Form ===
* Winners

Year	Author	Title	Ref.
1995	Stephen Baxter*	"Brigantia's Angels"	
1995	David Garnett	"Brute Skill"	
1995	Stephen Dedman	"From Whom All Blessings Flow"	
1995	Maureen McHugh	"The Lincoln Train"	
1995	Harry Turtledove	"Must and Shall"	
1995	Jonathan Lethem	"Receding Horizon"	
1995	Carter Scholz	"Receding Horizon"	
1995	Howard Waldrop	"You Could Go Home Again"	
1996	Walter Jon Williams*	"Foreign Devils"	
1996	Kim Newman	"Abdication Street"	
1996	Eugene Byrne	"Abdication Street"	
1996	William Barton	"Age of Aquarius"	
1996	John Kessel	"The Miracle of Ivar Avenue"	
1996	Mark W. Tiedemann	"Resurrection"	
1997	William Sanders*	"The Undiscovered"	
1997	Lee Allred	"For the Strength of the Hills"	
1997	Roland J. Green	"The King of Poland's Foot Cavalry"	
1997	Kim Newman	"Teddy Bears' Picnic"	
1997	Eugene Byrne	"Teddy Bears' Picnic"	
1998	Ian R. MacLeod*	The Summer Isles	
1998	Howard Waldrop	"US"	
1998	Robert Silverberg	"Waiting for the End"	
1998	Arthur C. Clarke	"The Wire Continuum"	
1998	Stephen Baxter	"The Wire Continuum"	
1999	Alain Bergeron* (author)	"The Eighth Register"	
1999	Howard Scott* (translator)	"The Eighth Register"	
1999	Robert Silverberg	"Getting to Know the Dragon"	
1999	Robert Silverberg	"A Hero of the Empire"	
1999	Jan Lars Jensen	"The Secret History of the Ornithopter"	
2000	Ted Chiang*	"Seventy-Two Letters"	
2000	Eugene Byrne	"HMS Habakkuk"	
2000	Kim Newman	"The Other Side of Midnight: Anno Dracula 1981"	
2000	Paul J. McAuley	"A Very British History"	
2000	Carla Pereira (author)	"Xochiquetzal"	
2000	David Alan Prescott (translator)	"Xochiquetzal"	
2001	Ken MacLeod*	The Human Front	
2001	Stephen Baxter	"First to the Moon!"	
2001	Simon Bradshaw	"First to the Moon!"	
2002	William Sanders*	"Empire"	
2002	John Kessel	"The Invisible Empire"	
2002	Walter Jon Williams	"The Last Ride of German Freddie"	
2002	Charles Coleman Finlay	"We Come Not to Praise Washington"	
2002	Robert Silverberg	"With Caesar in the Underworld"	
2003	Chris Roberson*	"O One"	
2003	Robert L. O'Connell	"The Cuban Missile Crisis: Second Holocaust"	
2003	Ricard de la Casa	"The Day We Went Through the Transition"	
2003	Pedro Jorge Romero	"The Day We Went Through the Transition"	
2003	Geoffrey A. Landis	"The Eyes of America"	
2003	Robert Silverberg	"The Rein of Terror"	
2004	Warren Ellis*	Ministry of Space	
2004	Chris Weston*	Ministry of Space	
2004	Laura DePuy Martin*	Ministry of Space	
2004	John McDaid	"The Ashbazu Effect"	
2004	Sean Klein	"Five Guys Named Moe"	
2004	Lois Tilton	"The Gladiator's War: A Dialog"	
2004	L. Timmel Duchamp	"The Heloise Archive"	
2004	Chris Roberson	"Red Hands, Black Hands"	
2005	Lois Tilton*	"Pericles the Tyrant"	
2005	William Barton	"Harvest Moon"	
2005	A. M. Dellamonica	"The Illuminated Heretic"	
2005	Jason Stoddard	"Panacea"	
2005	Kim Newman	"Prix Victor Hugo Script"	
2005	Paul J. McAuley	"Prix Victor Hugo Script"	
2006	Gardner Dozois*	"Counterfactual"	
2006	Chris Floyd	"History Lesson"	
2006	Andrew Tisbert	"The Meteor of War"	
2006	Maya Kaathryn Bohnhoff	"O Pioneer"	
2006	Stephen Baxter	"The Pacific Mystery"	
2006	Martin Gidron	"Palestina"	
2006	Brian Stableford	"The Plurality of Worlds"	
2007	Michael Flynn*	"Quaestiones Super Caelo Et Mundo"	
2007	Kristine Kathryn Rusch*	"Recovering Apollo 8"	
2007	Jess Nevins	"An Alternate History of Chinese Science Fiction"	
2007	Elizabeth Bear	"Les Innocents/Lumiere"	
2007	Chris Roberson	"Metal Dragon Year"	
2007	John Scalzi	"Missives from Possible Futures #1: Alternate History Search Results"	
2007	Matthew Johnson	"Public Safety"	
2008	Mary Rosenblum*	"Sacrifice"	
2008	Paul J. McAuley	"A Brief Guide to Other Histories"	
2008	Kristine Kathryn Rusch	"G-Men"	
2008	T. L. Morganfield	"Night Bird Soaring"	
2008	Tobias S. Buckell	"The People's Machine"	
2008	Albert E. Cowdrey	"Poison Victory"	
2009	Alastair Reynolds*	"The Fixation"	
2009	Bruce Sterling	"Black Swan"	
2009	Chris Roberson	"Edison's Frankenstein"	
2009	Sarah Zettel	"The Persistence of Souls"	
2009	Paul Di Filippo	"Yes, We Have No Bananas"	
2010	Alan Smale*	"A Clash of Eagles"	
2010	Barry B. Longyear	"Alter Kameraden"	
2010	William F. Wu	"Goin' Down to Anglotown"	
2010	Eleanor Arnason	Mammoths of the Great Plains	
2010	Ken MacLeod	"Sidewinders"	
2011	Lisa Goldstein*	"Paradise Is a Walled Garden"	
2011	Michael Flynn	"The Iron Shirts"	
2011	Harry Turtledove	"Lee at the Alamo"	
2011	Jason Stoddard	"Orion Rising"	
2012	Rick Wilber*	"Something Real"	
2012	Ian Sales	Adrift on the Sea of Rains	
2012	Catherynne M. Valente	"Fade to White"	
2012	Lou Antonelli	"Great White Ship"	
2012	Sean McMullen	"Steamgothic"	
2013	Vylar Kaftan*	"The Weight of the Sunrise"	
2013	Ken Liu	"A Brief History of the Trans-Pacific Tunnel"	
2013	Adam Roberts	"Tollund"	
2013	Kristine Kathryn Rusch	"Uncertainty"	
2013	Harry Turtledove	"Cayos in the Stream"	
2013	Ian Watson	"Blair's War"	
2014	Ken Liu*	"The Long Haul: From the Annals of Transportation, The Pacific Monthly, May 2009"	
2014	Igor Ljubuncic	"The Girl with the Flaxen Hair"	
2014	Robert Reed	"The Principles"	
2014	Aaron S. Rosenberg	"Let No Man Put Asunder"	
2014	Lewis Shiner	"The Black Sun"	
2014	Harry Turtledove	"The More It Changes"	
2015	Bill Crider*	"It Doesn't Matter Anymore"	
2015	Eneasz Brodsky	"Red Legacy"	
2015	Eric Cline	"Elizabethtown"	
2015	Rev Dicerto	"Losing Amelia"	
2015	Ken Poyner	"The Last of Time"	
2015	James Reasoner	"The Hero of Deadwood"	
2016	Daniel M. Bensen*	"Treasure Fleet"	
2016	Adam Rovner*	"What If the Jewish State Had Been Established in East Africa"	
2016	Anna Belfrage	"The Danish Crutch"	
2016	Brent A. Harris	"Twilight of the Mesozoic Moon"	
2016	Ricardo Victoria	"Twilight of the Mesozoic Moon"	
2016	G. K. Holloway	"The Battle of London Bridge"	
2016	Bruce Sterling	Pirate Utopia	
2017	Harry Turtledove*	"Zigeuner"	
2017	Tom Anderson	"N'oublions Jamais"	
2017	Bruno Lombardi	"N'oublions Jamais"	
2017	Dave D'Alessio	"The Twenty Year Reich"	
2017	Nisi Shawl	"Sun River"	
2018	Oscar (Xiu) Ramirez*	Codex Valtierra	
2018	Emmanuel Valtierra*	Codex Valtierra	
2018	Rick Wilber	"The Secret City"	
2019	Harry Turtledove*	"Christmas Truce"	
2019	Seanan McGuire	"Any Way the Wind Blows"	
2019	Christopher G. Nuttall	"Drang Nach Osten"	
2019	Christopher G. Nuttall	"The Kaiserin of the Seas"	
2019	William Stroock	"The Blue and the Red: Palmerston's Ironclads"	
2020	Matthew Kresal*	"Moonshot"	
2020	Andrew J. Harvey	"1827: Napoleon in Australia"	
2020	Sean McMullen	"Wheels of Echoes"	
2021	Alan Smale*	"Gunpowder Treason"	
2021	Matt Kresal	"Hitchcock's Titanic"	
2021	Rick Wilber	"Billie the Kid"	
2022	Eric Choi*	"A Sky and a Heaven"	
2022	Wole Talabi*	"A Dream of Electric Mothers"	
2022	Michael Cassutt	"Kingsbury 1944"	
2022	Paul Levinson	It's Real Life	
2022	Gillian Polack	"Why the Bridgemasters of York Don't Pay Taxes"	
2023	Rosemary Claire Smith*	"Apollo in Retrograde"	
2023	Mark Ciccone	"To-to-Toe"	
2024	L. Briar*	"A Brother's Oath"	
2024	Mark Ciccone	Les Mariannes	
2024	Elektra Hammond	"Apart from That Mrs. Lincoln"	
2025	Alan Smale*	"Caesar at Sea"	
2025	Lee Allred	"Two If by Seekrieg"	
2025	Kelli Fitzpatrick	"The Leavitt Space Telescope"	
2025	Alan Smale	"Darwin's Rocket"	

=== Special Achievement ===
1995 – L. Sprague de Camp, lifetime achievement
1997 – Robert Sobel, For Want of a Nail
1999 – Randall Garrett, the Lord Darcy series
2018 – Eric Flint, for support of writers in the alternate history genre, most notably via the 1632 series
2025 – Ronald D. Moore — For bringing alternate history to television through For All Mankind and Star City
