= 1945 (disambiguation) =

1945 was a year in the 20th century that saw the end of World War II.

1945 may also refer to:

- 1945 (Gingrich and Forstchen novel), a 1995 novel by Newt Gingrich and William Fortschen
- 1945 (Conroy novel), a 2007 novel by Robert Conroy
- 1945 (EP), a 1994 EP by Soul-Junk
- 1945 (2017 film), a 2017 Hungarian film
- 1945 (2022 film), a 2022 Indian film

== See also ==
- Red Inferno: 1945, book by Robert Conroy
- Holland, 1945, song by Neutral Milk Hotel
