= Cultural depictions of George Armstrong Custer =

George Armstrong Custer (1839–1876) was a United States Army cavalry commander in the American Civil War and the Indian Wars. He was defeated and killed by the Lakota, Northern Cheyenne, and Arapaho tribes at the Battle of the Little Bighorn. More than 30 movies and countless television shows have featured him as a character. He was portrayed by future U.S. president, Ronald Reagan in Santa Fe Trail (1940), as well as by Errol Flynn in They Died With Their Boots On (1941).

== Paintings ==
In 1896, Anheuser-Busch commissioned from Otto Becker a lithographed, modified version of Cassilly Adams' painting Custer's Last Fight, which was distributed as a print to saloons all over America. It is reputed to still be in some bars today. Edgar Samuel Paxson completed his painting Custer's Last Stand in 1899. In 1963 Harold McCracken, director of the Buffalo Bill Historical Center, deemed Paxson's painting "the best pictoral representation of the battle" and "from a purely artistic standpoint...one of the best if not the finest pictures which have been created to immortalize that dramatic event."

== Films ==
- Custer's Last Fight (1912) - with Francis Ford as Custer.
- Colonel Custard's Last Stand (1914) - with Lloyd Hamilton as Colonel Custard.
- Britton of the Seventh (1916) - with Ned Finley as Custer.
- Bob Hampton of Placer (1921) - with T. D. Crittenden as Custer.
- Wide Open Spaces (1924) - with Al Forbes as Custer.
- The Flaming Frontier (1926) - with Dustin Farnum as Custer.
- General Custer at Little Big Horn (1926) - with John Beck as Custer.
- The Last Frontier (1932) - with William Desmond as Custer.
- The World Change (1933) - with Clay Clement as Custer.
- Custer's Last Stand (1936) - with Frank McGlynn as Custer.
- The Plainsman (1936) - with John Miljan as Custer.
- Santa Fe Trail (1940) - with Ronald Reagan as Custer.
- They Died with Their Boots On (1941) - with Errol Flynn as Custer.
- Warpath (1951) - with James Millican as Custer.
- Bugles in the Afternoon (1952) - with Sheb Wooley as Custer.
- Sitting Bull (1954) - with Douglas Kennedy as Custer.
- Tonka (1958) - with Britt Lomond as Custer.
- The Great Sioux Massacre (1965) - with Philip Carey as Custer. The film depicts Custer as a bastion of tolerance whose efforts to secure fair treatment for the Indians leads to several confrontations with corrupt government officials.
- The Plainsman (1966) - with Leslie Nielsen as Custer.
- Custer of the West (1967) - Robert Shaw depicts Custer as an Indian sympathizer, having disagreements with his superiors about fighting the Indians, but duty-bound as an officer of the U.S. Cavalry to enforce orders given to him.
- The Legend of Custer (1968) - with Wayne Maunder as Custer.
- Little Big Man (1970) - The film depicts Custer, played by Richard Mulligan, as a ruthless megalomaniac who massacres Indians in this revisionist Western.
- Don't Touch The White Woman! is a 1974 French/Italian absurd "Western" set in Paris, with a farcical portrayal by Marcello Mastroianni as a vain and bumbling General George Armstrong Custer.
- Crazy Horse and Custer: The Untold Story (1990) - with Wayne Maunder as Custer.
- Son of the Morning Star (1991) - with Gary Cole as Custer.
- Class of '61 (1993) - with Josh Lucas as Custer.
- Crazy Horse (1996) - with Peter Horton as Custer.
- Stolen Women: Captured Hearts (1997) - with William Shockley as Custer.
- Night at the Museum: Battle of the Smithsonian (2009) - with Bill Hader playing Custer as a museum piece brought to life (along with other historical characters and museum pieces) and leads a charge against the villains. He is portrayed as a born leader but bumbling and unintelligent.
- The Ridiculous 6 (2015) - with David Spade playing Custer, seen attending a gambling game alongside Mark Twain (portrayed by Vanilla Ice).

== Television ==
- Whit Bissell portrayed Custer in the 1957 episode "The Broken Pledge" of Cheyenne.
- Custer was portrayed by Grant Williams in "Longhair", a 1959 episode of the TV series Yancy Derringer, in which he wrongly accused series regular Pahoo (a Pawnee) of several attempts on Custer's life during a visit to New Orleans.
- Barry Atwater played Custer in a two-part episode of the TV series Cheyenne, broadcast in 1960. The first part was titled, "Gold, Glory and Custer - Prelude"; the second was titled "Gold, Glory and Custer — Requiem".
- Custer was portrayed on the television series F Troop in 1965 by John Stephenson.
- Custer appeared in a 3-part episode of the 1965-66 TV series Branded titled "Call to Glory". He was portrayed by Robert Lansing.
- Custer was featured an episode of the 1966 TV show Time Tunnel titled "Massacre". He was portrayed by Joe Maross.
- Custer was a short-lived 1967 television series starring Wayne Maunder in the title role. The 17 episodes have been re-issued on DVD.
- Custer was portrayed by James Olson in the teleplay The Court-Martial of George Armstrong Custer (1977)
- Custer was played by Andrew Garringer (in a walk-on role) in the TV miniseries North and South (1986).
- Custer was played by Gary Cole in the two-part 1991 TV film Son of the Morning Star.
- Custer was a recurring character on the TV series Dr. Quinn, Medicine Woman, a 1990s TV drama. He was first played by Taylor Nichols in the episode "Epidemic", Darren Dalton in "The Prisoner" and by Jason Leland Adams in "The Abduction", "Washita" and "For Better or Worse".
- Custer was portrayed by Jonathan Scarfe on the mini-series Into the West (2005).
- Custer was played by Toby Stephens in the 2007 BBC documentary series The Wild West.
- Custer was played by David Spade in the 2015 Netflix film The Ridiculous 6.
- Custer was played by John C. Bailey in the 2016 AMC mini-series The American West.
- Custer was played by Christopher Backus in the final episode of the TV series Hell on Wheels (2011–2016).

== Literature ==
- Custer appears as a prominent minor character in Flashman and the Redskins – the seventh of George MacDonald Fraser's Flashman novels – in which Flashman unwillingly becomes caught up in the Battle of the Little Bighorn after being captured by Lakota warriors.
- The 1964 novel Little Big Man by Thomas Berger has Custer as a secondary character. The novel was the basis for the 1970 film by Arthur Penn.
- Custer Died for Your Sins, a 1969 book by Vine Deloria, Jr., with its title derived from a bumper sticker slogan, covers Custer and American relations with Indians in general.
- American author Michael Blake wrote his historical novel Marching To Valhalla as a first-person diary of Custer.
- Custer and the battle of the Little Bighorn are featured in Złoto Gór Czarnych (Gold of the Black Hills), a trilogy of novels told from the perspective of the Santee Dakota tribe, by Polish author Alfred Szklarski and his wife Krystyna Szklarska.

=== Alternate history ===
The mythic quality of Custer's life has made him a popular subject for several alternate history stories.

- Custer at the Alamo is an alternate history novel by Gregory Urbach. Sent 40 years in the past by a spell cast by Chief Sitting Bull, George Armstrong Custer and the 7th Cavalry join Davy Crockett to defend the Alamo against Mexican forces under the command of General Antonio Lopez de Santa Anna.
- In the "Fallen Cloud Saga," a series of five novels by Kurt R.A. Giambastiani, George Armstrong Custer survives an alternate campaign against the Plains Indians, becomes President of the United States, and confronts his own son as the two sides battle toward a resolution.
- The Court-Martial of George Armstrong Custer, a novel by Douglas C. Jones, is set in an alternate history built on the premise that George Armstrong Custer did not die at the Battle of Little Bighorn. Instead, he was found close to death at the scene of the defeat and was brought to trial for his actions. Blending fact and fiction, the novel portrays what might have happened at that trial. It was made into a TV movie in 1977 with James Olson as Custer and Blythe Danner as his wife Libbie.
- The short story "Custer's Last Jump" by Howard Waldrop and Steven Utley is set in a steampunk version of the Sioux War that takes as its point of divergence the introduction of aircraft during the Civil War.
- In Harry Turtledove's Southern Victory Series alternate history novels, the Little Bighorn did not take place, and Custer is a full colonel in Kansas in 1881, chasing Indians and then doing battle with rebel Mormons in Utah Territory and joining Theodore Roosevelt's "Unauthorized Regiment" in order to defeat an Anglo-Canadian column invading Montana during the Second Mexican War, becoming a war hero. Eventually, Custer becomes the commanding general of the US First Army in the Great War, fighting against the Confederates. Despite failing many times, he brings about the war's first breakthrough using tanks. After the war, he is appointed as governor of Occupied Canada and then forced into retirement under a new administration. He later dies in 1930.
- In the short story "How the South Preserved the Union" by Ralph Roberts in the anthology "Alternate Presidents" edited by Mike Resnick, George Custer was elected president in or prior to 1888. He is named as the victor at the Battle of the Little Big Horn (June 25–26, 1876).
- In the novel "1882: Custer in Chains" by Robert Conroy, Custer survives and wins the Battle of Little Big Horn. As a result, he is elected president in 1880 and later provokes a war with Spain two years later after a ship heading to Cuba is massacred.
- Wes Anderson satirizes such portrayals of Custer-as-survivor in his film The Royal Tenenbaums, in which the character Eli Cash writes a book called “Old Custer".
- In the collection of short alternate history stories Drakas!, Custer became persona non grata after refusing to lead troops against apparently overwhelming Indian forces. Drummed out of the military in America, he responded to the invitation of an old associate to go to Africa where the Draka empire was looking for experienced field officers.
- In Percival Everett's novel God's Country, Custer is portrayed as a cross-dressing homosexual who eats raw meat.
- A 1960 episode of Peabody's Improbable History has the General surviving the battle. When his boy Sherman questions Peabody about this historical twist, the dog points out a vendor's pushcart as being the actual Custer's Last "Stand".
- In the alternate history short story Bloodstained Ground by Brian Thomsen in the anthology Alternate Generals edited by Harry Turtledove, Roland J. Green and Martin H. Greenberg, George Armstrong Custer survives and wins the Battle of Little Big Horn and is eventually elected as the President of the United States, only to later be assassinated. Following Custer's death, journalist Samuel Clemens is assigned to write a memorial, but his interviews with Custer's nephew Henry Armstrong Reed and Captain Marcus Reno reveal some sickening facts about Custer.

== Music ==
- Custer is one of only two Army officers to be referenced in the army song (the other is George Patton), whose lyrics were written in 1956.
- The first and probably best-known Custer pop song was "Mister Custer" ("Please Mister Custer, I don't wanna go"), a Billboard #1 novelty hit of 1960 for performer Larry Verne, in which "a voice from the rear" of the Seventh Cavalry charge asks "What'm I doing here?" and "Mind if I be excused the rest of the afternoon?" The song's words and music were by Fred Darian, Al DeLory, and Joe Van Winkle. In the UK, it was successfully covered by Charlie Drake.
- Custer is prominently featured in Johnny Horton's 1960 song "Jim Bridger": "He spoke with General Custer and said 'Listen Yellow Hair/'The Sioux are a great nation, so treat 'em fair and square/'Sit in on their war council, don't laugh away their pride'/But Custer didn't listen, and at Little Big Horn Custer died."
- The Kingston Trio recorded a song on their 1963 album The New Frontier titled "Some Fool Made A Soldier Of Me". The song's final verse has a trooper complaining of thirst to "General Custer", who retorts "...have no fear/There's a big river near."
- On Johnny Cash's 1964 album Bitter Tears, the song "Custer" mocks the popular veneration of George Custer. A truncated version of the song has been covered in concert by Buffy Sainte-Marie as "Custer Song".
- Influential American punk/alternative band The Minutemen mocked Custer's defeat and questioned the dignity - or lack thereof - in which he died during the Battle of the Little Bighorn, on the title track of their 1981 LP The Punch Line: "I believe when they found the body of General George A. Custer/Quilled like a porcupine with Indian arrows/He didn't die with any honor, dignity, or valor/I believe when they found the body of George A. Custer/American general, patriot, and Indian fighter/That he died with shit in his pants."
- The 1983 satirical song "I Love America", in which Alice Cooper portrays a stereotypical American as naïve and ignorant (even when it comes to his own country's history), includes the lyrics "I love what the Indians did to Custer".
- General Custer's legacy was memorialized by the Italo disco group Swan in their 1986 hit "General Custer".
- The Native American rock band Redbone recorded the song "Custer Had It Coming" in 1989.
- A 1991 album, Blazon Stone, by the German Heavy metal band Running Wild, includes a song about Custer's final battle called "Little Big Horn". It starts with the words "Hey Mr. Custer, why did you dare the hand of fate?"
- The Arrogant Worms's 1995 song "History Is Made by Stupid People" mocks him with the line "General Custer's a national hero, for not knowing when to run."
- On his 1996 album Cowboy Celtic, Canadian singer David Wilkie sang "Custer Died A-Runnin'".
- In the 1997 song "Banner Year", ska band Five Iron Frenzy blames the death of Black Kettle, at the Battle of Washita, on Custer. "Where Custer shot and killed Black Kettle."
- The 1999 song Bulimic Beats by the Indie rock band Catatonia includes the line "A front line with labels where I witness custard's last stand".
- American composer and musicologist Kyle Gann created a multimedia work titled Custer and Sitting Bull in which monologues by the two figures are recited, accompanied by a microtonal musical score and projected images from the time period. The piece premiered in Los Angeles in 1999 and played in New York to positive reviews in the year 2000.
- The rapper Nelly mentioned Custer in his song "Heart of a Champion" from his 2004 album Sweat: "My last stance be a stance of a General Custer, I hot dog cause I can, I got the cheese and mustard."
- A 2004 album, Stripping Cane, by singer/songwriter Jeffrey Foucault, includes a song called "Pearl Handled Pistol". It mentions G.A. Custer and Buffalo Bill: "He was a mighty handsome man. He loved dogs and children, he loved the military band."
- In the 2009 Dave Matthews Band song "Little Red Bird" off their bonus disc to Big Whiskey and the GrooGrux King, Custer is mentioned in the second verse. "General Custer is sad / Overestimated his abilities to win / Sitting Bull turned the table on him / A comfort to count the battles won after the war is lost / Little red bird".
- In 2013, underground rapper Will $teel of the hip-hop group Kush Klan released a tribute song titled "General Custer"
- Experimental-pop group Perky Custer derived their name from General George Custer and a generic version of Dr Pepper.
- Corb Lund's song "Horse Soldier, Horse Soldier" refers to Custer and the Battle of Little Bighorn in its first verse.

== Video games ==
- A controversial adult video game known as Custer's Revenge was published for the Atari 2600. This game consisted of Custer, depicted nude save for a cowboy hat and boots and with a visible erection, moving from the left hand side of the screen to the right hand side of the screen through a barrage of arrows emerging from the top of the screen, in order to rape a Native American woman who is tied to a pole.
- In the game Duke Nukem: Zero Hour, the level Fort Rosewell features Custer as an enemy of the protagonist.
- In Age of Empires III: The WarChiefs, Custer makes an appearance but is seen as a stubborn leader who declares war on the Sioux. In the end, the player defeats him and his army with help from the Sioux.
- In the game Darkest of Days, the player starts out as a member of the 7th Cavalry with Custer at Little Big Horn. The player is saved by a time-travel organization just as Custer is killed in the background.
- In Angry Video Game Nerd Adventures, George Armstrong Custer appears as the boss of the level Beat It & Eat It, a level parodying various Atari Porn games.
