= 1862 (disambiguation) =

1862 may refer to

- The year 1862
- 1862 (novel)
- Flight El Al Flight 1862
