= 1901 (disambiguation) =

1901 is a year in the 20th century.

1901 may also refer to:

- 1901 BC, a year in the 20th century BC
- 1901 (number), a number
- 1901 (song), a song by Phoenix
- 1901 (novel), a novel by Robert Conroy
