= Red Inferno =

Red Inferno may refer to:

- Red Inferno: 1945, an alternate history World War II war novel by Robert Conroy
- Red Inferno, a DC Comics character
- Red Inferno, an alternate name for Galeona Rossa, a French-Maltese galleon captured by Murat Reis the Elder
