= 1945 (Conroy novel) =

2007 novel by Robert Conroy

- Cover of the first edition
- Author: Robert Conroy
- Language: English
- Genre: Alternate history
- Publisher: Ballantine Books
- Publication date: May 29, 2007
- Publication place: United States
- Media type: trade paperback
- Pages: xi, 432 pp.
- ISBN: 978-0-345-49479-5
- OCLC: 74916045
- Dewey Decimal: 813/.54 22
- LC Class: PS3553.O51986 A617 2007

1945 is an alternate history novel by Michigan economics professor Robert Conroy, an author of alternate history novels, such as 1901 and 1862. It was first published in trade paperback and ebook form by Ballantine Books in May 2007. In the novel's point of divergence, the Kyūjō coup successfully suppresses Japanese Emperor Hirohito's order to surrender and so World War II in the Pacific continues into 1946.

== Plot ==
In August 1945, following the atomic bombings of Hiroshima and Nagasaki and the Soviet invasion of Manchuria, a battalion of rogue Imperial Japanese Army officers and troops led by Major Kenji Hatanaka seize the Imperial Palace to prevent the surrender of Japan. They persuaded the war minister, General Korechika Anami, to join the coup and gain support from the rest of the Japanese military. Rather than staying loyal to Emperor Hirohito, as in actual history, Anami orders the imprisonment of Hirohito and establishes himself as the de facto dictator of Japan.

Anami's refusal to surrender leads US President Harry Truman to order Army Chief of Staff General George Marshall to launch Operation Downfall, the Allied invasion of Japan. In preparation for the invasion, a third atomic bomb is dropped on Kokura, destroying the city. To deter further atomic attacks, Anami orders the transfer of Allied POWs to cities of strategic importance, prompting the United States to suspend the atomic bombing campaign. The OSS recruit the Japanese American veteran Joe Nomura to head into Nagasaki under the guise of a Japanese officer to investigate the effects of the nuclear blast. Based on his reports of the radiation effects, the US military's intention of using tactical nuclear warheads is abandoned as too dangerous for their own troops.

In Okinawa, General Douglas MacArthur begins the first phase of Operation Downfall, the invasion of Kyushu (codenamed Olympic), followed by an invasion of Honshu (codenamed Coronet) with the ultimate goal of capturing Tokyo. Though initially set back by the typhoon season, Allied forces eventually secured a landing on Kyushu on X-Day, despite suffering heavy losses from Japanese guerilla warfare, kamikaze tactics, Kairyu submarines, and Kaiten human torpedoes.

Meanwhile, Nomura aids an American POW, Dennis Chambers, who escaped from a Japanese POW camp near Nagasaki in the confusion of the atomic bombing. With his aid, Nomura impersonates a Kempeitai officer and investigates a heavily guarded camp in Nagasaki, unaware that it houses Hirohito.

MacArthur is killed via a kamikaze on the command vessel USS Augusta. General Omar Bradley assumes command of the operation with Matthew Ridgway as his subordinate while a fourth atomic bomb is ordered by General Curtis LeMay on a loose interpretation of standing orders from President Truman to be dropped on the Kanmon Straits, destroying several Japanese divisions. Back in the homefront, civil disorder occurs in the US in response to the news of the sinking of RMS Queen Elizabeth. Meanwhile, the Red Army invades and occupies Japanese Korea in order to aid the Chinese Communist Party against the Kuomintang during the Chinese Civil War.

Nomura learns that Hirohito is held captive in Nagasaki, and when his superiors are made aware, Bradley authorizes Nomura, Chambers, and a squad of US Army Rangers to extract Hirohito, escape Japan, and bring him to an aircraft carrier to meet Truman. Aware of Hirohito's declaration to surrender to the Allies, a countercoup, led by General Masaharu Homma and Admiral Jisaburō Ozawa, assassinates Anami and accepts the surrender of Japan in January 1946, despite failing to prevent a successful Japanese counter-offensive against Allied positions in Kyushu.

In the aftermath, Operation Downfall cost an additional 150,000 Allied casualties. Hirohito is reinstated as emperor and Japan's transition to democracy begins. Despite the Kuomintang's defeat and retreat to Taiwan, the Chinese Communist Party and Soviet Union fail to secure a Sino-Soviet alliance. The Soviets abandon the Korean Peninsula, which likely leads to a Korean unification and the prevention of a Korean War.

With the Soviet economy recovering from the previous war and its sphere of influence dwindling in East Asia, the ensuing Cold War will see the U.S at a significant advantage.

== Literary significance and reception ==
Booklist said that "realistic to the point of gruesomeness, 1945 recalls David Westheimer's classic Death Is Lighter than a Feather." Publishers Weekly said that Conroy explored the carnage of war through various viewpoints with "moving and thought provoking results".
