= Eric G. Swedin =

American novelist

- Born: Eric Gottfrid Swedin
- Occupations: Professor, writer
- Writing career
- Language: English
- Period: 2003–present
- Genres: Alternate history, science fiction
- Subjects: History, technology
- Notable work: When Angels Wept: A What-If History of the Cuban Missile Crisis
- Notable awards: Sidewise Award (2010)
- Website: swedin.org

Eric G. Swedin is an American author of science fiction and academic nonfiction works. He is a professor of history at Weber State University in Utah. Swedin is the 2010 long form winner of the Sidewise Award for his alternate history novel When Angels Wept: A What-If History of the Cuban Missile Crisis. He was a consultant for the Emmy Award-winning documentary, Clouds Over Cuba, which was created for the John F. Kennedy Presidential Library and Museum.

== Biography ==
Swedin is a professor of history at Weber State University in Utah. He has written several non-fiction textbooks and academic works, as well as five novels, and his books and papers have been cited in over 70 academic works. He won the Sidewise Award for his 2010 alternate history novel, When Angels Wept: A What-If History of the Cuban Missile Crisis. He was a consultant on two documentaries about the Cuban Missile Crisis: Clouds Over Cuba, which won an Emmy Award, and What If...? Armageddon 1962, a documentary which aired on the Military Channel in 2014.

== Bibliography ==
=== Nonfiction ===
- Healing Souls: Psychotherapy in the Latter-day Saint Community (2003, University of Illinois Press, ISBN 0-252-02864-3)
- Science in the Contemporary World: An Encyclopedia (2005, part of the History of Science series, ABC-CLIO, ISBN 1-85109-524-1)
- Science Fiction and Computing: Essays on Interlinked Domains (2011, McFarland & Company, ISBN 978-0-7864-4565-3, as editor with David L. Ferro)
- Survive the Bomb: The Radioactive Citizen's Guide to Nuclear Survival (2011, Zenith Press, ISBN 978-0-7603-4031-8, as editor)

Essays

- "Murray Leinster and 'A Logic Named Joe'" (2011, with David L. Ferro, in Science Fiction and Computing: Essays on Interlinked Domains, McFarland & Company, ISBN 978-0-7864-4565-3)
- "Rebooting 'A Logic Named Joe': Exploring the Multiple Influences of a Strangely Predictive Mid-1940s Short Story" (2011, with David L. Ferro, in Science Fiction and the Prediction of the Future: Essays on Foresight and Fallacy, McFarland & Company, ISBN 978-0-7864-5841-7)

=== Fiction ===
- The Killing of Greybird (2004, CFI, ISBN 1-55517-767-0)
- When Angels Wept: A What-If History of the Cuban Missile Crisis (2010, Potomac Books, ISBN 978-1-59797-517-9)
- Anasazi Exile (2011, Borgo Press/Wildside Press, ISBN 978-1-4344-4403-5)
- Fragments of Me (2012, Borgo Press/Wildside Press, ISBN 978-1-4344-4515-5)
- Seeking Valhalla (2013, Borgo Press/Wildside Press, ISBN 978-1-4794-0071-3)

== Documentaries ==
Swedin consulted on Clouds Over Cuba and consulted on and appeared in What If...? Armageddon 1962.

- Clouds Over Cuba (2012, created by and aired at John F. Kennedy Presidential Library and Museum) This program won an Emmy Award for "New Approaches: Documentaries".
- What If...? Armageddon 1962 (2014, Military Channel)
