= 1942 (novel) =

2009 novel by Robert Conroy

- Author: Robert Conroy
- Language: English
- Genre: Alternative history
- Publisher: Ballantine Books
- Publication date: February 24, 2009
- Publication place: United States
- Pages: 368
- ISBN: 978-0-345-50607-8

1942 is an alternate history novel written by Robert Conroy. It was first published, as an e- book, by Ballantine Books on February 24, 2009, with a hardcover edition following from the same publisher in March 2009. The novel won the 2009 Sidewise Award for Alternate History.

== Plot ==
In the wake of an attack on Pearl Harbor that is far more successful than in reality, the novel depicts a fictitious Japanese invasion and conquest of Hawaii in late 1941 and the ensuing struggle by the United States to regain the islands in 1942.

== See also ==
- Days of Infamy series
