= Adam Chamberlain =

English author

Adam Chamberlain (born 8 January 1972) is an English author based in London. He was awarded the internal Shell/The Economist Writing Prize in 2003 for his essay "Beyond Nature," an investigation of mankind's relationship with the natural world, and later lectured on the contents of that essay. He has since published short fiction in addition to work on plays and screenplays. Columbia & Britannia, an alternate history anthology Adam Chamberlain edited with Brian A. Dixon, was nominated for the 2010 Sidewise Award for Alternate History. Chamberlain and Dixon are also the editors of Back to Frank Black (2012), a volume of original essays and interviews celebrating Chris Carter's Millennium.
