= Famous Men Who Never Lived =

2019 novel by K. Chess

Famous Men Who Never Lived is a 2019 science fiction novel by American author K. Chess, about refugees. It was first published by Tin House.

== Synopsis ==
In early 2019, a portal to an alternate timeline opened in New York City, and 156,000 refugees came through, fleeing nuclear war.

Three years later, Helen "Hel" Nash is one of the refugees (now known as "Universally Displaced Persons", or "UDPs"), obsessively researching historical events in an attempt to learn how the two timelines diverged and planning a museum of her lost world's culture. Meanwhile, her partner Vikram tries to assimilate.

== Reception ==
Famous Men Who Never Lived was a finalist for the 2019 Sidewise Award.

The Verge considered it a "powerful story of accepting one's fate by putting one foot in front of the other, day by day", and declared that it is "more effective" because it has "no grand, overarching plan to try to fix Hel's world with the help of an intrepid group of scientists." The A.V. Club found that it "more closely resembles Behold the Dreamers" than Fringe, and noted that it has "little action and few explanations of the science that makes the plot possible".

Tor.com observed that the novel "never felt appropriative of anybody's story", stating that it is "a meditation on grief and the preservation of culture, rather than a plot-driven page-turner", and drawing parallels with Station Eleven.

Publishers Weekly was less positive, describing it as "confused" and with a "narrative [that] frequently loses momentum", and calling the multiple excerpts from The Pyronauts — a classic science fiction novel from the UDPs' timeline, of which only Vikram's copy now exists — "unnecessary", but nonetheless conceded that the story has a "good premise" and "part of [it] has a satisfactory conclusion". Kirkus Reviews similarly praised the book's "promising concept, (with) much (...) to enjoy", with "obvious—but not belabored—commentary on the immigrant experience in the United States", but judged the characters to be "underdeveloped", and found that Hel's failure to notice that the copy of The Pyronauts has gone missing until weeks later, "strains credulity". Lambda Literary commended the "funny, interesting, and sympathetic characters", "inventive and compelling narrative", "empathetic and fine-tuned commentary on displacement", and "meticulous (almost overwhelmingly so sometimes)" worldbuilding, but found the plot "is somewhat complex and at times feels like it is attempting to accomplish too much", with the passages from The Pyronauts "convolut[ing] the plot more than they help it ".
