= The Day After Gettysburg =

Alternate history novel written by Robert Conroy

- First edition
- Author: Robert Conroy and J. R. Dunn
- Cover artist: Kurt Miller
- Language: English
- Genre: Alternate history
- Publisher: Baen Books
- Publication date: August 6, 2017 (Ebook and hardcover versions); June 26, 2017 (Paperback version)
- Publication place: United States
- Media type: Ebook, hardcover and paperback

The Day After Gettysburg is an alternate history novel written by Robert Conroy. It was published by Baen Books online as an ebook and hardcover book on June 6, 2017 and then released a paperback version a few weeks later on June 26. As Conroy had died in late 2014, two and a half years before the book was published, it was released posthumously with author J. R. Dunn finishing and releasing it.

== Plot ==
After being defeated at the Battle of Gettysburg in July 1863, Confederate General Robert E. Lee does not retreat across the Potomac River and his eventual surrender at Appomattox. He instead turns the tables on Union General George Meade with a vicious counterattack that sets the Union Army on its heels.
