= The Children's War =

Novel by J.N. Stroyar

- Author: J.N. Stroyar
- Language: English
- Genre: Alternate history
- Publisher: Pocket Books
- Publication date: 2001
- Publication place: United States
- Media type: Print (hardback & paperback
- Pages: 1168 pp (hardcover)
- ISBN: 0-7434-0739-3 (hardcover edition) & ISBN 0-7434-0740-7 (paperback edition)
- OCLC: 45556219
- Dewey Decimal: 813/.6 21
- LC Class: PS3569.T7366 C48 2001

The Children's War is a 2001 alternate history novel by J.N. Stroyar. It was followed by the sequels A Change of Regime and Becoming Them. The book was the long form winner of the Sidewise Award for Alternate History in 2001.

== Background ==
The point of divergence happens in 1941 when Adolf Hitler's astrologer convinced him that attacking the Soviet Union was a bad idea and the German nuclear weapons program saw better progress. Fifty years later, the truce between Nazi Germany, the Soviet Union, and the North American Union is still holding. The main character, Peter Halifax, finds himself betrayed by the British underground and forced into a life as a slave to a Nazi household, but later escapes to the Polish resistance.

== Characters ==
- Peter Halifax/Alan Yardley (aliases for Niklaus Adolf Chase)
- Richard Traugutt (alias for Ryszard Przewalewski)
- Zosia Król
- Karl Vogel
- Elspeth Vogel
- Julia Hoffmeier
- Katerina Kalischer

== Literary critique ==
The Bradenton Herald described The Children's War as "a brutal look at what might have been and a reminder of the price of freedom."

== See also ==
- Axis victory in World War II

The above page includes an extensive list of other Wikipedia articles regarding works of Nazi Germany/Axis/World War II alternate history.
