= Rising Sun (Conroy novel) =

2012 novel by Robert Conroy

- First edition
- Author: Robert Conroy
- Language: English
- Genre: Alternate history
- Publisher: Baen Books
- Publication date: December 4, 2012
- Publication place: United States
- Media type: Ebook, hardcover and paperback

Rising Sun is an alternate history novel written by Robert Conroy. It was published by Baen Books as a hardcover book on December 4, 2012 and then was released online as an ebook 11 days later on December 15, 2012 before being published as a paperback book on October 29, 2013.

== Plot ==
In World War II during the summer of 1942, Japan wins the Battle of Midway. Two of the United States' handful of carriers in the Pacific blunder into a Japanese submarine picket line and are sunk, while a third is destroyed the next day. The single United States Navy carrier remaining in the Pacific opposes nine Japanese ones, while the ragtag remnants of U.S. battleships – an armada still reeling from the defeat at Pearl Harbor in the December of the previous year – are in even worse shape.

Japan now controls nearly the entire Pacific Ocean. Soon afterwards, Japan invades Alaska and blockades Hawaii. Ship traffic soon clogs the Panama Canal while towns and cities on the West Coast of America are subjected to bombing raids.

Despite these disasters, the U.S. begins to fight back against the Japanese. Limited counterattacks by the Americans are made and a grand plan is put forth to lure the Japanese into an ambush that could restore the balance in the Pacific and give the American forces a fair fighting chance.

== Reception ==
Booklist called it "thrilling", and noted that "familiarity with actual events is a bonus but not a requirement".
