= Robert Conroy =

American author of alternate history novels (1938–2014)

Joseph Robert Conroy (August 24, 1938 – December 30, 2014) was an American author of alternate history novels.

== Life ==
After he got an MBA, Conroy was a professor at Macomb Community College and taught business and economic history.

Following his early retirement, Conroy first became interested in alternate history after studying recently discovered Imperial German plans for the invasion of the United States by Kaiser Wilhelm II, which formed the basis for his first novel, 1901. He then wrote other alternative history novels during his semiretirement.

Married for over 40 years, he had one daughter and two grandchildren.

On December 30, 2014, Conroy died from cancer.

== Bibliography ==
=== Novels ===
- 1901 (1995), ISBN 978-0891418436, his first novel, deals with an Imperial German invasion of Long Island when William McKinley is President.
- 1862 (2006), ISBN 978-0345482372, is based on what might have happened had the United Kingdom entered into the American Civil War on the side of the Confederacy after an actual international incident in which that did not happen.
- 1945 (2007), ISBN 978-0345494795, a scenario in which the Empire of Japan refuses to surrender following the atomic bombings of Hiroshima and Nagasaki, forcing the United States to launch Operation Downfall.
- 1942 (2009), ISBN 978-0345506078, which won the Sidewise Award for Alternate History, tells of the Japanese conquest of Hawaii after the attack on Pearl Harbor is far more successful than actually happened.
- Red Inferno: 1945 (2010), ISBN 978-0345506061, deals with a war between the Western Allies and the Soviet Union following the controversial move by the Allies towards Berlin. The move is tragically misunderstood by Joseph Stalin, who becomes determined to seize all Europe, resulting in a Third World War.
- Castro's Bomb (2011), ASIN B005ORV3IM, (e-book, audio book only. No print release) depicts Fidel Castro seizing control of Soviet nuclear bombs during the Cuban Missile Crisis.
- Himmler's War (2011), ISBN 978-1451637618, deals with what might have happened if Hitler had been killed in 1944, and leadership of Nazi Germany had passed to Himmler, who then adopts a considerably different strategy.
- North Reich (2012) ASIN B008BVXZXO (e-book only), considers if the UK had surrendered to Germany in World War II, and had a fascist regime installed across the Commonwealth and Empire, with Canada becoming a base from which Germany prepares to launch a war against the United States.
- Rising Sun (2012), ISBN 978-1451638516, is set in the aftermath of a Japanese victory at the Battle of Midway, in which Japan launches an invasion of Alaska and conducts carrier-based airstrikes against the West Coast of the United States.
- 1920: America's Great War (2013), ISBN 978-1451639315, in which the United States remained neutral during World War I, resulting in victory that leaves Germany in control of most of Europe. Germany then uses Mexico as a base to launch an invasion of the United States.
- Liberty 1784: The Second War for Independence (2014), ISBN 978-1476736273, depicts the aftermath of a British victory in the American Revolutionary War and the last stand of the remaining uncaptured American founders in what would have been Chicago, which has been renamed Liberty.
- 1882: Custer in Chains (2015), ISBN 978-1476780511, depicts George Armstrong Custer surviving and winning the Battle of Little Big Horn. As a result, he is elected president in 1880 and two years later provokes a war with Spain and its decaying empire after an incident involving an American ship being massacred near Cuba.
- Germanica (2015), ISBN 978-1476780566, Joseph Goebbels prolongs World War II by building a German redoubt in the Alps.
- Storm Front (2015), ISBN 978-1476780870, Conroy's last book and his only non-alternate history work. This novel is about a small town in Michigan which is hit by an unexpected and record-setting blizzard. The townspeople must survive the storm and deal with other threats, the most serious of which is two violent escaped convicts.
- The Day After Gettysburg (2017), ISBN 978-1481482516, published posthumously and completed by J. R. Dunn, retells the events after the famous battle.
- Interregnum (2018), published posthumously, tells the story of a post-nuclear war North America.

=== Critical studies and reviews of Conroy's work ===
1882: Custer in Chains

- Sakers, Don (November 2015). "The Reference Library". Analog Science Fiction and Fact. 135 (11): 105–108.
