= Germanica =

2015 novel by Robert Conroy

- First edition
- Author: Robert Conroy
- Cover artist: Kurt Miller
- Language: English
- Genre: Alternate history
- Publisher: Baen Books
- Publication date: August 16, 2015 (Ebook version); September 1, 2015 (Print version)
- Publication place: United States
- Media type: Ebook, hardcover and paperback

Germanica is an alternate history novel written by Robert Conroy. It was published by Baen Books online as an ebook on August 16, 2015 before being published as a physical book on September 1, 2015. As Conroy had died eight months before the book was published, it was released posthumously.

== Plot ==
Deep in the Alps, the Nazi German propaganda master Joseph Goebbels leads a battalion of zealots called Germanica to hold out against the Allies' frantic final push to end World War II in Europe.

With British Prime Minister Winston Churchill losing the 1945 election, Charles De Gaulle consolidating his rule over a newly-liberated France and Joseph Stalin asserting Soviet occupation of Eastern Europe, only the United States, led by its untried new president, Harry S. Truman, remains to face the toughest Nazi warriors, who hunker down for a bitter fight to the last man.
