= Brian A. Dixon =

American author, primarily of short fiction

Brian A. Dixon (born April 19, 1980) is an American author, cultural studies scholar, and media critic. His first published short story, "The McMillen Golf Penalty," was awarded the Shannon Searles Fiction Prize by Connecticut Review in 2002. He has since published short fiction in a number of outlets in addition to work on plays and novels. As a scholar, he has written and edited books and essays on cultural studies, with a focus on fiction, television, and film.

== Biography ==
Dixon was born in Connecticut in 1980. He was educated at the University of Rhode Island, where he received his MA (English) and PhD (English), completing a dissertation on representations of the human body in the novels of Ian Fleming. He studied under literary scholar Josie P. Campbell and was the Assistant Editor of ATQ: The American Transcendental Quarterly. His scholarly research focuses on cultural studies and media, exploring ideas related to genre studies, adaptation studies, and canon formation with an emphasis on narrative in fiction, television, and film.

In addition to his work as a scholar, Dixon has also established himself as a writer of fiction. His debut short story, "The McMillen Golf Penalty," earned the Shannon Searles Fiction Prize from Connecticut Review. He has since published short fiction in various genres, including historical fiction, alternate history, speculative fiction, magical realism, and mystery.

Dixon is the author of the Dick Byrne mysteries, an ongoing series of detective stories featuring an expert arson investigator working in Washington, DC. Murder mysteries featuring Byrne have featured in Alfred Hitchcock's Mystery Magazine and Havok. Byrne’s debut, "The Black Box," was recognized as one of the thirty Best Private Eye Stories of the Year 2026 by editors S. J. Rozan and Michael Bracken.

Dixon was the editor of Revelation (2003-2012), an independent literary magazine publishing apocalyptic fiction, as well as Matchlight Mystery (2026-present), publishing classic and contemporary detective fiction. Columbia & Britannia (2009), an alternate history anthology edited by Brian A. Dixon and Adam Chamberlain, was nominated for the 2010 Sidewise Award for Alternate History. Dixon and Chamberlain are also the editors of Back to Frank Black (2012), a volume of original essays and interviews celebrating Chris Carter's Millennium.

== Bibliography ==
=== Books ===
- Sex for Dinner, Death for Breakfast: James Bond and the Body (Fourth Horseman Press, 2025)

=== Edited Books ===
- Figures of Freedom: Representations of Agency in a Time of Crisis, with Randy Laist (Fourth Horseman Press, 2024)
- Back to Frank Black: A Return to Chris Carter's Millennium, with Adam Chamberlain (Fourth Horseman Press, 2012)
- Columbia & Britannia: An Alternate History, with Adam Chamberlain (Fourth Horseman Press, 2009)
