= Liberty 1784: The Second War for Independence =

2014 novel by Robert Conroy

- Author: Robert Conroy
- Cover artist: Kurt Miller
- Language: English
- Genre: Alternate history
- Publisher: Baen Books
- Publication date: March 4, 2014
- Publication place: United States
- Media type: Hardcover and paperback
- Pages: 368
- ISBN: 978-1476736273

Liberty 1784: The Second War for Independence is an alternate history novel written by Robert Conroy. It was published by Baen Books on March 4, 2014.

== Plot ==
The point of divergence occurs in 1781 by General George Washington's attempt to trap the British forces under General Cornwallis at the Battle of Yorktown ending catastrophically for the Continental Army since the French fleet is destroyed at the Battle of the Chesapeake. The American Revolutionary War soon collapses, and the British regain control over their colonies and begin a new bloody reign of terror. Washington is brought back to London and is executed for treason. A group of rebels flees westward and sets up a colony in the sparsely populated Northwest Territory near what is now Chicago, and calls it Liberty. The British, looking to finish off the rebels, send a very large force under John Burgoyne to destroy them. He is desperate for redemption, and the Americans are equally desperate to survive.
