= Castro's Bomb =

Alternative history novel

- First edition
- Author: Robert Conroy
- Language: English
- Genre: Alternate history novel, thriller
- Published: September 21, 2011
- Publication place: United States
- Media type: Ebook

Castro's Bomb is an American alternate history ebook written by Robert Conroy. It was first published on Kindle on September 21, 2011.

== Plot ==
In 1963, a year after the Cuban Missile Crisis, the leader of Cuba, Fidel Castro, and the Cuban Army use weapons left behind by the Soviet Union to seize the United States military base at Guantanamo Bay and then plan missile strikes against America. US President John F. Kennedy tries desperately to retain his leadership and to keep the war from escalating into World War III.

== Reception ==
Castro's Bomb was a finalist for the 2012 Sidewise Award, Long Form. Blaine Pardoe considered it to have "huge gaps".
