= Columbia & Britannia =

2009 story anthology

- Author: Edited by Adam Chamberlain and Brian A. Dixon
- Cover artist: Cyril van der Haegen
- Language: English
- Genre: Alternate History
- Publisher: Fourth Horseman Press
- Publication date: 2009
- Publication place: United States, United Kingdom
- Media type: Print (Hardcover & Paperback)
- Pages: 406
- ISBN: 0-615-33327-3

Columbia & Britannia is a 2009 anthology of alternate history stories edited by Adam Chamberlain and Brian A. Dixon. Each of the stories in the anthology takes place in a shared timeline, a world in which the American Revolutionary War never took place. Published by Fourth Horseman Press, the book was nominated for the 2010 Sidewise Award for Alternate History.

== Setting ==
The Point of divergence occurs in 1766, when William Pitt proposes the Columbia Compromise, a set of laws that serves to establish a framework for North American representation in Parliament. The American Revolutionary War never takes place and British North America becomes an integral part of an expanding British Empire. Each of the anthology's stories is set against a significant historical occurrence along this timeline, exploring the effects of events including, among others, the publication of Thomas Paine's Common Sense, a Southern revolt against the Slavery Abolition Act 1833, the English Decadent movement, New York's British Empire Exhibition, a British Moon landing, and the War of Wars fought between the United Kingdom and Germany.

== Contents ==
- Brian A. Dixon: "Intolerable Acts"
- Joe Tangari: "Total Emancipation"
- Mark Beech: "The Thunderbird"
- C. Mitchell O’Neal: "All the Jungle is Thine”
- Alexander Zelenyj: "Here Grow No Flowers"
- Adam Chamberlain: "Flag Day"
- Joe Tangari: "The Sun Yet Sets"
- Brian A. Dixon: "The Last Day of the Old World"
- Adam Chamberlain: "The Twelfth Man"
