= Lee at the Alamo =

Short story by Harry Turtledove

- Short story by Harry Turtledove
- Illustrator: John Jude Palencar
- Country: United States
- Language: English
- Genre: Alternate history

Publication
- Publication type: Online
- Publisher: Tor books
- Publication date: September 7, 2011

Lee at the Alamo is an alternate history short story by Harry Turtledove. It was published online at tor.com on September 7, 2011.

== Plot summary ==
The story begins with the point of divergence in December 1860 by General David E. Twiggs being unable to take command of the Department of Texas, which leaves Lieutenant-Colonel Robert E. Lee as the commander. The story itself is set in February 1861, shortly after the state of Texas voted to secede from the United States to join the Confederacy, to March 1861. Lee concludes that it is his duty to defend U.S. Army munitions and property in San Antonio, Texas, including the fabled Alamo, rather than to allow their surrender to the seceding Texas government, as Twiggs did in real life. That leads to a Second Battle of the Alamo.

Lee is forced to surrender to Benjamin McCulloch after several weeks of siege but becomes a national hero. After Virginia eventually secedes, US President Abraham Lincoln is able to convince Lee to stay in the Union's service by agreeing to send him west, where he will not be fighting against his fellow Virginians.

== Award nomination ==
"Lee at the Alamo" was nominated for a Sidewise Award for Alternate History in 2012.
