= Once There Was a Way =

2017 alternative history novel by Bryce Zabel

- First edition (publ. Diversion Books)
- Author: Bryce Zabel
- Language: English
- Publication date: 2017

Once There Was a Way is a 2017 alternative history novel by Bryce Zabel. It speculates what would have happened if the rock band, The Beatles, had stayed united for years after the date of their actual dissolution and disbanded years later on amicable enough terms with each other with frequent reunions later on.

The novel won the Long Form Sidewise Award for Alternate History in 2017.

== Plot ==
The divergent point is when Johnny Carson was persuaded to host The Tonight Show episode with Paul McCartney and John Lennon after all, instead of Joe Garagiola in 1968, which in real life went poorly. Instead, the episode goes so well that an after-show drinking session that the musicians had a pleasant later conversation with Carson and Ed McMahon that convinces them of the need to show up for their commitments.

In that spirit, the Beatles manage to compromise about their manager situation with Lord Richard Beeching coming on board as an executive at Apple Corp, who mediates the talent managers Allen Klein, for most of the Beatles, and The Eastmans, for McCartney. With Beeching's influence, a "Grand Bargain" is reached with the Beatles able to pursue their individual careers as long as they produce a Beatles album each year. In addition, other matters work out well such as McCartney deciding that his wife, Linda McCartney, could sit in on recording sessions if Lennon's, Yoko Ono, has that privilege, and the wives reach an agreeable rapport with each other.

This arrangement works well enough with successful albums, such as Everest (the original title for Abbey Road) is the result of a combination of studio recordings and live performances at the 1969 Woodstock Festival where they appeared. The internal tensions are present and serious: McCartney and Lennon have their mutually insulting songs "Too Many People" and "How Do You Sleep?" Klein inspires the whole band to record a whole album together where they air their grievances in song one by one to each other in a well-received album called Saville Rowe, which includes other songs like George Harrison's "Wah Wah", allowing for some emotional relief with the musical catharsis.

In addition, the band is kept together through other commitments such as starring in a well-received film adaptation of The Lord of the Rings directed by Stanley Kubrick, and a later caper film, The Hot Rock. Lennon is still involved in politics, attracting the enmity of both the Nixon Administration and a radical cell of the Weather Underground. Meanwhile, Yoko becomes frustrated at John's dissolute behavior and comes to encourage him to collaborate with the Beatles more closely to give his life a stabilizing focus. As for George, The Concert for Bangladesh charity he organized with the whole band participating becomes a major success that fully establishes him as a full creative equal to Paul and John in the public eye to his satisfaction. While Richard Nixon falls in the Watergate Scandal, that Weatherman cell kidnaps Lennon for ransom. The band is frantic to help Lennon, but their best assistance comes when George Harrison meets Steve Jobs while on a spiritual retreat in India. The computer expert devises a complex social networking arrangement to correlate information as to Lennon's location, enabling his rescue. As a result, Lennon significantly increases his personal and the band's security, which prevents Mark David Chapman from murdering him in 1980.

After that, the Beatles agree to finally disband on good terms in 1975, with a farewell concert in Central Park However, Lennon eventually convinces the band to frequently reunite for concert tours, with a combination of their now predominately older audiences becoming more sedate without the constant Beatlemania shrieking, and better performance technology to make performing most of their song catalogue practical, with Eric Clapton joining the band at Harrison's insistence shortly before his death in 2001 from lung cancer. In addition, Jobs is appointed the head of Apple's moribund electronics division and he develops it into a massive electronics company, making the Beatles, along with being deeply impressed with his vision of technology, all billionaires along the way.
