= Bryce Zabel =

American television producer, director, and writer

- Born: May 17, 1954 (age 72)
- Occupations: Television actor; director; producer; writer
- Known for: Atlantis: The Lost Empire; Animal Armageddon; M.A.N.T.I.S.
- Spouse: Jackie Zabel

Bryce H. Zabel (born May 17, 1954) is an American television producer, director, writer, and occasional actor. With hundreds of hours of produced film and television credits, Zabel has scripted a trio of mini-series which aired in the U.S. He also coauthored a book titled AD: After Disclosure, with prominent UFOlogist Richard Dolan. His mini-series include the medical thriller Pandemic (2007, Hallmark), the pirate adventure Blackbeard (2006, Hallmark), and the disaster epic The Poseidon Adventure (2005, NBC).

== Education ==
Zabel attended Hillsboro High School in Hillsboro, Oregon. He earned a Bachelor of Arts degree in Broadcast Journalism at the University of Oregon in Eugene. After graduation, Zabel stayed in Eugene and worked at television station KVAL-TV and radio station KZEL-FM. As an adjunct professor, he taught a graduate-level class on Producing at the University of Southern California (2006–07). He was also a CNN correspondent.

== Career ==
In television, Zabel was showrunner (creator or developer/producer/writer) on the UFO-conspiracy series Dark Skies from 1996 to 1997, The Crow: Stairway to Heaven from 1998 to 1999, and the Fox African-American superhero series M.A.N.T.I.S. from 1994 to 1995. He also wrote and produced on Lois & Clark: The New Adventures of Superman (1993–1994), and The Fifth Corner (1992). Zabel was the lead writer and a producer on 2009's Animal Armageddon, an eight-part non-fiction miniseries for Animal Planet. It deals with mass extinction events. The screenplay written by Bryce and Jackie Zabel, Miles From Nowhere completed filming in Los Angeles in the summer of 2008. It is the story of a high school athlete who decides to try for a sub-four-minute mile to deal with the death of a friend. The film stars Treat Williams.

As a feature film writer, Zabel has received writing credit on Mortal Kombat Annihilation (1997) and Atlantis: The Lost Empire (2001). He also wrote the first SyFy ("Sci-Fi Channel"" at the time) original TV film, Official Denial (1993).

A long-time member of the Directors Guild of America, he first worked as a director on the Los Angeles magazine series "Eye on LA" and Willow: The Making of an Adventure. He made his feature directorial debut in 2009 on Let's Do It, a comedy about the first student film ever produced, back in 1929.

As an actor, he appeared as a reporter in the Dark Skies episode "The Warren Omission", and as a priest in the Lois & Clark episode, "All Shook Up".

In 2001, Zabel became the first writer/producer to be elected as chairman and CEO of the Academy of Television Arts & Sciences, since his boyhood idol Rod Serling. Elected the month before 9/11, he took office at a time when he was forced to twice postpone the 53rd Primetime Emmy Awards. In 2006, he was interviewed about this decision by the Dallas-based Media Orchard :

"In 2001, the Emmys were scheduled for September 16th. So we cancelled them. What else could we do? Five days after 9/11 nobody was going to be in a self-congratulatory mood to celebrate on red carpets with little gold statues when thousands had died so tragically. We re-scheduled for October 7. Incredibly, that's the day the bombing campaign in Afghanistan began. We were forced to cancel again. I went out that morning before some 200 TV cameras with Les Moonves of CBS and we talked to the media about all this. I got a call from a friend who said, "Dude, you've been on TV more this weekend than the president." It was an amazing media carpet ride -- appearances on everything from Politically Incorrect to The Today Show. Anyway, we tried again on November 4 and actually did the show. We were up against the seventh game of an exciting World Series but who cared?"

While leading the TV Academy the next year, he led the negotiations that resulted in the Emmy telecast license fee being increased by 250 percent. He left office in 2003, saying his one term was so eventful it felt like two.

=== Other work ===
Zabel has also created a film review site, Movie Smackdown, that reviews two related films in competition against each other. The slogan is "Two Films - One Review - No Holds Barred."

Zabel co-authored with Richard Dolan the book A.D. (After Disclosure) 2012, which concerns the subject of an extraterrestrial presence on Earth covertly interacting with humans and governments and what develops when this fact is made public.

=== Awards and nominations ===
In 2008, Zabel's Hallmark miniseries Pandemic (co-written with Jackie Zabel) won the Writers Guild of America award in the Original Long Form category. It was the third WGA award Zabel has been nominated for and his first win. Previously, he was nominated for Episodic Drama (L.A. Law; "Justice Swerved") and Original Long Form (Dark Skies; "The Awakening"). His other nominations were shared with David E. Kelley and Brent V. Friedman. Zabel was also nominated for an Edgar Allan Poe award for Best Television Episode (L.A. Law; "Justice Swerved") in 1991. The nomination was shared with David E. Kelley.

In 2014, his novel, Surrounded by Enemies: What If Kennedy Survived Dallas? (originally marketed under the title Winter of Our Discontent), shared the Sidewise Award with D.J. Taylor's The Windsor Faction. Zabel won a second Sidewise Award in 2018 for his novel Once There Was a Way.

== Personal life ==
Zabel is married to writer and producer Jackie Zabel, whom he met during a news conference in the office of the mayor of Los Angeles. They have three children, including Jared and Lauren.
