= Himmler's War =

2011 novel by Robert Conroy

- First edition
- Author: Robert Conroy
- Language: English
- Genre: Alternate history
- Publisher: Baen Books
- Publication date: December 1, 2011 (Ebook version); December 6, 2011 (Print version)
- Publication place: United States
- Media type: Ebook, hardcover and paperback

Himmler's War is an alternate history novel written by Robert Conroy. It was published by Baen Books online as an ebook on December 1, 2011, before being published in print five days later.

== Plot ==
About a month and a half after the start of the Normandy landings, an American bomber drops its ordnance on a random target, which just happens to contain Adolf Hitler, who is killed. With Hitler dead, Reichsführer-SS Heinrich Himmler assumes control of Nazi Germany. For the Allies, there is confusion on whether attempts should be made to negotiate with the new government, or Germany should be forced into an unconditional surrender.
