= 1920: America's Great War =

2013 alternate history novel by Robert Conroy

- Cover of 1st edition
- Author: Robert Conroy
- Cover artist: Kurt Miller
- Language: English
- Genre: Alternate history
- Publisher: Baen Books
- Publication date: November 15, 2013
- Publication place: United States
- Media type: Hardcover
- Pages: 354 pp.
- ISBN: 978-1-4516-3931-5
- OCLC: 857568231

1920: America's Great War is an alternate history novel by the Michigan economics professor Robert Conroy. It was first published as an ebook by Baen Books in November 2013. A hardcover edition followed in December of the same year and then a paperback edition in March 2015. The novel depicts a fictional world in which Imperial Germany had emerged victorious early in World War I and launches a surprise invasion of the United States in 1920 from Mexico. The book's premise is based on an actual plan that Germany had proposed to Mexico during the war.

== Plot ==
The novel's prologue sets the point of divergence in early September 1914 in which in the First Battle of the Marne, the German Army overwhelms the French and pushes on to capture Paris, and France surrenders. The 300,000-strong British Expeditionary Force is stopped by the Germans before it can reach a Mediterranean port in which the Royal Navy could have evacuated it and so surrenders. The Allies sign the Treaty of Princeton, which ends the War of 1914 (World War I in our timeline) with the Central Powers victorious.

The novel then jumps to the summer of 1920 in the United States. U.S. President Woodrow Wilson is praised for acting as a mediator to end the European war and decides to run for a third term in the 1920 election despite being bedridden. Thinking that a lasting peace had been achieved, he enacted strong isolationist policies and cut the budget for the US military. The impression proves illusory. German Emperor Wilhelm II views the United States as the only remaining nation that can threaten Germany and prepares for war. He aids the revolutionary forces of Venustiano Carranza in overthrowing the government of Mexico, which then becomes a German ally. The plan is to launch a joint German-Mexican surprise invasion into the Southwestern United States to gain America's vast natural resources for Germany and recover territory lost to the United States in the 19th century for Mexico.

When Woodrow Wilson dies in his sleep, and U.S. Vice President Thomas R. Marshall steps down since he considers himself unequal to the responsibility of the presidency, Secretary of State Robert Lansing is sworn in as president instead. Aware of the invasion threat, Lansing has the US military desperately mobilize a defense, which comes too little and too late as the German Army crosses the Mexican border into California, and the Mexican Army crosses the Rio Grande into Texas.

As a result of Wilson's military budget cuts, the US Army is poorly trained and equipped and so is easily overrun. German saboteurs cut vital railroad links and telegraph lines and sever most communication between the Southwest and the rest of the country. San Diego and Los Angeles fall into German hands, and the Mexicans burn Laredo and Brownsville. The Imperial German Navy's Pacific Fleet blockades West Coast ports, bombards coastal towns, and traps the US Navy's fleet in San Francisco Bay and Puget Sound. Forced to retreat north, the Americans destroy the refineries of the Los Angeles City Oil Field to deny fuel to the enemy's mechanized army units and the blockade fleet, which slows down the invasion. Meanwhile, the Texas Rangers and the National Guard fight a brutal defensive trench war that significantly impedes the Mexicans.

As the US Army forces in California fortify San Francisco, and the American public rallies to raise more troops to repel the invaders, a coalition of European nations wishing to reduce German influence (composed of the United Kingdom, France, Spain, Portugal, Sweden, and Italy) quietly smuggle weapons, equipment, and military advisers to the US through Canada. From the fall of 1920 to the winter of 1921, the Germans slowly advance to San Francisco as a belated flu epidemic kills nearly a million people across the country. The Americans strike back by sinking German resupply freighters with submarines and repulse the Mexican advance after a bloody ″Second Battle of the Alamo.″ A re-equipped US Army under John J. Pershing drives the Mexicans back across the border. Carranza is assassinated by Pancho Villa, and Mexico falls into chaos until Alvaro Obregon takes over and asks Lansing for a status quo antebellum. Lansing agrees to the prewar borders if the US Army receives the right of passage through Mexican territory westwards so that it can retake California from the Germans.

On the eve of battle for San Francisco, General Nolan is killed by German stormtroopers, and Ike Eisenhower is promoted to lead the defense of the city. The German Army finally reaches San Francisco and begins a brutal siege led by Kaiser Wilhelm II's son, Crown Prince Wilhelm. The German Navy blockade ships enter San Francisco Bay to assist but are surprised by an aerial bombardment of US Army Air Corps biplanes, led by Colonel Billy Mitchell and flown by civilian volunteers like Amelia Earhart. As the remaining ships flee the San Francisco Bay, they are engaged in ship-to-ship battle with the remaining battleships of the US Navy's Pacific Fleet, led by the battleships USS Arizona, the USS Pennsylvania, and the USS Nevada. The battle ends in a stalemate as German battleships SMS Koenig and SMS Thuringen are sunk, and the SMS Bayern runs aground, while the Nevada is sunk, the Arizona is beached, and the Pennsylvania is badly damaged.

The US Army reinforcements reach San Francisco just as the city defenses are overrun and before the Germans' new massed stormtrooper force can take the city, a surprise American counterattack by American troops utilizing smuggled British tanks crashes through their troop formations. The German Army retreats, and Crown Prince Wilhelm is killed by a sniper. The invasion force is eventually cornered in Monterey Bay by US forces from San Francisco and from Pershing's force from the south. The Germans eventually surrender.

Meanwhile, in Russia, Leon Trotsky leads a second revolution that causes Tsar Nicholas II to flee to Germany. To capture him, the newly formed Soviet Union launches a massive invasion of German-ruled Poland and East Prussia. Humiliated by the defeat in the United States and mourning the loss of his eldest son, Kaiser Wilhelm II steps down. his second son, Prince Eitel Friedrich, takes over and sues for peace with the United States so that he can fight the Soviets. Lansing agrees but forces Germany to pay reparations. The novel ends as peace is negotiated, and Lansing discusses with Winston Churchill the possibilities for the new weapons that were used in the war.

== See also ==
- Imperial German plans for the invasion of the United States
