= 1882: Custer in Chains =

2015 novel by Robert Conroy

- Author: Robert Conroy
- Cover artist: Kurt Miller
- Language: English
- Genre: Alternate history novel
- Published: May 5, 2015
- Publisher: Baen Books
- Publication place: United States
- Media type: Print (Hardcover and Paperback)
- Pages: 374
- ISBN: 978-1476780511

1882: Custer in Chains is an American alternate history novel written by Robert Conroy. It was first published on May 5, 2015.

== Plot ==
The point of divergence occurs during the Great Sioux War of 1876 by George Armstrong Custer surviving and defeating Sitting Bull and the Sioux at the Battle of the Little Bighorn.

Custer's victory over the Native Americans results in him becoming popular enough to run successfully for President in the 1880 presidential election.

Two years later, Custer finds himself bored and seeks new worlds to conquer. He and his wife Libbie fixate on the decaying Spanish Empire as his source for immortality. He fails to understand that the American military is not up to such a venture.

When a group of Americans on a ship headed for Cuba is massacred, a war against Spain could be on the horizon because of the incident.
