= 1901 (novel) =

1995 alternate history novel by Robert Conroy

- Cover of the first edition
- Author: Robert Conroy
- Language: English
- Genre: Alternate history novel
- Published: June 1995 (Lyford Books)
- Publisher: Lyford Books (1995); Ballantine Books (2004 reissue)
- Publication place: United States
- Media type: Print (Hardcover)
- Pages: 374
- ISBN: 0-89141-537-8
- OCLC: 54090035

1901 is an alternate history novel by Robert Conroy. It was the first novel by Conroy, a retired business and economic Michigan professor.

It was first published in hardcover by Lyford Books in June 1995; a Science Fiction Book Club edition followed in August of the same year and then a paperback edition from Presidio Press in 2004. The novel depicts a fictitious German invasion of the United States in 1901, shortly after William McKinley begins his second term as US President.

The plot is based on an actual diplomatic crisis that nearly brought the United States and the German Empire into war during the early 20th century. Conroy was inspired by the publication of the actual German invasion plans.

== Plot ==
In 1901, the United States is still basking in its victory in the Spanish–American War only three years earlier. However, the US Army is small, and its only large forces are occupying the newly won possessions of the Philippines and Cuba.

The German Kaiser, Wilhelm II, tries to purchase the US acquisitions to compete with the British Empire. After it is refused, Germany declares war on the US and begins to invade it.

The Germans land troops on the southern shore of Long Island, New York. They soon take Brooklyn, and Manhattan quickly falls, which soon allows German forces to cross into Connecticut.

US President William McKinley is overwhelmed, suffers a heart attack, and dies, which results in US Vice President Theodore Roosevelt becoming the new president. Roosevelt begins to retrieve the situation by recalling several generals and giving their command to former comrades from Cuba, including Generals Leonard Wood, John J. Pershing, and Frederick Funston. However, the first major battle against the Germans is lost, and the scattered US Atlantic Fleet is also unable to respond.

The United Kingdom quietly furnishes the poorly-equipped Americans with modern firearms and ammunition.

The Americans slowly recover from the initial shock. At sea, the USS Alabama encounters and sinks three German cruisers that are bombarding Jacksonville, Florida. Meanwhile, in Connecticut, an American brigade, led by Funston, ambushes a German patrol and inflicts heavy casualties. The victories lift American morale, but the war soon turns into a stalemate.

The Germans create a defensive perimeter between the Hudson River and the Housatonic River and fortify Central New York State. General Nelson Miles attacks the German positions along the Housatonic, in the fashion of the American Civil War, but is defeated.

Roosevelt decides that the US must become a full-fledged military power if victory is to be achieved. He replaces Miles with the 80-year-old former Confederate General James Longstreet and calls General Arthur MacArthur, Jr., from the Philippines to take command of the US Army in the field.

Meanwhile, US Army Indian Scouts and other operatives disrupt German lines. At sea, the US Navy launches surprise attacks against German convoys in the English Channel and, closer to the American coast, sinks empty transports returning to Germany. The stalemate continues, but the attacks hurt German morale.

US Navy torpedo boats and the submarine Holland then disable three enemy vessels, reduce the German fleet from sixteen to thirteen available battleships, and nearly cut the German supply line. The German high command sends a massive convoy across the Atlantic Ocean, with both reinforcements and supplies, in the hope of trapping the American fleet. The German plan fails, and the convoy is destroyed.

The German Army prepares for a massive ground offensive in the hope to break the American line and turn the American right flank. After a massive artillery barrage, the Germans drive the Americans back, tear a large gap through the American line, and force the US troops to fall back. Then, a force of four brigades appears – hastily dispatched colonial soldiers from the Philippines – driving in the Germans' exposed flank and capturing the high command.

News of the naval and military defeats reaches Germany, and a revolt breaks out that overthrows Wilhelm II and places his son, Wilhelm III, on the throne, as a puppet ruler. The new German government sues for peace and ends the war.

While the Americans celebrate their victory over the invaders, Germany's new ruling junta (calling themselves the "Third Reich"), decides that the idea of a colonial empire was foolish, and instead plans to expand Germany's Lebensraum across Eastern Europe, with the Jews and Slavs seen as expendable.
