= 1862 (novel) =

2007 novel by Robert Conroy

- Cover of first edition
- Author: Robert Conroy
- Language: English
- Genre: Alternate history
- Publisher: Ballantine Books
- Publication date: June 2006
- Publication place: United States
- Media type: Print (Paperback)
- Pages: 410 pp.
- ISBN: 0345482379
- OCLC: 64279922

1862 is an alternate history novel by Robert Conroy. It was first published in paperback by Presidio Press/Ballantine in June 2006 and as an ebook by Presidio on December 18, 2007.

The novel depicts an alternative version of the American Civil War in which the United Kingdom allies with the Confederacy after the Trent Affair. In our timeline, cooler heads prevailed after the seizure of the RMS Trent by Union forces, with the British retaliating only diplomatically by recognizing the Confederacy as a belligerent, instead of merely being in rebellion.

== Plot ==
In late 1861, the United Kingdom gets involved in the American Civil War on the side of the Confederacy in the wake of the Trent Affair. In early 1862, the Union attempts to win a decisive victory against the Confederacy before British reinforcements arrive in the Americas at the Battle of Culpeper but fail miserably because of the horrible leadership of George B. McClellan. However, after numerous defeats for the Anglo-Confederate Alliance and losing Robert E. Lee and most of Canada, the United Kingdom accepts an offer of peace from the Union on the latter's terms.

The British frame the Confederacy for supposedly causing the Trent Affair and switches sides in the war. As a result, the Confederacy admits defeat in early 1863, which ends the conflict two years sooner. John Wilkes Booth is arrested and sentenced to death for trying to help Confederate snipers kill US President Abraham Lincoln and so Lincoln is never assassinated.

Most of the battles take place in Canada or in the oceans, like Hampton Roads. A cavalry battle near the end of the novel takes place on the outskirts of Harrisburg, Pennsylvania, presumably in Hummelstown and Hershey. The climactic battle takes place in Washington.
