= Red Inferno: 1945 =

2010 novel by Robert Conroy

- Author: Robert Conroy
- Cover artist: Christopher Sergio
- Language: English
- Genre: Alternate history
- Publisher: Ballantine Books
- Publication date: February 23, 2010
- Publication place: United States
- Media type: trade paperback
- Pages: 353
- ISBN: 978-0-345-50606-1
- Dewey Decimal: 813'.54--dc22
- LC Class: PS3553.O51986R43 2010

Red Inferno: 1945 is a 2010 novel written by Robert Conroy, the author of other alternate history novels.

== Plot ==
The novel introduces actual historical events that happened in our timeline and then tells of the point of divergence before its story begins.

In our timeline, the Allied forces in Europe, under the command of General Dwight Eisenhower, halted all further advance into Nazi Germany in April 1945 at the Elbe River while the Red Army battled the surviving German divisions on its way to Berlin.

However, in the alternative timeline, instead of halting the Allied advance into Germany, US President Harry S. Truman authorizes the US Army to continue across the Elbe and to head for Berlin to bring a quick end to the war to guarantee the West's share of the to-be-divided German capital with their forces in the city. However, Soviet Premier Joseph Stalin, despite the agreed terms of dividing Berlin and Germany with the Western Allies, wants to take Berlin for himself on the grounds that the Soviet Union deserves the most to conquer its archenemy's capital after the unparalleled brutality of the Eastern Front. He even goes as far as to order the Red Army to attack any US forces on sight if they ever get near Berlin to intimidate the West into leaving Berlin to the Soviets.

Word of the exchange between the American advance to Berlin and the Soviet forces reaches Moscow and Washington, DC. It was confirmed that the US had crossed the agreed occupation boundaries. Stalin believes that both he and the US had voided the Yalta Agreements and so now the United States and Soviet Union are de facto enemies. Combined with his paranoia that the West wants to take the Soviets' chance of revenge on Germany from him, he refuses to allow it. With the invalidated postwar divide already causing hostilities, he decides to conquer and occupy Germany and all of the rest of Europe while the Soviet Union still has the chance and so he starts another world war.

Eisenhower and the US Army get pushed back across the Elbe and lose thousands of troops. A whole US armored division, along with fleeing German civilians and prisoners-of-war, are cut off from the main force and holed up in Potsdam to which the Soviets lay siege throughout the whole war. Over the course of a few months from late April to August, the Red Army wages a war of attrition as its overwhelming numbers slowly force the Western Allies westward across Germany to the Weser. The Soviets also try to divide the Western Allies by spreading communist influence to the surrounding nations, and they hope to spark revolutions in the Allied to hinder US efforts to hold the Soviets east of the Rhine.

The plans to hinder the US war effort eventually backfire on the Soviets, as Switzerland and Finland cease their neutrality and allow Allied armies to cross their borders to the front lines, which ensures a continuous flow of troops and supplies to the Allied forces. The US Army Air Force also conducts long-range strategic bombing sorties into the Soviet Union, with the introduction of the B-29 Superfortress from the Pacific Theater, which is diverted from its initial targets at Hiroshima, Nagasaki and the Kure and Yokosuka naval districts, which has left them relatively intact. They target Soviet fuel and oil production and deprive the Red Army of any means to conduct further offenses. Things also take a drastic turn when the remaining Wehrmacht forces and the former government of Nazi Germany sign an armistice with the Western Allies and agree to fight with them against the Soviets.

The novel ends in the early winter of 1946, with communism collapsing and the other Soviet republics breaking away from the Soviet Union to form their own sovereign nations, similar to today's Commonwealth of Independent States. China suffers from a civil war, as a new communist government seizes power, and America becomes the world's sole nuclear superpower.

Following the conflict, demobilized troops, political leaders, prisoners of war, and displaced civilians returned to their home countries across Europe and Asia, where post-war reconstruction efforts began.
