= Ring of Fire II =

2008 anthology by Eric Flint

Ring of Fire
- First edition
- Author: Eric Flint
- Cover artist: Tom Kidd
- Language: English
- Series: 1632 series
- Genre: Alternate history, science fiction
- Publisher: Baen Books
- Publication date: January 2008
- Publication place: United States
- ISBN: 1-4165-7387-9 (2008 hardcover)
- OCLC: 82864474
- Dewey Decimal: 813.0876608
- Preceded by: 1634: The Bavarian Crisis
- Followed by: Grantville Gazette IV

Ring of Fire II is a 2008 anthology created by editor-author-historian Eric Flint. It is the second anthology in the 1632 series, after Ring of Fire (2004).

== Premise of the series ==
The initial Ring of Fire book was a notable departure in that it heralded a new era in writing series fiction by being set in an authors' milieu shared with other writers, but especially and uncharacteristically by doing so without the control of the milieu creator, its author. Flint, in explanation, has self-styled himself as something of a gambler; he demonstrated that by deliberately asking the other writers to share in creating the main threads and plot lines of the milieu so that this work and the large second full novel in the series, 1633, were written contemporaneously.

Flint is on record as saying that large portions of 1633 were adjusted drastically, even thrown out and rewritten as later submissions in the collected stories in Ring of Fire impacted the various and diverse story threads. For a fuller precis on this historic literary development, see Assiti Shards series.

== Stories in the anthology ==
=== "City of the Dead" ===
by Jay Robison

=== "Noelle Comes Home" ===
by Virginia DeMarce

Flint's e-book preface refers to this work as being a prequel to his own short novel (below), but the title does not agree with the credited work on 1632.org's timeframes spreadsheet.

=== "Horse Thieves" ===
by Karen Bergstralh

The story focuses on four former mercenaries who worked for Count Tilly before being exempted on good behavior and becoming horse traders in Grantville. While returning to Grantville following a horse trade in France, the traders encounter a foreign mercenary army contingent preparing to attack Grantville's allied city, Badenburg. They also observe that the mercenaries are equipped with American Civil War era equipment and doctrines that they had somehow acquired from modern history books. The traders - with help from the American militia - make several skirmishes against the army before finally eliminating them.

=== "Second Issue?" ===
by Eric Flint and Bradley H. Sinor

This is a story by Bradley H. Sinor about the birth of tabloid journalism in Grantville. The plot structure begins with a suggestion that it might be a tale of investigative journalism, but it ends with a humorous twist. There are tight connections between this story and "The Wallenstein Gambit"

=== "Diving Belle" ===
by Gunnar Dahlin and Dave Freer

This is a by Gunnar Dahlin and Dave Freer about an attempt to raise the Vasa from its resting place in Stockholm harbor. Or, is it an elaborate fraud?

=== "A Gift from the Duchess" ===
by Virginia DeMarce

=== "Lucky at Cards" ===
by Andrew Dennis

=== "A Trip to Amsterdam" ===
by Gorg Huff and Paula Goodlett

This vignette by Gorg Huff and Paula Goodlett returns to the story of the two groups maturing of tycoons known respectively as the Sewing Circle and the Barbie Consortium introduced initially in "The Sewing Circle", continued again in "Other People’s Money", and other seminal background tales.

=== "This'll Be the Day..." ===
by Walt Boyes

The story recounts the deeds of Father Friedrich Spee von Langenfeld on the day of his former death.

=== "Command Performance" ===
by David Carrico

This continuation of the "Franz and Marla" stories by David Carrico ties in with a brief mention of the story behind and within the concert as told here. The same tale, from a different prospective was used as background for the entrance of Admiral John Simpson and wife Mary as they come on stage during the end of the industrial disaster that begins the novel 1634: The Baltic War.

As a continuation of the Franz and Marla saga, the tale depicts Marla's debut in Magdeburg, while Franz begins playing music publicly again and gains self-confidence. Like the preceding Franz and Marla stories, it focuses on character development under life pressures.

=== "Ellis Island" ===
by Russ Rittgers

The story recounts the tribulations of a peasant family immigrating to Grantville.

=== "Malungu Seed" ===
by Jonathan Cresswell

The story focuses on an African Jesuit layman who has an urgent mission in Grantville and elsewhere.

=== "Trials" ===
by Jay Robison

The story focuses on the trials of Italian artist Artemisia Gentileschi and a Grantville housewife.

=== "The Chase" ===
by Iver Cooper

This story is a sequel to "Grand Tour," which appeared in Grantville Gazette X, in which historical figures Thomas Hobbes and a young William Cavendish (the Earl of Devonshire) have arrived in their destination in Grantville and befriending several of the young ladies of the "Barbie Consortium."

There is a scene set at a down-time tennis court, and it's worth noting that Iver also wrote an article on down-time tennis ("Tennis: The Game of Kings") which appeared in Grantville Gazette XV.

=== "Eddie and the King's Daughter" ===
by K.D. Wentworth

Set as a prequel to 1634: The Baltic War, the story focuses on Eddie Cantrell, who was captured by the Danish in the confused aftermath the Battle of Wismar depicted in 1633, became involved with the daughter of Christian IV of Denmark.

=== "Second Thoughts" ===
by Virginia DeMarce

The story discloses the events leading to marriage between the parents of Noelle Brigitte Murphy.

=== "The Austro-Hungarian Connection" ===
by Eric Flint

This short novel by Flint features a return to the enigmatic secret agent, Noelle Murphy, introduced in 1634: The Ram Rebellion who considered becoming a Catholic Nun (see "Enter the Ram").

== Literary significance and reception ==
A reviewer for SFRevu wrote that he liked the book because "the characters are allowed to be flawed. They often are given the chance for redemption, but don't always take it." Another reviewer wrote that "this anthology has a sort of crazy-quilt feel at times" since "the stories connect to one another and to the other anthologies and novels in various complex ways, reinforcing one another by casting light on aspects of characters and events that might otherwise be ignored." However, "the gems in this anthology outweigh the few weak ones" and "heartily recommend the purchase". The reviewer also recommends re-reading the other novels and anthologies of the series to "really appreciate all the interconnections between the various storylines".

Ring of Fire II was listed on the Locus Hardcovers Bestsellers List for a single month in 2008 at number 6.
