= World (disambiguation) =

The world is the totality of existing entities.

It is also common name for the whole of human civilization.

World, worlds or the world may also refer to:

== Astronomy ==
- Universe, all of space and time and their contents
- Planetary-mass object, size-based definition of celestial objects
  - Planet
  - Natural satellite
  - Dwarf planet
- Earth, the planet humans live on

== Businesses and companies ==
- World (blockchain), a cryptocurrency project formerly known as Worldcoin
- WWF New York, a defunct nightclub in New York City that later became known as The World

== Periodicals ==
- Tulsa World, a Tulsa, Oklahoma newspaper
- World (magazine), an evangelical news magazine
- The World, a 2004 proposed newspaper by Stephen Glover
- El Mundo (Spain), a Spanish newspaper
- Le Monde, a French newspaper
- Die Welt, a German newspaper
- National Geographic World, a former name of the magazine National Geographic Kids
- New York World, a former New York City newspaper (1860–1931)
- The Evening World, a former New York City newspaper (1887–1931)

== Gaming ==
- Level (video gaming)

== Literature ==
- Worlds (short story collection), a collection of science fiction and fantasy short stories by Eric Flint

== Media ==
=== Television channels ===
- BTV World, a defunct Bangladeshi television channel
- BBC World (later BBC World News), the former name of BBC News (international TV channel)
- Carlton World, a defunct British television channel
- CBC Newsworld, the former name of Canadian television news channel CBC News Network
  - CBC Newsworld International, a defunct television news channel
- CNBC World, an American television business news channel
- ERT World, the former name of Greek television channel ERT Cosmos
- PTV World, a Pakistani television news channel
- SVT World, a defunct Swedish television channel
- TRT World, a Turkish television news channel
- TVRI World, an Indonesian television channel
- World Channel, formerly PBS World, an American television channel

== Music ==
=== Albums ===
- World (album), by D:Ream, 1995
- Worlds (Joe Lovano album), 1989
- Worlds (Porter Robinson album), 2014

=== Songs ===
- "World" (Bee Gees song), 1967
- "World" (Five for Fighting song), 2006
- "World" (James Brown song), 1969
- "World" (Lindita song), 2017
- "World (The Price of Love)", by New Order, 1993
- "World", by Richie Sambora from Aftermath of the Lowdown, 2012
- "_World", by Seventeen from Sector 17, 2022

== Other ==
- World, a computer software suite developed by JD Edwards, a company now owned by Oracle Corporation
- MS The World, a cruise ship
- Miss World, a beauty contest
- Ontological world, by which human beings are able to make sense of things in general, see world disclosure
- World view, the framework of ideas and beliefs through which an individual interprets the world
- World B. Free (born Lloyd B. Free; 1953), American basketball player
- Jerry Rice, nicknamed "World" (born 1962), American football player

== See also ==
- Another World (disambiguation)
- New World (disambiguation)
- Old World (disambiguation)
- One World (disambiguation)
- Possible Worlds (disambiguation)
- This World (disambiguation)
- Worlds Away (disambiguation)
- Wrld (disambiguation)
- Wurld (disambiguation)
- The World (disambiguation)
