= Mannington, West Virginia =

City in West Virginia, US

- City
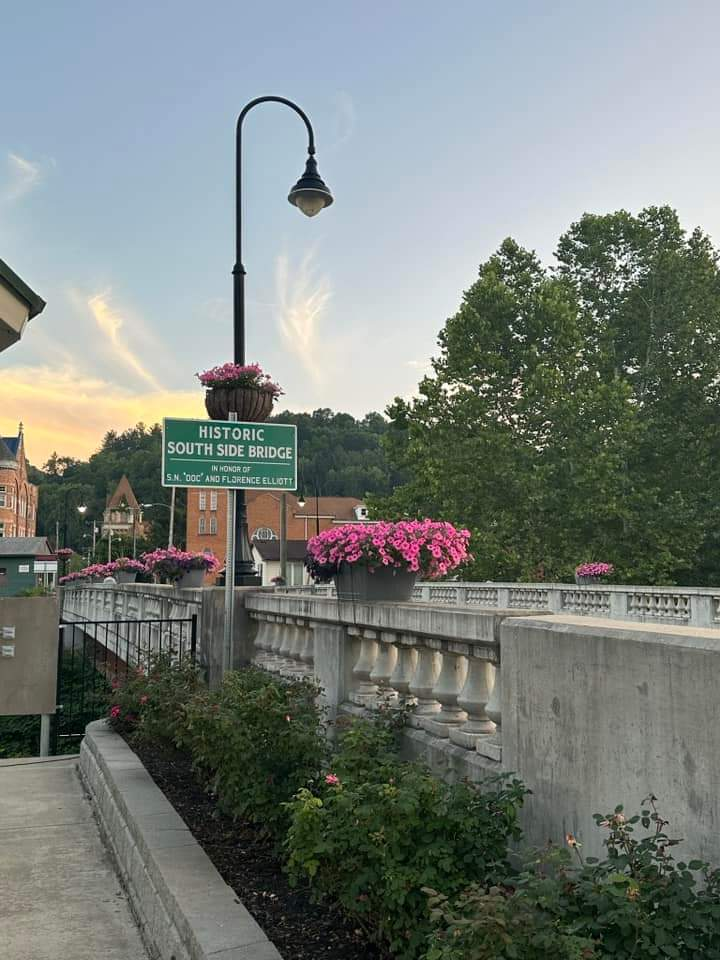
- Mannington Historic District, September 2023

- Location of Mannington in Marion County, West Virginia.
- Coordinates: 39°31′38″N 80°20′23″W
- Country: United States
- State: West Virginia
- County: Marion

Area
  - Total: 1.14 sq mi (2.95 km^{2})
  - Land: 1.09 sq mi (2.83 km^{2})
  - Water: 0.046 sq mi (0.12 km^{2})
- Elevation: 974 ft (297 m)

Population (2020)
  - Total: 1,952
  - Estimate (2021): 1,946
  - Density: 1,851.2/sq mi (714.74/km^{2})
- Time zone: UTC-5 (Eastern (EST))
  - Summer (DST): UTC-4 (EDT)
- ZIP code: 26582
- Area code: 304/681
- FIPS code: 54-51100
- GNIS feature ID: 1542721
- Website: www.cityofmannington.com

Mannington is a city in Marion County, West Virginia, United States, located in the hills of North Central West Virginia. The population was 1,961 at the 2020 census. In its earliest years it was called Forks of Buffalo or Koon Town, but has been called Mannington since 1856.

== History ==
=== Early history ===
At the time of the first settlement, the west fork of Buffalo Creek was known as Warrior's Fork, while the North Fork has historically borne the name of Pyle's Fork. One of the first settlers in the area was John Ice, who was born in the valley of the South Branch of the Potomac River in what was then Virginia. As a child, Ice and his father searched in vain for his mother, two sisters and brother who had been captured by Native Americans. The mother was never found, although the children ultimately were. Only John's brother, known from then on as "Indian Billy" returned to the family. The sisters chose to remain with their one time captors (Prichard 1983).

Native American activity was not uncommon in the area and many settlers and travelers met their fate at the hands of the Native Americans, including John Madison, the cousin of James Madison the future president, who was killed on a surveying trip in the area in 1783. Although not necessarily as a result of this, James Madison did procure, as an investment, some land on Brush Run and Pyles Fork just north of Forks of Buffalo.

The earliest population concentration did not occur in what is now Mannington, but rather approximately two miles west of Dent's Run. Most of the land now falling within the city limits, some 1,360 acres (5.5 km^{2}), was owned by Robert Rutherford, a Revolutionary War financier and an intimate friend of George Washington. In 1799, Rutherford sold his Forks of Buffalo holdings to James Brown of Berkeley County, Virginia, who, after experiencing financial setbacks, eventually sold the property at public sale in 1824 to a group of Baltimore, Maryland, investors which included William Baker. Baker apparently bought out his partners and, in turn, sold the parcel to James Hanway, a surveyor living in Monongalia County, who parceled the land and began selling it. This final transaction occurred in 1840 and it was then that the area now known as Mannington had its genesis.

After the parceling of the land around the Forks of Buffalo, interest in the area increased as did the population. A number of log houses began to be built, with the accompanying entrepreneurial activities that one might expect in an early settlement. By 1850 a tavern owned by George and Samuel Koon appeared in the heart of the burgeoning town. Not long after the tavern was opened, the Forks of Buffalo began to be known as Koon Town. While the local inhabitants may have used the newer name, the United States government failed to do so, in 1850 naming their first postal office in the community the Forks of Buffalo Post Office. It was not until 1856 that the village officially became known as Mannington, named after Charles Manning, a civil engineer with the Baltimore and Ohio (B&O) Railroad. Manning was well liked by the community and the inhabitants were eager to have a more "dignified" name for a growing town on the new railroad line.

The coming of the railroad heralded the introduction of heavier industry in the Mannington area. Logging and coal were two of the obvious industries which were developed along the railroad line, but there were a great many peripheral industries which appeared as well. Tree bark was used by the tanneries, which, in turn, produced a wide range of leather goods. New planing mills, sawmills, and woodworking plants were started, and the availability of transportation also witnessed an increase in cattle, sheep and crop production.

During the American Civil War, the B&O railroad, of vital interest to both of the conflicting sides, sustained more damage than Mannington proper did. While Confederate forces succeeded in burning several of the railroad bridges at the very beginning of the conflict, reinforcements from the Union insured the integrity of the Mannington section of the line for the remainder of the war.

=== Oil and gas boom ===
A new chapter in Mannington's history began in 1889 with the first oil drilling, following recommendations made by Dr. Israel C. White, a well-known geologist who later became West Virginia State Geologist. Although many felt that the area was unfavorable for oil reserves, White persisted and soon gained enough local support to drill. Following the first strike, late in 1889, real estate prices soared 100% in two days in a boom-town mentality. The Mannington field became one of the largest in the state, with the largest well producing about 1,600 barrels per day (250 m^{3}/d).

Dr. White also pushed for natural gas exploration. It was this venture, more successful than any before or since, that was most responsible for Mannington's growth. The population increased from approximately 700 people in the late 19th century to over 4,000 by 1917. By 1900, Mannington was a thriving town, complete with its own trolley system, electricity, theaters, schools, fire department, telephones and other amenities. The Mannington School Building, constructed in 1902–1903, was the pride of both the town and the state. In 1923, Albert Heck began the formation of the first community radio cable system from Mannington to its outlying areas.

=== Boom to bust ===
The 1929 stock market crash and the Depression severely affected Mannington's economy. The trolley ceased operation in 1933, factory workers left as demand for products decreased, and the town's population began to decline.

== Geography ==
Mannington is located along Buffalo Creek.

According to the United States Census Bureau, the city has a total area of 1.15 square miles (2.98 km^{2}), of which 1.10 square miles (2.85 km^{2}) is land and 0.05 square miles (0.13 km^{2}) is water.

=== Climate ===
The climate in this area is characterized by relatively high temperatures and evenly distributed precipitation throughout the year. According to the Köppen Climate Classification system, Mannington has a Humid subtropical climate, abbreviated "Cfa" on climate maps.

Climate data for Mannington, West Virginia (1991–2020 normals, extremes 1980–present)
Month	Jan	Feb	Mar	Apr	May	Jun	Jul	Aug	Sep	Oct	Nov	Dec	Year
Record high °F (°C)	75 (24)	80 (27)	88 (31)	93 (34)	94 (34)	97 (36)	103 (39)	100 (38)	98 (37)	93 (34)	82 (28)	75 (24)	103 (39)
Mean daily maximum °F (°C)	38.3 (3.5)	42.1 (5.6)	52.4 (11.3)	65.7 (18.7)	74.1 (23.4)	80.9 (27.2)	84.1 (28.9)	83.1 (28.4)	77.1 (25.1)	65.7 (18.7)	52.8 (11.6)	42.5 (5.8)	63.2 (17.3)
Daily mean °F (°C)	28.5 (−1.9)	31.2 (−0.4)	39.7 (4.3)	51.0 (10.6)	60.4 (15.8)	68.1 (20.1)	72.1 (22.3)	70.7 (21.5)	63.8 (17.7)	52.2 (11.2)	41.1 (5.1)	33.2 (0.7)	51.0 (10.6)
Mean daily minimum °F (°C)	18.7 (−7.4)	20.3 (−6.5)	27.1 (−2.7)	36.2 (2.3)	46.7 (8.2)	53.3 (11.8)	60.0 (15.6)	58.3 (14.6)	50.5 (10.3)	38.7 (3.7)	29.4 (−1.4)	23.9 (−4.5)	38.8 (3.8)
Record low °F (°C)	−34 (−37)	−21 (−29)	−13 (−25)	12 (−11)	25 (−4)	25 (−4)	32 (0)	34 (1)	22 (−6)	14 (−10)	4 (−16)	−24 (−31)	−34 (−37)
Average precipitation inches (mm)	4.41 (112)	3.99 (101)	4.36 (111)	4.32 (110)	4.92 (125)	4.44 (113)	5.64 (143)	4.10 (104)	4.17 (106)	3.37 (86)	3.57 (91)	4.15 (105)	51.44 (1,307)
Average precipitation days (≥ 0.01 in)	18.2	15.9	14.1	15.4	15.1	13.1	12.6	10.9	10.5	10.7	12.7	16.7	165.9
Source: NOAA

== Demographics ==
Historical population
Census	Pop.	Note	%±
1860	241		—
1870	411		70.5%
1890	908		—
1900	1,681		85.1%
1910	2,672		59.0%
1920	3,673		37.5%
1930	3,261		−11.2%
1940	3,145		−3.6%
1950	3,241		3.1%
1960	2,996		−7.6%
1970	2,747		−8.3%
1980	3,036		10.5%
1990	2,184		−28.1%
2000	2,124		−2.7%
2010	2,063		−2.9%
2020	1,952		−5.4%
2021 (est.)	1,946		−0.3%
U.S. Decennial Census

=== 2020 census ===
As of the 2020 census, Mannington had a population of 1,952. The median age was 43.4 years. 21.1% of residents were under the age of 18 and 20.6% of residents were 65 years of age or older. For every 100 females there were 95.2 males, and for every 100 females age 18 and over there were 92.1 males age 18 and over.

0.0% of residents lived in urban areas, while 100.0% lived in rural areas.

There were 796 households in Mannington, of which 28.6% had children under the age of 18 living in them. Of all households, 43.6% were married-couple households, 18.1% were households with a male householder and no spouse or partner present, and 28.9% were households with a female householder and no spouse or partner present. About 28.3% of all households were made up of individuals and 12.4% had someone living alone who was 65 years of age or older.

There were 914 housing units, of which 12.9% were vacant. The homeowner vacancy rate was 2.8% and the rental vacancy rate was 8.2%.

Racial composition as of the 2020 census
Race	Number	Percent
White	1,837	94.1%
Black or African American	7	0.4%
American Indian and Alaska Native	8	0.4%
Asian	4	0.2%
Native Hawaiian and Other Pacific Islander	0	0.0%
Some other race	5	0.3%
Two or more races	91	4.7%
Hispanic or Latino (of any race)	41	2.1%

=== 2010 census ===
As of the census of 2010, there were 2,063 people, 842 households, and 578 families living in the city. The population density was 1,875.5 inhabitants per square mile (724.1/km^{2}). There were 964 housing units at an average density of 876.4 units per square mile (338.4 units/km^{2}). The racial makeup of the city was 98.8% White, 0.2% African American, 0.2% Native American, 0.3% Asian, and 0.4% from two or more races. Hispanic or Latino of any race were 0.9% of the population.

There were 842 households, of which 31.8% had children under the age of 18 living with them, 49.5% were married couples living together, 13.3% had a female householder with no husband present, 5.8% had a male householder with no wife present, and 31.4% were non-families. 27.0% of all households were made up of individuals, and 13% had someone living alone who was 65 years of age or older. The average household size was 2.45 and the average family size was 2.95.

The median age in the city was 41.8 years. 23.5% of residents were under the age of 18; 6.8% were between the ages of 18 and 24; 24.6% were from 25 to 44; 27.5% were from 45 to 64; and 17.5% were 65 years of age or older. The gender makeup of the city was 47.8% male and 52.2% female.

=== 2000 census ===
As of the census of 2000, there were 2,124 people, 884 households, and 625 families living in the city. The population density was 1,823.8 people per square mile (704.2 people/km^{2}). There were 990 housing units at an average density of 850.1 units per square mile (328.2 units/km^{2}). The racial makeup of the city was 83.9% White,2.54% African American, 0.42% Native American, 0.19% Asian, and 0.71% from two or more races. Hispanics or Latinos of any race were 0.33% of the population.

There were 884 households, out of which 28.3% had children under the age of 18 living with them, 52.7% were married couples living together, 14.4% had a female householder with no husband present, and 29.2% were non-families. 26.4% of all households were made up of individuals, and 17.4% had someone living alone who was 65 years of age or older. The average household size was 2.40 and the average family size was 2.88.

The age distribution was 23.0% under the age of 18, 7.8% from 18 to 24, 25.3% from 25 to 44, 24.7% from 45 to 64, and 19.2% who were 65 years of age or older. The median age was 40 years. For every 100 females, there were 85.2 males. For every 100 females age 18 and over, there were 82.9 males.

The median income for a household in the city was $26,806, and the median income for a family was $31,852. Males had a median income of $25,078 versus $19,464 for females. The per capita income for the city was $13,036. About 12.7% of families and 18.3% of the population were below the poverty line, including 37.1% of those under age 18 and 9.8% of those age 65 or over.

== Infrastructure ==
=== Roads ===
- U.S. Route 250 - main road through town

== Popular culture ==
- Scenes in the film Gaslit By My Husband: The Morgan Metzer Story were filmed in Mannington.
- Scenes in the film The Bad Guardian were filmed in Mannington.
- Mannington is the model for the fictional town of Grantville in Eric Flint's best selling 1632 series of alternate history novels: 1632, 1633, Ring of Fire, The Grantville Gazette, and other book-length and shorter works. The 1632 series has evolved into a large-scale experiment in collaborative fiction and has attracted considerable interest from other best selling writers, including David Weber and Mercedes Lackey. The premise of the series is that, in about April 2000, irresponsible aliens (accidentally) exchanged a sphere with a radius of about three miles (4.8 km) centered on Grantville with an equally sized chunk of Thuringia from 1631, plunging the town into the midst of the Thirty Years' War.

== See also ==
- List of cities in West Virginia
- Farmington Mine Disaster (sometimes referred to as the Mannington Mine Disaster), 20 November 1968, 4 men survived, 78 died.
- Fairmont Marion County Transit Authority
