= Worlds =

Worlds may refer to:

- Worlds, the plural of world
- Worlds (short story collection), a 2009 collection of science fiction and fantasy short stories by Eric Flint
- Worlds (novel), a 1981 novel by Joe Haldeman
- Worlds (Joe Lovano album), 1989
- Worlds (Porter Robinson album), 2014
- Worlds, abbreviated name for a world championship event

== See also ==
- World (disambiguation)
