= Timeline of Radio Televisyen Malaysia =

From founding in 1946

This is a timeline of the history of Radio Televisyen Malaysia (RTM), listing notable milestones for RTM.

== 1940s and 1950s ==

- 1946
  - 1 April – Radio Malaya was established at Caldecott Hill in Singapore. The first branch station of Radio Malaya was opened in Penang and followed by the opening of its second station in Malacca on the same day.
- 1950
  - Radio Malaya began temporary operations in Jalan Young (now Jalan Cenderasari).
- 1954
  - 7 June – Radio Sarawak was launched.
- 1955
  - 9 November – Radio Sabah was launched.
- 1957
  - 31 August – Radio Malaya was split into three separate stations: the original studio in Singapore and a new studio in Kuala Lumpur, Malaya.
- 1959
  - RTM's English, Chinese and Tamil language radio service became known as the Blue, Green and Red Networks.
  - 1 January – Radio Malaya moved to Kuala Lumpur and began operations at the 5th to 6th floor of the Federal House.

== 1960s ==
Televisyen Malaysia logo, used from 1963 until 1969.

- 1961
  - 1 April – Orkes Radio Malaya was launched.
- 1963
  - 15 February – Voice of Malaysia (VoM) was launched with three languages in the beginning: English, Mandarin and Indonesian.
  - 16 September – Radio Malaya was renamed as Radio Malaysia. On the same day, Radio Sabah, Radio Sarawak and Radio Singapura became part of the Radio Malaysia network as state stations for Sabah, Sarawak and Singapore listeners respectively. Orkes Radio Malaya renamed as Orkes Radio Malaysia.
  - 16 November – RTM local station in Kelantan was established.
  - 28 December – Televisyen Malaysia was launched and began operations.
  - 30 December – The first television news on Televisyen Malaysia began broadcast.
- 1968
  - 10 February – RTM local station in Johor was established and began operations.
  - 17 February – Angkasapuri was officially opened by the first Prime Minister, Tunku Abdul Rahman and began operations after two years of construction.
- 1969
  - 6 October – Angkasapuri began its first broadcast.
  - 11 October – Radio Malaysia and Televisyen Malaysia merged to become Radio Televisyen Malaysia. Dol Ramli become its first Director-General. On the same day, Orkes Radio Malaysia changed its name to Orkestra RTM.
  - 6 November – Wisma Televisyen was launched.
  - 17 November – Rangkaian Kedua was launched and began operations. On the same day, RTM became part of the Ministry of Information.

== 1970s ==
RTM's first logo, used from 1969 until 1978.

- 1971
  - 1 January – Radio Malaysia rebranded as Rangkaian Nasional and became the first radio stations to be operated for 24 hours a day, seven days a week.
  - 16 August – Rangkaian Pertama expand its broadcast in Kuala Terengganu, Terengganu.
  - 30 December – Rangkaian Ketiga was launched.
- 1972
  - January – Radio Malaysia went off the air for a few days following the recent Kuala Lumpur floods.
  - 1 January – Thai-languaged version of Voice of Malaysia was launched.
  - March – Drama Minggu Ini (This Week's Drama), a weekly local 30-minute drama anthology, began premiered as a monthly local hour-long dramas.
  - 9 May – Wisma Radio was launched.
  - 19 June – TV Pendidikan began broadcasting on TV1.
  - 1 November – Arabic-languaged version of Voice of Malaysia was launched.
- 1973
  - 22 October – Tagalog-languaged version of Voice of Malaysia was launched.
  - 5 November – Radio Tiga Ibukota was launched.
- 1975
  - March – RTM acquire Rangkaian Ketiga from the Government of Sabah.
  - 20 June – FM Stereo was launched and went on air, with a frequency focused on the Klang Valley area.
  - 30 August – The first TV1 broadcasts began in Sabah and Sarawak.
- 1978
  - 28 December – TV1 began broadcasting in colour.
- 1979
  - 7 May – TV2 began broadcasting in colour.

== 1980s ==
RTM's second logo, used from 1978 until 1987.

- 1980
  - May – Voice of Malaysia expand its reach to Indochina countries, Japan and Europe.
  - 31 August – RTM began colour broadcasting in East Malaysia.
- 1982
  - January – Berita RTM's Malay language newscast had its main edition moved to 9pm on weekdays.
  - June – RTM began allowing private companies to sponsor feature films screenings.
  - 18 October – A new format of television news broadcasting was introduced.
- 1983
  - 31 August – TV2 began broadcasting in Sabah and Sarawak.
- 1984
  - 1 January – First broadcast of Selamat Pagi Malaysia, a morning breakfast talk show.
  - February – TV1 and TV2 began to air a digital time display which appear at the bottom-left of the screen.
  - November – RTM began reorganisation on its news division.
- 1985
  - January – Drama Swasta was introduced and began airing, which aimed to revive the then-ailing local film industry.
  - December – Rangkaian Ketiga ceased operations following the expansion of RTM2 in Sabah and Sarawak.
- 1987
  - June – RTM's Voice of Malaysia shortwave broadcasts were upgraded.
  - 14 June – RTM reduced the broadcasting hours of its television channels and removed the midnight movie slot.
  - 29 June – RTM's news programming was reformatted with a new look for its newscasts and the debut of national and international news bulletins. Berita Wilayah, a new regional newscast with updates from RTM's regional studios everyday of the week, was introduced and began airing.
  - 27 December – RTM launched a new logo and a new corporate slogan, Teman Setia Anda.
- 1988
  - 1 February – TV2's English, Mandarin and Tamil news broadcasts were extended from 20 minutes to 25 minutes long.
  - 17 December – The earth-satellite complex in Angkasapuri was opened, costing RM 3 million, marking RTM's entry into "direct satellite broadcasting".
- 1989
  - 1 January – Rangkaian Nasional rebranded as Radio 1.

== 1990s ==
RTM's third logo, used from 1987 until 2004.

- 1990
  - First broadcast of Forum Perdana Ehwal Islam, an Islamic talk show.
  - January – Radio 4, 5 and 6 increased its broadcasting from 10 hours to 18 hours a day.
  - January – RTM worked on an agreement to supply news footage to CNN and One World Channel, which was later finalised.
  - January — RTM's television channels were being seen through the Palapa satellite, reaching viewers in ASEAN countries, Papua New Guinea and Australia.
  - February — RTM1 and RTM2 rebranded as TV1 and TV2.
  - April – RTM and TV3 began collaborations for the Mandarin news broadcasting, but did not impose any payments for the service.
  - 16 August – RTM local stations in Selangor and Negeri Sembilan was established and began operations.
- 1991
  - 1 June – RTM local station in Perlis was established and began operations.
  - September – The Subscription News Service (SNS) was introduced to provide information and entertainment news.
  - 29 December – A mobile radio station was launched as part of the expansion of Radio 3's broadcast.
- 1992
  - December – RTM's five radio stations began broadcasting on FM as an effort to refrain Malaysians living in border areas from listening to radio broadcasts from neighbouring countries.
- 1993
  - February – Prime time slots on TV1 and TV2 were extended to 11:30 pm in stages instead of 7 pm to 10 pm.
  - April – RTM began restructuring and reorganizing program schedule for its television and radio stations gradually.
- 1994
  - 1 March – TV1 began daytime broadcasting. TV Pendidikan shifted to TV2.
  - March – Memandu Bersama Petronas began airing on four of RTM's radio stations in collaboration with Petronas.
  - May – RTM discontinued the BBC World Service Television following a dispute with the BBC.
  - August – Radio 2 began 24-hour broadcasting.
- 1995
  - November – RTM introduced sign language in its television news broadcasts.
  - 27 December – RTMNet website was launched and becoming the first broadcaster in Asia to broadcast over the internet with six national radio stations streaming over the service.
- 1996
  - 1 April – RTM celebrates its 50th anniversary as a Government-owned broadcasting corporation. TV1 began 24 hour broadcast for the first time while TV2 began 18 hour broadcast.
  - August – RTM began transmitting from the Kuala Lumpur Tower.
  - 25 October – RTM became the first broadcaster in Asia to stream the Budget on the internet, partnering with local computer company MCSB Systems.
- 1997
  - August – RTM began broadcasting of Suara Islam radio to Malaysian listeners, with content available in Malay, English and Arabic.
- 1998
  - 11 March – Radio Irama Melayu Asli (RiMA) began broadcasting.
  - May – Crime prevention slogans began broadcast on TV1 and TV2 in partnership with the Malaysia Crime Prevention Foundation (MCPF).
- 1999
  - June – RTM expand the running time for its primetime news broadcast from half an hour to 45 minutes.
  - 30 December – TV Pendidikan ceased broadcasting on TV2, marking the end of 27-year of its run in RTM. It was later shifted to Astro.

== 2000s ==
RTM's fourth logo, used from 2004 until 2021.

- 2000
  - January – TV2 began daytime broadcasting.
  - October – A memorandum of understanding (MoU) between RTM and Fuji Television for the TV programs and news exchanges was signed.
- 2001
  - April – Restructuring of scheduling time for TV1 and TV2.
- 2002
  - 7 January – First broadcast of Panorama, a magazine documentary.
- 2003
  - 1 January – TV1 and TV2 underwent programme rescheduling.
- 2004
  - First broadcast of Simfoni Alam and Agrotek.
  - June – Reorganisation of RTM broadcast operations.
  - August – RTM launches new corporate identity.
- 2005
  - 1 April – Rebranding of all RTM's radio stations.
- 2006
  - 1 April – RTM celebrates its 60th anniversary and began non-stop broadcasting for 60 hours and airs programs in selected locations on its radio and TV networks. TV1 and TV2 rebranded for the second time as RTM1 and RTM2.
  - 3 April – TV2 began 24-hour broadcasting.
  - 12 August – Klasik Nasional was created from the merger of Klasik FM and Nasional FM.
  - September – Implementation of trial period of digital broadcasting, which lasted for six months.
- 2008
  - August – RTM and TVRI partnered to merge their respective news bulletins known as Warta Serumpun.
  - December – Establishment of the RTM Disaster Unit.
- 2009
  - First broadcast of Salam Baitullah.
  - 1 January – RTM1 and RTM2 reverted back to its original channel names respectively with the introduction of new logo and slogan. RTM branch station in Keningau, Sabah was launched and began operations.
  - March – Muzik Aktif began broadcasting.
  - 1 May – Arab, Burmese and Thai language services of Voice of Malaysia ceased broadcasting.

== 2010s ==
- 2011
  - 10 April – Muzik Aktif rebranded as TVi, shifting its format from music-oriented to East Malaysian culture.
  - 12 April – The sixth RTM station in Sarawak was opened in Bintulu.
  - 31 August – Voice of Malaysia was dissolved.
- 2012
  - 4 January – Klasik Nasional was demerged, with Klasik FM and Nasional FM returns as a separate radio stations.
  - 18 April – RTM Mobile was launched.
  - 21 August – TV1 began 24-hour broadcasting.
- 2013
  - RTM Mobile rebranded as RTM MyKlik.
  - 19 April – Portal 1News was launched.
  - 1 July – RTM Parlimen was launched.
  - 28 December – RTM celebrates 50th anniversary of Malaysian television.
- 2016
  - 1 April – RTM celebrates its 70th anniversary.
- 2017
  - 1 April – TVi rebranded as TV5, but only lasted for a week before being rebranded as TVi again
  - 9 April – First broadcast of Tumit Tinggi, a magazine program focusing on womanhood.
- 2018
  - 21 March – TVi rebranded as TV Okey.
- 2019
  - 1 April – Conty News was launched. TV1 and TV2 started their respective HDTV broadcasting.

== 2020s ==
RTM's fifth and current logo, used since 2021.

- 2020
  - 6 April – TV Pendidikan returned to RTM after 21 years and debuted on TV Okey.
  - 25 June – Berita RTM was launched.
- 2021
  - 1 January – RTM MyKlik rebranded as RTMKlik.
  - 1 March - TV6 was launched and began broadcasting
  - 1 April – RTM celebrates its 75th anniversary and unveils its new corporate logo. Sukan RTM was launched and began broadcasting.
- 2022
  - 30 April – Tagalog language service of Voice of Malaysia ceased broadcasting.
- 2023
  - Implementation of the 2021–2025 Strategic Plan and the 2021–2023 Transformation Plan which involving four pillars.
  - November – An MoU between RTM and Prasar Bharati was signed and was approved by the Indian cabinet.
  - 28 December – RTM celebrates 60th anniversary of Malaysian television.
- 2024
  - 6 January – 34 Je - Kita Suka began live broadcast for the first time on Nasional FM.
  - 25 May – RTM partnered with Astro to initiate Malaysia4Palestine, dedicated to highlighting the humanitarian crisis in Palestine in the wake of the ongoing Gaza war.
- 2025
  - February – Galaksi 34, RTM's new audio platform, was launched, utilising the Metaverse technology.
- 2026
  - 20 February – Suhaimi Sulaiman resigned as the Director-General of Broadcasting.
  - 23 February – Ashwad Ismail appointed as the new Director-General of Broadcasting.
  - 1 April – RTM celebrates its 80th anniversary.
  - May – RTM (and Unifi TV) secured rights as the official broadcaster of the 2026 World Cup.
  - 1 July - TV6 officially end its broadcasts

== See also ==
- Radio Televisyen Malaysia
- Radio Televisyen Malaysia controversies
