= Worlds (short story collection) =

Book by Eric Flint

- cover of the first edition
- Author: Eric Flint
- Cover artist: Tom Kidd
- Language: English
- Genre: Science fiction, fantasy
- Publisher: Baen Books
- Publication date: February 1, 2009
- Publication place: United States
- Media type: Print (hardcover)
- Pages: 559 pp
- ISBN: 978-1-4165-9142-9

Worlds is a collection of science fiction and fantasy short stories by Eric Flint. It was first published in hardcover and ebook format by Baen Books on February 1, 2009; a paperback edition was issued by the same publisher in October 2011.

The collection consists of ten short works of fiction, together with a preface, introductory notes introducing the individual stories and a bibliography of the author's works.

== Contents ==
- "Preface"

The Belisarius series

- "Author's Note"
- "Islands" (from The Warmasters, May 2002)

The 1632 series

- "Author's Note"
- "The Wallenstein Gambit" (from Ring of Fire, January 2004)

The Anne Jefferson stories

- "Portraits" (from The Grantville Gazette, Oct. 2003)
- "Steps in the Dance" (from Grantville Gazette II, March 2006)
- "Postage Due" (from Grantville Gazette III, January 2007)

The Honor Harrington series

- "Author's Note"
- "From the Highlands" (from Changer of Worlds, March 2001)

The Joe's World series

- "Author's Note"
- "Entropy, and the Strangler" (from L. Ron Hubbard Presents Writers of the Future, Volume IX, October 1993)
- "The Realm of Words" (from Jim Baen's Universe, June 2007)

The Rats, Bats & Vats series

- "Author's Note"
- "Genie Out of the Bottle" (with Dave Freer) (from Cosmic Tales II: Adventures in Far Futures, February 2005)

The Ranks of Bronze series

- "Author's Note"
- "Carthago Delenda Est" (from Foreign Legions, June 2001)
- "Appendix: Eric Flint Bibliography"
