= Wurld =

Wurld may refer to:

- Wurld Media, American company 1999-2008
- Wurld (musician) (born 1987), Nigerian musician

== See also ==
- World (disambiguation)
