= One World =

One World may refer to:

== Books and literature ==
- One World (Willkie book), a 1943 book by Wendell Willkie
- One World: A Global Anthology of Short Stories a 2009 book edited by Chris Brazier
- One World: The Ethics of Globalisation, a 2002 book by Peter Singer
- One World, an imprint of Penguin Random House

== Music ==
- One World Project, a supergroup formed to record a song for the 2004 Asian tsunami relief effort

=== Albums ===
- One World (The Feelers album) or the title song, 2006
- One World (John Denver album) or the title song, 1986
- One World (John Martyn album) or the title song, 1977
- One World (Rare Earth album), 1971
- One World (Redbone album) or the title song, 2005; re-released as Peace Pipe, 2009
- One World (Uniting Nations album), 2005
- The Cheetah Girls: One World (soundtrack), by the Cheetah Girls, or the title song, 2008
- One World, by Billy Ocean, 2020
- One World, John Tesh, 1999

=== Songs ===
- "One World", by Anthrax from Among the Living, 1987
- "One World", by Celtic Woman from Celtic Woman, 2005
- "One World", by Coldplay from Moon Music, 2024
- "One World", by Dire Straits from Brothers in Arms, 1985
- "One World", by Nik Kershaw from The Works, 1989
- "One World", by RedOne, 2018
- "One World", by TobyMac from Portable Sounds, 2007
- "One World (Not Three)", by the Police from Ghost in the Machine, 1981

== Television and film ==
- One World: Together at Home, a concert broadcast in support of the World Health Organization during the 2019–20 coronavirus pandemic
- One World Film Festival, an annual human rights' documentary film festival in Prague
- The Cheetah Girls: One World, a 2008 American television film
- Survivor: One World, the 24th season of the American version of Survivor
- One World, a 1998–2001 American television series
- One World Channel, a defunct television channel

== Organizations ==
- Oneworld, an airline alliance
- One World Action, a London-based charity
- One World Cafe, a cafe and community kitchen in Salt Lake City, Utah, U.S.
- One World Media, a British trust for promoting relations between developed and developing countries through the media
- One World Trust, a UK education and research trust

== See also ==
- Oneworld (disambiguation)
- Our World (disambiguation)
