= Grantville Gazette III =

2004 anthology of fan fiction stories

- Grantville Gazette III hardcover and paperback release book covers showing character Anne Jefferson posing for four Dutch and Spanish Master Artists amidst the "Siege of Amsterdam".
- Author: Eric Flint, et al.
- Cover artist: Tom Kidd
- Language: English
- Series: 1632 Series; Also known as the Ring of Fire Series
- Genre: Science fiction, Alternate History
- Publisher: Baen Books
- Publication date: eb: October, 2004 hc: January, 2007 pb: June 2008
- Publication place: United States
- Media type: E-book & Hardback & Paperback
- Pages: hardcover: 320 pages paperback: 464 pages
- ISBN: 978-1-4165-0941-7
- Preceded by: in the anthologies sub-series: Grantville Gazette II in publication order: 1635: The Cannon Law
- Followed by: in the anthologies sub-series: Grantville Gazette IV in printed publication order: 1634: The Baltic War

The Grantville Gazette III is the third collaborative and the fourth anthology in the 1632 series edited by the series creator, Eric Flint. It was published as an e-book by Baen Books in October 2004. It was released as a hardcover in January 2007, and trade paperback in June 2008 with both editions containing Flint's story "Postage Due".

== Book cover notes ==
=== E-book cover art ===
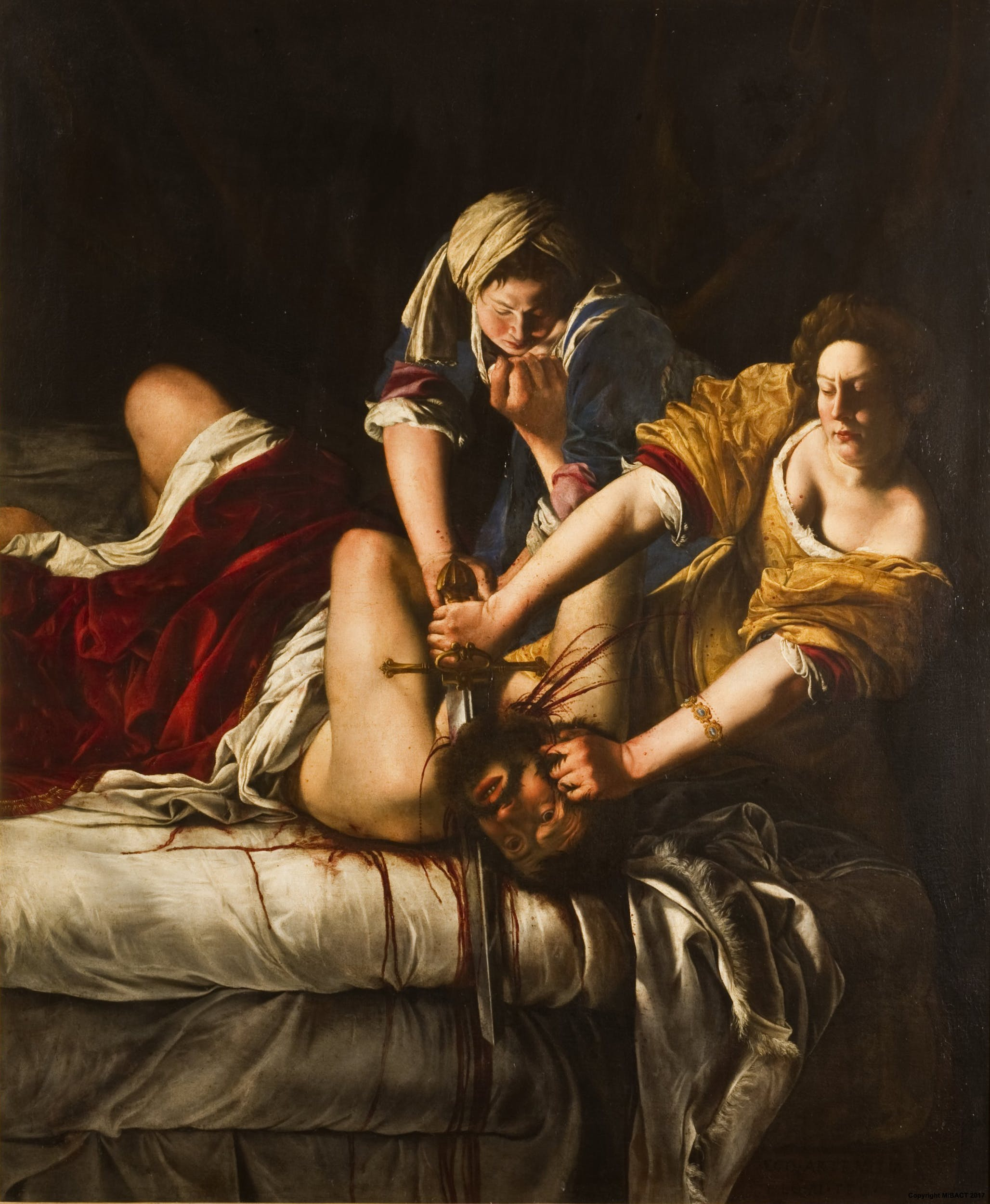
Baen e-book cover art Judith Beheading Holofernes by Artemisia Gentileschi, (1612-21), Oil on canvas

The illustration on the e-book cover is Judith Slaying Holofernes (Naples Version) by Artemisia Gentileschi (1593–1653), painted circa 1612–1613. Gentileschi was the most prominent female artist of the period, and is referred to in the novel 1634: The Galileo Affair, and appears earlier in the overall series timeline when she sends her daughter to Grantville in "Breaking News" in the anthology Grantville Gazette V. The Biblical episode involving Judith and her maidservant killing the Assyrian tyrant Holofernes was an immensely popular theme for painters and sculptors of the Renaissance and the early modern era.

== Story Synopses ==
=== "Postage Due" ===
by Eric Flint

This story might well be considered a continuing serial by Eric Flint, as it follows the trend set from the outset in Grantville Gazette I's "Portraits" wherein Anne Jefferson is cast as the common model for five seventeenth century master painters as Stearns hatches a plan to count another subtle-coup under the radar screen of the down-timer political opponents with their willing co-operation. As with his release of directions via Jefferson on how to make an antibiotic (See "Portraits" and culmination of the plot in 1634: The Baltic War), the politicians opposing the republic of the United States of Europe and democracy of the State of Thuringia-Franconia have no concept of the attack unleashed via the popular psyche.

In this the third installment of the Nurse's Amsterdam tale, Jefferson sits for Peter Paul Rubens a second time—during or shortly after a Stearns visit to the "siege of Amsterdam"—but also as part of the Stearns scheme at the same time, for "the unknown" young master painter-to-be Rembrandt and the resident Dutch portrait masters, the brothers Frans and Dirck Hals. Meanwhile, Special Forces Captain Harry Lefferts appears in a scene suggesting skulduggery and underhanded dealings with a specific reference to Frans Hals need for money and a Frenchman willing to outbid others in the Netherlands.

The story ends with Cardinal Richelieu selecting a painter and planning to join the parade of states in the new service, despite the nominal hostilities, which makes the postal service a typical Stearnsian stroke at the underpinnings of the old Europe, with untold and unexpected consequences for the down-time leaders adopting the new concept.

=== "Pastor Kastenmayer's Revenge" ===
by Virginia DeMarce

The story follows a good Lutheran pastor who escapes from a small village leading women and children whilst most of the villages men and boys perish fighting a delaying action against Count Tilly's rampaging mercenaries. In Grantville, his oldest daughter gets swept off her feet by a handsome up-timer and marries a few days later without permission.

With the help of a formidable widow, the pastor plots a fitting revenge and founds a fifth-column that seeks to not only trap eligible bachelors into marriage to his flock's dowerless eligible daughters, but to convert the American scoundrels into becoming stalwart Lutherans. He carefully targets young American men known to be "heretics" or lapsed in their own religions, and indirectly the scheme has the effect of rehabilitating some of the more under-achieving and undereducated American hillbillies into more solid citizens who can support a Lutheran family. The tale is loosely modeled on the Seven Daughters for Seven Sons, at least in numbers, and every couple has their story that spans the time line from 1631 to early 1635. It serves as an exposition of likely culture clash scenario's as the up-timers' social system comes up against a stubborn adherent of the religiously centered thought modes prevalent in the transitional period between middle-ages social modes and the social revolution inherent in modern thought embodied in Grantville's natives.

=== "The Sound of Music" ===
by David Carrico

"The Sound of Music" by David Carrico begins a set of stand-alone sequential stories (known as the "Franz and Marla stories" that may be considered as a serial) continued as "Heavy Metal Music" or alternatively, "Revolution in Three Flats" in the anthology Grantville Gazette IV. These stories feature a down and out down-timer musician, Franz Scylwester, a maestro violinist whose left hand had been deliberately mutilated by a rival, leading to the loss of his position with the orchestra of the Archbishopric of Mainz. The crippled former maestro violinist Franz Scylwester ekes out an existence writing correspondence letters for the illiterate and gradually wends his way across western Germany to Grantville. Here he is exposed to modern Rock and Roll (which appalls him), but also to modern musical knowledge from "Master Herr Professor Wendell" (the high school music teacher), where he learns about the breadth and depth of modern musical instruments and the systematized musical theory available from these strange people from the future.

Scylwester is befriended by a sympathetic female singer, Marla Linder, and the two are featured in a succession of stories (next beginning with "Heavy Metal Music" in the anthology Grantville Gazette IV), in effect serializing stories told from Scylwester's viewpoint, and uses the likable and sympathetic character to explore interactions between 1630s musical world and the intriguing blended American-German ("Ami-Deutsch".) culture coming into existence in central Europe. In this tale, the musician is writing a lengthy letter encouraging and entreating various colleagues from the Mainz music establishment to make haste to Grantville and its marvels.

=== "Other People's Money" ===
by Gorg Huff

Other People's Money continues the adventures of the teenage entrepreneurs and their families started in "The Sewing Circle" in Grantville Gazette I. Centered more on David and Sarah (who sneak in a 'creative date') early in the story, like the sewing circle, the story is based upon and builds deeper background for the burgeoning economy that is growing up in around Grantville because of the town residents' knowledge of industrial processes and advances in science and engineering. It seems everyone downtime wants a piece of an American enterprise, and knowing and being able to demonstrate a connection with an up-timer can be worth quite a lot. In this tale, a cautionary morality tale is included as sub-plot telling of injudicious greed, fast talking and overconfidence rear their head and introduce Carl Junkers who plays a reluctant role (out of necessity, as set up in this story and shortly afterward in the new timeline) in showing a way to merge German down-timer property law and practices with up-timer expectations of different kind of more familiar ownership practices as is told in some depth in "The Birdie Tales" in 1634: The Ram Rebellion. Further this tale introduces the three active newspapers covering events in the region immediately around Grantville, and details their reporting styles and target audience:

The Street—aiming for a staid financial coverage similar to the Wall Street Journal;
The Grantville Times—which similarly emulates the reserved style of the New York Times;
The Daily News—which is contrasted as flashy and incautious in what it prints, but has an editorial policy championing the idea that the death of any up-timer is an irrevocable and unpardonable loss, and that policies ought to be in place to prevent any up-timer from taking unnecessary risks.

In addition, this tale's finance based theme reports on some other technological advancements in the region only semi-related to the main tale: the establishment in Badenburg of a foundry able to produce crucible steel and achieve high-carbon steels—both necessary for maintaining or replacing tooling, military requirements, and development of other technology (bearings, ball bearings, spring steel, etc.); the establishment of plating capability in Badenburg—with the explicit linkage to the cash-cow of producing table flatware and other more strategic protections over iron and steel artifacts, again ratcheting up the local tech base capabilities.

=== "If the Demons Will Sleep" ===
by Eva Musch

This tale with the personal issues of European refugees falling into the safety of Grantville's expanding hegemony. A man seeks 'New United States' medical assistance for the pending childbirth of his traumatized wife. She has been so abused by her experiences during the Thirty Years' War, that she cannot psychologically stand to be enclosed within four walls. The nurses eventually learn that she was once a captive of the infamous Blood Countess.

=== "Hobson's Choice" ===
by Francis Turner

The story set within the businesses, schools, homes, and pubs of Shakespearian England as word of Grantville's appearance in far off Thuringia reach the English academic and mercantile circles. The tale serves well to illustrate how deeply entwined religion and education were in this age. Much of the story involves real historic characters, and the predominant setting location, The Pickerel pub, claims to be the oldest pub in Cambridge and is still in business.

In the story, a young upwardly mobile son of a merchant takes up "reading as a student" in Cambridge and soon unsurprisingly befriends an attractive young woman — the tavern-keepers young, precocious, vivacious daughter, Bess Chapman — whom he proceeds to share his instruction with as the only way he can spend time with her under her father's watchful eye. In time, his tutoring of the girl becomes a scandal within the society of Cambridge and society of the day, which believes that women cannot be educated, whereas the girl's mastery gives lie to the belief.

When this crisis unfolds, the cities upper, university and merchant classes are meeting and collaborating on forming and funding a fact finding mission to Grantville, to see what they can learn and what is just wild rumor.

=== "Hell Fighters" ===
by Wood Hughes

"Hell Fighters" depicts the concerns of the Roman Catholic Church about the arrival of Grantville and its people. Information about the future, received through up-time publications, raise concerns among the Benedictine religious order about the role and survival of monastic orders in the future. By sending Brother Johann, a German librarian from the region, to Grantville, they hope to arrive at a long-term survival strategy and to discern a pattern in the two divergent histories. This will allow the religious community to take action to alter their order to provide a secular role and benefit to the communities.

=== "Euterpe, Episode 2" ===
by Enrico Toro

"Euterpe" continues to follow Giacomo Carissimi, a musician who feels compelled to investigate Grantville and the rumors of new and wonderful instruments and music. Carissimi narrate his experience through letters back to the home parish in Italy. This episode is written from 'on the road' detailing an expansion of the party by like thinkers and instrument makers in northern Italy and Switzerland, and details a formation of a company including one member of the party joining a local guild (costly) for access to jealously guarded local quality woods. The serial tale becomes intersected in "Euterpe, Episode 3" with David Carrico's "Fran and Marta" tales ("Suite For Four Hands" in the anthology Grantville Gazette V).

=== "An Invisible War, Part 2" ===
by Danita Ewing

(Not in Hardcover and paperback print versions, Part 2 of the serialized story in the ebook, was combined and printed as one inclusion in the print released versions Grantville Gazette II).

This important tale by Danita Ewing establishes canon for the series as Grantville's understaffed medical capabilities struggle to create training and advanced care institutions and begin out-reach to nearby down-time communities in matters bearing on public health and medicine. The story establishes the newly built Lahey Medical Center, several different medical field training programs (Emergency Medical Technician and various nursing programs, Nurse-practitioner programs) and outreach programs in public sanitation and public works for same. Much of the story focuses on the culture clashes experienced—including counter-productive chauvinistic incidents from both up-timer and down-timer characters—during an effort to form a collaborative program to train up-time standards trained physicians at the University of Jena.

== Fact Essays ==
=== "Iron" ===
by Rick Boatright

Boatright's essay focus about the production and use of iron in a modern society.

=== "The Impact of Mechanization on German Farms" ===
by Karen Bergstralh

Bergstralh's essay on the nature of German farms, the economics of mechanization, and the necessary infrastructure to support such technology.

=== "Flint's Lock" ===
by Leonard Hollar, Bob Hollingsworth, Tom Van Natta, and John Zeek

Soon after the release of 1633 internet buzz on Baen's Bar showed a heavy concentration of surprise and queries because the Confederated Principalities of Europe armed forces of Gustavus II Adolphus of Sweden depicted in the novel had been given less advanced firearms than readers had projected, the muzzleloading SRG rifle. Once the Gazettes moved from conceived experiment to implemented trial, this essay—"Flint's Lock" by Grantville Firearms Roundtable members Leonard Hollar, Bob Hollingsworth, Tom Van Natta, and John Zeek—was commissioned by Flint to explain "why a muzzle loading flintlock rifle was chosen, rather than the pet design of every fan, requires a look at many problems faced by the Grantvillers and their understanding of those problems."

The essay discusses the following main issues:

=== "Alchemical Distillation" ===
by Andrew Clark

Andrew Clark's how-to essay, "Alchemical Distillation" is a brief chemical treatise on how processes familiar to the 17th century alchemists can be used to prepare a number of refined and very useful 18th–20th century industrial and final user products such as the analgesic aspirin, purified acetic acid (from "bad wine", that is vinegar), various kinds of tree bark extracts like the familiar 17th century's pine tar—which have very different useful properties, a transformation of pine pitch into turpentine—a basis of better industrial preservatives—especially better paints, sodium acetate, acetic anhydride (a powerful desiccant that could be used (with a lot of care) as an explosive or explosive primer, and so forth. The essay is written as if a local down-timer alchemist has written the text, but included a lot of up-timer English terminology to the benefit of his audience.

== Literary criticism and reception ==
Mark Lardas wrote in The Galveston County Daily News that Grantville Gazette III: "forms a fine introduction to [the series]. Those familiar with [the series] will find Grantville Gazette an indispensable addition to their collection. If you are a fan of alternate history, you will want to read it." William Lawhorn in SFRevu called the collected stories "good" and especially enjoyed Hell Fighter's. Roland Green of Booklist wrote that this book "boasts the same combination of charm and intelligence as its predecessors" and that "Flint's 1632 universe seems to be inspiring a whole new crop of gifted alternate historians."
