= Oneworld (disambiguation) =

Oneworld is an international airline alliance.

Oneworld may also refer to:

- Oneworld Publications, a British independent publishing firm founded in 1986 by Novin Doostdar and Juliet Mabey
- OneWorld.net, a nonprofit web portal about sustainable development and human rights issues around the globe
- Institute for OneWorld Health, a nonprofit pharmaceutical company
- OneWorld, a computer software suite developed by JD Edwards, a company now owned by Oracle Corporation
- OneWorld.press, a Russian start-up opinion platform representing itself as a global think tank.

== See also ==
- One World (disambiguation)
- Our World (disambiguation)
