= Old World (disambiguation) =

The Old World is a term used to distinguish the parts of Africa, Europe, and Asia, or Afro-Eurasia, known to the inhabitants before contact with the Americas.

Old World may also refer to:

- Old World (Warhammer)
- Old World ROM
- Old World (video game), a strategy video game by Mohawk Games
- World order (also Old World Order), the current operating system of the world as opposed to the New World Order conspiracy theory.

== See also ==
- World (disambiguation)
- New World (disambiguation)
