= K. D. Wentworth =

American writer (1951–2012)

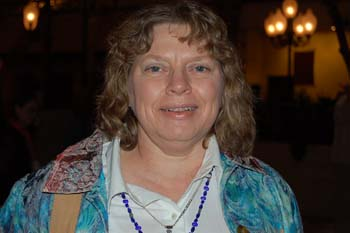
- Wentworth in 2006
- Born: Kathy Diane Wentworth; January 27, 1951; Tulsa, Oklahoma, U.S.
- Died: April 18, 2012 (aged 61); Tulsa, Oklahoma, U.S.
- Education: University of Tulsa
- Occupation: Writer
- Writing career
- Period: 1989–2012
- Genres: Fantasy, Science fiction

Kathy Diane Wentworth (January 27, 1951 – April 18, 2012), known as K. D. Wentworth, was an American science fiction author. A University of Tulsa graduate, she got her start winning the Writers of the Future Contest in 1988, and then later won Field Publications' "Teachers as Writers" Award in 1991. Wentworth served two terms as secretary of the Science Fiction and Fantasy Writers of America in the early 2000s. She served as the editor for the Writers of the Future Contest from 2009 until her death. One of her novelettes, "Kaleidoscope" (2008), and three of her short stories, "Burning Bright" (1997). "Tall One" (1998), and "Born Again" (2005) have been Nebula Award finalists. Wentworth died on April 18, 2012, from complications with pneumonia and cervical cancer.

== Bibliography ==
- "Dust" (Starshore - Summer 1990, Magazine, April 1, 1990; Out of Print)
- "The Tie That Binds" (Figment #7, Magazine, September 1, 1991; Out of Print)
- "Dark of the Moon" (After Hours #13, Magazine, January 1, 1992; Out of Print)
- "Along the Old Rose Trail" (Tomorrow Speculative Fiction - December 1993, Magazine, December 1, 1993; Out of Print)
- "Some Like Them Dead" (Figment #16, Magazine, December 1, 1993; Out of Print)
- The Imperium Game (February 1, 1994; Out of Print)
- Moonspeaker (April 11, 1994, House of Moons Book #1)
- "The Sport of Kings" (Mindsparks #5, Short Story Anthology, September 1, 1994; Out of Print)
- "Night of the Living Bra" (Return to the Twilight Zone, Short Story Anthology, December 1, 1994; Out of Print)
- House of Moons (May 28, 1995, House of Moons Book #2)
- Black on Black (February 1, 1999, Heyoka Blackeagle Book #1; Out of Print)
- Stars over Stars (March 1, 2001, Heyoka Blackeagle Book #2; Out of Print)
- This Fair Land (August 15, 2002; Out of Print)
- The Course of Empire (September 1, 2003, with Eric Flint, Empire Book #1)
- "Here Comes Santa Claus" (Ring of Fire, Short Story Anthology, January 1, 2004; Out of Print)
- The Crucible of Empire (March 1, 2004, with Eric Flint, Empire Book #2)
- "Riverkin" (Fantastic Companions, Short Story Anthology, April 3, 2005)
- "The Rose War" (Twenty Epics, Short Story Anthology, August 1, 2008; Out of Print)
- "Eddie and the King's Daughter" (Ring of Fire II, Short Story Anthology, January 1, 2008; Out of Print)
- "Same, Same" (Front Lines, Short Story Anthology, May 1, 2008; Out of Print)
- "Drinking Problem" (Seeds of Change, Short Story Anthology, August 1, 2008; Out of Print)
