= 1636: Seas of Fortune =

2014 anthology of stories by Iver Cooper

- Author: Iver Cooper
- Cover artist: Tom Kidd
- Language: English
- Series: 1632 series
- Genre: Alternate History /Science fiction
- Publisher: Baen Books
- Publication date: January 7, 2014
- Publication place: United States
- Media type: Print (hardback & paperback)
- Pages: 463 (hardback)
- ISBN: 978-1-4516-3939-1 (hardback)
- OCLC: 857568228

1636: Seas of Fortune is an anthology of short stories written by Iver Cooper and set in the 1632 series. The anthology was released in the United States on January 7, 2014. It is divided into two roughly equal novella-length parts, Stretching Out and Rising Sun. Each part ("braid") consists of several linked ("braided") short stories, seven in the case of Stretching Out and five in Rising Sun. The compilation was published in trade paperback in 2014 and in mass market paperback in 2015. The book received respectable sales. Stretching Out is set in northern South America and the Caribbean while Rising Sun is set in Japan, in the North Pacific, and on the west coast of North America.

Six of the seven Stretching Out stories were previously released electronically in the online version of the Grantville Gazette in serial form, starting with Volume 11 and continuing in six installments until Volume 21. This part contains two threads, one centering on Maria Vorst, a Grantville-trained downtimer who heads an expedition to what is now Suriname to set up a colony that could export rubber, bauxite, minerals, tropical products, and other natural resources that are not obtainable in Europe, but are necessary for sustaining Grantville's industrial development, and the other thread centers on Henrique Pereira da Costa, a Portuguese Marrano (secret Jew), and his half-brother indentured servant Maurício, who initially are roaming the jungles of Brazil in search for rubber trees.

All of the Rising Sun short stories were first published in this anthology. This part is primarily about the expansion of the Japanese empire that is a response to the introduction of history books obtained from Grantville. The main storyline centers on exiling of Japanese Christians to California to found a colony in the vicinity of Monterey Bay that would exploit the resources of North America and also hinder European expansion into the Pacific. This colonization expedition is headed by Date Masamune. Only the first story (Where the Cuckoo Flies) and a portion of the second story (Fallen Leaves) are set in Japan.

== Literary significance and reception ==
The reviewer for SFRevu wrote that "This is a rare collection from a shared universe. There is a fairly low bar to entry as none of the action is truly dependent upon the main action of the Ring of Fire series... Cooper is exploring a part of the world that has been rarely mentioned." The Midwest Book Review writes "Both segues expand the Ring of Fire universe into new or previously limited geography and culture" and "built on real events enhanced by historical speculation but with a nice Grantville twist." Although he "strongly recommends" the book, the reviewer for the Fistful of Wits wrote that he "had not expected it to be a series of mostly interconnected short stories" and that, as could "be expected in a collection of short stories like this one," it didn't tell the whole story of any of the characters involved." Nonetheless, he added that he "liked the settings, liked the characters, and liked where Cooper took them both."

1636: Seas of Fortune barely missed getting listed on the Locus Trade Paperback List in 2014, but did well enough to be labeled as a runner-up.
