= The Grantville Gazette =

2004 anthology of fan fiction stories

Grantville Gazette
- Author: Eric Flint, et al.
- Language: English
- Series: 1632 series
- Genre: Science fiction, alternate history
- Publisher: Baen Books
- Publication date: PB: November, 2004
- Publication place: United States
- Media type: E-book & print (paperback)
- Pages: 361 pages
- ISBN: 0-7434-8860-1
- OCLC: 57403208
- Preceded by: Ring of Fire and 1633
- Followed by: Grantville Gazette II and 1634: The Galileo Affair (novel)

The Grantville Gazette (Grantville Gazette I or more recently, Grantville Gazette, Volume 1) is the first of a series of professionally selected and edited paid fan fiction anthologies set within the 1632 series inspired by Eric Flint's novel 1632. The electronically published the Grantville Gazettes, which were reaching long novel length with regularity, had make up the majority of the series in terms of words in print. Flint as series owner and editor accounts all as canonical. The Science Fiction Writers of America recognizes published stories within the Gazettes as qualified credentials for membership; membership requires a writer to have three published works.

== Series premise ==
The first novel, 1632, and the resultant 1632 series share a common theme, which is to ask the "What if?" questions common to and characteristic of the science fiction genre: "What if a mysterious cosmic event occurred which juxtaposed the location of a whole populated region of West Virginia with a matching portion of early modern Germany?" Flint added another query to his premise: "What if the two places also switched their respective places in time so that the region from our here-now traveled back in space-time to the land and peoples of 369 years ago?" The series lands a fictional town of about 3,000 people (Grantville, West Virginia) in Germany amidst the chaos and disorders of the Thirty Years War.

== Story synopses ==
=== "Portraits" ===
by Eric Flint

The story deals with the decision to smuggle information about antibiotics to hostile forces besieging Amsterdam, where Rebecca Stearns is trapped. It features Anne Jefferson, introduced in S. L. Viehl's Ring of Fire short story "A Matter of Consultation". As well as presenting the moral and ethical issues implicit in aiding the enemy, the story focuses heavily on artist and diplomat Peter Paul Rubens, whose portrait of Jefferson forms the book's cover art. The events of this story are referenced in 1634: The Baltic War and other works in the series.

=== "Anna's Story" ===
by Loren Jones

The story focus on the farmer girl, Anna Braun, who fled from mercenaries who bowled over Police Chief Dan Frost and signaled the arrival of conflict and war at the opening of 1632. It is a poignant story that was just barely cut from Ring of Fire, according to Flint in the forward, mainly because Jones already had another tale in the collection, but also because of space considerations. Ring of Fire is nearly 800 pages long. The story also elaborates on her family's fate, and introduces a lovable if idiosyncratic farmer who finds a new family this side of the Ring of Fire.

=== "Curio and Relic" ===
by Tom Van Natta

The story centers on Paul Santee, a reclusive Vietnam War veteran and gun collector, who lives isolated on the outskirts of Grantville. Set in the weeks immediately after the Ring of Fire, Santee remains unaware of his current situation until being met by Eddie Cantrell, one of several outreach workers combing the remote regions around Grantville to make sure everyone is informed about the Grantville Emergency Committee's edicts, and soliciting resources for the community. Santee learns that Frank Jackson wants him to join Grantville's army as a trainer of cadre, as he has more combat and years of general military experience than everyone else in town put together. Initially, Santee refuses to reenter military service.

Reality intrudes when a band of men ransacks his remote cabin, forcing Santee to realize just how much times have changed and that he is now dependent upon others. He takes a position under Jackson. With the assistance of Eddie Cantrell, he begins to collect and organize the spare arms in the city, organizes an ammunition reloading program, and trains residents to use weapons. Santee and Cantrell stumble upon and fight brigands raiding a nearby farm. The down-timer Germans had chopped down several trees behind the battlefield of the Battle of the Crapper to gauge and evaluate the penetration power of the Grantvillers' firearms, and used the knowledge to create an armored (timberclad) wagon. Under fire from Santee and Cantrell, eight of the rogue ex-mercenaries use the timberclad wagon to close on the position of the two Americans. Realizing their bullets will not penetrate, a wounded Santee bravely orders Cantrell to return to the arsenal and return with an elephant gun while he holds them in check himself. Santee and Cantrell manage to eliminate the brigands with the elephant gun. At the end, Santee agrees to become an unofficial advisor to the military trainers.

=== "The Sewing Circle" ===
by Gorg Huff

"The Sewing Circle" takes a canonical look at the meshing of the resource-limited "New United States" with the extant economy of war-torn central Germany. Four American teenagers try to launch a new industry, waging an uphill battle against adult skepticism as well as the intrinsic difficulty of the project itself. Armed with a father who has become part of Grantville's Finance Subcommittee, the one girl has a dinner conversation involving "Federal Reserve [Bank] Fairies", who magically make more money and regulate the economy.

Grantville, newly arrived in 1631, has some "fast talking" to do to have its money stand up and be negotiable specie. Plastics are surprisingly salable, particularly dolls that a rich nobleman might buy a favorite daughter.

The classmates meet along the banks of a creek. Two, Brent and Trent Partow, are twin brothers, are mechanically inclined, and the fourth, David Bartley, is smitten by Sarah, who pines for one of the twins. The kids realize that resources are very limited, manpower is short, and gearing down is absolutely necessary from the very beginning.

The kids' problems are just beginning. The gap between early 20th century and 17th century manufacturing technology and techniques is vast—particularly for under-experienced would-be twin engineers not yet in high school. David turns out to have a head for organizing and management, and keeps the project moving forward with help from his grandmother. She eventually bankrolls a big piece of the company, while David figures out how to make it pay. Sarah has a grasp of finance beyond her years, and teams with David.

=== "The Rudolstadt Colloquy" ===
by Virginia DeMarce

This story is DeMarce's second fictional foray in the series, and, like "Biting Time", establishes some important canonical underpinnings that draw references, or are extrapolated upon in the various novel sequels. This protestant (Lutheran) colloquy is mentioned often in the first printed major works of the series, and occasionally crops up in the thirteen Gazettes existing solely as e-published works. The Rudolstadt Colloquy as historical background sits at the center of the religious strife between Protestant sects, which in the reader's timeline continued to divide the new churches even as they collectively battled the Roman Catholic dominated world and that church's Counter-Reformation, the effort to reimpose a uniform religion on all of Europe.

At the heart of the matter is the strongly held belief in the authoritarian philosophy, embraced by the nobility and churchmen alike, that a state cannot stand without a uniform official religion. "From the perspective of the princes, religion was important in the 'here and now' because religion here and now was a way of making the population behave." To the modern mind, this seems a curious and perhaps incomprehensible point of view, but the modern man does not embrace the concept either that one class of people was explicitly set above all others and destined from birth to rule. Further, the position and power of all nobles draws from that belief and that of kings being the chosen and anointed protectors of both church and state, regardless of how well or poorly they conduct the business of taking care of the populace at large. Considered in that light, the colloquy and its results will be a major supporting event in the overall 1632 theme championing religious toleration.

In the Rudolstadt Colloquy, internal tensions within the Lutheran community are contrasted and displayed. In addition to their mainstream Lutheran church, Grantville sends representatives from two smaller up-time Lutheran sects, the Missouri Synod and the Evangelical Lutheran Church in America. Throughout Europe, both Catholic and Protestant countries either have heads of state attending in person or by proxy by sending a personal envoy to the long theological debate, which is chaired by the Graf Ludwig Guenther, Count of Schwarzburg-Rudolstadt. Schwarzburg-Rudolstadt happen to be among the very nearest neighbors to Grantville's geographic position. Schwarzburg, in the fictional canon, in fact is so close that the Ring of Fire (ROF) transfer of territory between space-time continuums actually cuts through the outlying houses of the town, and several more that did not go to West Virginia in OTL 2000 AD, slid down the "newly formed" destabilized cliff that resulted immediately after the ROF, as is told in detail in "Schwarza Falls". Towards the end of the novel 1634: The Baltic War, Gustavus II Adolphus of Sweden has charged Graf Ludwig with chairing and adjudicating an even larger colloquy in the city of Magdeburg (The Magdeburg Colloquy) to settle larger issues within his new realm.

== Fact essays ==
=== "They've Got Bread Mold, So Why Can't They Make Penicillin?" ===
by Robert Gottlief

A fact article about the problems and process of identifying and culturing the correct types of mold, and processing and purifying penicillin extract. A story in a later volume includes use of crude penicillin extract, based on real historical uses, and some culture samples found in a lab refrigerator at Grantville High School.

=== "Horse Power" ===
Karen Bergstralh

This essay by Bergstralh discusses horse breeds and their characteristics, common and uncommon to the era of the Thirty Years' War and Europe. Work output, rates and other parameters such as strength, endurance, size, and gaits are discussed.

== Literary significance and reception ==
A reviewer for the Transcendental Basenji Sermons and Enlightenment wrote that this anthology would "almost certain to appeal to (mostly US) SF fans" since the "central conceit is that small town rural ‘plain folks’ Americans uniquely possess all the skills of their ancestors, the American sense of ‘can do’ to be able to survive and prosper in the alien environment of Europe in 1632, as well as possessing intact the political principals of their idealized 1776 fore bearers."

The Grantville Gazette was listed on the Locus magazine Paperback Bestsellers List for two months in a row during 2005, topping at number 9.
