= Peer Impact =

- Developers: Wurld Media, Inc.
- Initial release: 2005-08
- Type: Pay-for-download; Peer-to-peer file sharing
- License: Proprietary

Peer Impact was the name of a pay-for-download file-sharing service created by Wurld Media, Inc.

As the name suggests, it utilized a peer-to-peer distribution system similar to BitTorrent to speed downloads. To compensate users for their bandwidth, Peer Impact paid out cash-credit rewards toward future purchases. Like iTunes, songs on Peer Impact cost $0.99 each. Other media was also available, including radio, video, audio books, and video games.

Peer Impact was launched by Wurld Media in August 2005 with signed digital distribution contracts with four large content providers: Sony BMG Music Entertainment, Universal Music Group, Warner Music Group, and EMI. Wurld Media is the first legally sanctioned digital distributor to sign agreements with all four of these content owners. It also had deals with NBC/Universal, 20th Century Fox, and Warner Bros. Pictures to provide video on demand content.

Although Peer Impact used a peer-to-peer architecture, it maintained centralized control of verification and authorization of downloads to ensure that only legal content was exchanged within the network. This was also important to ensure that content redistributors and copyright owners were appropriately compensated.

Wurld Media, Peer Impact's parent company, was acquired for $4 million by the ROO Group in July 2007.
