= New Worlds =

New Worlds may refer to:

== Publishing ==
- New Worlds (magazine), a British science fiction magazine
- "New Worlds" (comics), a X-Men storyline by Grant Morrison
- New Worlds, an imprint of Caliber Comics

== Music ==
- New Worlds (album), an album by Charlotte Hatherley
- New Worlds, a song on the BBC Radiophonic Music compilation

== Other uses ==
- New Worlds (TV series), an historical drama
- New Worlds Mission, a NASA project
- New Worlds Project, a creative writing project
- Star Trek: New Worlds, a strategy game

== See also ==
- New World (disambiguation)
- The New Worlds Fair, an album by Michael Moorcock and the Deep Fix
