= Mother of Demons =

1997 sci-fi novel by Eric Flint

- Cover of the 1997 edition.
- Author: Eric Flint
- Language: English
- Genre: Science fiction
- Publisher: Baen Books
- Publication date: 1997
- Publication place: United States
- Media type: Print (paperback) & ebook

Mother of Demons is a science-fiction novel by American author Eric Flint. His debut novel, it was published in paperback form in 1997 by Baen Books. It was one of the first books published freely on the web by its author and publisher, as part of an experiment by Eric Flint and Jim Baen which led to more active electronic publishing by both. The story describes the aftermath of the crash of an interstellar starship on a world full of barely biologically compatible primitive but intelligent alien life.

== Storyline ==
On arrival at the planet, the human ship is destroyed in an unexplained accident; the only survivors are the ship's children and a few adults, who escaped on two lifeboat shuttles. They find a highly toxic ecology, and nearly starve to death before discovering accidentally that most humans can safely eat partially digested, regurgitated plant materials produced by the Maia, a race of large semi-intelligent herbivores.

The first part of the story proper introduces the aliens, the Gukuy, described as molluscs but vaguely similar to land-dwelling walking octopuses. They have non-sentient work animals of similar description, and slave semi-sentient Hunnakaku (later seen to be the same as the humans' Maia). Gukuy males are a tiny fraction of the size of Gukuy females, but of similar intelligence. The main Gukuy character, Nukurren, is known as somewhat of a sexual deviant, for having run away with a bonded male partner, Dhowifa, formerly a palace consort and keeping him with her. She is a female, not a breeding "Mother", and few females regularly consort with males. A slave caravan she is helping to guard is attacked by strange, two legged, two armed "Demons" (the humans), and Nukurren and her male are the only Gukuy survivors, who are captured.

Living on a plateau on a large mountain, the humans have gradually become aware of other, more intelligent, and more hostile natives, various factions of the Gukuy. As the children reach adulthood, they begin to interact more and more with the surrounding lands. A large but decaying Gukuy civilization is falling; an honorable warrior tribe is massacred by a cannibalistic barbarian horde. The humans, along with the founders of a modernistic "humanistic" Gukuy religion, outcasts, and the few survivors of the massacre, are forced to work together to defeat the cannibals.

The central human character, Indira Toledo, is one of the few surviving adults and a historian. Though the human population is in dire straits, Indira is extremely reluctant to introduce human ideas of warfare from human history, as she also recalls the violence throughout human history. She is finally convinced that civilization must triumph over barbarism, and by the end of the book turns into a war leader and educator, the "Mother" of the book's title.
