= The World =

The World may refer to:

== Periodicals ==
- The World (Coos Bay), a Coos Bay, Oregon newspaper
- The World (South African newspaper), a former Johannesburg newspaper
- The World (1753 newspaper), a former London newspaper
- The World (journal), a British weekly paper published from 1874 to 1920
- The World (Hobart), a former newspaper published in Hobart, Tasmania
- The World Weekly, an international online newspaper created in 2012

== Literature ==
- The World (book), a philosophy book by René Descartes
- "The World", a fictional lab by Weapon Plus in Marvel Comics
- The World, the name of the Stand used by main antagonist DIO in the manga series JoJo's Bizarre Adventure, named after the Tarot card
- The World: A Brief Introduction, a 2020 book by Richard N. Haass

== Music ==
=== Albums ===
- The World (Bennie K album), 2007
- The World (U.S. Bombs album), 1999
- The World (EP), by 9mm Parabellum Bullet, 2007

=== Songs ===
- "The World" (Angel song), 2013
- "The World" (Brad Paisley song), 2006
- "The World", by Hardwell, 2011
- "The World", by Nightmare from The World Ruler, 2007

== Television shows and episodes ==
- The World (TV program), an Australian news program
- The World with Yalda Hakim, a British news programme
- "The World" (The Amazing World of Gumball), a television episode

== Other media ==
- The World (film), a 2004 Chinese film
- The World (radio program), an American public radio news magazine

== Other uses ==
- MS The World, ship
- The World (archipelago), near Dubai, United Arab Emirates
- The World (Internet service provider)
- The World (nightclub), a defunct nightclub in New York City
- The World (.hack), a fictional game in the franchise .hack
- The World (Tarot card), a Major Arcana in the tarot deck

== See also ==
- World (disambiguation)
