= Ring of Fire (anthology) =

2004 anthology edited by Eric Flint

- Ring of Fire cover art with backdrop of an armored coal truck.
- Author: Eric Flint (ed.) and various others
- Cover artist: Dru Blair
- Language: English
- Series: 1632 series or Ring of Fire
- Subject: Anthology, fiction in a shared universe setting
- Genre: Alternate history, science fiction
- Publisher: Baen Books
- Publication date: January 1, 2004
- Publication place: United States
- Media type: Hardcover
- Pages: 528 pages; 1.6 lb, Physical Description: 6.6"x9.7"x1.6"
- ISBN: 0-7434-7175-X (2004 hardcover); ISBN 1-4165-0908-9 (2005 paperback)
- OCLC: 53145277
- Dewey Decimal: 813/.0876608 22
- LC Class: PS648.F3 R55 2004
- Preceded by: 1633 (novel) (Written in parallel, with crossed plot lines)
- Followed by: 1634: The Galileo Affair (novel) or in time The Grantville Gazette (more anthologies, November–2004)
- Physical Description: 6.6"x9.7"x1.6"; 528 pages; 1.6 lb Edition Info: Physical Description: 6.6"x9.7"x1.6"; Hardcover; 2004-01-01

Ring of Fire is the third published book by editor-author-historian Eric Flint of the 1632 series, an alternate history series begun in the novel 1632 (February 2000). The Ring of Fire is both descriptive of the cosmic event as experienced by the series' characters, but also is at times used as the name for the series itself. The series is set in war-torn Europe during the middle of the Thirty Years' War.

Ring of Fire is a collection of short stories —half by a variety of established science fiction authors invited into the setting, half fan-fiction by enthusiasts who helped take the stand-alone novel into a series numbering works in the tens of books; all set in the universe initially created by Flint's science fiction novel 1632 written as a stand-alone novel and turned into a series by popular demand. Unlike most short works in a novel created series, the stories within are important milieu shaping creations—story threads which are formalized into the series canon for they helped establish it, and act as a spring board for further developments in the books. Many characters debut in these short stories who play an important role in subsequent longer works.

== Premise of the series ==
The series heralds a new kind of writing, blending both shared universe and collaborative fiction writing in large series fiction. As in other shared universes, the stories are set in a milieu shared with other writers, but usually it's done with other author's stories being set safely somewhere off to the side of the main story threads. Flint demonstrated that a series could be successfully written by ignoring convention, and deliberately asking the other writers to share in creating the main threads and plot lines of the milieu. The first two novels in the series, 1632 and 1633, were written contemporaneously so that story threads started in one novel could intermingle and generate matching action or background in the other, and vice versa.

Flint is on record saying that large portions of 1633 were adjusted drastically, even thrown out and rewritten as later submissions to the 1632 series impacted the various and diverse story threads. For a fuller look on this literary development see Assiti Shards series. For the fullest enjoyment of all three books, it is best to read them in the order 1632, Ring of Fire, and then 1633. Interchanging the last two has a relatively minor cost to understanding and in appreciation that can be avoided.

Flint has stated that he intends that short stories featuring major characters, or establishing points that will be important in future novels will be collected into the Ring of Fire anthologies, and that The Grantville Gazettes anthologies will feature the stories of characters that don't establish new background for the novels. However, many of the characters or events become more important in retrospect than either the author or editor expected, so this rule is fairly weak.

== Stories in the anthology ==
=== "In the Navy" ===
by David Weber

Weber's short story sets up major story elements that play out in 1633 and 1634: The Baltic War. In particular, the story tells how the New United States Navy (and that of future Empire of the United States of Europe) came to be in the resource strapped days of 1632–33. Most notably, through the eyes and experiences of young Eddie Cantrell, the story begins the rehabilitation of John Chandler Simpson who was cast as quite unlikeable in 1632. Through the eyes of Simpson, Cantrell and fellow up-timers Jere Haygood and Pete McDougal we get a picture of the chaos involved in rebuilding Magdeburg after the city was sacked by Tilly's forces.

=== "To Dye For" ===
by Mercedes Lackey

To Dye For introduces the absent-minded purveyor of Wacky-Tabbacky Tom Stone and his three boys as he strives for respectability in the eyes of guildmaster Karl Jurgen Edelmann, father of spinster Magdalena Edelmann and main head-over-heels love interest of Tom "Stoner" Stone. As a daughter of a guildmaster, Magdelena Stone was wasting away as a spinster in her early 30s until a delegation from her town visited Grantville and she met her soul-mate, Tom Stone. His initial courting was received with favor, until her father decided "Stoner" wasn't the man of means he'd mistaken him to be.

"Stoner" is the last adult in the former 1970s "Lothlorian Commune" and had been enticed away from Pharmacology graduate school by a hippy "Chick" named Lisa. In the free love community of Lothlorien, whether "Elrond" (Ronald Stone) might be his child is a question he has long abandoned, but it is genetically certain that the "Stop sign red" colored hair of "Gwaihir" (Gerry Stone) makes him someone else's boy, who is nonetheless being raised as one of his own.

As this story opens, a glum Stoner is introduced to Dr. James Nichols by Mike Stearns, and the two have come by to pick up a horse-drawn cart load of Stoner's "patented West Virginia Wildwood Weed" (which originated in a pilgrimage to Holland) that Stoner uses as an emergency cash crop grown in his ramshackle home-made greenhouse constructed from various junk automobile sections, windows thrown in the trash, and a lot of effort and ingenuity. At the same time, interjected into this conversation are barbs by the German boy driving the horse cart just identified as 'Klaus' such as "Und Magdalena vould haf better prospects elsewhere, you haf no income, Stoner. Effen der Veed, you gifs to der Doc".

Stoner, who is particularly adept with recreational extra-sensory stimulatory compounds, especially as a pharmacological graduate school drop-out from Purdue University, refuses to take payment for the weed, saying repeatedly that he wouldn't make money off of other people's pain. Klaus turns even that negative: "Dat earns you a place in Heaffen, maybe, but on Earth, no income." The matter becomes the topic of a general family discussion after the medical visitors have left, brought up by the boys. Soon, the family conference reminds Stoner of a past fiasco at a town fair where a cloud-burst had ruined the sales of many exotically tie-dyed tee-shirts, also ruining what would have been a great day as the tee-shirts hadn't been processed to set the dye into the cloth—inadvertently dyeing many a now irate customer. But Stoner knew how to make things colorfast, he was a very good chemist, and had loads of left over dyes here and there on the grounds.

Soon, with the boys' eager help, the Stones go into the serial production of embroidery yarns. Karl Edelman is impressed and Stoner has a new life partner, one with a ruthless business savvy that he'd never had. As the story closes, Stoner is recalling the history of early organic dyes leading up to the Mauve Decade, when coal-tar dyes such as Perkin's mauve were developed and generated huge fortunes. The neat thing is it would be ecologically sound, for the dyes needed could be taken from the coal-fired power plant with the addition of scrubbers on the chimneys. Splitting the profits bothered Stoner not a bit. They would be huge.

impact on the milieu

In the after-story, the sequel 1634: The Galileo Affair, Magda accompanies her antibiotic analgesic and clothing dye wizard of a husband to a year-long posting to lecture at the University of Padua, as part of the Embassy sent to Venice. There, she takes her husband's wealth and shows the business acumen learned at her father's side and a shrewd judgment of men and ruthlessness which built it into a fortune, and turns the couple into the wealthiest family in Europe with the able assistance of Sharon Nichols, who builds up a considerable fortune of her own.

=== "A Lineman For the Country" ===
by Dave Freer

Scottish military dispatch carrier Douglas Lawrey falls in with telephone repairman Len Tanner and irascible coal mine switchboard operator Ellie Anderson. Due to their limited people skills, the technologically stranded pair have been unable to convince anyone to develop telecommunications abilities beyond Grantville. After Ellie reveals the old-tech phone she has been prototyping, Douglas talks them into forming a corporation.

While stringing the first phone line to nearby Saalfeld, Len and a downtime assistant are captured by a group planning to hijack a Grantville gun shipment. In the struggle, the prototype phone is damaged, but the trussed up Len finds the battery and wires and manages to send an SOS to Grantville.

After foiling the hijack, Ellie realizes that the old-tech phone was still too high tech for the time period. Morse keys can be manufactured quickly, and investors found to fund the telegraph wire network.

=== "Between the Armies" ===
by Andrew Dennis

Set before and during the Croatian attack on Grantville, this story revolves around the Catholic Church. Papal diplomat Monsignor (not yet Cardinal) Mazarini sends Jesuit Father Heinzerling to report on Grantville. Due to political issues with Rome, France and Spain, Mazarini cannot open diplomatic discussions, so when Heinzerling returns, he unofficially sends him back to be the curate for Grantville's Catholic church. Uptimer Irene Flannery, a faithful but harsh elderly widow who has always helped the church, is horrified and offended by Heinzerling's girlfriend and three children, even after Father Mazarre marries them. Irene quits her charity work and becomes entirely isolated. She refuses to take shelter during the Croatian attack, and dies in her front yard. Father Mazarre is wracked by guilt, as well as anger that the current wars all claim to be for the sake of religion. He resolves not to stand by silently any more, and sends his uptime Catholic books to the Vatican.

=== "Biting Time" ===
by Virginia Easley DeMarce

Veronica Richter (Hans and Gretchen Richter grandmother) gets fake teeth, opens a daycare center/preparatory academy and is courted by Henry Dreeson.

=== "Power to the People" ===
by Loren K. Jones

A technically plausible description of what happens at the power plant in the immediate aftermath of the Ring of Fire event. There is panic, of course, but also resourcefulness as the plant's staff struggles to recover from an event they don't understand.

=== "A Matter of Consultation" ===
by S. L. Viehl

"A Matter of Consultation" by veteran science fiction author S. L. Viehl expands on the character Sharon Nichols created by Flint, who becomes one of the lead characters in both 1633 and the South European thread's two novels, 1634: The Galileo Affair and 1635: The Cannon Law. Also in "A Matter of Consultation" Viehl introduces the nurse Ann Jefferson, a classmate of Nichols whom he pairs with Nichols in this story. Flint later will make her into an American poster girl of sorts in his purpose written short stories in each of the Grantville Gazettes I, II and III where she is caught up in the Siege of Amsterdam and ends up as the common subject of many famous down-time artists starting with Peter Paul Rubens and including Rembrandt, who is a virtual unknown at the time. Those three stories set canon for increased information flow and detail the beginning of a common postal system across Europe.

Viehl has Nichol's and Jefferson face off against Dr. William Harvey, the "discoverer" of the circulatory system, and the two nurses "give him some pointers", including a severe dressing down. Concurrently, Anne Jefferson meets her future husband, diplomat and mathematician Adam Olearius, who is traveling as diplomat and guide to Harvey in this story. In canonical importance, Dr. Harvey visits Grantville, and its libraries, and as a courtesy, has some medical books copied for him. While killing time he discovers encyclopedias and has pages detailing English History copied at the end of his stay. Charles I of England uses these warnings of the revolution to change England to repress the future revolution, thus setting the stage for the English international politics in the series.

=== "Family Faith" ===
by Anette M. Pedersen

Johannes Grünwald, an artist forced by his mother's family to become a Jesuit priest, returns hunted, poor and starving to his family estate near Grantville. Johannes is welcomed by his old playmate Frank Erbst, who is now caring for the estate.

The Grünwald family has a complex religious history. Johannes' stiff-necked Protestant brother Marcus allowed his beloved Catholic wife to raise their son Martin Catholic. After his wife's death, however, Marcus tried to force Martin and his wife Louisa to baptise their son Johann as a Protestant. To escape, Martin joined Tilly's army. Due to the turmoil of war, young Johann went missing. He is believed to be in Grantville, but Marcus regards Grantville as evil and has forbidden Frank to go there.

Johannes explains that he lost faith after the sack of Magdeburg and was unable to continue his task of drawing pictures of the war. He was arrested for heresy and blasphemy, and placed under guard. He escaped and walked to the estate, but the corpses he found in farmhouses along the way tormented him. Frank gives drawing materials to Johannes, who wrestles with his demons. When soldiers arrive on the estate, Johannes expects to be taken prisoner. However, they are Americans, and they take him back to Grantville.

=== "When the Chips are Down" ===
by Jonathan Cresswell and Scott Washburn

"When the Chips are Down" explores some of the issues involved in "gearing down". Larry Wild is one of the Four Musketeers introduced midway through the novel 1632, and is the central character in this tale. Larry's employment in one of Grantville's machine shops goes poorly: he demonstrates a regrettable inconsistency and an inability to pay proper and timely attention, and so breaks valuable and irreplaceable machine tool cutting heads. Most of the story involves preparations for a Christmas celebration which Larry presses forward with despite experience and difficulties. While trying to recreate a formerly enjoyed uptime snack, there are humorous adverse interactions with members of the extended family of Jeff Higgins and Gretchen Higgins, especially her formidable grandmother Veronica Richter.

=== "American Past Time" ===
by Deann Allen and Mike Turner

Former star high school athletes decide to start a baseball league and try to interest downtimers in the sport.

=== "Skeletons" ===
by Greg Donahue

Downtimer Gerd is concerned that many Germans who were formerly Tilly's soldiers have been welcomed into Grantville's army. He recognizes a trio that he served with, whose atrocities sickened him until he fled the group. The trio deserts, taking their valuable uptime guns and robbing several Grantville houses to get ammunition. Gerd knows their destination: a farm where they tortured and killed an old man for his wealth, then hid the loot in an outhouse. He ambushes them, and the loot is donated to a Grantville church.

=== "A Witch to Live" ===
by Walt Boyes

Veronica Junius, daughter of the burgomaster of Bamberg burned as a witch, is also been tortured and found guilty of witchery by ecclesiastical court. She escapes, but is captured. Inquisitor Eberhardt suggests taking her to Würzburg for civil trial before she can be burned, but the Captain insists on bringing her to Suhl, where she will have no friends to aid her. Jesuit Friedrich von Spee, historical author of a treatise against using torture in witchcraft trials, is asked by the prince-bishop of Mainz to observe.

Suhl has been accepted into the United States, and Veronica's previous trial is found invalid there due to the forced confession. She is sent to Grantville "for a new trial," where she is given medical treatment and comforted by Father Mazarre. She explains that in the four years since her father was burned and all his property seized, she could only support herself via prostitution. Discussing witch hunts, Mazarre recalls a historical figure that they should recruit — von Spee, who then introduces himself.

=== "The Three R's" ===
by Jody Dorsett

Due to the Counter-Reformation, The Unity of the Brethren church has been expelled from Liechtenstein and Bohemia, and driven underground in Poland. Trying to keep the church alive in exile, Bishop Comenius sends Deacon Billek to Grantville to see if they can help. Grantville and the Brethren agree on two important issues: religious tolerance and education. Billek finds that Grantville cannot assist the Brethren where they are, but offers sanctuary for any refugees. However, union agitator Red Sybolt is moved by their plight, and accompanies Billek on his return trip to teach the three R's: "reading, righting and revolution."

=== "Here Comes Santa Claus" ===
by K. D. Wentworth

Julie MacKay arranges a Christmas party for the many orphans in the area. While preparations for this event quickly snowball, three emissaries from Wallenstein are sent to find her. Meanwhile, two of the Emperor's soldiers decide to blow up Grantville's school with two powderkegs. At the denouement, the attack is foiled and Pappenheim explains that Wallenstein simply wants an alliance with Grantville and new teeth from Julie's dentist father.

=== "The Wallenstein Gambit" ===
by Eric Flint

Flint's novelette set in December 1632—Spring 1633, is the basis for a major plot thread in the milieu, the Eastern European thread. In the 1632-verse, Albrecht von Wallenstein was near-fatally wounded by the sniper fire of sharp shooting Julie Sims at the fictional Battle of Alte Veste. Wallenstein decides he'd prefer to ally with Gustavus and the Americans rather than face the assassination the Americans' history books have him slated for in 1634. He'd also rather not face them or Gustavus again in battle, and in particular not the American rifles which tore up his jaw and put him in declining health since he could not ingest solids. His mutilated jaw was also the reason that he allied with his former enemies as believed that only the American's medical health care could fix his jaw (see "Here Comes Santa Claus").

He plots (together with Gottfried Pappenheim) to expel imperial administrators from Bohemia and depose the absent Archduke Ferdinand III of Austria, then also king of Hungary (1625) and Bohemia (1629) whilst he was occupied opposing the Ottoman Empire while his father Ferdinand II prosecuted the Thirty Years' War triggered by his reign in Bohemia. Meanwhile, Len Tanner and Ellie Anderson (see "Lineman for the Country") come to install a telephone system for Wallenstein's residence in Prague, and a Jewish couple from Grantville settles in Prague and gains influence in Josefov, the Jewish quarter.

Wallenstein's coup succeeds, but he must take his troops out of Prague to meet Ferdinand's army in a "Second Battle of White Mountain". Mercenary chief Heinrich Holk decides to exploit their absence and attack the city. However, successors of religious hussites ("The Brethren") and the Jewish population band together as citizen defenders of Prague, led by elderly American tycoon Morris Roth, who amazes himself by becoming a popular leader: don Morris, hidalgo of Jews.

At the heart of the storyline backplot and that of Flint's Eastern European thread is the Chmielnicki Rebellion, refers to a rebellion or war of liberation in the Polish–Lithuanian Commonwealth (present-day Ukraine), which raged from 1648–1654 and involved massive antisemitic pogroms. Many of the Jews targeted had fled central and western Europe because the plague years in the 14th century had inspired pogroms, as did the spread of Lutheranism which was at the heart of the Thirty Years' War.

The Khmelnytsky Uprising decimated the Jewish population and is considered to be one of the most traumatic events in Jewish history. In The Wallenstein Gambit storyline, Jewish character Morris Roth is haunted by this and hopes to prevent the prospective loss of life.

== Literary significance and reception ==
Publishers Weekly mentions "how neatly the other authors' tales in this strong anthology dovetail with Flint's series" and how the "individual contributors concentrate less on the impact that the displaced Americans' technology makes than on how their ideas—and ideals—inspire those newly exposed to them". Jackie Cassada of the Library Journal called the book a "topnotch choice for alternate history fans and essential for libraries owning 1632 and 1633" and that these "15 stories contribute directly to the main plot lines of the series and illustrate the complex and multifaceted nature of historical fiction."

Ring of Fire was listed on the Locus (magazine) Hardcovers Bestsellers List for two months in a row during 2004, topping at number 2.

== See also ==
- Ring of Fire II
- Ring of Fire III
