= Nash Mir =

Nash Mir (Our World) was a Menshevik weekly journal published in St. Petersburg, Russia, in January and February 1907.
