= Wurld Media =

- Company type: Private
- Founded: September 1999; 25 years ago
- Founders: Gregory Kerber; Kirk Feathers
- Defunct: January 2008
- Headquarters: Saratoga Springs, New York, United States
- Parent: ROO Group Inc. (2007-2008)

Wurld Media was a privately held company based in Saratoga Springs, NY by Gregory Kerber and Kirk Feathers in September 1999.

== Overview ==
The company set out to create and manage systems to leverage online markets. Its first product was launched in 2001. Wurld Media's initial consumer product, Grow Hope, created an online marketing opportunity for nonprofit organizations to reach new and existing supporters with an online solution for earning additional donations through e-commerce purchases.

== Product claims ==
A second product, BuyersPort, grew out of Grow Hope. Combined, they power the HelpUSA program to allow online shoppers to support nonprofit causes at no cost to the consumer. By private labeling, the BuyersPort/Grow Hope platform and membership program, nonprofit partners such as the Child Safety Network, the Elizabeth Glaser Pediatric AIDS Foundation, and the Arthritis Foundation have created an affinity program for their supporter base.

BuyersPort is a commercial online marketplace consisting of more than 500 of the Internet's top retailers, including Expedia, eBay, Dell, Overstock, and Barnes & Noble. The difference between BuyersPort and other online shopping malls is that BuyersPort members earn cash back from their purchases. Partners include Priceline.com, Expedia.com, Travelocity.com, Orbitz, Overstock.com, Dell, Barnes & Noble, eBay, Staples, JCPenney, The Home Depot, Gap, Nordstrom, Circuit City, and others.

BuyersPort was used by StreamCast in 2002 to help create an online shopping experience for Morpheus users. Although Morpheus is ad-supported, many users were not happy with the way a browser helper object named Wurld Media redirected specific web addresses to BuyersPort member sites.

Continuing to seek out high-growth consumer markets, Wurld Media launched a third product in March 2003, LX Systems. LX Systems was envisioned as a distributive computing technology to help multimedia providers efficiently market and distribute content to millions of consumers on the Internet. LX Systems uses the same peer-to-peer architecture utilized by BitTorrent. LX Systems first customer was the US Army's recruiting video game, America's Army.

With a scalable and secure content distribution technology under their belt, company founders Kerber and Feathers said they saw an opportunity in the emerging pay-for-play Internet music marketplace of 2004–2005, and launched the media file sharing service Peer Impact in August 2005. Peer Impact is a legal pay-for-download file-sharing service which utilizes a peer-to-peer distribution system similar to BitTorrent to speed downloads of digital media, including radio, video, audio books, and video games. The company claimed to have had digital distribution contracts with four large content providers: Sony BMG Music Entertainment, Universal Music Group, Warner Music Group, and EMI. Wurld Media also has signed agreements with NBC Universal, 20th Century Fox, and Warner Bros. Pictures to provide video on demand content.

== Closure ==
The company experienced major financial difficulties, leading to the owners selling the company in 2007 to New York City-based ROO Group Inc. (now KIT digital, Inc.) for $4.3 million, which subsequently shutdown the Clifton Park, New York office and laid off all employees in January 2008.

Soon after the sale, the Saratoga County, New York district attorney brought criminal charges of falsifying business records against principal Gregory Kerber. In a plea bargain, Gregory Kerber pleaded guilty to the charges in June 2008 and was sentenced to serve up to 3 years in prison.
