= Orkestra RTM =

- Broadcast orchestra
- Former name: Orkes Radio Malaya (1961–1963); Orkes Radio Malaysia (1963–1969)
- Founded: April 1, 1961; 65 years ago
- Location: Angkasapuri, Kuala Lumpur, Malaysia
- Music director: Mokhzani Ismail

Orkestra RTM (English: RTM Orchestra) is a Malaysian broadcast orchestra based in Angkasapuri, Kuala Lumpur, owned and operated by Radio Televisyen Malaysia (RTM) and maintained by its Music Service Division. Founded in 1961, it produces and performs orchestra-based entertainment programs as well as performed in various music events in Malaysia and abroad. It is the oldest musical orchestra in Malaysia. As of 2022, the orchestra consists of 130 musicians and instrumentalists.

== History ==
Orkestra RTM was established on 1 April 1961 as the radio orchestra of the Radio Malaya and originally known as Orkes Radio Malaya. Ahmad Nawab was one of its founding musician while Ahmad Merican was its first music director. It began operations at the Federal House in Jalan Raja, Kuala Lumpur, with the concept of a big band consisting of 13 members who were focused on the musical instrument family known as brasa (trumpet), saxes (saxophone) and rhythm (drum). Following the establishment of Malaysia on 16 September 1963, Orkes Radio Malaya renamed as Orkes Radio Malaysia.

By 1965, the orchestra's membership increased to 25 with the addition of string musicians. From 1967 to 1969, its membership then increased to 38 with the orchestra studio concept. When Radio Malaysia and Televisyen Malaysia merged to become Radio Televisyen Malaysia (RTM) in October 1969, Orkes Radio Malaysia changed its name again to Orkestra RTM and relocated from Jalan Raja to Angkasapuri. During the 1970s, the orchestra have performed with Indonesian musicians like Bing Slamet and Titiek Puspa.

Between the late 1970s and early 1980s, the RTM Orchestra went on dark period when many of its musicians had left, leaving the ensemble with only 12 members. In 1984, Ahmad Dassilah become the new Music Director and reunited over 30 successful musicians. Between 1980s and 1990s, the orchestra performed at the live concerts such as the Puspasari (1981), Rampaisari (1992), and Senandung Serumpun (1993). In 2002, the orchestra performed live at the RTM musical programme, Getaran, where they performs instrumental songs or songs with accompanying popular singers.

The orchestra celebrates its 50th anniversary on 1 April 2011. As part of its Golden Jubilee, the orchestra organised and performed at the Konsert Gemilang 50 Orkestra RTM at the Auditorium Perdana, Angkasapuri, Kuala Lumpur on 3 October 2011. Among artistes performed at the concert including Jamal Abdillah, Noryn Aziz and Andre Goh. In 2020, the RTM Orchestra made history by becoming the first orchestra in Malaysia to perform from home during the COVID-19 pandemic.

== Music directors and conductors ==
- Tan Sri Ahmad Merican (1961)
- Alfonso Soliano (1961–1965)
- Gus Steyn (1967–1969)
- Johari Salleh (1965–1983)
- Ahmad Dasillah (1984–1999)
- Ruslan Mohd. Imam (1978–1995)
- Mokhzani Ismail (1999–present)

== Accolades ==
In 2011, Orkestra RTM received recognition from The Malaysia Book of Records as the longest-running musical orchestra in Malaysia.
