= This World =

This World may refer to:

- This World (TV series), a BBC television series
- "This World" (Selah Sue song), 2011
- "This World", a song by the Dream Academy from their 1985 eponymous album
- "This World", a song by Earshot from their 2002 debut album Letting Go
- "This World", a 2004 single by Slam also featured on the album Year Zero
- This World (band), an American band
  - This World (This World album), 1996
- This World (Watter album), 2014

== See also ==
- This World Alone, a 2018 American film
