= Our World =

Our World may refer to:

- Our World, a magazine for African-American readers founded by John P. Davis and published from 1946 to 1957
- Nuestro Mundo, translated to English as Our World, the first gay rights organization in Latin America

== Music ==
- Our World (album), a 2009 album by T.O.K.
- Our World: Fallen, a 2007 album by FLAME
- Our World: Redeemed, a 2008 album by FLAME
- "Our World", by James from Yummy, 2024

== Television shows ==
- Our World (1967 TV program), the first worldwide live satellite TV program in 1967
- Our World (1986 TV program), a 1986–1987 American television news program exploring historical events
- Our World (2007 TV program), a UK feed and international feed of BBC News documentary series

== See also ==
- Nash Mir, a 1907 Russian periodical
- Our World, Our Way, album by Dem Franchize Boyz
