= New World (disambiguation) =

The New World is a reference to the Americas and Oceania.

It may also refer to:

== Film and television ==
- New World (1995 film), a French film about post–World War II France
- The New World (1957 film), a Mexican drama film
- The New World (2005 film), a film by Terrence Malick
- The New World (2011 film), an Estonian documentary film
- New World (2013 film), a South Korean crime drama film
- New World (South Korean TV series)
- "The New World" (The 4400 episodes)
- "The New World" (Torchwood), a 2011 episode of Torchwood
  - Torchwood: Miracle Day or Torchwood: The New World
- "The New World" (Star Wars Resistance)

== Music ==
- New World Records, a record label
- New World Symphony (orchestra), a training academy for orchestra musicians
- New World (band), a band from the 1970s

=== Albums ===
- A New World Record, a 1976 album by ELO, Electric Light Orchestra
- New World (Joe Chambers album) (1976)
- New World (Stanley Cowell album) (1981)
- New World (Karla Bonoff album) (1988)
- New World (The Zombies album) (1990)
- New World (Do As Infinity album) (2001)
- The New World (Bruce Robison album) (2008)
- New World (Lauri Ylönen album) (2011)
- New World (Dave Kerzner album) (2014)
- The New World (Tony Oxley album) (2023)
- New Worlds (album), by Charlotte Hatherley (2009)
- New World, a 1990 album by The Kelly Family
- New World, a 2014 album by Lego Big Morl

=== Songs ===
- "New World" (Strawbs song) (1972)
- "New World" (L'Arc-en-Ciel song) (2005)
- "New World" (Sun Nan song) (2017)
- "The New World", a 1983 song by X from More Fun in the New World
- "New World", a 1992 song by Soul Asylum from Grave Dancers Union
- "New World", a 1996 song by Prince from Emancipation
- "New World", a 2000 song by Björk from Selmasongs
- "New World", a 2005 song by tobyMac
- "New World", a 2011 song by Sistar from So Cool
- "New World", a 2011 song by Charice from Infinity
- "New World", a 2018 song by Krewella and Yellow Claw ft. Vava
- "New World", a 2022 song by Ateez from The World EP.1: Movement
- "The New World", a 2011 song by The Drums

== Organisations ==
- New World (group) or New World Hackers, a hacktivist group
- New World (France), an organized caucus in the French Socialist Party
- New World School of the Arts, a magnet high school in Miami-Dade County, Florida
- New World University, an institution in the Commonwealth of Dominica

=== Companies ===
- New World (supermarket), a New Zealand supermarket chain
- New World Amusement Park, former amusement park in Singapore
- New World Department Store (Bangkok), a former department store and shopping mall in Thailand
- New World Department Store China, a department store chain in China
- New World Development, a Hong Kong–based real estate company
- New World First Bus, a former Hong Kong–based bus operator
- New World Pasta, a food manufacturer in the US
- New World Pictures, a production company in the US
- New World Telecommunications, a former Hong Kong–based fixed line provider
- Hotel New World, a hotel in Singapore that collapsed in 1986
- Sun Ferry, formerly known as New World First Ferry until 7 January 2021, a Hong Kong–based ferry service company

== Publishing ==
- The New World (American newspaper), a New York newspaper of the 1830s and 1840s
- The New World (British newspaper), a British newspaper formerly named The New European
- The New World (short story collection), a collection of short stories by Russell Banks
- "The New World" (short story), a short story by Patrick Ness
- Catholic New World, a newspaper of the Diocese of Chicago in the United States
- New World Press, a Chinese book publisher
- New World Translation, the primary Bible translation used by Jehovah's Witnesses
- The World Tomorrow (magazine) or The New World, a 1918-1934 political magazine
- New World, a set of three science fiction books by James Kahn

== Other uses ==
- New World ROM, Macintosh computers that do not have a Macintosh Toolbox ROM chip
- New World (video game), 2021 video game
- New World, a brand of cooking appliances owned by Glen Dimplex
- The New World (sculpture), a sculpture by Tom Otterness
- In One Piece, the second half of the Grand Line is referred to as the New World.

== See also ==
- New World Order (disambiguation)
- New Worlds (disambiguation)
- Old World (disambiguation)
- 新世界 (disambiguation)
