= 1634: The Galileo Affair =

2004 novel by Eric Flint

- Cover art
- Author: Eric Flint and Andrew Dennis
- Cover artist: Thomas Kidd
- Language: English
- Series: 1632 series, aka Ring of Fire series, or Assiti Shards series
- Genre: Alternate history, science fiction
- Publisher: Baen Books
- Publication date: HC: 1st printing April 2004; PB: July 26, 2005 (reprint edition)
- Publication place: United States
- Media type: Print (hardcover and paperback), e-book
- Pages: 549 (HC); 688 (PB)
- ISBN: 978-1-4165-2102-0 (HC); ISBN 978-0-7434-9919-4 (PB)
- OCLC: 53967341
- Dewey Decimal: 813/.54 22
- LC Class: PS3556.L548 A618 2004
- Preceded by: Ring of Fire
- Followed by: The Ram Rebellion; Direct Plot thread sequel: 1635: The Cannon Law

1634: The Galileo Affair is the fourth book and third novel published in the 1632 series. It was co-written by American authors Eric Flint and Andrew Dennis, and was published in 2004. The book follows the activities of an embassy party sent from the United States of Europe (Grantville) to Venice, Italy, where the three young Stone brothers become involved with the local Committees of Correspondence and the Inquisition's trial of Galileo Galilei.

== Plot summary ==
Following Grantville's alliance with Gustavus Adolphus and their military successes, texts of modern-day history books of the seventeenth century have become very popular among the powerful personages of Europe and made dramatic effects and turmoil on the continent. Among those that are affected are the Holy Roman Catholic Church with their religious holdings. Father Lawrence Mazzare started the controversy by allowing Father Fredrich von Spee to read his own entry in the Catholic Encyclopedia, thereby stiffening the Jesuit's resistance to the Inquisition. Also Mazzare provided copies of the papers of the Second Vatican Council and other documents to Monsignor Giulio Mazarini, which led Pope Urban VIII to request a summary of Catholic theological reforms over the following centuries in the original timeline.

The newly formed USE acts to open a trade corridor with the Middle East via Venice to insure supplies of materials unavailable within Western Europe; gaining political allies within these regions; and religious allies to spread the doctrines of religious tolerance and the separation of church and state. Michael Stearns selects Lawrence Mazzare to lead the delegation to Venice because of his current fame (or notoriety) among Catholics. Mazzare asks Simon Jones, the Methodist minister, to accompany him as a sign of religious tolerance and Father Augustus Heinzerling. Jones goes along as Mazzare's assistant. Stearns also sends Tom Stone and his family to assist with the production of pharmaceuticals, Sharon Nichols to aid in medical education (and to give her something useful to do while she is grieving over Hans Richter's death in 1633), and Ernst Mauer to advise on public sanitation. Lieutenant Conrad Ursinus is sent as the naval attaché and advisor on shipbuilding and Scottish Captain Andrew Lennox is assigned as the military attaché and commander of the Marine Guard. Lieutenant Billy Trumble is sent as XO of the Marine escort as well as sports advisor. However, the delegation is opposed by the French embassy in Venice led by Claude de Mesmes, comte d'Avaux, who is given orders by Cardinal Richelieu to disrupt trade negotiations between the USE and Venice.

== Literary significance and reception ==
Publishers Weekly in their review said that "It's refreshing to read an alternate history where the problems of two people do amount to a hill of beans, which isn't surprising, since all the installments in this popular series to date have focused as much on ordinary people as on kings and generals. The closing chase sequence is literally a riot." School Library Journal was mixed in their review, saying, "this is a good choice for fans of alternative history, although those who prefer the more serious work of Harry Turtledove may find it too upbeat for their taste. Also, familiarity with previous titles is a must as the authors place readers right in the middle of the action." Booklist noted that the book is "challenging for newcomers, but Young Adults who know the series will enjoy this latest installment" and it would help if the reader had the previous books available.

1634: The Galileo Affair was the first book in the 1632 series to be listed on the New York Times Best Seller list for hardcover fiction. In April 2004, the book stayed on the NY Times list for a period of two weeks, peaking at number 27.

1634: The Galileo Affair was also the first book in the 1632 series to be listed at the top of the Locus Hardcovers Bestsellers List, which it did for the month of July in 2004. It also reached number 3 while staying on the Locus Paperbacks Bestsellers List for two months in 2005.
