= One World Channel =

Satellite television channel

One World Channel was a Norwegian-based, Danish-backed satellite television channel catering to the Third World. The channel's operating company, All Europe Satellite Television, was founded in London in January 1987; it used a satellite base in Norway to deliver its service. Tvind was a major backer.

Positioned as "the voice of the Third World", it started broadcasting in May 1989 and delivered its service over the same transponder as TV5 Europe during the morning. Its directors were Jesper Wohlert and Lars Jorgensen.

The channel produced programmes in Danish and were carried with English subtitles. It also aired programmes submitted by broadcasters from Third World countries. On 11 October 1989, its programming was limited to an interview followed by a speech from Tanzanian president Julius Nyerere. Participation was free of charge and the involved broadcasters would only deliver content of their own choice. RTM from Malaysia was one of its contributors; an agreement was finalised in early 1990. As of 1991, the channel was available in fifteen million European households and was already airing the United Nations programme World Chronicles, originally only aimed at North America.

Late in its existence, the channel was building a possible "African window", which it hoped to expand to two hours in 1992 and three hours in 1993. This implied African broadcasters had to submit more content.

The channel ceased operating in September 1992.
