= 1634: The Baltic War =

2007 novel by David Weber and Eric Flint

- Author: Eric Flint and David Weber
- Cover artist: Tom Kidd
- Language: English
- Series: 1632 series
- Genre: Science fiction
- Publisher: Baen Books
- Publication date: May 1, 2007 (e-book) & (hardback); November 1, 2008 (paperback)
- Publication place: United States
- Media type: Print (hardback) and e-book
- Pages: 448 pages
- ISBN: 1-4165-2102-X e-book ID: SKU: 141652102X
- Preceded by: 1633
- Followed by: 1634: The Bavarian Crisis

1634: The Baltic War is a sequel to both the first-of-type sequels, Ring of Fire and 1633, co-written by American authors Eric Flint and David Weber, and published in 2007. It had to await schedule co-ordination by the two authors, which proved difficult and delayed the work by nearly two years.

The book continues the "Main" or Central European thread centered on the newly organized United States of Europe birthed in Central Germany under the protection-by-arms of Emperor Gustavus Adolphus (in the previous novel, 1633) and in particular, the role of the citizens of Grantville, now of Thuringia, and the capital city of Magdeburg have to play on the world stage. With the stability imposed by the protection of Gustavus's armies, "up-timers" began migrating to other locales in the "neohistories" world as the year 1633 closed.

This "second half novel" wraps up two plot threads left hanging in Flint and Weber's 1633 (2002): the resolution of the captive Grantville diplomatic mission that Charles I is holding in the Tower of London, and how Admiral Simpson's awkward looking fleet of ironclad warships managed to get out of the Elbe past the Imperial Free City of Hamburg to effect the lifting of Siege of Luebeck. The book also details ground battles as the Americans have been busy upgrading Gustavus's army into a highly trained professional army at the expense of the mercenaries so prevalent in the era.

== Literary significance and reception ==
Publishers Weekly called the book "exciting" and said that the authors "emphasize the effect that the ideas of liberty, equality and the rule of law have" in the shaping the transition from absolutism to democracy. Although the reviewer for SFRevu gave a mostly positive review, he wrote that the book "does have a feel of being unfocused" since there "are a large and growing number of characters to follow." The reviewer for the Midwest Book Review wrote that the "fast-paced storyline contains several fronts in which the advanced twenty-first technology plays key roles in the war, but it is a psychological and philosophical battle for the minds and hearts of the people that is perhaps more critical to the cause of freedom and democracy."

1634: The Baltic War is the second book in the 1632 series to be listed on the New York Times Best Seller list for hardcover fiction. In May 2007, the book stayed on the NY Times list for two weeks, peaking at number 19.

1634: The Baltic War also appeared on the Locus Hardcovers Bestsellers List for two months in a row during 2007, peaking at number 2, and also later on the Paperbacks Bestsellers List for a single month in 2009 at number 8.

== Main (Central Europe) thread ==
- Novel: 1632, 2000
- Novel: 1633, 2003
- Anthology: Ring of Fire, 2004
