= 1632 (novel) =

2000 novel by Eric Flint

- First edition
- Author: Eric Flint
- Cover artist: Larry Elmore
- Language: English
- Series: 1632 series
- Genre: Alternate history, novel
- Publisher: Baen Books
- Publication date: February 1, 2000
- Publication place: United States
- Media type: Print (hardback & paperback) & ebook
- Pages: 512 pp (first edition, hardback)
- ISBN: 0-671-57849-9 (first edition, hardback)
- OCLC: 42786188
- Dewey Decimal: 813/.54 21
- LC Class: PS3556.L548 A616 2000
- Followed by: 1633

1632, published in 2000, is an alternate history novel by American author Eric Flint, the initial novel in the best-selling series of the same name.

The flagship novel kicked off a collaborative writing effort that has involved hundreds of contributors and dozens of authors. The premise involves a small American town of three thousand, sent back to May 1631, in the Holy Roman Empire during the Thirty Years' War.

== Plot summary ==
In the fictional town of Grantville, West Virginia (modeled on the real West Virginia town of Mannington), Mike Stearns, former boxer and president of the local chapter of the United Mine Workers of America (UMWA), attends the wedding of Mike's sister when a large "ring of fire" transports a hemispherical section of land about three miles in radius measured from the town center from April 2000 to May 1631, from North America to the central Holy Roman Empire. The town is thrust into the middle of the Thirty Years' War, in the German province of Thuringia in the Thuringian Forest, near the fictional German village of Badenburg. Once the Ring of Fire dissipates, Mike Stearns and several UMWA members arm themselves and travel to the outskirts of town to investigate, where they rescue a farmer's family from being raped and killed by mercenaries. Shortly afterward, they rescue Jewish nobleman Balthazar Abrabanel and his daughter, Rebecca, from marauding soldiers who are part of Count Tilly's army.

Having to confront the surrounding raging war, language barriers, and numerous social and political issues, the people of Grantville elect Mike their temporary leader and elect a provisional council, including Rebecca, to create policies to promote farming, increase energy output, and restart the mining of natural resources in the town in preparation for winter. A battalion of Scottish mercenaries sent by Sweden to find the Abrabanels discover Grantville and quickly align themselves with the Americans, hoping to defend the village of Badenburg from an approaching division of Tilly's soldiers. The Americans and Scots devastate the Catholic soldiers with their modern weaponry and take the survivors prisoner, bringing them and other German refugees into Grantville to act as farmers and manual labor, exposing them to modern culture and democracy in the process, which they celebrate with the marriage of Jeff Higgins, a young American soldier, to Gretchen, a villager rescued from Brandenburg.

Three months later, as Grantville prepares for winter with their new Scot and German allies, King Gustavus Adolphus leads the Swedish army to victory over Tilly's forces in the Battle of Breitenfeld outside of Leipzig, rapidly moving the war theater to Franconia and Bavaria, just south of Grantville. Mike leads the new U.S army to the nearby village of Jena, where they quickly defeat a legion of soldiers who broke off from Tilly's retreat and enticed the city into joining the new United States of Europe. Mike and the council draft a new constitution and hold elections in Grantville, where Mike and the other council members are elected to their current roles. Rebecca, now Mike's wife, is elected Grantville's senator and chief diplomat. Winter passes by quickly for Grantville, as trade with nearby towns and increased food production prevent any starvation, and the immigration of German merchants and Rebecca's wealthy relatives to the town increased Thuringia's population and wealth substantially.

By April 1632, the United States has grown to incorporate several neighboring cities as new states, catching the attention of King Gustavus. Rebecca leads a delegation to meet with Gustavus at the Lech river, who, upon realizing the U.S.'s wealth and power, happily accepts an alliance and trade deal with the new nation. Using micrometers provided by the Americans for improving his artillery, Gustavus is able to defeat Tilly's army on the other side of the Lech, killing him and routing his army.

Meanwhile, Cardinal Richelieu of France, upon hearing of the U.S.E., becomes greatly disturbed at the prospect of a Swedish power base in central Europe. To fight this, Richelieu works with Albrecht von Wallenstein, head of the Holy Roman Empire's imperial army, to destroy Grantville, removing Sweden's main financial and logistical base in the continent. Wallenstein sends a mediocre imperial division and directs a Spanish brigade to the towns of Suhl and Eisenach to distract the American army so a Croat mercenary force can enter Grantville to massacre the population. Mike leads the U.S army in a siege against the Spanish army, while Rebecca and Jeff narrowly survive a Croat scout force, allowing them to warn the town. The heavily armed townspeople massacre a Croat force sent into the town and several Americans are killed when the main Croat force storms the barricaded high school, though they are saved by the townspeople and a Swedish brigade led by Gustavus under the guise of the soldier "Captain Gars".

Mike and Rebecca sit down with Gustavus and decide to unite Sweden's German territories into the Confederated Principalities of Europe (CPoE) under the Swedish throne, though the U.S.E at its center is allowed to maintain its autonomy. A month later, after a joint U.S.-Swedish force storm Burgstall and successfully kill Wallenstein, the CPoE is formed as Rebecca gives birth to her and Mike's daughter.

== Reception ==
F&SF reviewer Charles de Lint received the novel favorably, describing it as "a fine, thoroughly engaging story about real people in an extraordinary situation."

Kirkus Reviews called the book a "[s]inewy shoot-'em-up, with pikes and muzzle-loaders squared off against modern automatics and 20th-century tactics: a rollicking, good-natured, fact-based flight of fancy that should appeal to alternate-history buffs as well as military-fantasy fans."

A reviewer for TechRepublic called the book "relentlessly positive, celebrating honest, hardworking folk of two eras who come together to make a better world" and should "appeal to fans of many subgenres". The reviewer also wrote that "Flint succeeds at making the whole adventure palatable by populating his tale with thoughtful, likeable, fallible characters with well drawn motivations."

RT Book Reviews called the novel "an outstanding, positive reading experience for those who appreciate living history, indomitable courage and the unsung gallantry of the everyday man."

Library Journal praised the author, saying he "convincingly re-creates the military and political tenor of the times in this imaginative and unabashedly positive approach to alternative history."

A reviewer for SFRevu wrote "1632 is a fun read and marks Flint as an author to watch for".

In contrast to the other reviews, the reviewer for The New York Review of Science Fiction criticized the book for being "almost pure mind candy" by appearing to be a comedy at times and later appearing to be very serious work by "seriously explore anachronism shock by injecting highly dramatic, life-altering decisions filled with much introspection" at other times.

1632 was listed on the Locus Hardcovers Bestsellers List for two months in a row during 2000, topping at number 4, and also later on the Paperbacks Bestsellers List for a single month in 2001 at number 3.

As of February 2020, twenty years after it was first released, the book has remained in print while still generating small annual royalty payments to the author for print copies sold, even though free electronic copies had also been available directly from the publisher for most of that time.

The book was translated to Polish in 2006. It was reviewed for Nowa Fantastyka (2007/03, p. 66) by Joanna Kułakowska, who wrote that is a relaxing pleasure read with a number of flaws. As its strength, she listed fast-paced action, humor, and light style. She criticized it, however, for propaganda-like glorification and idealization of the United States in general, and of its small town working class community in particular (the latter she called "astounding" in its optimism). She also noted a "typical American error", referring to the author's lack of understanding of feudal society and its impact on human behavior, for example understating the strength of superstition and Church influence, which resulted in the 17th-century characters of the novel being portrayed as having effectively modern mentality and values, and thus the expected culture shock and difficulty of communications between the visitors from the future and the locals have been unrealistically downplayed.

== Legacy ==
The book generated an unusual amount of fan involvement. When first contemplating a sequel, Flint decided to throw open the universe—perhaps instigated by reception of fan-fiction on the 1632 Tech Manual section of Baen's online reader forums—and invited other authors to help shape the series milieu and fictional canon and began putting together the anthology Ring of Fire.

The market for anthologies in fiction is but a small percentage of the market for novels, and the alternate history genre is a smallish niche to begin with—leading publisher Jim Baen to "hold up" the Ring of Fire collection to see if the series would get a boost from New York Times best selling author David Weber, who had just contracted to do five novels with Flint. Flint had to set aside several planned projects (the Assiti Shards novels were in outline form at the time) and do some additional co-writing with Weber as Ring of Fire gestated.

== Release details ==
- 2000, USA, Baen Books (ISBN 0-671-57849-9), February 2000, hardcover (first edition)
- 2001, USA, Baen Books (ISBN 0-671-31972-8), February 2001, paperback
- 2001, ?, Rebound by Sagebrush (ISBN 0-613-36671-9), October 2001, hardback (library binding)
- 2006, USA, Baen Books (ISBN 1-4165-3281-1), 30 June 2006, paperback
- 2014, USA, Baen Books (ISBN 978-1-4767-3641-9), February 2014, hardcover (leatherbound edition)
- 2012, USA, Baen Books (ISBN 978-1-62579-070-5), February 2013, electronic (second edition), includes major rewrite of prologue to include more information about the world that the disappearance of both Grantville and Alexander Correctional (from Time Spike) had left behind, a new afterword that explained the changes since the first edition, plus very minor changes in the novel itself to correct minor discrepancies that were uncovered when the stand-alone novel evolved into a larger series.

== See also ==
- 1632 series
