= 1633 (novel) =

2002 novel by David Weber and Eric Flint

- First edition cover
- Author: David Weber & Eric Flint
- Cover artist: Dru Blair
- Language: English
- Series: 1632 series
- Genre: Alternate history, novel
- Publisher: Baen Books
- Publication date: August 2002
- Publication place: United States
- Media type: Print (hardback & paperback) & ebook
- Pages: 608 pp (1st ed, HC); 673 pp (1st ed, PB)
- ISBN: 0-7434-3542-7 (1st ed, HC); ISBN 0-7434-7155-5 (1st ed, PB)
- OCLC: 49525790
- Dewey Decimal: 813/.5 21
- LC Class: PS3573.E217 A615 2002
- Preceded by: 1632
- Followed by: Ring of Fire and 1634: The Galileo Affair; In the Central European thread (direct sequel): 1634: The Baltic War

1633 is an alternate history novel co-written by American authors Eric Flint and David Weber published in 2002, and sequel to 1632 in the 1632 series. 1633 is the second major novel in the series and together with the anthology Ring of Fire, the two sequels begin the series hallmarks of being a shared universe with collaborative writing being very common, as well as one that, far more unusually, mixes many canonical anthologies with its works of novel length. That is because Flint wrote 1632 as a stand-alone novel, though with enough "story hooks" for an eventual sequel, and because Flint feels "history is messy" and the books reflect that real life is not a smooth, polished linear narrative flow from the pen of some historian but is instead clumps of semi-related or unrelated happenings that somehow sum up how different people act in their own self-interests.

== Premise ==
The series begins in the Modern era on May 31, 2000, during a small town wedding when the small West Virginia town of Grantville trades places in both time and geographic location with a nearly unpopulated countryside region within the Holy Roman Empire during the convulsions of the Thirty Years' War.

Flint's goal was to explore the short- and long-term effects of placing a single American town, complete with modern culture, technology and modes of thought, in certain periods of history.

The town elects the charismatic former pro-boxer Mike Stearns as president, and he quickly decides to provide refuge for those displaced as a result of the constant fighting, to branch out and grow as quickly as possible—to launch the American Revolution "150 years early", and found a "New United States". The Grantvillers undertake to defend south central Thuringia with the aid of a cavalry detachment from king Gustavus Adolphus of Sweden's Green Regiment, and fights several battles which convince various polities to join the NUS.

By early 1632, their informal alliance with Gustavus and with Jews, their manufacturing capabilities, and their defeats of Catholic armies draws serious and well-designed concerted efforts to attack the "republican cancer" growing in Thuringia, and Grantville itself is attacked, teaching Stearns that he needs a protector to "buy time", even as the "up-timers" have determined that to retain as much technology as possible they need to "gear down" to a late nineteenth-century technology base while their modern equipment is still operable.

== Plot summary ==
1633 continues where 1632 left off. Most of the novel details various political machinations of the new "United States" and the attempts of Cardinal Richelieu to nullify the threat posed by the technological advantage the up-timers have given to Gustavus Adolphus and his "Confederated Principalities of Europe". Richelieu completely changes France's foreign policy and forms an alliance aimed squarely at the NUS and Gustavus called the League of Ostend. Mike Stearns sends emissaries looking for allies, some of whom end up behind enemy lines as they already belong to the secret League of Ostend, which announces its presence in the Battle of Four Fleets. The Dutch Republic nearly falls and Stearns' emissary voluntarily stays behind, becoming trapped in the Siege of Amsterdam.

At this point, the newly created timeline start to diverge greatly from the actual history of the 17th century, in no small part because the news of a town from the future brought spies and emissaries, and a fair number of encyclopedias and history textbooks found their way into European courts. One theme of the series is of down-timer leaders trying to change, hasten or head off their histories while the acts of ordinary citizens going about their day-to-day affairs and of the leaders of Grantville effect more fundamental societal and political changes.

== A mix of methodology ==
In the 1632 series, the major novels carry the majority of internationally significant events, but the characters who perform the action are likely to have been introduced in one of the "ground-eye view" short stories which build deep background and form a backdrop for the overarching story lines. Flint is on record as stating "history is messy", but is not the stuff of the linear narrative cleaned up, categorized and written into a history book— and that he wanted to capture some sense of how individual actions on the behalf of one's own self-interest actually form the essence of history, not some idealized superman controlling the throttle and steering wheel at the heart of changing events.

To a great extent, the short stories are fundamental to the main novels in the series, introducing characters and development which play again later in the longer works. Much of the writing in Ring of Fire antedated this work, and events in this novel were correlated with the stories in that which in many cases, cover events and personalities referenced in this at the least, moreover, there is not a single story in the anthology which happens after the start of this book, they all take place ahead of its exposition.

One ROF story, "In the Navy", by Weber is a direct prequel to a main plot element in this book and its plot threads' direct sequel, 1634: The Baltic War.

== Reception ==
Publishers Weekly gave a positive review and praised the authors, Flint "for at showing how the new converts can make even the 'old Americans' uncomfortable in their zeal to achieve the blessings of 'life, liberty, and the pursuit of happiness,'" while Weber "helps smooth out characters who were stereotypes in the first book."

Booklist gave a mostly positive review, saying that "if it takes too many pages for some, others will turn every one and cry for more, which the authors intend to provide."

The reviewer for the School Library Journal wrote that the book is "cleanly written, with an enormous cast of interesting characters...with constant action and the hint of danger."

Library Journal gave a positive review, saying that the authors "take historic speculation to a new level in a tale that combines accurate historical research with bold leaps of the imagination."

1633 was listed on the Locus Hardcovers Bestsellers List for three months in a row during 2002, peaking at number 2, and later on the Paperbacks Bestsellers List for a single month in 2003 at number 1.

== Release details ==
- eBook/CDROM version, June 2002, Baen
- 2002, US, Baen Books (ISBN 0-7434-3542-7), August 2002, hardcover (first edition)
- 2003, US, Baen Books (ISBN 0-7434-7155-5), July 2003, paperback
