= S. M. Stirling bibliography =

Complete list of works by S. M. Stirling

This is the complete list of works by American science fiction author S. M. Stirling.

== Bibliography ==
=== The Lords of Creation series ===
What if Mars and Venus really were habitable and inhabited, as in many SF stories from the early sixties and before? In this alternate history series Mars and Venus were terraformed a long time ago and "seeded" with Earth life, including several different human species. On Earth everything is the same until the start of space exploration, but then the Cold War dampens down into a real, collaborative space race which overtakes the military budgets of both superpowers.

The vast investment in interplanetary exploration has changed this alternate history deeply, in ways mentioned in passing, including the close alliance of the United States, Great Britain and the Dominions; but there are other changes: in the Suez Crisis, Britain and France receive American support and succeed, and there is no Sino-Soviet split in 1959. The Soviet Union does not collapse, and there are two competing space efforts: the Sino-Soviet alliance and the US-Commonwealth alliance. The European Union is led by France, since the United Kingdom did not join it, but their space effort is considerably behind the others. The Sky People is set on Venus, while its first sequel, In the Courts of the Crimson Kings, is set on Mars. The second sequel, The Lords of Creation, is set on another world, which is reached through a "gate" which has opened on Earth.

- The Sky People (2006), ISBN 978-0-7653-1488-8
- In the Courts of the Crimson Kings (2008), ISBN 978-0-7653-1489-5
- "Swords of Zar-Tu-Kan", a short story prequel to In the Courts of the Crimson Kings, published in the 2013 anthology Old Mars (ISBN 978-0-345-53727-0), edited by George R. R. Martin and Gardner Dozois
- The Lords of Creation (2025), ISBN 978-1-6471-0099-5 (This book does not have its own Wikipedia page because it doesn't meet the standard for notability.)

=== The Change series ===
The Change is the overall name of the stories of the Nantucket series and the Emberverse series.

==== Nantucket series ====
In Island in the Sea of Time the island of Nantucket is transported by an unknown phenomenon (called "The Event" in the series) back in time into the Bronze Age circa 1250s BC (corresponding to the late Heroic Age of Greek mythology). The trilogy describes the conflict between the different factions of the island's population—some trying to dominate the world for their own benefit, others trying to better it, while most just want to survive, work hard, and claw their way back to something approaching their pre-Event way of life.

The series consists of three books:

1. Island in the Sea of Time (1998), ISBN 978-0451456755
2. Against the Tide of Years (1999), ISBN 978-0451457431
3. On the Oceans of Eternity (2000), ISBN 978-0451457806

Additionally, the short story "Riding Shotgun to Armageddon" (1998) and the novelette "Blood Wolf" (2004) are also set in this series.

==== The Emberverse series ====
Dies the Fire (2004) shows the effects on the planet—a world Nantucket left—of something called "The Change". Electricity, guns, explosives, internal combustion engines, and steam power no longer work. The series mostly deals with the Willamette Valley area of Oregon, with some description of the United Kingdom. After describing how people in those places survive the loss of 600 years of technological progress, the primary focus of this series turns to a conflict between a Portland-based neo-feudal dictatorship created by a sociopathic history professor, and the free communities of the Willamette Valley, most notably the Wiccan Clan Mackenzie and a group led by a former Marine, the Bearkillers.

- Dies the Fire (2004)
- The Protector's War (2005)
- A Meeting at Corvallis (2006)

A second series, set 22 years after the Change, and now concluded, focuses primarily on the conflict between the Willamette communities, now united, and the evil Church Universal and Triumphant (the CUT):

- The Sunrise Lands (2007)
- The Scourge of God (2008)
- The Sword of the Lady (2009)
- The High King of Montival (2010)
- The Tears of the Sun (2011)
- Lord of Mountains (2012)
- The Given Sacrifice (2013)

The conclusion of The Sword of the Lady offers a sort of explanation for the Change, which includes what appear to be Swindapa and Marian Alston, major characters from the Nantucket trilogy.

A third series, set a generation later, chronicles the adventures of Órlaith Mackenzie, the daughter of the High King, and an attack from a reborn Empire of Korea in the Californian colonies of Montival. The series was intended as a trilogy, but expanded into five books that chronicle Orlaith's adventures to find the Grass Cutting Sword before the forces of Montival go overseas to battle the evil of the Empire of Korea.

- The Golden Princess (2014)
- The Desert and the Blade (2015)
- Prince of Outcasts (2016)
- The Sea Peoples (2017)
- The Sky-Blue Wolves (2018)

Further, the short stories "A Murder in Eddsford" (2008) and "Something for Yew" (2007) are also set in this universe, taking place in post-change Britain. The short story "Ancient Ways" (2010) takes place in Central Asia 57 years after the Change.

Additionally in 2015 an anthology series called The Change was released containing stories by numerous authors set in the world of the Emberverse.

=== Shadowspawn series ===
The urban fantasy series features "Shadowspawn", an ancient subspecies of Homo sapiens (Homo sapiens nocturnis) who formed the basis of legends about vampires and werewolves and have been secretly controlling the world for most of human history.

1. A Taint in the Blood (Roc, 2010; ISBN 978-0-451-46341-8)
2. The Council of Shadows (Roc, 2011; ISBN 978-0-451-46393-7)
3. Shadows of Falling Night (Roc, 2013; ISBN 978-0-451-46451-4)

=== Fifth Millennium series ===
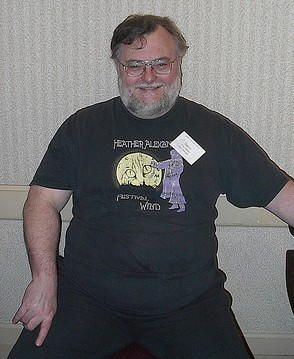
Stirling at GAFilk, January 2007. Photo by Brenda Sutton.

These are a collection of post-apocalyptic fantasy novels, in which civilization was destroyed (probably by a nuclear war) in something near our present time and new civilizations have grown to take their place. The novels are set in about the year AD 5000. There are elements of magic or psionics present, but they are fairly low-powered, while technology is approximately at the level of the historical Middle Ages. Two additional novels in this series (Lion's Heart and Lion's Soul, both by Karen Wehrstein) overlap these novels but were not authored or co-authored by Stirling. Shadow's Daughter by Shirley Meier is also part of the series. Additionally, Snowbrother is Stirling's first published novel. Saber and Shadow is a revised edition of The Sharpest Edge with a few new pages of story at the beginning and tweaks to the rest of the story to assure continuity with that new beginning. The end of the story remains the same. It also adds an appendix with explanation of the cultures and languages in the 5th Millennium, and a description of how the authors got together to write this series.

- Snowbrother (1985, ISBN 0-671-72119-4)
- The Sharpest Edge (1986, ISBN 0-451-14171-7) (with Shirley Meier) (Later re-written and expanded as Saber and Shadow)
- The Cage (1989, ISBN 0-671-72047-3) (with Shirley Meier)
- Shadow's Son (1991, ISBN 0-671-72091-0) (with Shirley Meier and Karen Wehrstein)
- Saber and Shadow (1992, ISBN 0-671-72143-7) (with Shirley Meier)
  - Shadow's Daughter; related novel (by Shirley Meier, 1991, ISBN 0-671-72096-1)
  - Lion's Heart; related novel (by Karen Wehrstein, 1991, ISBN 0-671-72044-9)
  - Lion's Soul; related novel (by Karen Wehrstein, 1991, ISBN 0-671-72071-6)

=== Draka series ===
The Draka novels postulate a dystopian slave-holding militaristic African empire founded by British Loyalists who escaped to South Africa after the American Revolution rather than to Canada (as in our history). They were later joined by French Royalist émigrés, Icelandic refugees, and demobbed veterans of the Napoleonic Wars, then by tens of thousands of defeated Confederates after the American Civil War. Stirling provides a timeline for its historical development through the 19th and 20th centuries, first as the Crown Colony of Drakia (for Francis Drake), gradually breaking away from British control to become the Dominion, then the Domination, of the Draka. The Draka culture is remarkable for combining a strictly race- and class-based hierarchical society with nearly complete gender equality (including female soldiers in integrated military units in combat roles). The Draka are greatly outnumbered by their slaves, and quite ruthless in maintaining their rule. Compared to current western society, nudity and sexuality are much less taboo among Draka.

As a result of the intense manpower pressures stemming from their conquest of Africa through the 19th century, all Draka are liable for service in the military/security forces, But there are never enough Draka (only 30 million or so at the start of World War II) to go around, and the bulk of the Domination's Armed Forces are made up of "Janissary" Legions recruited from the Serf population. The Citizen Force provides the élite cutting edge, while the "Janissaries" are the cannon fodder.

1. Marching Through Georgia (1988, ISBN 0-671-72069-4)
2. Under the Yoke (1989, ISBN 0-671-69843-5)
3. The Stone Dogs (1990, ISBN 0-671-72009-0)

- Drakon (1995, ISBN 0-671-87711-9; a Draka from the future in a world much like ours)
- The Domination (2000, ISBN 0-671-57794-8; omnibus edition of first three works)
- Drakas! (2000, ISBN 0-671-31946-9; anthology edited by Stirling)

Stirling frequently uses the Draka and other villains as point-of-view characters, leading to complaints that he has some sympathy with them. He is known to be dismayed by this analysis of his work. He describes the Draka series as dystopias based on "suppos[ing that] everything had turned out as badly as possible, these last few centuries". Stirling responded to these accusations in his novel Conquistador, which contained the quotation (variously attributed to Larry Niven or Robert A. Heinlein) "There is a technical term for someone who confuses the opinions of a character in a book with those of the author. That term is idiot."

=== General series ===
The central theme of this series is the attempt to reunite a fragmented empire by an ancient and hidden colony-world military computer that survived the collapse of space travel and general loss of technology in society. The computer imposes a mission on a strong military leader, Raj Whitehall, to reunite the various nations of the colony in a series of military campaigns that from a technology perspective are roughly analogous to late 19th-century Earth-based warfare although the role of horses has been replaced with giant dogs. A mix of historical military and science fiction, the first five books follow the attempt to re-unify the colony world; the subsequent volumes address other worlds in future times and involve other central characters. The first five novels are currently available in omnibus editions The Warlord (two novels) and The Conqueror (three novels; both collections in 2005).

with David Drake

- The Forge (1991)
- The Hammer (1992)
- The Anvil (1993)
- The Steel (1993)
- The Sword (1995)
- The Chosen (1996)
- The Reformer (1999)

=== Falkenberg's Legion series ===
The first two volumes in this series, Falkenberg's Legion and Prince of Mercenaries, were solely the work of Jerry Pournelle. In 2002, all four Falkenberg books, including the two listed below, were published in a single volume, The Prince. The Falkenberg books are part of the larger "CoDominium" series, which also includes The Mote in God's Eye and The Gripping Hand by Pournelle and Larry Niven. Stirling's books in this series are popular with many Western soldiers for their portrayal of the mechanics of an ideologically driven insurgency.

with Jerry Pournelle

- Go Tell the Spartans (1991)
- Prince of Sparta (1993)

=== Tales from the Black Chamber series ===
An alternate history series in which Theodore Roosevelt is elected president for a second time just before the First World War breaks out.

1. Black Chamber (July 2018), ISBN 978-0399586231
2. Theater of Spies (May 2019), ISBN 978-0399586255
3. Shadows of Annihilation (March 2020), ISBN 978-0399586279
- "To the Rescue" (December 2019), short story in the anthology Phases of Mars 3: Trouble in the Wind, ISBN 978-1950420759

=== Treasures of Tartary series ===
Set five years later in 1922 after the Great War in the same alternate history as the Tales from the Black Chamber

- Daggers in Darkness (March 2021), ISBN 978-1953034595 (novel has been redistributed by Baen since 2022)
- The Warlord of the Steppes (Originally scheduled for a 2023 release, publication delayed following the death of Eric Flint in July 2022 and the immediate closure of Ring of Fire Press. As of March 2025, the book is still stuck in developmental hell with an expect publication date of "2099", if not sooner.)

=== Make the Darkness Light series ===
- To Turn the Tide (August 2024), ISBN 978-1-9821-9353-9. This is a novel about a group of mid-21st century American graduate students escaping nuclear annihilation, along with their doctoral advisor, by traveling in time to the second century Roman Empire of Marcus Aurelius with enough advance technological material to transform Roman society by delaying and possibly stopping the empire's expected third century collapse.

Most reviews are extremely positive. The reviewer for the Manhattan Book Review called the book "a gripping tale of probability meddling that is so improbable as to be heartwarming, like a children's fable for well-read adults" and gave the book a rating of five out five stars. Another reviewer wrote "To Turn the Tide is the perfect fusion of knowledge and wisdom—with the seasonings of commitment and slaughter as spice." A third reviewer called the book "a page-turner that alternate history buffs will find hard to put down". A fourth reviewer called it "a fast-paced novel filled with fascinating historical detail."

This novel received the 2024 National Fantasy Fan Federation Laureate Award for Best Novel.

This novel is a nominee for the 2025 Best Alternate History Novel at the Dragon Awards.

- "The Rivals" (August 2024). A free short story that is semi-related to the novel To Turn the Tide. A group of academics from Beijing along with a high ranking Ministry of State Security officer escape a similar 21st century nuclear holocaust fate by traveling back in time to the second century Eastern Han period in China with the help of another time machine. After the release of the second novel of the series, a reader would discover that this short story is actually chapter two of the second novel in the series.
- The Winds of Fate (July 2025), ISBN 978-1-668072721. Four years has elapsed from the end of To Turn the Tide and Rome has stretched its limits to the banks of the Vistula with the Americans introducing new ideas and inventions to make life easier for the common people. The Americans later discover that they are not the only refugees from the destruction of the 21st century who were fortunate enough to escape that holocaust to the second century.
- The planned third book: The Hammer of Destiny, is expected in late 2026, with plans for a third trilogy.

=== Other novels ===
==== Belonging to series by other authors ====
- The Children's Hour (1991; with Jerry Pournelle; part of the Man-Kzin Wars series)
- Blood Feuds (1993; with Judith Tarr and Susan Shwartz and Harry Turtledove; part of the War World subseries in the CoDominium series, originally created by Jerry Pournelle)
- The City Who Fought (1993; with Anne McCaffrey; part of The Ship Who Sang series)
- Blood Vengeance (1994; with Susan Shwartz, Judith Tarr, Harry Turtledove and Jerry Pournelle; also part of the "War World" subseries)
- The Ship Avenged (1997; part of The Ship Who Sang series)
- "A Whiff of Grapeshot" (1998; short story in the anthology More Than Honor, set in the Honorverse)
- Jimmy the Hand (2003; with Raymond E. Feist; part of the Riftwar series)

==== The Flight Engineer series with James Doohan ====
1. The Rising (1996)
2. The Privateer (1999)
3. The Independent Command (2000)

==== Terminator 2 series ====
1. T2: Infiltrator (2001)
2. T2: Rising Storm (2002)
3. T2: The Future War (2003)

==== Not part of any series ====
- The Rose Sea (1994) with Holly Lisle, ISBN 9780671876203
- The Peshawar Lancers (2001), ISBN 978-0451458735
  - Shikari in Galveston (2003; prequel novella in the anthology Worlds That Weren't, ISBN 0451528980)
- Conquistador (2003), ISBN 978-0451459336

==== Anthology ====
- Ice, Iron and Gold (2007), ISBN 978-1597801157 (short-story collection; includes one Emberverse tale, one Nantucket tale, three Bolo tales, and other stories)

=== Short stories ===
- "The Charge of Lee's Brigade" (1998; collected in Harry Turtledove's anthology Alternate Generals, ISBN 978-0671878863)
- "Compadres" (2002; collected in Harry Turtledove's anthology Alternate Generals II, ISBN 978-0743471862)

==== Eric Flint's 1632 series ====
- "On the Jerichow Road" with Virginia DeMarce (September 2023; in 1632 & Beyond, Issue #1, ISBN 978-1962398008)
