= March of Cambreadth =

"March of Cambreadth" is the signature song of American singer, musician and songwriter Alexander James Adams, previously known as Heather Alexander. The song is well known in filk, Renaissance fair and Society for Creative Anachronism circles. It has been featured in novels by Mike Shepherd, John Ringo and S.M. Stirling. It has also been parodied extensively.

"March of Cambreadth" received a Pegasus Award in 2006, in the category "Best Battle Song".

== Recording history ==
Alexander James Adams wrote the song in the late 1980s and sang lead vocals on the following recordings:

- The 1990 Phoenyx album Keepers of the Flame. The band disbanded in 1991.
- The 1997 Heather Alexander solo album Midsummer, where it is framed as the center of the "War Trilogy". The Midsummer recording is at a faster tempo than on Keepers of the Flame and the Wicked Tinkers add their bagpipe-and-drums sound to the song.
- Uffington Horse's Enchantment includes a live recording of "March of Cambreadth" with Andrew Hare playing banjo, Dan Ochipinti playing drums, and Heather Alexander switching between guitar and fiddle. (This recording is included in a computer-readable data track on the Mixed Mode CD.)

Alexander James Adams has sung lead vocals on the following recordings:

- Alexander James Adams and Tricky Pixie included the song on their 2007 album Live!. Live! is currently out of print.
- The 2010 Alexander James Adams studio album Harvest Season: Second Cutting.
- The Alexander James Adams live Yule DVD, recorded in December 2009.

The song also appears on albums by other artists.

== War Trilogy ==
The "War Trilogy" on Midsummer consists of three songs. The first, a love ballad, anticipates the battle; the second portrays the battle; the third looks back on the battle and its results.

- "Tomorrow I Leave For Battle," lyrics: Philip R. Obermarck, music: Heather Alexander
- "March of Cambreadth," lyrics & music: Heather Alexander
- "Courage Knows No Bounds," lyrics: Philip R. Obermarck, music: Heather Alexander

== "Hap'n'Frog of Cambreadth" and other parodies ==
As described on the live album Festival Wind, Alexander was reading an Internet filk mailing list when his fans observed that they could sing "March of Cambreadth" to the tune of his children's song "Hap'n'Frog" and vice versa. Determined to embarrass himself before anyone else did it for him, he took the two songs "and let them have an afternoon together and breed." The result is "Hap'n'Frog of Cambreadth," recorded on Festival Wind.

Alexander did a second self-parody "March of Con Death" specifically for the RainFurrest 2009 Fur Suit Parade. As the theme for that year was "Zombie Attack" the lyrics included humorous puns relating to unlife and keeping the signature chorus line of "How many of them can we make die!"

Alexander also performed the parody "December of Cambreadth" on the album Roundworm. The words to the parody are by Bob Kanefsky, and deal with Santa Claus delivering toys, replacing the signature refrain "How many of them can we make die?" with "How many of them can we bring toys?"

Two other filk songs based on March have been written, both dealing with the aftermath of battle with the refrain "How many of them can we make live?". One, written by Batya Wittenberg, is titled "Healer's Cry", and the other, by John C. Bunnell, is titled "After Cambreadth".

== In popular culture ==
John Ringo has (mis)quoted "March of Cambreadth" in his novels Hell's Faire, Ghost and There Will Be Dragons as well as in the second Looking-Glass book, Vorpal Blade. A copy of the Midsummer recording was included on CD-ROM in There Will Be Dragons, Hell's Faire and in the Baen Free Library.

S.M. Stirling quoted or referenced "March of Cambreadth" in the Emberverse volumes The Protector's War, A Meeting at Corvallis, The Sunrise Lands, and the Nantucket volume On the Oceans of Eternity, in all of which he credits Alexander while having his characters refer to the song as traditional. The composer, who was then known as Heather Alexander, licensed their image for the basis of the character Juniper Mackenzie, in addition to song lyrics.

Mike Shepherd used the song in his book Kris Longknife: Defiant.

Bob Kanefsky has parodied March of Cambreadth twice:

- "Weight Loss Centers from Hell"
- "December of Cambreadth"

Heather Alexander recorded "December of Cambreadth" for the compilation album Roundworm.

P. R. Frost quoted "March of Cambreadth" in the book Moon In The Mirror: A Tess Noncoiré Adventure.

Because of his Celtic tune and his use of bagpipes, March of Cambreadth was taken by the supporters of the Gaunt's Ghosts saga and used in fanon for the battle hymn of the "Tanith First-and-Only", sung by the trooper Brin Milo to encourage and motivate his companions in the hellish battlefields of the 41st Millennium (Warhammer 40,000).
