= List of Emberverse characters =

This is a list of major and minor characters in S. M. Stirling's Emberverse series of post-apocalyptic, alternate-history novels.

== Bearkillers ==
- Mike Havel: A former US Marine and pilot, Mike is flying a plane carrying the Larsson family to their vacation home in Montana at the time of "the Change". He leads the Bearkillers (named for the black bear he kills when it attacks their camp), and takes the group from Idaho to the Willamette Valley. Mike reluctantly accepts the title of "Lord Bear" when it is given to him by Astrid. A fair man, he is dangerous to his enemies. Mike dislikes being a hero, but enjoys being in charge. He provokes Arminger into a duel to save his people, and the men kill each other.
- Kenneth Larsson: The Larsson patriarch, a wealthy industrialist and amateur engineer whose wife is killed shortly after the Change by white supremacists. Grateful to Mike for saving his children, Ken acknowledges him as their leader. His engineering expertise helps the Bearkillers develop a siege engine and farming tools. Ken loses a hand to Duke Iron Rod when the Duke attacks the Bearkillers. He has trouble adapting to the Change, thinking that Earth is doomed because there is no way to stop a meteor from hitting the planet. Ken is Eric, Signe, and Astrid's father, later marrying Pamela and siring several more children. He believes that aliens caused the Change.
- Signe Larsson: Ken's daughter and Eric and Astrid's sister, Signe was a vegetarian before the Change but now eats whatever she can to survive. She marries Mike, and is called "Lady Bear". Signe handles the Bearkillers' intelligence-gathering before she becomes regent after Mike's death. Although she is wary of Rudi, fearing that he will use his position as Mike's son to become Lord Bear (and take away the position for her son), she donates blood to save his life. Signe becomes a neopagan, drawn to the Norse pantheon of her Swedish ancestry. She is the mother of Ritva, Mary, Mike Jr., unidentified twin girls (fathered by Mike), and an unidentified child whom Eric Larsson assumes is fathered by Bjarni Eriksson.
- Eric Larsson: Signe and Astrid's brother and Ken's son, Eric thinks of Mike as an older brother but is jealous of the attention he pays to his sister. Usually commanding the Bearkiller cavalry in battle, he is headstrong and quick to anger. Eric teases Astrid for her love of The Lord of the Rings. He is married to Luanne, and has several children. By CY (Change Year) 22, Eric commands the Bearkiller military. Leading the Meeting's attempt to capture Pendleton, he loses a hand and earns the sobriquet "Ironfist" for his prothesis (and leadership).
- Will Hutton: An African-American horseman who had competed in several rodeos in and around Texas, Will and his family are captured by white supremacists after the Change. Mike frees them, and they become founding members of the Bearkillers; Will is Mike's second-in-command, and his horsemanship molds the Bearkillers' cavalry. He declines several offers by Mike to make him leader of the Bearkillers. After Mike's death, Will leads the group before Signe replaces him. In Dies the Fire, he has a son serving with the US military in Italy.
- Angelica Hutton: Will's wife and Luanne's mother, Angelica becomes the Bearkiller trail boss and head of logistics when they settle in Oregon. She sprinkles her conversation with Spanish words, which rubs off on the other Bearkillers.
- Luanne Hutton: Will and Angelica's daughter, Luanne is Astrid's friend until Astrid becomes jealous of her relationship with Eric (whom she marries). Luanne (part of the Bearkiller high command) usually accompanies Eric into battle, and they have several children.
- Pamela Arnstein: A California veterinarian and Renaissance reenactor, Pamela is stranded in Idaho after the Change. One of the Bearkillers' first recruits, her knowledge of swordsmanship makes her a useful addition. Pamela marries Ken, and commands his bodyguards when he leads the Bearkiller siege train into battle.
- Aaron Rothman: A doctor rescued by Mike from a band of cannibals after they cut off his foot for food, Aaron trains the Bearkiller medics and usually travels with the army to care for the wounded. Aaron has an unrequited crush on Mike, and all his boyfriends resemble the Bearkiller leader.
- Mike Havel Jr.: Mike and Signe's son, Mike Jr. is groomed by his mother to become the next Lord Bear. After saving Eric's life outside Pendleton, he is promoted and offered the chance to become Lord Bear. Mike Jr. declines, saying that he has more to learn from his mother and uncle. He admires his brother, Rudi McKenzie.
- Astrid Larsson: Signe and Eric's sister, and Eilir Mackenzie's blood sister.
- Will Larsson: Eric and Luanne's son, Will is promoted for his heroism on the Pendleton battlefield.

== Mackenzie clan ==
- Juniper Mackenzie: A folk singer and Wiccan priestess, Juniper flees Corvallis after the Change to her country home and forms the Mackenzie clan from members of her coven and other refugees. A sexual encounter with Mike produces her son (and second child), Rudi, named after her late boyfriend. Considered by many Wiccans a "goddess on Earth", Juniper spreads the Wiccan religion beyond the Willamette Valley. The de facto leader of the non-Portland Meeting groups, she develops a working relationship with Sandra Arminger after the duel at the Fields of Gold. Her children are Eilir and two other daughters, and she is married to Nigel Loring. Music attributed to Juniper in the books is by Alexander James Adams, acknowledged (as Heather Alexander) in The Protector's War.
- Rudi "Artos" Mackenzie: Rudi is the son of Juniper and Mike, born shortly after the Change. The clan's Tanist, several prophecies and strange events have followed him; one such prophecy leads him and his friends on a quest across North America to Nantucket to retrieve a sword. Rudi is described as a skillful fighter for his age, with uncanny accuracy. He is one of the few who can approach his horse, Epona, without being attacked. Rudi has a close relationship with Mathilda which grieves him, since their different religions and political situations make it unlikely that they will ever be together. A reviewer called Rudi noble, complex, and admirable.
- Dennis Martin: A bar owner before the Change, Dennis accompanies Juniper to her country home with him medieval weapons from his brother John. He has some skill as a blacksmith, but is a better woodworker. Dennis becomes a Wiccan, and inspires clan members to call Juniper "Lady Mackenzie" after he jokingly refers to her with that title. The first to wear the Mackenzie kilt, he instigates the neo-Celtic culture which defines the clan.
- Chuck Barstow: A SCA member and a gardener before the Change, he leads many of Juniper's coven to her cabin and saves several schoolchildren from an abandoned bus (adopting three of them). Chuck is the clan's Second Armsman (under Sam) until he is promoted to First Armsman when Sam retires. Married to Judy with several children, he dies outside Pendleton but awakens in the afterlife.
- Judy Barstow: Juniper's teenage friend, who converts with her to Wicca. She becomes a nurse midwife, and marries Chuck. Judy's medical skills with medicine make her the clan's lead healer and one of Juniper's closest advisors.
- Oak Barstow: One of Chuck and Judy's adopted children, who takes the name Oak after converting to Wicca. Chuck's second-in-command outside Pendleton, he orders the clan to retreat after Chuck's death. At a burial ceremony outside Dun Juniper, Oak swears to avenge his father's death.
- Sam Aylward: A former member of the Special Air Service, Sam is hunting in Oregon during the Change and initially thought that it was a nuclear war. Rescued by Juniper (who found him in a ravine), his skills as a bowyer make the longbow the clan's weapon of choice. Thwarting attempts at promotion in the British military, Sam is the clan's First Armsmen. His reputation with a longbow earned him the nickname "Aylward the Archer" and a reputation reaching Boise, Idaho.
- Nigel Loring: Sam's former commanding officer in the Special Air Service and a colonel in the Blues and Royals at the time of the Change, Nigel saves the British royal family and helps the remnants of the United Kingdom endure the Change. Disputes with King Charles III and his new wife force him to flee the country with his son, Alleyne, and John Hordle after his wife Maude is killed during their escape from Woburn Abbey. Picked up by a Tasmanian ship on a round-the-world expedition, he finds himself in Oregon and is offered land and title by Portland Protective Association Lord Protector Norman Arminger and flees after tricking him out of the nerve gas Arminger wants for his war against the Willamette Valley communities. Nigel settles with the Mackenzies, and falls in love with Juniper; they have two daughters. He commands the Mackenzie infantry (which does not use the longbow), wears full plate armour, and instills strict discipline in the Mackenzie warriors.
- Edain Aylward: Edain, Sam's son, joins Rudi on his quest to Nantucket. An accomplished archer, he finds it difficult to live up to his father's reputation.
- Eilir Mackenzie: Juniper's deaf daughter, and Astrid's blood-sister.
- Terry Martin: Dennis' stepson, a noted brewer.

== Portland Protective Association ==
- Norman Arminger: The megalomaniac Lord Protector of the Portland Protective Association is a history professor and member of the Society for Creative Anachronism before the Change, who builds the PPA with members of the society and Portland gang leaders. Labeled a sociopath, he can be cruel to his enemies and his own people and reintroduces slavery to North America. Married to Sandra and father of Mathilda, he is killed by Mike Havel in a duel.
- Sandra Arminger: Norman's wife, Mathilda's mother and PPA regent, Sandra is the association's voice of reason but can be at least as cruel as Norman. Protective of her daughter, she shamelessly manipulates her into marrying the right man.
- Mathilda Arminger: Norman and Sandra's daughter and PPA heiress (which she will inherit on her 26th birthday), Mathilda travels with Rudi to Nantucket. Sometimes ashamed of her father, she rationalizes his evil as necessary but does not want to repeat his mistakes. Good friends with Rudi, they become engaged in The Sword of the Lady.
- Conrad Renfrew: The Count of Odell, former commander of the PPA military and Lord Chancellor to Regent Arminger, Conrad's face is heavily scarred. A friend of Norman before the Change, he is his earliest supporter. Conrad is cagey about his past, causing some to question his identity. A CPA before the Change, he is less bloodthirsty than Norman and disagrees with him if he thinks he is wrong.
- Eddie Liu: A former gang member who moves quickly up the PPA ranks to become the baron of Gervais, Eddie has a grudge against Juniper (who killed his friend while they were looting a store in Corvallis after the Change). He is Norman's agent with warlords like Duke Iron Rod before his promotion to defend the PPA's southern border. Father of Odard Liu and husband of Lady Mary Liu, he is killed trying to retrieve a book of secret codes accidentally given to Rudi.
- Odard Liu: Eddie's son and the baron of Gervais, Odard is ambitious and spends time with Mathilda (in the hope that they will marry); he accompanies her and Rudi to Nantucket. He has a wary friendship with his rival, Rudi. Odard's mother, Lady Mary, undermines his baronial authority. He is killed in battle with Moorish corsairs shortly before Rudi's group reaches Nantucket.
- Mack: A former gang member and Eddie's bodyguard, he carries a large war hammer and dies defending Eddie.
- Tiphaine d'Ath: Sandra's former assassin, who commands the PPA military. A teenager at the time of the Change, she is sponsored by Sandra. Tiphaine has a grudge against Astrid for killing her lover, but later reluctantly forgives her. She kidnaps Rudi and becomes fond of him, risking almost-certain death to defend him against Norman's assassins. A lesbian, Tiphaine thinks that she must keep her sexual orientation secret from the conservative Catholic PPA (although most of those in power know and do not care).
- Alex: Odard's servant and bodyguard, who joins him on Rudi's quest to Nantucket. Alex is loyal to Odard's mother (who has ordered him to protect Odard at all costs), seeing her as the reason he and his family survived the Change. Odard turns Mathilda and Odard over to CUT soldiers to prevent Odard from dying in battle.
- Duke Iron Rod: A former biker who leads his gang in taking over an Idaho convent after the Change. Briefly allied with the PPA, his gang is defeated by the Bearkillers and he is hanged.
- Lady Mary Liu: Odard's mother and Eddie's widow, the baroness of Gervais. Norman and Sandra's friend before the Change and a member of the SCA, she jealously guards her noble privileges; Sandra is suspicious of her motives. Mary convinces Alex to protect Odard at any cost, and has undercover dealings with the CUT.
- Delia Mercer: A maid and closet lesbian and Wiccan, Delia is Tiphaine's de facto wife of and the de jure wife of Rigoberte. She becomes a member of Sandra's inner circle.
- Rigoberte de Stafford: A junior intelligence agent before the Change, Rigoberte becomes a member of Sandra's Sailor Moon commando squad. A closeted homosexual, his marriage to Delia provides for him and Tiphaine in the PPA's homophobic environment. One of Tiphaine's few close friends, Rigoberte is her executive officer in the Walla Walla campaign.

== Dúnedain Rangers ==
- Astrid Larsson: Ken's daughter and Eric and Signe's sister, Astrid is obsessed with J. R. R. Tolkien's The Lord of the Rings (which helped her survive after the Change) and calls the books "histories". Originally a member of the Bearkillers, she leaves to form the Rangers with Eilir. Astrid is married to Alleyne, and they have several children; she is angry when she cannot join Rudi's quest because of her responsibilities to the Rangers and her family. Named after Poul Anderson's daughter, one reviewer found her outlook on life similar to that of the author. Another reviewer wrote that Stirling made Astrid "a reader surrogate, with her love of fantasy", and "succeeds wildly in imbuing her with the kind of inspirational, bright-eyed youthful optimism that sees everyone else through the grimmest crises."
- Eilir Mackenzie: Juniper's daughter is born deaf and learns sign language to communicate. Originally a member of the Mackenzie clan, she and Astrid leave to form the Rangers. Eilir is the more rational of the two; attracted to Alleyne when they meet, she is jealous of Astrid but later marries John Hordle.
- Alleyne Loring: Nigel's son and Astrid's husband, Alleyne helps his father rebuild post-Change Britain with his knowledge of medieval warfare. Close friends with John since their time in the military, he accompanies Nigel in exile to Oregon. Alleyne joins the Rangers to be closer to Astrid, whose obsession with The Lord of the Rings concerns him.
- John Hordle: A former British soldier whom Nigel saves after the Change, John jokingly accuses Sam of tricking him into joining the Special Air Services by lying to him about military life. Eilir calls him her "excessively large boyfriend", and they have two children after their marriage.
- Ritva and Mary Havel: Mike and Signe's twin daughters, they grow up with the Bearkillers before joining the Rangers. Accomplished scouts who are usually paired in battle, they often finish each other's sentences. Ritva and Mary are close friends with their half-brother Rudi, and join him on his quest to Nantucket. Wearing an eye patch after losing an eye in battle, Mary marries Ingolf.
- Reuben Hutton (formerly Waters), adopted by the Huttons after the Change, is killed in a skirmish with Protectorate forces.
- Kevin Lewis, the Dúnedain Ranger medic, treats Rudi's injuries after the battle to recapture Mathilda Arminger.
- Crystal, a junior probationary Ranger, trains with Eilir in swordplay.

== Corvallis ==
- Luther Finney: An elderly farmer who lived near Corvallis and friend of Juniper. After being warned about what the Change really was, he saved his son and his family from the city they were living in before the food ran out. He became an important member of the Corvallis government thanks to his knowledge of farming and opposed the PPA and argued that Corvallis should support the other factions fighting them. Because of his religious upbringing he refused to swear around women, though often this proved difficult considering the situation. He died while working on his farm on a July day, fulfilling a promise he made after coming back from the Korean War to die on his farm on the hottest day he ever experienced.
- Edward Finney: Luther's son whom he saved from his city home. Edward took over his father's farm after he died and continues to wield the same influence his father did in Corvallis.
- Peter Jones: A graduate student at Oregon State University before the Change, Jones became the leader of Corvallis militia. He holds the rank of Major and can usually be seen wearing wrap-around sports goggles when he is in battle dress. He is distrustful of the PPA and argued for Corvallis to ally with the other factions fighting them. He led a "volunteer" force to help the Bearkillers in their battle against an invading PPA army after the Corvallis government refused to get involved in the war.

== Church Universal and Triumphant ==
- Sethaz: Prophet of the CUT at the time of Sunrise Lands, Sethaz enjoys violence and death. He sees himself as a "Scourge of God", sent to rid Earth of sinners. Sethaz has strange visions; he fears Rudi, and wants to kill him before he completes his quest.
- Joseph Kuttner: High Seeker of the CUT, Joseph is an agent of Sethaz who infiltrated the government of Iowa so it would send him on Ingolf's expedition to the eastern death zones. He loses an eye to a vengeful Ingolf, and is killed trying to kill Rudi.
- Major Graber: An officer in the Sword of the Prophet (the CUT elite), Graber is an orphan raised by CUT to be a soldier and is tasked by Sethaz to find and kill Rudi after the fall of Twin Falls.

== Mount Angel ==
- Abbot Dmwoski (spelled "Dmowski" in The Protector's War): A former soldier who joins the Benedictine monks of Mount Angel Abbey to get away from war. After the Change, he is promoted to abbot and turns the monks and sisters of Mount Angel into a fighting force to protect refugees and prevent Mount Angel from falling under the yoke of the PPA.
- Father Ignatius: A member of the Order of the Shield of St. Benedict, his birth name is Karl Bergfried. Father Ignatius, tasked with helping Mathilda escape the PPA so she can join Rudi on his quest, counsels her about Rudi.

== United States of America (Boise) ==
- President Thurston: A former member of the US military who is now President of the United States (Boise). Although he is not elected, he sees it as his duty to reunite the United States. Refusing to recognize other nations as legitimate, Thurston refuses to aide New Deseret against the CUT unless they agreed to join the US. He can admit a mistake, however, a trait Rudi admires. Martin and Frederick's father, Martin kills him when he plans to resign and hold elections.
- Martin Thurston: President Thurston's elder son and Frederick's brother, Martin thinks that the presidency should be hereditary. He conspires with the CUT to kill his father, and the murder leaves him mentally unstable. Assuming the presidency, Martin is apparently ready to ally with the CUT.
- Frederick Thurston: President Thurston's younger son and Martin's brother, he sees Martin kill his father and is rescued from a similar fate by Rudi. Frederick is a rallying point for opposition to Martin. A heathen, he is a follower of Odin.

== Empire of Japan ==
- Reiko: The Empress of Japan after the death of her father in his quest to recover Kusanagi-no-Tsurugi, Reiko is friendly with Rudi and Mathilda's daughter, Orlaith, and enlists her help.

== British Empire ==
- Charles IV: The fictional son of William V, the King of Great Britain and emperor of the West from 2039 until his death in 2066.
- Elizabeth III: The daughter of Charles IV, queen of Great Britain and empress of the West from 2066 to 2098.

== Other characters ==
- Ingolf Vogeler: A mercenary from Kickapoo, Wisconsin in the Free Republic of Richland, Ingolf is the son of a sheriff; after his brother assumes the position, he leaves to become a mercenary and a scavenger of the dead zones. He commands Vogeler's Villains, his own company, and is hired by the governor of Iowa to seek rare treasures in the eastern death zones with promises of land and his daughter's hand in marriage. Ingolf is instructed in a vision on Nantucket to search for Rudi in the west, but is betrayed (and his men killed) by Kuttner and the CUT. He escapes, warns Rudi, and follows him back to Nantucket; he becomes interested in Mary Havel.
- Kaur and Singh: Sikh brother and sister and mercenary scouts in Vogeler's Villains, they sacrifice themselves to give Ingolf time to flee Kuttner; he promises to avenge their deaths.
- Maude Loring: Nigel's wife, who is killed trying to flee Britain with her husband. Nigel names one of his daughters with Juniper after her.
- Virginia Kane: Daughter of a rancher killed by CUT-supported ranchers, Virginia meets Rudi and his band after fleeing from a rancher who wants to force her into marriage. She scalps the rancher after a skirmish between CUT forces and Rudi's party (who are allied with a Lakota scouting patrol led by John Red Leaf), and becomes interested in Frederick.
- Anthony Heasleroad: The mentally-unstable-appearing boss of Iowa, who assumes dictatorial powers after the death of his father (the first boss after the Change).
- Red Leaf: Sioux chieftain who shelters Rudi and company from the CUT. After the Change, he returns the Sioux to their nomadic roots and makes them a major power on the Great Plains. Red Leaf, good friends with Virginia Kane's father, adopts Rudi and the others into the tribe.
- John Brown: Rancher at Seffridge Ranch and an important member of CORA. After the Change, John allows refugees from the towns to live on his ranch to support themselves by working for him. A longtime ally of the Mackenzie clan, he leads a force of CORA horsemen to fight the PPA in the last war. Rudi stops at John's ranch on his quest, and John allows them to travel with his son as they escort horses to Deseret.
- BD: A merchant in the Pacific Northwest, BD is a Wiccan and an intelligence agent for the Meeting. Part of Astrid's conspiracy to kidnap the boss of Pendleton, she helps smuggle their weapons into the city. BD appeared in Kier Salmon and Tarl Neustaedter's 2006 Emberverse fan fiction, The Bonds of Kinship, before appearing in The Scourge of God.
- Jake sunna Jake: Leader of the Southside Freedom Fighters, young people brought out of Chicago by "old Jake" (his father) shortly after the Change. Rudi encounters them in the Wild Lands, befriending and adopting them. Jake is killed in battle on the Great Lakes.

== Contemporary non-fiction characters ==
- Elizabeth II: The queen flees to the Isle of Wight with the rest of the British royal family three days after the Change. She dies not too long afterwards in December 1998.
- Tony Blair: The Prime Minister is delayed in his escort to the Isle of Wight. Although he sends messages promising to leave shortly, contact with him and his party is lost and he is presumed dead.
- Charles III the Mad: Ascending the throne of Britain after the death of his mother Elizabeth II in December 1998, Charles leads the remnants of Britain through the early years after the Change. His knowledge of organic farming (with which he has experimented since the early 1980s) helped the survivors obtain food. Charles marries an Icelandic refugee who was blamed for manipulating him. He later becomes insane and refuses to have new elections for Parliament, ruling by royal decree (creating a rift between him and Nigel). Officially dying in 2008 of a stroke, he is reportedly killed by his wife (who wanted power for herself and her infant son).
- William V the Great, king of Great Britain and emperor of the West: Charles' son; after the Change, William serves in the military, when Nigel saves his life in a battle with pirates. He becomes king in 2008 after the death of his father and an attempted coup by his stepmother. William leads a crusade against Moorish pirates off the Canary Islands, and is crowned emperor of the West on his return. Under his leadership the British Empire is reborn, and he tries unsuccessfully to convince Nigel to return to Britain by promising him wealth, land, and title. William is king from 2008 until his death in a 2039 fox-hunting accident.
- Ted Kaczynski: Kaczynski escapes from prison and flees California shortly after the Change, arriving in Paradise Valley, Montana. He becomes the CUT's prophet (or leader), passing on his anti-technology philosophy to his followers. Although he becomes insane, he remains the CUT leader.
- Pope John Paul II : Dies in the Vatican, refusing to leave Rome after ordering the Swiss Guards to escort the other Vatican survivors out of the city.
- Pope Benedict XVI: Fleeing Rome for Umbria, Cardinal Ratzinger is elected pope and helps to reunite the Church of England with the Catholic Church.
- Vera Katz: Mayor of Portland, known as "the Cat" when it is learned that Arminger has her and Portland chief of police Charles Moose hanged outside the Portland Central Library.
- Charles Moose: Portland chief of police, called "the Moose" at his and Mayor Vera Katz' hanging.
- Kim Jong-il: Supreme Leader of North Korea Kim Jong-Il, under the influence of the powers guiding the Church Universal and Triumphant in the United States, conquers much of Asia after the Change; Japan is one of the few holdouts. He is succeeded by his son.
- King Birmo of Capricornia: Birmingham escaped Brisbane after the Change and eventually established as himself as a leader who helped rebuild Darwin before the grateful people declared him king. (In real life, the Australian author Birmingham is mentioned in the acknowledgement section in every book in the Emberverse series that was published after The Golden Princess in 2014. Stirling adopted Australian characters that Birmingham had created in his Emberverse short story Fortune and Glory and incorporated them in Prince of Outcasts.)

=== Novels ===
- S.M. Stirling (2004). Dies the Fire. New York: Roc. 496. ISBN 0-451-45979-2.
- S.M. Stirling (2005). The Protector's War. New York: Roc. 496. ISBN 0-451-46046-4.
- S.M. Stirling (2006). A Meeting at Corvallis. New York: Roc. 512. ISBN 0-451-46111-8.
- S.M. Stirling (2007). The Sunrise Lands. New York: Roc. 464. ISBN 978-0-451-46170-4.
- S.M. Stirling (2008). The Scourge of God. New York: Roc. 464. ISBN 978-0-451-46228-2.
- S.M. Stirling (2009). The Sword of the Lady. New York: Roc. 484. ISBN 978-0-451-46290-9.
- S.M. Stirling (2010). The High King of Montival. Penguin. 528. ISBN 9781101460061.
- S.M. Stirling (2011). Tears of the Sun. Penguin. 688. ISBN 9781101543856.
- S.M. Stirling (2012). Lord of Mountains. Penguin. 448. ISBN 9781101605097.
- S.M. Stirling (2013). The Given Sacrifice. New York: Roc. 315. ISBN 978-1-101-60319-2.
- S.M. Stirling (2014). The Golden Princess. Penguin. 432. ISBN 9781101603260.
- S.M. Stirling (2015). The Desert and the Blade. Penguin. 432. ISBN 9781101603383.
- S.M. Stirling (2016). Prince of Outcasts. Penguin. 432. ISBN 9781101603390.
- S.M. Stirling (2017). The Sea Peoples. Penguin. 336. ISBN 9780399583186.
- S.M. Stirling (2017). The Sky-Blue Wolves. Penguin. 368. ISBN 9780451490681.
