= Birmo =

Birmo may refer to:

== People ==
- John Birmingham (born 1965, nicknamed "Birmo"), British-Australian author
- Simon Birmingham, Australian politician with the Twitter handle @birmo

== Places ==
- Linden, Switzerland, a municipality that was formerly known as "Birmos"

== Other uses ==
- King Birmo of Capricornia, a fictional character from S.M. Stirling's Emberverse; see List of Emberverse characters

== See also ==
- Birmingham (disambiguation)
