= New Virginia =

New Virginia can mean:

- New Virginia, Iowa
- The former New Virginia Colony in Mexico.
- Original name of a settlement that eventually became the suburb of Monrovia now known as Virginia, Liberia
- A candidate name for what became the state of West Virginia
- A reference to the post-Civil War state of Virginia, as opposed to Old Virginia
- The fictional nation in Conquistador (novel) by S. M. Stirling
