= John Wilkie =

American journalist and law enforcement officer (1860–1934)

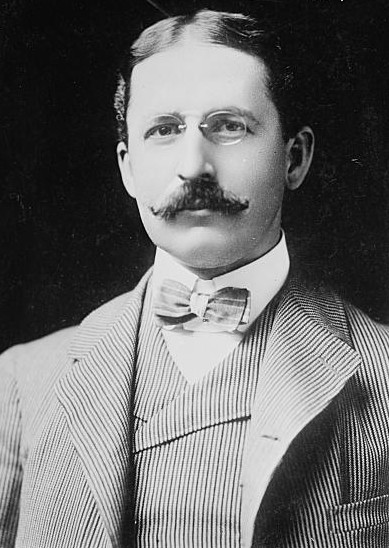
- John Wilkie, 1908

8th Chief of the United States Secret Service
- In office 1898–1911
- President: William McKinley; Theodore Roosevelt; William Howard Taft
- Preceded by: William P. Hazen
- Succeeded by: William J. Flynn

Personal details
- Born: 1860 Elgin, Illinois, U.S.
- Died: December 13, 1934 (aged 73–74)
- Parent: Frank B. Wilkie (father)

John Elbert Wilkie (1860 – December 13, 1934) was an American journalist and law enforcement officer who served as the 8th Chief of the United States Secret Service from 1898 to 1911.

== Journalist career ==
At age 19, Wilkie joined the staff of the Chicago Times as a reporter. His father, Frank B. Wilkie, was an editorial writer at the newspaper; the two traveled to Europe and served. Upon returning to the United States, Wilkie joined the staff of the Chicago Tribune, where he initially served as financial editor and later city editor. While at the Tribune, Wilkie hired satirist Finley Peter Dunne.

On August 8, 1890, while working for the Tribune, Wilkie wrote a pseudonymous article that first described the Indian Rope Trick. Featured on the front page of the paper's second section, it was soon picked up by newspapers throughout the United States and United Kingdom, and it was translated into nearly every European language. Soon a number of people claimed to remember having seen the trick as far back as the 1850s. Four months later, the Tribune printed a retraction noting the story had been "written for the purpose of presenting a theory in an entertaining form." However, the notice of the hoax garnered little attention, and the myth of the Indian Rope Trick persisted for years. When The People's Friend, a British weekly magazine, contacted the Tribune in order to contact individuals mentioned in the story, Wilkie wrote a personal note: "I am led to believe that the little story attracted more attention than I dreamed it could, and that many accepted it as perfectly true. I am sorry that anyone should have been deluded."

By 1893, Wilkie had moved to London to work on behalf of an American railroad and steamship office. He returned to the United States in 1897 to go into private business. Sometime in these years he began working with the United States Secret Service, though those who knew him personally were not aware of the fact until he became Chief of the bureau.

== Chief of the United States Secret Service ==
In early 1898, Wilke was appointed Chief of the United States Secret Service, succeeding William P. Hazen. Wilkie's task as Chief was to oversee the protection of important national officials, paramount of which was President William McKinley, foreign dignitaries visiting the United States, as well as combating the counterfeiting of currency. Hazen's tenure had ended in disarray: in 1894, the Secret Service had taken on the responsibility of protecting the President, invoking the ire of the Anti-Federalist lobby; meanwhile a major counterfeiting operation had forced the government to withdraw an entire currency issue. Hazen had been demoted and Wilkie selected to lead the office against the growing counterfeit problem.

The decision to appoint Wilkie was made by Secretary of the Treasury Lyman J. Gage, who wanted to experiment with placing a newspaper man at the head of the bureau.

Wilkie directed counter-intelligence efforts during the Spanish–American War.

President Theodore Roosevelt's active lifestyle initially put him at odds with the Secret Service; Wilkie eventually convinced the new president that the annoyance was in the interest of the country, his welfare, and the good of those assigned to protect him following the assassination of his predecessor William McKinley.

== Later career ==
Wilkie also served as assistant to the president of the Chicago Surface Lines and vice president of the Chicago Railway company.

== In fiction ==
Wilkie is featured prominently in the 2014 novel The Great Abraham Lincoln Pocket Watch Conspiracy, where he is portrayed as a loyal but combative subordinate to President William Howard Taft. (There is also a major twist in the story about his real identity.) Many elements of the U.S. Secret Service from the era, such as their weapons and commission books, are featured, as are several U.S. Secret Service agents. An online-only chapter of the book also depicts Wilkie at work in his office at the Treasury Building, which is described in detail.

He is also a character in S.M. Stirling's Tales of the Black Chamber trilogy, an alternate history of World War II in which he remains chief of the Secret Service under a third Theodore Roosevelt administration.

Government offices
Preceded by William P. Hazen	Chief, United States Secret Service; 1898–1911	Succeeded by William J. Flynn
