= Black Chamber (novel) =

2018 alternate history novel by S. M. Stirling

- Author: S. M. Stirling
- Audio read by: Todd McLaren
- Cover artist: Shutterstock
- Series: Tales from the Black Chamber
- Genre: Alternate history
- Set in: Alternate World War I
- Publisher: Ace
- Publication date: July 3, 2018
- Media type: Trade paperback; ebook; audio book
- Pages: 400
- ISBN: 9780399586231
- OCLC: 1088679484
- Dewey Decimal: 813/.54
- LC Class: PS3569.T543 B58 2018
- Followed by: Theater of Spies
- Website: smstirling.com/books/black-chamber/

Black Chamber is an alternative history novel by Canadian-American author S. M. Stirling, published in 2018. The novel is the start of a series wherein Theodore Roosevelt's bid for the U.S. presidency in 1912 was successful. The story begins on September 1, 1916 and features a "Black Chamber" that is much more than the historical U.S. government code-breaking agency.

== Plot summary ==
=== Preliminaries ===
When William Howard Taft, Theodore Roosevelt's opponent in the 1912 presidential election dies of a heart attack, Roosevelt's election is assured. After Roosevelt takes office, the United States conquers Mexico "for its own good" and begins a rigorous progress agenda.

=== Main plot ===
In September 1916, the United States has not yet declared itself a participant in World War I. President Roosevelt wants to stay out of World War I. However, the war is going very well for Germany and Roosevelt learns that the Germans have a new weapon whose characteristics are unknown.

Luz O'Malley Aróstegui is a senior field operative for the Black Chamber, a U.S. spy and security agency. Luz, who is ethnically Cuban-Irish, impersonates a Mexican-Irish revolutionary in order to contact a German agent who she learns is Baron Horst von Dückler. They become lovers and Luz learns that the weapon, called "The Breath of Loki", is a poisonous gas that kills on contact. Luz convinces Ciara Whelan, an Irish-American with a grudge against the U.S. to help her.

Eventually, Luz has to deal with a German plan to keep the United States out of the war by bringing the poisonous gas to the East Coast.

== Characters ==
=== Factual ===
- Theodore Roosevelt, President of the United States
- General Leonard Wood, chief of the US general staff
- John Wilkie, director of the Secret Service and the Black Chamber
- John Hoover, an operative with the Black Chamber
- General Paul von Hindenburg, chief of the general staff, German Army
- General Erich Ludendorff, quartermaster general (second in command), German Army
- Colonel Walter Nicolai, chief of German military intelligence

=== Fictional ===
- Luz O'Malley Aróstegui, Senior Field Operative with the Black Chamber
- Ciara Whelan, a Fenian at the beginning
- Captain Baron Horst von Dückler, assigned to German military intelligence

== Critical reception ==
- Liz Bourke called Black Chamber a "rattlingly good spy thriller" and liked the characters but disliked that none of the characters could truly be considered good and was troubled by the main plot involving the use of chemical weapons on civilians.
- Publishers Weekly in a starred review praised the "lavish historical, linguistic, and cultural detail—including sly digs at real-life figures, such as a youthful J. Edgar Hoover—enhance well-rounded characters to make this a highly enjoyable espionage romp."
