= Georgian Wicca =

Tradition in the neopagan religion of Wicca

- Abbreviation: GW
- Type: Wicca
- Classification: Traditional/Eclectic Wicca
- Governance: Priesthood
- Structure: 'Family'
- Region: Canada, United States
- Founder: George Patterson
- Origin: 1970; Bakersfield, California
- Members: Over 1,000

Georgian Wicca is a tradition, or denomination, in the neopagan religion of Wicca. In its organisation, it is very similar to British Traditional Wicca groups such as Gardnerian Wicca, however, it does not trace its initiatory line to one of the old English covens.

The name "Georgian" refers to its founder, George Patterson, who founded the tradition in 1970 in the United States.

== History ==
The Georgian Tradition was founded in 1970 by George Eliott (Pat) Patterson III, when he began teaching his first students, two women called Zanoni Silverknife (Jillaine Callison, 1946–2020) and Tanith (Linda Guinn, 1947–2015). It began as a small coven in Patterson’s home, in Bakersfield, California.

Patterson claimed to have received early teachings from members of a Celtic Coven in Boston. He told his early initiates when World War II began, he enlisted in the Armed Forces and served for four years. On his return to Boston, he found family members had destroyed his Book and ritual items. He could not find the family he'd studied with. Despite research into this history, there is no independent evidence any such coven existed. At other times, he told students and initiates that he had been initiated into either the Alexandrian or Gardnerian Tradition, and at one point also claimed to have been initiated into the Craft by his father. Investigation of the claims of initiation into either the Alexandrian or Gardnerian Traditions have demonstrated no verification in the records of either of those traditions; initiation by his father can neither be proved nor disproved.

Soon after forming the group, Patterson applied to the State of California for legal status as an incorporated church and through the Universal Life Church had a charter (1971) and Ministerial credentials for himself and Silverknife.

Patterson gathered information, lessons and lore from many helpful sources. These included Doris and Sylvester Stuart of England, Lady Gwen Thompson of the New England Covens of Traditionalist Witches (N.E.C.T.W.), and others. The Georgian Tradition is based on Gardnerian and Alexandrian Wicca practices, incorporating Etruscan lore from Leland, using those rites and rituals shared by the Sylvestrians and N.E.C.T.W. as well as material from New York Covens of Traditionalist Witches (N.Y.C.T.W); Lord Hermes (Edmund Buczynski) and Lady Siobhan (Order of the Silver Wheel) were most helpful. Many of the rituals are similar to those published in various books on what is sometimes called "British Traditional Wicca" (BTW), such as Janet and Stewart Farrar's Eight Sabbats for Witches and The Witches' Way, as well as the privately distributed version of what was later published as Ed Fitch's Grimoire of the Shadows.

Georgian Wicca is therefore similar to Alexandrian and Gardnerian Wiccan practice, in that it is an initiatory line and oath-bound. Georgian Wicca, however, is not a recognized member of the BTW, as it lacks an important requirement—initiatory lineage back to one of the BTW covens in England. Therefore, it is considered BTW-derived.

== Newsletter days ==
Beginning in 1976, Patterson edited the Georgian Newsletter, a chatty, informal correspondence that helped to build the community of Georgians and link them with one another. Following his death in 1984, the newsletter continued for a few years, and subsequently ceased publication. The newsletter contained bits of gossip, "Helpful Hints", book reviews, and the feature "Being a Witch is ... "

Following a lengthy hiatus, the Georgian Newsletter was revived as a free publication in 2007 by members of the tradition, a current archive (as of May 2013) exists at The Georgian Wicca Tradition Newsletter.

== Present day ==
Georgians are now worldwide and growing; many are in the Armed Forces, carrying the Tradition with them. Recently, there has been an upsurge in those interested in reconnecting with or learning about the Georgian Tradition.

At present, there are known Georgian Covens in British Columbia, California, Florida, Oregon, Colorado, Maryland, Michigan, Washington, Utah, and Oklahoma. There is also a current effort being made to reconnect members of the Tradition.

== Fictional depictions ==
In S. M. Stirling's Emberverse series, the Singing Moon Coven, which forms the basis of the Wiccan Clan MacKenzie, is described as: "an eclectic Georgian group who favor Celtic symbolism".

A number of aspects of Georgian Wiccan derived practice are portrayed in the series.

== See also ==
- Dorothy Morrison
