= The Sword of the Lady =

2009 novel by S. M. Stirling

- Author: S. M. Stirling
- Cover artist: Larry Rostant
- Language: English
- Series: The Emberverse series
- Genre: Alternate history, post-apocalyptic
- Publisher: Roc Books
- Publication date: August 25, 2009
- Publication place: United States
- Media type: print (hardcover)
- Pages: 484
- ISBN: 0-451-46290-4
- Preceded by: The Scourge of God
- Followed by: The High King of Montival

The Sword of the Lady (2009) is an alternate history, post-apocalyptic novel by American writer S. M. Stirling. It is the sixth book in the Emberverse series. Rudi Mackenzie and his group leave Iowa, heading through Wisconsin, out onto the Great Lakes, into what was once Maine and finally to Nantucket. All the while they are pursued by the Church Universal and Triumphant (CUT), led by a High Seeker (a CUT priest with supernatural powers) and Major Graber.

== Plot summary ==
Rudi Mackenzie and Edain Aylward Mackenzie head out through post-Change Illinois on a mission given to them by the Bossman of Iowa to recover Ingolf Vogeler's wagons that he abandoned there. They break up an ambush by Knifers and save three Southside Freedom Fighters (Southsiders), descendants of survivors from Chicago, including their leader Jake. Rudi adopts the tribe and they help him bring Ingolf's wagons back to Iowa. Along the way, Rudi and Edain teach them how to make bows and arrows, then train them as military archers. Southsiders listen to them sing and add the songs to their story-poor culture. Soon the Southsiders consider themselves part of Clan Mackenzie.

Meanwhile, Mary and Ritva Havel are trying to find a way to break Ingolf out of the Bossman's prison. Then Captain Denson of the Iowa State Police has a conversation with Ingolf and offers to release him from prison if he lures the CUT troops from Des Moines. When Ingolf agrees, Denson takes him out while his men kill the other prisoners who witnessed the conversation.

When Rudi reaches the Mississippi River, Denson meets them on the east side of the river. He brings Ingolf with him. They cross the river and meet the Bossman and the rest of Rudi's party in Dubuque.

Meanwhile, the Corvallis Meeting is fighting CUT and Boise invaders. The Prophet's troops are converging on the Meeting lands from several directions. While the Meeting nations can slow the invasion down, they have been unable to drive the invaders back. News that the Portland Protective Association are losing castles due to the strange abilities of the CUT High Seekers causes morale to drop.

Back in Iowa, the Major Graber and his CUT forces attempt to kill Rudi and his allies. Though Rudi survives, the CUT manage to assassinate the Bossman of Iowa. Thanks to Mathilda Arminger's efforts, however, she manages to encourage the Bossman's wife to take power as Regent, creating a new ally for Rudi and his group. Rudi and his group leave Iowa heading north along the Mississippi River. While en route, Rudi's companions swear loyalty to him as the High King of "Montival", the new name the group has chosen for the Pacific Northwest. Rudi reluctantly accepts.

Rudi and his group arrive in the nation of Richland, Ingolf's home. While there Ingolf makes amends with his estranged brother, a local sheriff, who agrees to help Ingolf and his friends reach Nantucket. Heading north around the Great Lakes using skis to move over the snow, the party is attacked once again by CUT forces who are allied with French-speaking savages from former Quebec. Though they succeed in driving off the CUT forces, Jake is killed in the battle.

Arriving in Maine, Rudi and his followers are taken in by survivors who have adopted a Viking-like culture. They agree to help Rudi reach Nantucket, but upon arriving at a coastal town, they discover it under siege by Major Graber and Muslim Corsairs. Rudi and his forces succeed in lifting the siege and capture one of the pirate leaders, but Odard Liu is killed during the battle.

Rudi convinces the pirate captain to take him and his followers to Nantucket. They are chased there by Major Graber who has commandeered another pirate vessel. As both ships arrive at Nantucket, reality begins to change as alternate versions of Nantucket begin to appear at random. Rudi and his followers fight their way onto Nantucket. There Rudi is transported into the presence of Maiden, Mother, and Crone who have taken the form of Rudi's mother (Juniper Mackenzie) and Marion Alston and Swindapa from the Nantucket series. They explain the reason behind the Change, alluding at humanity's importance (the Fermi paradox) and that certain forces saw the need for humanity to mature more before it self-destructed due to abuse of technology. They also explain the powers that are aiding CUT as a result of a disagreement between those forces on how best to guide the changed humanity. Rudi is last seen removing the Sword of the Lady from its sheath. Back in Montival, Juniper calls on the help of the gods against the CUT in a ceremony (Cone of power). During the ceremony visible light emanates from Juniper's hands and she proclaims the coming of the High King.

== Literary significance and reception ==
As of September 3, 2009, The Sword of the Lady has ranked 13th on the New York Times Best Seller List. This is the first time that a Stirling novel has reached the top 15 on the list.
