= A Meeting at Corvallis =

2006 novel by S. M. Stirling

- First edition
- Author: S. M. Stirling
- Cover artist: Larry Rostant
- Language: English
- Series: The Emberverse series
- Genre: Science fiction
- Publisher: Roc Books
- Publication date: September 5, 2006
- Publication place: United States
- Media type: Print (hardback & paperback)
- Pages: 512
- ISBN: 0-451-46111-8
- OCLC: 63178922
- Dewey Decimal: 813/.54 22
- LC Class: PS3569.T543 M44 2006
- Preceded by: The Protector's War
- Followed by: The Sunrise Lands

A Meeting at Corvallis is a 2006 science fiction novel by S. M. Stirling. It is third novel in the Emberverse series that began with Dies the Fire and continued with The Protector's War. The story describes the events of roughly a year, some nine to ten years after the Change that altered the Laws of physics. It describes the war between the Portland Protective Association (PPA) and the other communities of the Willamette Valley.

== Plot summary ==
Mike (Lord Bear) and Signe Havel of the Bearkillers and Juniper Mackenzie of Clan Mackenzie travel to Corvallis, a neutral city-state, to convince them to join in resisting the PPA. Meanwhile, the Dunedain Rangers have captured a major knight of the PPA leading a band of raiders into their territory and take him to Corvallis for his trial. Sandra Arminger and her servant/assassin Tiphaine also travel to Corvallis to speak in defense of the PPA. Sandra sends Tiphaine to kill the knight so he cannot be used as evidence against the PPA. Tiphaine successfully kills the knight and flees the scene even though she is ambushed by the Rangers. At the Corvallis Faculty Senate, the governing body of Corvallis originally composed of professors from Oregon State University, the allied forces are unable to convince Corvallis to side against the PPA; but they are successful in getting Corvallis to recognize the Dunedain Rangers.

Months later, Lord Protector Norman Arminger finally begins his war against the Bearkillers, Mount Angel, and Clan Mackenzie. Arminger divides his forces into three armies and dispatches them to destroy the three factions. While Corvallis refuses to help, two thousand Corvallis volunteers arrive to reinforce the Bearkillers and help them win their battle against Protectorate forces. The Central Oregon Ranchers Association also pitches in, sending a few hundred light cavalrymen to help the MacKenzies break the siege of Mount Angel. The remaining Protectorate forces regroup and retreat back to PPA territory.

Rudi Mackenzie (son of Juniper Mackenzie and Mike Havel) is captured in a PPA raid to free Princess Mathilda Arminger, and Sandra entrusts him to Tiphaine. Tiphaine takes the two children to her castle, where she holds them. Norman Arminger, however, decides to have Rudi captured and tortured, and sends one of his knights to collect him. A Ranger rescue mission to free Rudi, led by Astrid Larsson, arrives during the skirmish between the PPA factions, but Tiphaine is already victorious. Tiphaine had sworn vengeance on Astrid for killing Tiphaine's lover, Katrina, but Rudi and Mathilda persuade Astrid to leave Tiphaine alive and the women abandon their vendetta. Astrid and the Rangers leave with Rudi, leaving Mathilda with Tiphaine.

The war breaks out again and this time the PPA has massed its entire army for one decisive battle. Ten thousand PPA lancers, spearmen, and crossbowmen take the field against the combined allied army. Lord Bear Mike Havel, feeling that the allies may lose the battle, publicly challenges Arminger to a personal duel. Arminger, with rebellions back home and knowing that looking weak in front of his nobles would destroy his nation, accepts the challenge. Havel and Arminger meet each other in single combat with lances, swords, and daggers, and after a long fight, Havel slays Arminger with a dagger thrust. Havel, however, is fatally wounded during the battle, and after giving his final orders and messages to his family and closest friends, he dies.

With both leaders dead, the PPA force begins to break up and return to home. Sandra Arminger negotiates a truce with Juniper Mackenzie and the remaining Bearkiller leaders. They decide on an annual meeting to be held at Corvallis, a peace treaty, and agree that Princess Mathilda and Rudi Mackenzie would spend a few months each year in PPA and Mackenzie territory until they reach adulthood. Soon after, Mike Havel's funeral is held in Bearkiller territory.

At the end of the book, Juniper has a vision during a Wiccan ceremony of an adult Rudi, leading a massive army, that is shouting his craft-name, "Artos."

== Literary criticism and reception ==
Kel Munger from the Sacramento News and Review gave a good review of the novel saying "Stirling really knows how to write a sword fight, for openers."
