= The Scourge of God (novel) =

2008 novel by S. M. Stirling

- Author: S. M. Stirling
- Language: English
- Series: The Emberverse series
- Genre: Science fiction
- Publisher: Roc Books
- Publication date: September 2, 2008
- Publication place: United States
- Media type: Print (hardcover)
- Pages: 464
- ISBN: 0-451-46228-9
- OCLC: 212893652
- Preceded by: The Sunrise Lands
- Followed by: The Sword of the Lady

The Scourge of God (2008) is an alternate history, post-apocalyptic novel by American writer S. M. Stirling. It is the fifth book in the Emberverse series. The novel continues the journey of Rudi Mackenzie and his companions as they travel across the former United States, a generation after "The Change" killed off technology and plunged the world into a new Dark Age, on their quest to Nantucket where rumor says The Change originated. The novel's title comes from the title Sethaz gave himself at the end of The Sunrise Lands.

== Plot summary ==
Rudi Mackenzie and company stage a rescue of Mathilda Arminger, Odard Liu, and Ingolf Vogeler from High Seeker Kuttner. They come upon a group of Mormon rebels, who join up with Rudi and reach the town of Picabo, now occupied by Church Universal and Triumphant (CUT). They attempt to infiltrate the town, but are discovered and chased out by Graber.

After recovering in the woods, the whole company is discovered by a group of Buddhist monks, and they winter in their monastery. While at the monastery, Ignatius receives a vision from Mary telling him to look after Mathilda.

As the group enters Sioux territory, they are greeted by Sioux chief Red Leaf and his soldiers. Red Leaf gives the group sanctuary, but Major Graber catches up with them. The ranchers and the CUT are driven away after the two forces accidentally upset some lions. Rudi and his group stay with Red Leaf's tribe, but leave just before Graber returns with reinforcements. With the help of Red Leaf's son, they manage to get on the other side of a huge stream of migrating buffalo, thus losing Graber.

Rudi and company make it to Iowa and, thanks to Ingolf's connections with a local influential farmer, are able to make it to Des Moines, where they hope to finance a trip into the eastern deathlands. The group is ambushed and captured by the State Police. It appears that the Bossman of Iowa is angry with Ingolf for not completing a salvaging expedition he had paid for into the eastern Death zones. Rudi volunteers to retrieve the goods that were abandoned in Illinois. The Bossman agrees on the condition that Rudi must do it alone in one month.

Back in Oregon, the leaders of the Meeting march toward Pendleton to capture the Bossman of Pendleton and his family. With the help of a spy in the service of Sandra Arminger, the Rangers sneak into the city and get access to the Bossman's palace. Astrid captures the Bossman and his family, but Sethaz incites the crowd to attack the Rangers, who are forced to flee with only the Bossman. Tiphaine rescues them, but Astrid has been injured and has to cede command of the army to Tiphaine. Tiphaine attempts a fighting retreat in an effort to buy time for the infantry to escape.

Back home, the Mackenzies and Bearkillers mourn their dead.

== Literary significance and reception ==
Generally, reviews have been good for Scourge. Harriet Klausner was quoted as saying: "Fans will remain enthralled once the shock lets up as the tale is filled with action, strong characters in conflict, vivid descriptions of a battered dying land trying to come back to life two plus decades since the Change, and a great cliffhanging climax.". Publishers Weekly said of the novel: "Stirling eloquently describes a devastated, mystical world that will appeal to fans of traditional fantasy as well as post-apocalyptic SF." The review on Monsters and Critics praised Stirling for vividly describing the political landscape of his fictional world while also declaring Rudi to be satisfyingly multifaceted. A reviewer from the Baltimore Science Fiction Society called the novel "a fun post apocalypse quest story with a twist." Kel Munger from the Sacramento News and Review said the novel was "surprisingly good." Bill Lawhorn of SFRevu said, "I liked this book...Stirling is a master of world-building. This series has gone a long way from its point of departure, but still keeps a horde of fans wanting more." The Historyguy Book Review said, "Stirling’s Scourge of God is a very good continuation of his Change books. The heroes are heroic, the villains are evil and worthy of killing, and the newly developing societies that Rudi and his fellowship encounter are interesting, spiritual in their own unique ways, and actually quite logical, given the circumstances of the Change."

The San Jose Mercury News gave a mixed review, saying the novel was a good read, but the fantasy elements detracted from the story.

The book ranked #19 on The New York Times fiction hardcover list for the week of September 19, 2008, and #139 on the combined USA Today list as of September 7, 2008.

== References to other works ==
- When Rudi introduces himself to the Bossman of Iowa, he says “Rudi Mackenzie, tanist of the clan Mackenzie" and the Bossman replies “There can be only one.” This is a reference to Highlander.
- BD originally appeared in the Emberverse fan fiction The Bonds of Kinship (2006) by Kier Salmon and Tarl Neustaedter, before appearing in The Scourge of God.
