= Dies the Fire =

2004 novel by S. M. Stirling

- Author: S. M. Stirling
- Cover artist: Jonathan Barkat
- Language: English
- Series: The Emberverse series
- Genre: Alternate history, Science fiction, post-apocalyptic
- Publisher: Roc Books
- Publication date: July 1, 2004
- Publication place: United States
- Media type: Print (hardback & paperback)
- Pages: 496
- ISBN: 0-451-45979-2
- OCLC: 54529659
- Dewey Decimal: 813/.54 22
- LC Class: PS3569.T543 D54 2004
- Followed by: The Protector's War

Dies the Fire is a 2004 alternate history and post-apocalyptic novel by Canadian-American writer S. M. Stirling. It is the first installment of the Emberverse series and is a spin-off from S. M. Stirling's Nantucket series in which the Massachusetts island of Nantucket is thrown back in time from March 17, 1998, to the Bronze Age.

In Dies the Fire, S. M. Stirling chronicles two groups during "The Change", a mysterious worldwide event suddenly alters physical laws so electricity, gunpowder, and most other forms of high-energy-density technology no longer work. As a result of this, modern civilization comes crashing down.

== Setting ==
Dies the Fire is set in post-apocalyptic Oregon and Idaho. After an unknown phenomenon disables most forms of modern technology such as electricity, high-pressure steam-power, combustion, computers, electronics, guns, cars, aircraft, and batteries. People quickly adapt, relying on swords and bows. Many people starve, while others continue robbing, raping, and pillaging as before the transition. Many resort to cannibalism. During this collapse, rural folks form isolated farming communities, while urbanites are enslaved by warlords. The book follows the Bearkiller Outfit and the Clan Mackenzie as they struggle to survive, while attempting to understand the mystery of 'what made the lights go out?' in this post-apocalyptic world.

== Plot ==
=== The Bearkillers ===
Mike Havel is a former United States Marine, a veteran of the Persian Gulf War, and bush pilot. On March 17, 1998, at 6:15 pm PST, Havel is flying over the Bitterroot Mountain Range in Idaho during a mysterious event that becomes known as "The Change". His passengers are business owners Kenneth and Mary Larsson and their three teenage children, Erik, Signe, and Astrid. After the plane's engine and electronics are disabled, Mike makes an emergency landing. Everyone survives, although Mary is injured.

The party hikes across mountains to a ranger cabin. Mike and Erik hike out onto the highway in hopes of finding help. After they get to the highway, they encounter white separatist survivalists who have Will Hutton (who is black) and his family prisoners. After a tense conversation with the survivalists, Mike and Erik attack them. During the battle, they manage draw the survivalists away, unfortunately leading them up the trail to the cabin with the rest of the Larsson family. Mike and Erik pursue them catching up to them after they re-captured Will and control the cabin. Mike and Erik attack the survivalists to free Will and the Larsson family. Prior to the fight, the survivalists murdered Mary Larson and were about to rape Astrid and Signe. All three survivalists are killed.

The Huttons, equine breeders and trainers, join Mike's band. The group elects Mike as their leader, then the group decides to travel from Idaho to 'Larsdalen', the Larsson estate in the Willamette Valley region of Oregon. Along the way, Astrid, suffering from stress from the survivalist incident, attacks a black bear with an arrow from her bow, provoking it into attacking Mike. It injures Mike, then they kill it. The event gives the group their name – the Bearkillers.

On the journey, the Bearkillers recruit other survivors based on their skills relevant to survival in the Changed world, and begin producing chainmail hauberks, swords, shields, and lances. Among the new members is the Waters family; patriarch Billy is an alcoholic who beats his family, but they are accepted due to Billy's experience in a bowmaking factory. Mike nonetheless warns Billy that if he finds him drinking or abusing his family again, he will beat Billy and expel him from the group. Mike is presented with a hauberk of his own, and a helmet adorned with the head of the bear the group slew. The Bearkillers are hired as mercenaries by a group near a Nez Perce Indian Reservation to deal with a cannibal band snatching people along the road to Lewiston. The Bearkillers eliminate the cannibals and rescue their prisoners.

Signe is attracted to Mike, although she keeps him at arm's length, haunted by memories of her near-rape at the hands of the survivalists.

After their mercenary army is larger, Mike takes two companions to scout west. In Portland, Mike meets Norman Arminger, leader of the Portland Protective Association. Arminger, a university professor of medieval history and member of the Society for Creative Anachronism (SCA), is re-instating feudalism by recruiting gang members and former SCA members, then eliminating anybody he does not need. Arminger offers the Bearkillers positions as Protectorate nobles, which Mike pretends to consider, and leaves Norman with the impressions the Bearkillers will accept when Mike returns.

After leaving Portland, Mike and his companions rescue Juniper Mackenzie and her friends from another band of cannibals. Mike and Juniper have an instant attraction and have unprotected sex that night before the two groups separate; Juniper becomes pregnant.

After Mike and his companions return to their group, Mike and Signe acknowledge their mutual attraction and consummate the relationship. Immediately after this, Mike is called to deal with Billy Waters, who has drunk a bottle of bourbon and began beating his wife, as well as his eldest son who tried to intervene. Mike keeps his promise to beat Billy in front of the entire Bearkiller company, but refrains from expelling him, giving him one more chance.

The Bearkillers are hired by Sheriff Woburn to fight "Duke Iron Rod"; Iron Rod is later revealed to be in league with Arminger to break the people of the Camas Prairie region and bring them under protectorate rule. The Bearkillers ambush one of Iron Rod's raiding parties. While they are away, out of spite for the punishment inflicted on him, Billy Waters helps a second group enter and attack the Bearkillers' camp. In the fighting, Ken Larsson loses his left hand and eye, but Mike and his men return in time to rout the attackers and capture Iron Rod. After reaching Larsdalen, the Bearkillers with the Clan Mackenzie and some ranchers raid a Protectorate castle Arminger constructed to control an important route (Highway 20) over the Cascades.

After the battle, Mike and Signe become engaged.

=== Clan Mackenzie ===
The parallel story of the formation of Clan Mackenzie begins with Juniper Mackenzie, a folk-singer and Wiccan priestess. Juniper is performing in a restaurant in Corvallis during The Change. She, along with her deaf teenage daughter Eilir, and their friend Dennis Martin, assist survivors of an airliner crash in the city. Juniper fears for her boyfriend Rudi, who was supposed to be flying out of Portland that evening, but holds out hope that his plane was delayed. Nearby looters are interrupted in their robbing of a jewellery store by a police officer, whose attempts at warning shots reveal that guns no longer work. The looters attack the officer, and Dennis and Juniper go to help; Juniper accidentally kills one with a blow to the temple. The others flee, and one of them, Eddie Liu, vows to avenge his dead friend. Liu later becomes one of Arminger's barons.

Juniper, Dennis, and Eilir gather supplies, collect Juniper's horses and wagon from a friend's farm, then head for Juniper's cabin in central Oregon. On the way, refugees attack them, and Eilir shoots a woman with her bow. The woman's companions flee, but the wounded woman and her son join the group. Separately, some of Juniper's coven members, led by Chuck Barstow have also decided to go to Juniper's cabin; they arrive after Juniper, after rescuing children on a bus. Chuck confirms to Juniper that Rudi's flight left an hour before the Change, and that he is surely dead.

Juniper's Clan farm the land. While hunting, Juniper and Dennis rescue Sam Aylward, a former British SAS soldier, superb archer and bowyer, after he was entangled in an accidental fall. Sam is unfamiliar with the extent of the Change, believing World War Three has occurred, and the effects on his electrical equipment are due to an EMP. Juniper and Dennis inform him of the true circumstances of the situation, and Sam elects to join Clan Mackenzie.

Juniper leads two others to scout around the area. They arrive in Corvallis, Oregon, and discover that Oregon State University professors have taken over the town, and are governing with some success. They also discover that some of Junipers friends have survived the Change. On the return journey, Juniper and her two comrades are ambushed by cannibals. Mike and his Bearkillers save them. That night, Juniper and Mike have unprotected sex; Juniper gets pregnant.

The Clan has a successful harvest, but nearby Sutterdown is occupied by Protectorate troopers. Juniper leads the Clan against the troopers, and drives them out of the town.

Sam Aylward leads a group of Mackenzie archers to aid the Bearkillers' raid against a Protectorate castle, then force the surrender of a second castle.

Juniper gives birth to a son named Rudi in memory of her late handfasted man. During Rudi's wiccaning, Juniper is overcome by inspiration, causing her to give Rudi the craft name of Artos, proclaiming a prophecy declaring him "the Sword of the Lady."

== Literary significance and reception ==
Author Paul Di Filippo praised the novel: "Post-apocalypse novels often veer either too heavily into romantic Robinsonades or nihilistic dead ends. But Stirling [has] the perfect balance between grit and glory." Di Filippo also complimented Stirling on his characterization, and ability to "make all his retro-tech plausible, easily visualizable, and interesting." The review on Scifidimensions called the novel "highly entertaining" and complimented Stirling on creating "novel premises, memorable characters, and hard to put down storytelling." Mel Odom gave a positive review of the novel, and the fact Mike and Juniper were imperfect heroes made them likable. He was pleased with the way Stirling worked in various themes from myths and legends into the story. Kel Munger from the Sacramento News and Review called the novel the "Best. Apocalyptic. Novel. Ever."

Some reviewers commented on the large amount of research. Thomas M. Wagner of SF Reviews.Net said Dies the Fire is "intelligent, meticulously crafted, but overlong and sometimes pokey end-of-the-world epic." He complimented Stirling on his research, and said he was the one "the government needed to send to New Orleans to single handedly feed and rescue hurricane survivors." Although details drag, it is a good read for those fans of "character-driven SF and fantasy epics." Wagner although thought the novel would be stronger if Arminger played a larger role. Raymond Camden, although he recommended the novel, thought details detracted from the story.

SF Reviews called it a brilliantly done post-disaster novel, but is more fantasy than science fiction. The review on SF Crowsnest called the opening of the book exciting as the reader follows Clan Mackenzie and the Bearkillers after the Change, although the ending dragged.

There were negative reviews on the book. Danny Sullivan called the novel "grating" and "too forced to be that enjoyable". He also thought it implausible for the main characters to be so lucky in a disaster on the scale of The Change. Dan Rahmel described the characters as unrealistic, and says the novel has too many improbabilities.

Russell Galen, a literary agent at Scovil Galen Ghosh Literary Agency, reviewed the book for Publishers Weekly stating that:

Ultimately, Stirling shows that while our technology influences the means by which we live, it is the myths we believe in that determine how we live. The novel's dual themes—myth and technology—should appeal to both fantasy and hard SF readers as well as to techno-thriller fans.

== References to other works ==
- Characters and symbols from The Lord of the Rings by J. R. R. Tolkien, are mentioned throughout the novel:
  - Astrid, obsessed with the stories, often compares events after The Change to events in the books.
  - Lord Protector Arminger adopts the Eye of Sauron as the symbol of the Portland Protective Association.
- The Bearkillers borrow from Robert Jordan's The Wheel of Time series, among other contemporary works of fiction, for their A-Lister oath.
  - Lyrics to some of Juniper Mackenzie's songs quoted in the books are Heather Alexander's; Alexander is credited in the acknowledgments of The Protector's War.
- Sutterdown and the Brannigan family are references to Brannigan's Special Ale, by Heather Alexander.
- Stirling's depiction of feudalism after The Change is similar to Poul Anderson's novella No Truce with Kings.
- There is a reference in the novel to David Brin's The Postman.
- Lines and phrases from singer-songwriter Stan Rogers are worked into the text, e.g. "You never had to tell him twice or find him work to do" from White Squall.
- "The Change" is similar to the phenomenon described in Steve Boyett's 1983 novel: Ariel: A Book of the Change, and the subtitle "A Book of the Change" is identical to Ariel's subtitle.
  - Lady Juniper's off-sider Aylward speaks of a fellow called Willie, operator of a pub called The Treadmill, speaks of Willie's friend although she is not named, she is Modesty Blaise. This is an homage to Peter O'Donnell's Modesty Blaise series of books.
- Premises of the novel are similar to the events described in René Barjavel's 1943 novel Ashes, Ashes.

== References in other works ==
While reviewing the 2008 remake of The Day the Earth Stood Still, John Birmingham made reference to Dies the Fire when lambasting the ending:

Has he not read Steve Stirling's Dies the Fire series? If you want to destroy humanity you take away our batteries. We are an energy based civilization and without it we cannot survive. Within two weeks of the last minutes of that film, Connelly and her little ragamuffin adoptive son would be dead of either starvation or murder at the hands of similarly starving gangs in Manhattan. The same process would repeat itself over and over across the entire world. And what do these stupid advanced super intelligent aliens think we'd do then? Turn all hippy and tree huggy?

== See also ==
- One Second After
