= Dorothy Morrison (writer) =

American writer (b. 1955)

Dorothy Morrison (born May 6, 1955) is an American writer and teacher in the fields of magic, Wicca and Neo-Paganism. She is a Third Degree Wiccan High Priestess of the Georgian Tradition, and founded the Coven of the Crystal Garden in 1986. She is a member of the Coven of the Raven, and studies the RavenMyst Circle Tradition. Originally from Texas, she is an expert archer, a former staff writer for several bow-hunting magazines, and winner of three State Championship titles (Arkansas, Tennessee and Illinois). She has also been an administrator for the Humane Society. She is a member of the Pagan Poets Society and a charter member of M.A.G.I.C., a magical writers and artists organization. Her work has been published in many journals and magazines, including Circle Network News, SageWoman, and Crone Chronicles. She presently lives in Northern Virginia with her husband Mark.

== Bibliography ==
- Bud, Blossom & Leaf: The Magical Herb Gardener's Handbook (2001) Llewellyn Publications ISBN 1-56718-443-X, ISBN 978-1-56718-443-3
- The Craft: A Witch's Book of Shadows (2001) Llewellyn Publications ISBN 1-56718-446-4, ISBN 978-1-56718-446-4
- The Craft Companion: A Witch's Journal (2001) Llewellyn Publications ISBN 0-7387-0093-2, ISBN 978-0-7387-0093-9
- Dancing the Goddess Incarnate: Living the Magic of Maiden, Mother & Crone with Kristin Madden (2006) Llewellyn Publications ISBN 0-7387-0636-1, ISBN 978-0-7387-0636-8
- Enchantments of the Heart: A Magical Guide to Finding the Love of Your Life (2002) Career Books ISBN 1-56414-546-8, ISBN 978-1-56414-546-8
- Everyday Magic: Spells & Rituals for Modern Living (2002) Llewellyn Publications ISBN 1-56718-469-3, ISBN 978-1-56718-469-3
- Everyday Moon Magic: Spells & Rituals for Abundant Living (2004) Llewellyn Publications ISBN 0-7387-0249-8, ISBN 978-0-7387-0249-0
- Everyday Sun Magic: Spells & Rituals for Radiant Living (2005) Llewellyn Publications ISBN 0-7387-0468-7, ISBN 978-0-7387-0468-5
- Everyday Tarot Magic: Meditation & Spells (2003) Llewellyn Publications ISBN 0-7387-0175-0, ISBN 978-0-7387-0175-2
- In Praise of the Crone (1999) Llewellyn Publications ISBN 1-56718-468-5, ISBN 978-1-56718-468-6
- Magical Needlework (2002) Llewellyn Publications ISBN 1-56718-470-7, ISBN 978-1-56718-470-9
- Yule: A Celebration of Light and Warmth (2000) Llewellyn Publications ISBN 1-56718-496-0, ISBN 978-1-56718-496-9
- Whimsical Tarot Deck/Book Set with Book (2000) U.S. Games Systems ISBN 1572813148, ISBN 978-1572813144

=== Articles and interviews ===
- The Craft: A Witch's Book of Shadows - Interview with Dorothy Morrison Wiccan/Pagan Times
- Interview with Dorothy Morrison 2007
- Radio interview with Dorothy Morrison
