= The Flight Engineer =

Trilogy of science fiction novels by S. M. Stirling and James Doohan

The Flight Engineer series
- Cover image of first novel in the series
- The Rising (1988); The Privateer (1999); The Independent Command (2000)
- Author: James Doohan and S.M. Stirling
- Country: United States
- Language: English
- Genre: Space opera
- Publisher: Baen Books
- Published: 1996–2000
- Media type: Print (hardback & paperback)
- No. of books: 3

The Flight Engineer is a trilogy of science fiction novels, which can be defined as space opera, by S. M. Stirling and James Doohan and published by Baen Books. It consists of The Rising (published in 1996), The Privateer (1999), and The Independent Command (2000).

== Plot summary ==
=== The Rising ===
The Rising begins in media res during a conflict between two groups, the Commonwealth and an extremist religious group the Mission Of Life Lived In Ecclesia (commonly referred to as "Mollies") and the Mollies' allies, an alien species known as the Fibians. The basis of the conflict is that the Mollies settled an otherwise worthless sector of the galaxy, later discovered to naturally have extremely rich sources of easily obtainable antihydrogen, an energy particle that is required for the high-technology space travel and civilization, and difficult to manufacture artificially.

Commander Peter Raeder, formerly a pilot, has been assigned as chief engineer on the new fast carrier ship CSF Invincible, a smaller carrier type the Commonwealth hopes to use to preserve their dwindling stockpile of antihydrogen for as long as possible. Shortly after launch, Raeder becomes aware that there is a Mollie sleeper agent aboard performing acts of sabotage to prevent the success of the fast carrier design.

After several missions and assorted acts of sabotage, Raeder successfully IDs the sleeper and manages to prevent the final sabotage, which would have destroyed the entire ship.

A sub-plot involving piloting of a Speed, the in-universe space superiority fighter, is that a pilot requires two flesh-and-blood hands to properly interface with the fighter for battle (Raeder had lost a hand prior to the events of The Rising, and though outfitted with a high-tech prosthetic otherwise indistinguishable from a real hand, cannot make the link, the prosthetic's sensory devices being unable to match the delicacy and precision required for interface). Toward the end of the book, Raeder's engineering staff successfully create an interface device that will work even for Raeder, on the basis that injuries such as Raeder's are becoming more common in the conflict, and losing an experienced pilot for such an injury drastically reduces the Commonwealth's pilot pool.

=== The Privateer ===
Fresh from the events of The Rising, Commander Peter Raeder is called to a board of inquiry for certain questionable actions during the first missions of the Invincible. When the board seems to be about to send Raeder to a desk job on Earth, a special ops Marine group catches Raeder's interest. In exchange for running a high-risk, high-reward undercover assignment, the Marine general will make sure that Raeder regains his position on the Invincible. With little other choice if he wishes to remain in space service, Raeder agrees.

Going undercover with other Commonwealth military personnel as a pirate group, Raeder's assignment is to uncover an antihydrogen smuggling ring and gather vital intelligence on the Mollies and their Fibian allies.

After successfully completing the assignment, Raeder is reassigned to the Invincible, though he will have to wait with the rest of the crew as during his assignment the fast carrier was heavily damaged and will require extensive repairs.

=== The Independent Command ===
In the final novel of the series, the crew of the Invincible find themselves in a distant, as yet unexplored by humans, section of the galaxy. There, they find the origin of the Fibian allies who have aided the Mollies so well in their war with the Commonwealth.

While they work to unravel the mystery of the Fibians, the Commonwealth is near to running out of antihydrogen completely.

The protagonists make a crucial discovery - the Fibians are not single united entity, but are subdivided along a sort of grouping by color, and only one color of which has actually allied itself with the Mollies. The other colors are ready be conclude an alliance with the Commonwealth.

Having successfully gained this alliance, the Invincible returns to human space just as an otherwise final battle has been fought. The Mollie fleet is completely demolished, but their Fibian allies, despite taking losses of their own, still has roughly a three-to-one advantage over the Commonwealth. However, with the majority of the Fibian groups allying themselves with the Commonwealth, the Mollies' Fibian allies are quickly overwhelmed and the Commonwealth emerges victorious.
