= The Emberverse series =

Series of post-apocalyptic novels by S. M. Stirling

- Cover image of first novel in the series
- Author: S.M. Stirling
- Country: United States
- Language: English
- Genre: Alternate history, Science fiction, post-apocalyptic, Fantasy
- Publisher: Roc Books
- Published: July 2004 – November 2018
- Media type: Print (hardback & paperback)
- No. of books: 15 novels
- Preceded by: Nantucket series
- Followed by: Tales from the Black Chamber

The Emberverse series—or Change World—is a series of post-apocalyptic alternate history novels written by S. M. Stirling.

The novels depict the events following a mysterious—yet sudden—worldwide event called "The Change" that occurs at 6:15 p.m. Pacific Standard Time, March 17, 1998. The Change alters both the course of history and all physical laws when it causes all the electricity, firearms, explosives, internal combustion engines, steam power and most forms of high-energy-density technology on Earth to permanently no longer work. Most of the action in the series takes place in the Willamette Valley of Oregon in the United States. The series primarily focuses on how the characters survive the loss of 600 years of technological progress. The first book, Dies the Fire, concerns the conflicts between a Portland-based neo-feudalist dictatorship and the free communities of the Willamette Valley, primarily the Bearkillers and the Wiccan Clan Mackenzie. The later series, The Change, focuses on the now-adult children of the original trilogy's major characters. A third sub-series, beginning with The Golden Princess, features the grandchildren of the original survivors as the central characters, and concluded with 2018's The Sky-Blue Wolves. The Emberverse is closely related to the preceding Stirling Nantucket series. Both deal with the aftermath of The Change, though its effect is radically different in the two series.

== Novels and short stories ==
=== Novels ===
Book #	Title	UK release	US/Canadian release
Dies the Fire (Emberverse I)
1	Dies the Fire	July 1, 2004	July 1, 2004
At 6:15 pm Pacific Standard Time, March 17, 1998, a sudden worldwide event known as the "Change" alters physical laws so that electricity, gunpowder, steam power, and most forms of high-energy-density technology no longer work. Two groups of people try to survive in Oregon's Willamette Valley, while a history professor starts a neo-feudal empire in the ruins of Portland.
2	The Protector's War	September 6, 2005	September 6, 2005
Eight years after the Change, the Portland Protective Association prepares for a war of conquest against the other communities of the Willamette Valley, but the arrival of a group of English refugees changes things for everyone.
3	A Meeting at Corvallis	September 5, 2006	September 5, 2006
The war between the Portland Protective Association and the other communities of the Willamette Valley begins.
The Change (Emberverse II)
4	The Sunrise Lands	September 30, 2007	September 4, 2007
Twenty-two years after the Change, Rudi Mackenzie leads a quest to Nantucket, while an expanding power threatens the Willamette Valley.
5	The Scourge of God	September 2, 2008	September 2, 2008
Rudi's quest continues while the nations of the Meeting prepare for war.
6	The Sword of the Lady	August 25, 2009	August 25, 2009
Rudi finally reaches Nantucket, seeking the Sword of the Lady.
7	The High King of Montival	September 7, 2010	September 7, 2010
Rudi, now hailed as Artos, the High King of Montival, returns with the Sword, forming a coalition against the Prophet.
8	The Tears of the Sun	September 6, 2011	September 6, 2011
Important events that occurred in the years when Rudi and the questers were away on their search for the Sword are explained, and preparations for the final battles against the Prophet and Boise are described, providing a set-up for the concluding volumes.
9	Lord of Mountains	September 4, 2012	September 4, 2012
The forces of Montival and its allies fight the penultimate battle against the Prophet and Artos experiences a life changing event with the Sword near a mountain lake.
10	The Given Sacrifice	September 3, 2013	September 3, 2013
Montival and its allies have won the final battle in the war against the CUT, but as peace settles across Montival and its borders spread toward San Francisco, a new enemy emerges from across the seas, and a hero falls.
The Change (Emberverse III)
11	The Golden Princess	September 2, 2014	September 2, 2014
A new monarch of Montival must forge her own future, and protect it from the forces of evil that reemerge a generation after CUT was eliminated.
12	The Desert and the Blade	September 2015	September 1, 2015
Continuing their quest that began in The Golden Princess, two future rulers of a world without technology risk their lives seeking a fabled blade...
13	Prince of Outcasts	September 6, 2016	September 6, 2016 (Previously announced as Prince John)
Prince John Arminger Mackenzie, younger brother of Crown Princess Órlaith, takes center stage as the children born after the Change and their children battle against powers that are not sympathetic to humans and human concerns.
14	The Sea Peoples	October 2017	October 10, 2017
Prince John falls captive to the power of the Yellow Raja while his sister, the Crown Princess Órlaith, leads a mostly Montivallian sea-borne expeditionary force across the Pacific in search of the malignant forces behind the attack of her father. (The author acknowledged Robert W. Chambers and his book The King in Yellow for inspiring this particular book.)
15	The Sky-Blue Wolves	November 6, 2018	November 6, 2018
The author announced that this novel is the final book in the series and that he has already started work on a new series.

=== Short stories ===
Most of the short stories so far are set 50 years after the Change, except for "Pronouncing Doom," which is set in 1999. Some in the Collection The Change: Tales of Downfall and Rebirth are set throughout the Emberverse series.

Story	Author	Published in	Publication date
"A Murder in Eddsford"	S.M. Stirling	Sideways in Crime	June 2008
A murder mystery set in post-Change Great Britain in late August 2049AD, 51 years after the Change, featuring the characters of Rutherston and Bramble.
"Something for Yew"	S.M. Stirling	Ice, Iron and Gold	October 2007
A mystery featuring Rutherston and Bramble set in January 2050AD, almost 52 years after the Change.
"Ancient Ways"	S.M. Stirling	Warriors	March 2010
A Don Cossack and two Kalmyks have an adventure near the Volga and the Don Rivers set 57 years after the Change.
"Pronouncing Doom"	S.M. Stirling	Dangerous Women	December 2013
A short story set in Mackenzie territory in 1999.
"Introduction: The Change as Setting and Secondary World"	S.M. Stirling	The Change: Tales of Downfall and Rebirth	June 2015
Not a story, but an essay on the world of the Change as a shared world.
"Hot Night at the Hopping Toad"	S.M. Stirling	The Change: Tales of Downfall and Rebirth	June 2015
A detective story starring Princess Órlaith Arminger Mackenzie in Year 41 After Change.
"Rate of Exchange"	A. M. Dellamonica	The Change: Tales of Downfall and Rebirth	June 2015
The PPA and Council of Troops send diplomats to the Cree Alliance. Takes place soon after book 10, The Given Sacrifice.
"Tight Spot"	Kier Salmon	The Change: Tales of Downfall and Rebirth	June 2015
A story set in the McClintock territory, southern Oregon CY 46.
"Against the Wind"	Lauren C. Teffeau	The Change: Tales of Downfall and Rebirth	June 2015
A family of ship salvagers must escape Haida pirates in Alaska, CY 0.
"The Demons of Witmer Hall"	M. T. Reiten	The Change: Tales of Downfall and Rebirth	June 2015
Two scientists, named Krik Vandermeer and Murali Rao at the University of North Dakota test the limits of the Change just after it happens.
"Bernie, Lord of the Apes"	John Jos. Miller	The Change: Tales of Downfall and Rebirth	June 2015
Zookeepers outside of Miami confront a mob in CY 2. A self-referential spoof of Edgar Rice Burroughs' Tarzan series.
"The Seeker: A Poison in the Blood"	Victor Milán	The Change: Tales of Downfall and Rebirth	June 2015
A desperado in the Chihuahuan Desert has a Hyborian adventure in CY 26.
"Grandpa's Gift"	Terry D. England	The Change: Tales of Downfall and Rebirth	June 2015
Scholars fight to save books in Louisiana, CY 46.
"Fortune and Glory"	John Birmingham	The Change: Tales of Downfall and Rebirth	June 2015
Three of Birmingham's favorite characters from the John Birmingham novel Without Warning are transported to Stirling's Emberverse. They take on a commission from the King of Darwin to salvage in Sydney. (The characters reappear in Stirling's own novel Prince of Outcasts subsequently.)
"The Venetian Dialectic"	Walter Jon Williams	The Change: Tales of Downfall and Rebirth	June 2015
A Venetian Admiral must out-smart all others in a cruel game played at Rhodes, CY 46.
"The Soul Remembers Uncouth Noises"	John Barnes	The Change: Tales of Downfall and Rebirth	June 2015
A story, told by extensive use of flashbacks, about a group of children with disabilities on the night of the Change and the adults they grow into in CY 26.
"Topanga and the Chatsworth Lancers"	Harry Turtledove	The Change: Tales of Downfall and Rebirth	June 2015
A group of California hippies fights off bigger city expansionists in CY 46. (Stirling revisits Topanga and Chatsworth in the main-sequence novel The Desert and the Blade
"The Hermit and the Jackalopes"	Jane Lindskold	The Change: Tales of Downfall and Rebirth	June 2015
A loner must put aside past hurts in order to save a family outside the ruins of Albuquerque, New Mexico.
"The New Normal"	Jody Lynn Nye	The Change: Tales of Downfall and Rebirth	June 2015
A story inspired by a mention in The Protector's War of a coven who survived in the New Forest of England.
"A Missed Connection"	Emily Mah	The Change: Tales of Downfall and Rebirth	June 2015
A recently returned LDS missionary tries to wait out the Change in order to get news of his love. CY 0.
"Deor"	Diana Paxson	The Change: Tales of Downfall and Rebirth	June 2015
Paxson brings two characters inspired by her Westria novels into Stirling's Emberverse, setting them in Mendocino County, California. (The characters Deor Wide-Faring and Thora Garwood become prominent characters in the series proper from The Desert and the Blade onward.)

== Post-Change Oregon ==
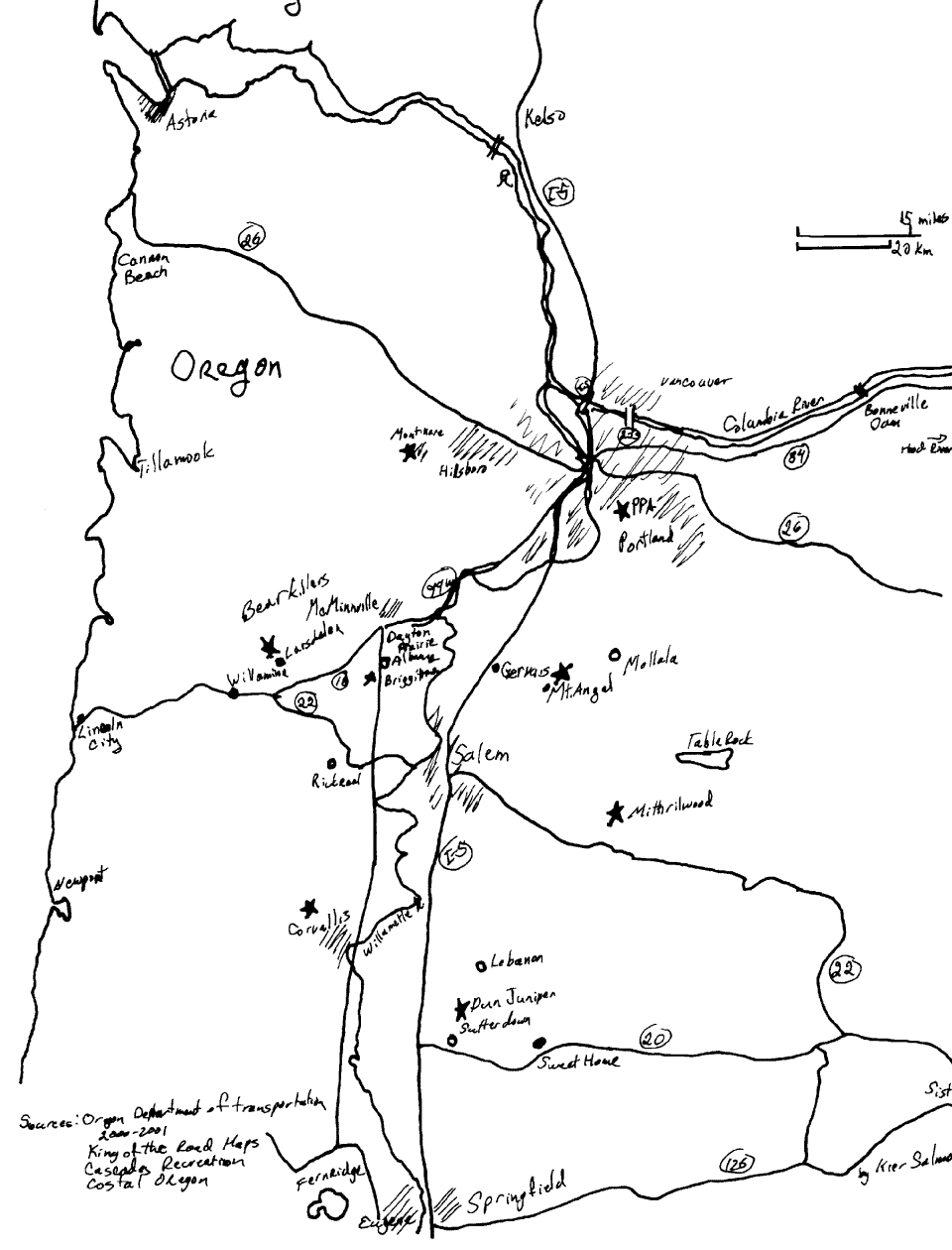
A map of Post-Change Oregon

Though the Change caused a large loss of life everywhere, Oregon suffered less than most places of similar population density. Although the region lost over 95 percent of its population, it was spared being turned into a "death zone" with no survivors except bands of cannibals—the usual fate for areas around large cities—for several reasons.

First, much of the population of Portland—the largest city in the region—was forced out by the Portland Protective Association (PPA) and either died en masse or joined the tens of thousands congregated in large refugee camps around Salem. Second, the Oregon state government prevented refugees from foraging in the rural areas without government approval. This protected the rural areas from losing their food and supplies, especially since rural citizens tended to fight off the foragers successfully. Third, large numbers of people living in refugee camps with limited medical supplies became susceptible to disease, including the bubonic plague. Thanks to strict quarantine methods, the rural communities in Oregon were spared the worst effects of the plague.

Post-Change Oregon history is then marked with the PPA's attempts to conquer the entire Willamette Valley, but the southern communities—led by the Bearkillers and Clan Mackenzie—successfully opposed them. The last attempt was called the War of the Eye, or the Protector's War, and ended with the mutual deaths of Lord Protector Arminger at the hands of Lord Bear Havel, who died shortly thereafter from his own wounds from the duel. The end of the war saw the end of the PPA's attempts at southern conquest, and the creation of "The Meeting", a United Nations–like organization dedicated to keeping the peace among the different factions in the valley. A decade later, the nations of the Meeting became embroiled in a war with the combined forces of the Church Universal and Triumphant and the United States of Boise.

=== Portland Protective Association (PPA) ===
The Portland Protective Association is a neo-feudal absolute monarchy founded by history professor and Society for Creative Anachronism (SCA) member Norman Arminger and his wife Sandra, aided by former urban gang members and members of the SCA. The nation follows medieval Norman customs and practices. The nation builds castles to protect its farming communities and serve as the centers of regional government. The PPA aristocracy often refers to its members as Associates. For a time, the PPA had an antipope, Leo XIV, and operated an Inquisition, but this ended after contact was re-established with the real pope in Badia, Italy.

Knights are the strength of the PPA military, and are trained from childhood to fight as armored horsemen, often on barded horses. Since the death of Norman Arminger at the end of the War of the Eye, Sandra rules for her daughter Mathilda as a regent. The national heraldic symbol adopted by the PPA is the Lidless Eye, an allusion to the Eye of Sauron from J. R. R. Tolkien's The Lord of the Rings.

The PPA is ruled from Portland, and stretches from Astoria to Pendleton. The Protector's Palace was once the Portland Central Library.

=== Bearkillers ===
A military organization founded by former Marine Mike Havel, the Bearkillers is composed of refugees from the Change. The group emigrated from its beginnings in Idaho to a base at Larsdalen (the former Larsson family ranch) in Oregon. Havel saved the wealthy Larsson family from death after crash-landing their light airplane in the mountains of Idaho; they later formed the nucleus of the Bearkillers.

The lands held by the Bearkillers are divided into thorps, outlying farms centering upon a fortified settlement with a smithy, mill, and other utilitarian buildings. These thorps are usually the estates of "A Listers", on which live an "A Lister" family and those families and individuals who are under their protection.

The Bearkillers military élite are the A Listers, who become part of the brotherhood of the Bearkillers after completing an apprenticeship program. Membership in the A List is open to men and women who are able to meet the rigorous physical requirements and have passed the requisite training regimen. At their graduation, new "A Listers" are sworn onto the rolls, and branded between the eyebrows with a small vertical line. The Bearkillers' military is noted for its use of pikes and horse archers, but are most feared for their skill with the backsword.

The Bearkillers are governed by a leader, titled Lord Bear, and a democratic council. The heraldic symbol of the Bearkillers is a red or crimson snarling bear's head on brown.

Bearkillers celebrate the day of the Change (March 17) as a holiday known as Gunpowder Day. Festivities include the Lord Bear setting a bowl of gunpowder on fire to test whether the laws of physics have been restored to their original condition, a feast with representatives from local nations attending, and the induction of new members into the Brotherhood of the Bearkillers.

The Bearkillers do not have a uniform religion, with some members venerating the Norse Æsir, some Wiccan, and others worshipping the Christian God in various ways.

=== Clan Mackenzie ===
Clan Mackenzie is a Georgian Wiccan clan founded by folk-singer and High Priestess Juniper Mackenzie and members of her Singing Moon coven who fled to her country home. After being rebuilt into a fortified homestead, the home was renamed Dun Juniper and became the capital of the faction. The Clan includes several other Duns that were built as the population expanded, as well as the walled city of Sutterdown, which is based on the town of Brownsville.

Clan Mackenzie's weapon of choice is the longbow, but in hand-to-hand fighting they use the gladius and buckler.

The Clan practices religious freedom, but there are few non-Wiccans in the population, mostly due to mass conversions after the Change. The heraldic symbol of the clan is a crescent moon above silver elk horns on green. The Mackenzie tartan is colored green, brown, and black, with thin orange piping. This is not the color of the historical Clan Mackenzie, whose tartan is white, red, green, and blue.

=== Mount Angel ===
After the Change, the Benedictine monks of Mount Angel Abbey aided the local town and refugees through the worst of the crisis. Similar to organizations like the Knights Templar, the monks and sisters of the Abbey now maintain martial skills to protect their nation. Mount Angel Abbey itself was rebuilt into a large fortress that is considered the strongest in the area. The head of the Abbey is also the most influential leader of Mount Angel, though the town elects a mayor to govern it in secular matters. The Mount Angel banner carries the image of Virgin and Child.

=== Corvallis ===
Corvallis is a city-state at the southern end of the Willamette Valley. The former faculty of Oregon State University governs the city as the Faculty Senate, which holds public assemblies in the Gill Coliseum. The traditions of the university have been adopted by the new nation, with the school fight song acting as the national anthem and the school mascot as their flag. It is a very wealthy state that also controls the port town of Newport. It serves as the headquarters of The Meeting.

The Corvallis military prefers jointed pikes as their weapon of choice, bolstered by catapults, ballistae, and other siege engines.

=== Dúnedain Rangers ===
Founded by Astrid Larsson (of the Bearkiller-Larsson family) and Eilir Mackenzie, the Dúnedain Rangers are a semi-mercenary military organization that protects caravans and fights brigands in the Willamette Valley. The Ranger lifestyle is based largely on The Lord of the Rings by J.R.R. Tolkien—which they refer to as "the Histories"—even to the point of requiring all members to learn the Elvish language. Rangers are also required to learn sign language as part of their training. The Rangers operate out of Mithrilwood, which is located in the old Silver Falls State Park, centered upon their settlement, Stardell Hall. The Rangers' flag features a silver tree and seven stars, similar to the royal standard of Gondor as depicted in The Lord of the Rings.

=== Central Oregon Ranchers Association (CORA) ===
The Central Oregon Ranchers Association is a confederation of independent ranchers and farmers located in Central Oregon. After the Change, the ranchers and farmers of the area took in refugees who now work in exchange for settlement land. CORA's warriors prefer to ride horseback and wield bows, sabres, and javelins. The capital is located at Bend.

=== Confederated Tribes of Warm Springs ===
The Confederated Tribes of Warm Springs are a confederation of Native American tribes, originally confined to the Warm Springs Indian Reservation, which expanded after the Change. Warm Springs accepted refugees from the Change to settle in their territory and help with farming. Many of these refugees adopted the local customs and traditions of the tribes. They remained neutral during the War of the Eye, but did allow CORA forces to pass through their territory.

=== Pendleton ===
Shortly after the Change, the town of Pendleton and the local ranchers became embroiled in a civil war against a nearby Native American reservation. For a short time the area was a duchy of the PPA, but the PPA was forced to withdraw after the end of the War of the Eye. By 2020, there was a nominal government located at Pendleton, but the local ranchers continue to exercise influence during the annual Pendleton Round-Up. The area is lawless and slavery is still practiced.

== Post-Change North America ==
Map of the Post-Change United States

After the Change, millions of North Americans were denied the technology upon which they had been dependent. The Eastern United States, most of Texas and California were some of the worst hit, as starving urbanites ate the remaining food in the area before resorting to cannibalism. Pockets of civilization, mostly around the Great Plains, survived where there were no large cities around. Several new nations sprang up to keep order in the changed world.

The new governments were organized along a feudal structure, with American terms adapting to describe medieval concepts. Memory of the United States continues to affect the culture of these nations. Many of these nations continue to fly the US flag, and several leaders take the term "President of the United States" along with their other titles.

The Sioux and Haida also carved out sizable nations in North America. The Haida returned to the practice of slavery, raiding the Oregon coast for new slaves. The Sioux live a nomadic lifestyle, taking care of their herds and hunting buffalo, though also raiding their neighbors unless they are paid protection money. The Sioux made an unsuccessful attempt to conquer Fargo and Marshall, and fought a war with the Church Universal and Triumphant that led to a peace treaty seen as somewhat unfavorable to the Sioux.

In Hawaiʻi, the population of Oʻahu wiped itself out, but civilization still exists on the Big Island of Hawaiʻi. The island produces coffee, a rare commodity in post-Change North America. Prince Edward Island also survived relatively intact, becoming a part of the British Empire, compared to most of the heavily populated sections of eastern Canada along the Saint Lawrence Seaway, such as Toronto and Montreal, which also became a Death Zone. Mexico and Central America, including the Caribbean, were almost completely depopulated by overlapping Death Zones, though by 2050, Jamaica would recover enough to have merchants trade in British ports. South America adapted to post-Change life much as North America did, with rural areas far from large cities maintaining much of their population and adapting to the new laws of nature. Chocolate was imported from the Caribbean Sea, but only after trade routes were re-established by settler populations from the south and from the British Empire. By 2050, Britain laid claim to the east coast of North America.

=== Church Universal and Triumphant ===
Located in Paradise Valley, Montana, the Church Universal and Triumphant (CUT) built a theocratic empire controlling most of Montana and Wyoming. Under the leadership of a mysterious madman, known as the Prophet, the CUT aggressively spread their religion, often resorting to conquest to do so. The Prophet has since died, leaving his son Sethaz to continue as Prophet. Soldiers of CUT are commonly called "Cutters".

=== United States of America (Boise) ===
Founded by President Thurston in Boise, the United States of America claimed all of the territory of the old United States, vowing to once again reunite the country. Although they called themselves the United States of America, they were commonly referred to by their neighbors as the "United States of Boise". The nation follows the military practices of the Roman Empire. It is nominally a democracy, though elections have not been held; President Thurston promised to hold elections after a battle with the CUT. He was purposely killed late during said battle by his eldest son, Martin Thurston, who assumed leadership of the country.

=== New Deseret ===
A Mormon theocracy, New Deseret covers northern Utah and southern Idaho. At the beginning of the Change series, the nation was in a losing war with the CUT. By the end of The Scourge of God, they were occupied by the CUT, although bands of rebels continued to offer resistance.

=== Provisional Republic of Iowa ===
Iowa managed to weather the Change, thanks to its rural economy, low population, and the fact that the Governor closed the bridges across the Mississippi River so starving refugees from the eastern states could not enter. By the Change tetralogy, the Provisional Republic of Iowa was one of the largest and wealthiest nations in North America. Farmers acted as landed gentry in Iowa society, with city evacuees serving as serfs. The position of Governor is hereditary, despite the nation's nominal status as a republic. Iowa also established a small presence in the former territories of Illinois and Nebraska. The nation aided Fargo and Marshall in their war with the Sioux.

=== Norrheim ===
Most of the New England area did not survive the Change. However a few small towns in Northern Maine did and like the Clan Mackenzie came under the influence of one person's spiritual views. Using Asatru this area became home to a group that began to think of themselves as Vikings.

== Post-Change world ==
Due to the difficulties in communicating across the world caused by the Change, information about the world outside North America is scant.

In Great Britain, the royal family and others were evacuated to the Isle of Wight on the third day after The Change to protect them from the starving rioters in London and other major cities. Elizabeth II died early during the events of the Change (in December 1998), and was succeeded by her eldest son Prince Charles as Charles III and later in his reign is known as "Mad King Charles". After Charles III died from a stroke in 2008, his elder son Prince William became the king as William V. Resettlement later began from Wight and other islands, and farmland was reestablished in England and continental Europe. Contact was made with other parts of the world, including Iceland, which removed a substantial portion of its population to Britain in order to survive. Gibraltar, Ulster, and Prince Edward Island all survived and swore loyalty to the British government; along with the new British colonies in Europe and North Africa, this led to a rebirth of the British Empire.

Other parts of Europe also survived the Change and prospered. Surviving parts of Scandinavia formed the nation of Norrland and divided Western Europe with Britain along the old German border. Parts of Ireland besides Ulster survived, including the Republic of the Shannon and, in the north, the Republic of Ireland (Provisional), called "Provoland"—a fanatical Republican entity. In Italy, three nations arose out of the Change: Venice, Sicily and the Umbrian League. Not much is known of Eastern Europe, though it has been reported it had a better survival rate than Western Europe. Comments by the author suggest that Greek survivors from Cyprus become a power in the region, repopulating the fertile Egyptian Delta and the Levantine Coasts. Russia apparently regressed into a handful of rural kingdoms, including one based around Belograd, with the Cossacks and Tatars thriving.

Pope John Paul II died in the Vatican at the time of the Change, instead of surviving until 2005, as in our timeline, but Cardinal Ratzinger fled to Umbria, where connections with the worldwide Roman Catholic church were reestablished and he was still elected Pope, as in our timeline – and his pontificate lasts until 2022 (by coincidence, the real Ratzinger/Pope Benedict XVI lived up to that date but had resigned in 2013 for health reasons). Perhaps the greatest post-Change success of the Roman Catholic Church was reunification with the Church of England, which led to the crowning of the British monarch (William V) as Emperor of the West.

For a time, Europe was threatened by raids from pirates out of the Canary Islands, supported by the Emir of Dakar. A coalition of European nations joined to retake the Canary Islands and destroy their bases on mainland Africa.

Merchants from Astoria and Newport traded at several ports in Asia, including one named New Singapore. Areas of China that survived came under attack by mounted hordes from the Mongolian steppe. India devolved to a fervently nationalistic northeastern state called Hinduraj, with smaller populations surviving south in the Deccan. Parts of South America apparently survived, given that Cardinals from there participated in the election of the new Pope. Sicily colonized Libya, while Greater Britain established colonies along the coasts of Algeria, Morocco and Mauritania. A scattering of African city-states survived along the coast of the continent including Cape Town.

Tasmania and the South Island of New Zealand did better than anywhere else in the world, with no die-off, and they were soon sending peaceful explorers to other countries. While mainland Australia did not do quite as well, its larger land mass/resources meant that after a few decades, it was able to keep up with its more fortunate neighbors, with several new political entities rising from the ashes. The most important nation in Australia was the Kingdom of Capricornia, ruling Northern Australia, with a capital in Darwin.

Shortly after the change, a single member of the Japanese Royal Family was evacuated from Tokyo by a group of soldiers referred to as the Seventy Loyal Men, though only 46 of them would survive the trip to Sado, Niigata. The member of the royal family was Reiko's grandmother, who was either Princess Mako or Princess Kako.

Supreme Leader of North Korea Kim Jong-Il, under the influence of the same Powers who guided the Church Universal and Triumphant in the United States, conquered much of mainland Eastern Asia following the Change. Following his death, he would be succeeded by his son, but it has yet to be revealed if his heir is his real-world successor, Kim Jong-un.

== Connections to the Nantucket series ==
Stirling has confirmed that the Emberverse series are linked to his Nantucket series. Evidence of this can be found throughout the novels:

- The Change occurs at the same time as the Event that propels Nantucket back in time: 6:15 p.m. PST (9:15 pm EST).
- The Mackenzie Dennis Martin's brother John, a blacksmith, is an important secondary character in the Nantucket series.
- The Larssons bought their Montana property from the family of William Walker, the principal antagonist of the Nantucket series, and Signe dated him briefly.
- A general in the Church Universal and Triumphant is named Walker, and may be related to William Walker. At the 2009 DragonCon, Stirling confirmed this relationship and said the Walkers were troublemakers in both worlds.
- Ingolf has a vision of Nantucket where he sees a picture of Swindapa.
- Two of the protagonists of the Nantucket series, Marion Alston and Swindapa, appear with Juniper Mackenzie at the end of The Sword of the Lady as aspects of the Maiden–Mother–Crone trinity during a vision sequence.

The connection between the Emberverse series and the Nantucket series has led to some confusion by readers. Science-fiction writer Paul Di Filippo appeared to miss the connection entirely:

I'm a little baffled as to why Stirling set this book in 1998. It seems to me that it requires more suspension of disbelief to pretend the world ended in the past when we know it didn't.

Paul Skevington, writing for SF Crowsnest, also missed the connection:

Curiously, Stirling has set this novel in 1998 placing us firmly within the realms of alternative history. The reason for the use of this device is not clear, as it doesn't really impact upon the progress of the narrative. Perhaps the author sought after a sense of immediacy garnered by making the events take place in our past rather than our future. Perhaps he sought to avoid the work being viewed as a prediction of things to come – an obvious trap for many speculative works.

However, Joan Field noted a basic connection:

The basic premises of the two series are a precise mirror image of one another. In one, modern Americans are transferred to a past world without modern technology and must introduce this technology in order to survive; in the other, modern Americans are suddenly deprived of the same technology and their survival depends on re-learning and re-creating older skills and technologies. (...) In both, the main conflict is between those who try to build up a fairly decent society – though by no means perfect or flawless – and those who see in the crisis a chance for seizing complete, ruthless power.

== Major themes ==
=== Leader's effect on a group ===
Stirling explores a leader's impact on an organization. Havel's small group organizes along military lines, brought on by Havel's time in the Marines, as they travel from the site of their plane crash in Idaho to the Larsson homestead in Oregon. The Mackenzie group adopts a Celtic clan structure to farm and fortify Juniper Mackenzie's family homestead, influenced by Wicca and Mackenzie's Celtic heritage.

=== Human dependency on technology ===
Stirling also explores humanity's dependence on modern technology and to what conditions we might be forced to regress if we were denied our advanced technology. Thomas Wagner, reviewing Dies the Fire, said the aftermath of Hurricane Katrina gave the novel "a degree of gravitas stronger than it would have had otherwise." Fredric Smoler, writing for American Heritage, notes that "reason still allows men and women the (sadly reduced) power to manipulate their environment", but "it is not obvious how a scientific (or feminist) worldview will survive in a newly feudalized, increasingly religious, and fundamentally agrarian world."

=== First world more likely to survive ===
Another theme of the series is that First World countries are likely to survive the Change better than Third World countries. Stirling speculates that the developed world is a larger repository of handicraft lore than the undeveloped world, because the latter group heavily relies on First World castoffs and is too busy on a day-to-day basis to keep up the old ways, while people in the First World have the leisure to become expert horse riders or bow makers. This idea is originally expressed in-character by people in former First World areas, and later in the series other characters remark that the assumption is unfounded based on exploration many years post-Change.

=== Myth and magic ===
In the novels, it often appears that magic exists in the world since the Change. When asked whether he was leaving room for magic in the Emberverse, Stirling replied that he could not answer that since he did not wish to give away any plot points, but admitted that by The Scourge of God, people will begin to decide whether or not "magic" is possible in the series. Critic Harriet Klausner described Scourge as being like a Greek tragedy due to certain characters receiving visions from "gods", incidents of demonic possessions, cursed arrows, and other uses of magic. In a dialogue between a mercenary and Tezcatlipoca, the Aztec deity reveals that humanity's lack of attention towards the gods allowed "monsters below the horizon" to bring about the Change. As the character of Father Ignatius says, however, there is always a rational explanation available: he notes that Ingolf's capture by Kuttner when Kuttner simply spoke a word at the end of The Sunrise Lands was probably the result of a post-hypnotic suggestion. Reviewer Dale Arnold of the Baltimore Science Fiction Society suggests that magic has real political and societal impact in the Emberverse, whether or not it is actually the result of supernatural force or merely religious delusions, because the characters act as if it were real.

As of The Sea Peoples (2017), "magic" is increasingly evident, yet still remains deniable by those of a rationalist mind who do not directly experience it. In particular, approximately half the action of this work takes place in alternate realms which are experienced only through the agency of shamanic magic.

== See also ==
- Alien space bats
- Ariel, a 1983 post-apocalyptic fantasy by Steve Boyett which was subtitled "A Novel of the Change"
- Revolution
- The Age of Misrule
