= The Sunrise Lands =

2007 novel by S. M. Stirling

- Author: S. M. Stirling
- Cover artist: Larry Rostant
- Language: English
- Series: The Emberverse series
- Genre: Science fiction novel
- Publisher: Roc Books
- Publication date: September 30, 2007
- Publication place: United States
- Media type: Print (Hardcover and Paperback)
- Pages: 464
- ISBN: 0-451-46170-3
- OCLC: 85822742
- Dewey Decimal: 813/.54 22
- LC Class: PS3569.T543 S86 2007
- Preceded by: A Meeting at Corvallis
- Followed by: The Scourge of God

The Sunrise Lands is a post-apocalyptic 2007 novel by alternate history author S. M. Stirling. It is the fourth novel set in the Emberverse series. The core of the story is a quest by the sons and daughters of all the main characters from the first trilogy, to travel across the face of a changed America all the way to Nantucket.

== Plot summary ==
Ingolf Vogeler, a mercenary from the Republic of Richland arrives in Mackenzie lands in the Willamette River region of Oregon. He is being stalked by soldiers from the Church Universal and Triumphant (known as Cutters), which is located in Paradise Valley, Montana, and controls parts of Montana and Wyoming. Ingolf arrives in a tavern run by Tom Brannigan, and during the night, is attacked by these soldiers. As he is attacked, Rudi Mackenzie, Mathilda Arminger, Odard Liu, and the twins Ritva and Mary Havel join the fray. Odard and Rudi kill several assassins until Rudi shouts to take one alive. The assassins realize they can't escape and commit suicide before the party can react. Odard and Rudi break the door that Ingolf is hidden behind, and take him to a hospital. Ingolf is saved, and he relates his tale to the Mackenzies.

It turns out that he had traveled to Nantucket with his mercenary company during an expedition to collect pre-Change relics. Along with two mercenary scouts (Kaur and Singh) and Kuttner, a guard of the bossman of Iowa travelling with the company, Ingolf saw a vision that told him to: Travel from sunrise to the sunset, and seek the Son of the Bear Who Rules. The Sword of the Lady waits for him.

The party traveled back to the mainland to hook up with the remainder of the mercenaries, but they were all found dead somewhere in Illinois. Ingolf led the party west, but they are stopped by Cutter forces. The party is then betrayed by the guard, Kuttner, who turns out to be a Cutter officer. While fleeing, Kaur is wounded, and she and her brother dismount and turn to hold off the Cutters while Ingolf flees. Kaur and Singh make Ingolf swear to avenge them. Ingolf is able to escape the Cutter forces due to the sacrifice of the scouts, however he is later captured and taken to the C.U.T capitol, but manages to escape later on.

Ingolf then arrived at Mackenzie territory and tells Juniper and Rudi Mackenzie his story. Both interpret the vision to mean that Rudi, who was prophesied to be the Sword of the Lady, has to go east to Nantucket. After a brief debate, Rudi, Ingolf, Mary, Ritva, and Edain Aylward, set off for Nantucket. As they travel, they split up, and meet back up at the house of John Brown, an important member of the Central Oregon Ranchers Association and ally of the Mackenzies. In the meantime Mathilda, Odard, as well as Odard's servant Alex, and the monk Father Ignatius, have joined the party, fleeing Protectorate territory and avoiding being brought back by Regent Arminger's men-at-arms.

The party travels further east saving a group of Mormons from Rovers, nomadic brigands of southeastern Oregon. They learn that the Church Universal and Triumphant are at war with the Mormon state of New Deseret and are on the verge of defeating them. Later the party runs into a Cutter army in southern Idaho. They warn President Thurston, leader of the United States of "Boise", who defeats the force with his personal soldiers while Rudi and Edain save him from an assassination attempt by his own guards.

The party travels to Boise to figure out why the Church wants Thurston dead, while Boise prepares for war against the Church. Taking the army of Boise south, Thurston meets with a demoralized Deseret army and agree to fight together against Cutter forces besieging the Deseret city of Twin Falls. During the combat, President Thurston is assassinated by his son, Martin Thurston, who is allied with the Cutters in an effort to make himself the dictator of Boise. Rudi and Thurston's younger son witness this and flee, warning the rest of the party. The party splits up to avoid being captured by the Cutters, traveling east and planning to meet up at a rally point. Mathilda, Odard, and Alex are cornered in a rocky ravine when Odard's horse is killed and Odard becomes injured. He and Mathilda turn to make a last stand, but Alex, under orders from Odard's mother to protect him at all costs, betrays them to the Cutters, and the trio are captured. Edain, Father Ignatius, Thurston's youngest son, Mary, and Ritva arrive at the rendezvous point but flee because of advancing Cutters. They encounter Boise forces and are taken in a pedal-powered airship to save Rudi from pursuing Cutter forces. In the meantime, Ingolf is captured by the Cutters, who are led by Kuttner, who mysteriously forces Ingolf to drop his machete and takes him prisoner.

Meanwhile, the forces of the C.U.T. succeed in breaching the walls of Twin Falls, capturing the city and on the orders of their leader the Prophet Sethaz, massacres the entire population.

== Literary significance and reception ==
As of September 7, 2008, the Pacific Northwest Booksellers Association and IndieBound list The Sunrise Lands as number nine on their list of mass market bestsellers in the Pacific Northwest for the week ending September 14, 2008.

== References to other works ==
- Rudi's company originally numbered nine companions, including himself, making reference to the eight companions of Frodo in The Fellowship of the Ring. The characters themselves make extensive reference to this.
- Rudi's company buys weapons from "The Weapon Shop of Isherman." This is a clear reference to AE Van Vogt's "The Weapon Shops of Isher."
