= Richland, Wisconsin =

Richland is the name of some places in the U.S. state of Wisconsin:

- Richland Center, Wisconsin, a city
- Richland, Richland County, Wisconsin, a town
- Richland, Rusk County, Wisconsin, a town
