= Conquistador (novel) =

2003 novel by S. M. Stirling

- First edition
- Author: S. M. Stirling
- Cover artist: Jonathan Barkat
- Language: English
- Genre: Alternate history
- Publisher: Roc Books
- Publication date: 2003
- Publication place: United States
- Media type: Print
- Pages: 608 (paperback)
- ISBN: 978-0-451-45933-6
- OCLC: 54617757

Conquistador is a 2003 alternate history novel by S. M. Stirling. Its point of divergence occurs when the empire of Alexander the Great endures long after Alexander's death, creating a markedly different history that prevents the European conquest of the Americas. Most of the story is set in the parallel universe affected by this history.

== Plot ==
John Rolfe VI is an infantry captain who comes back from World War II with a war wound and few prospects, but in 1946 a radio he is rewiring malfunctions and creates a gateway to a parallel universe. This universe is one in which Alexander the Great lived a full lifespan, creating an empire that stretched from Iberia to the Indian subcontinent. In this world, the Macedonian Empire proved so strong and durable that it redirected the barbarian migrations of the Goths, Vandals, and others eastward towards China and the rest of the Far East. As a result, what remains of China is a hodgepodge of Indo-European dominated states, the Americas remain undiscovered by the Old World, and technology has barely progressed to a medieval level. Deciding to take advantage of the untapped resources that await in this different California, Rolfe gathers members of his infantry company to help him explore and develop this new world. Over the next 60 years, he builds a new nation, which he calls the Commonwealth of New Virginia.

In 2009, two California fish and game officers, Tom Christiansen and Roy Tully, are trying to solve the mystery of how large numbers of pelts from endangered species are showing up. They finally deduce the secret of the gate to the parallel world, but before they can make the secret known to their superiors, they are kidnapped and permanently transported to New Virginia by Rolfe's granddaughter, Gate Security Agent Adrienne Rolfe (with whom Christiansen had been falling in love).

Once the two rangers get over their resentment of being forcibly and permanently removed from their lives and world, and being brought to this new world, Adrienne enlists them to help sabotage a coming coup in New Virginia. Giovanni Colletta, head of the second most powerful family, and son of a sleazy and amoral war buddy of Rolfe's, has resented the elder Rolfe's control, and he and some allies are planning to take over by force and violence, with the intention of imposing an authoritarian regime. The rangers decide that Rolfe and his allies are the lesser of two evils, and decide to help Adrienne in her effort to prevent the coup. The group discovers that Colletta is arming post-Aztec and post-Mayan Indians to build a couple of battalions of soldiers (something very illegal under Commonwealth law) in an attempt to capture the Gate, holding the Commonwealth hostage.

Colletta duly strikes, giving the other families the grounds to oppose him militarily. The revolt is put down, but at a price: the radio device and the Gateway are destroyed, and with it, the connection to our world. What little talent the Commonwealth has in physics works feverishly to re-establish the Gate. They are successful, but when they look through the new gate, they do not see FirstSide (New Virginia slang for Rolfe's home Earth) Oakland, but instead a snarling saber-toothed cat and a dead giant sloth.

== Commonwealth of New Virginia ==
=== History ===
While trying to fix his radio in his basement, Rolfe accidentally created a gate to an alternate California in which Europeans had yet to discover the Americas. After looking at the new world on the other side of the Gate by himself, Rolfe brought a dozen trusted members of his wartime platoon to see for themselves. Later, while camping in an alternate California after hunting and panning for gold, the group agreed to keep the "Gate" a secret. They believed (correctly) that they could exploit the wealth it offered them, and they recognized Rolfe as the leader of this endeavor.

Using one of his men's ties to the Mafia to cover up where they were getting the gold, Rolfe and his allies gained the starting capital necessary to start their own country. To protect the secret of the Gate, they bought up the residential area in Oakland around the Gate, converting it into an industrial complex. Immigration to "New Virginia", as they called it, began with close family members and friends of the men involved, but it later included settlers drawn from various ethnic groups looking for places to hide: fugitive Nazis, pieds-noirs, Afrikaners, Rhodesians, and former Russian communists.

By the present day in the novel, the Commonwealth of New Virginia had expanded across the new California, with outposts as far as Alaska and Colorado and colonies in Hawaii and Australia. The original founders of the country structured the government so that their families would remain in power long after those originals were dead, and they also adapted laws to causes and hobbies to which they were partial. One example was Rolfe's love of hunting, which encouraged him to partner with the San Diego Zoo to import large African animals, which he then moved through the Gate and released into the wilds of his new North America.

Farming and mining were the principal pillars of the Commonwealth economy, the latter being particularly profitable since the Commonwealth already knew the exact locations of gold and other mines because of the history of FirstSide.

=== Politics ===
The Commonwealth of New Virginia is described as a "feudal oligarchy" by one of the characters. It is a highly conservative state whose politics often clash with those of the main characters of the story. Power is held by the Thirty Families (which actually number 32) who make all of the decisions regarding the Commonwealth, though there is some limited democracy in the form of the House of Burgesses. The Rolfe Family is considered the leader of the families and thus has some influence over the others. All of the Families are led by the "Primes," or the head of family who is succeeded by the eldest adult male. All members of the Thirty Families who are not the Prime or heir are known as "Collaterals". Those not members of the Families are known as "Settlers". Most settlers declare loyalty to a certain family, but some are independent.

While there are some cities in the Commonwealth, they have been deliberately been kept small by Rolfe and the other Primes. This has been done to protect the environment from pollution and other ills. The largest city, Rolfeston, which is located where Berkeley would have been, has a population of only 28,000. The writings of the Southern Agrarian movement, as typified by the 1930 essay "I'll Take My Stand", are a guide for the development of the Commonwealth.

The demographics of the Commonwealth are primarily white with religions ranging from Protestant, Catholic, and Orthodox denominations of Christianity to Judaism. The antebellum-minded Rolfe has barred blacks from being allowed into the Commonwealth, but some have come involuntarily after discovering the Gate secret.

Only members of the Thirty Families, and not all of them, may travel between the worlds. Everyone else must stay in New Virginia for life. The Gate traffic is monitored and controlled by the Gate Security Force (GSF). The secret is so important that the GSF has the authority to execute even members of the Thirty Families on FirstSide without trial if they are doing something that could give away the secret.

As in our history, most Native Americans have suffered huge losses due to disease accidentally brought through the Gate. The Commonwealth does bring in workers from the Nahuatl speaking people to the south, but they are only allowed to stay temporarily. If they ever wish to reside permanently in the Commonwealth, they may do so, but are sterilized so they will not have a next generation. Without a second generation, the Nahuatl never learn how the Commonwealth operates, or understand how the New Virginians think, and so will not ever become a factor politically.
