= Steve Boyett =

American writer and disc jockey

Steven R. Boyett
- Also known as: DJ Steve Boyett
- Born: 1960 (age 65–66); Atlanta, Georgia
- Genres: Science; fiction; fantasy
- Occupations: Writer; disc jockey
- Website: www.steveboy.com

Steven R. Boyett, also known as DJ Steve Boyett, is a writer and disc jockey based in Northern California.

== Early work ==
Boyett sold his first novel, Ariel, at the age of 21, and went on to publish The Architect of Sleep, The Gnole (with illustrator Alan Aldridge), Elegy Beach (a sequel to Ariel), and many short stories and novellas. He has written Ren and Stimpy comics for Marvel and wrote the (uncredited) second draft of Toy Story 2. In the early 1990s his small-press imprint called Sneaker Press published chapbooks by poets Carrie Etter and the late Nancy Lambert.

Boyett had short work in the seminal splatterpunk anthologies Book of the Dead (ed. John Skipp and Craig Spector) and Silver Scream (ed. David Schow), and the foundational novella Prodigy in the influential "Borderland" shared-world fantasy anthology (ed. Terri Windling).

Boyett has taught fiction at UCLA Extension, Santa Monica Community College, and various workshops, including the annual La Jolla Writers Workshop. He posts and lectures frequently about New Media and the changing role of the writer in the digital age.

== Recent fiction ==
An expanded reprint of Ariel was published by Ace Books in August 2009, followed by a sequel, Elegy Beach, in November 2009. Mortality Bridge was published in July 2011 from Subterranean Press, and won the 2011 Emperor Norton Award for best novel by a San Francisco Bay area writer. Fata Morgana, a collaborative novel with director and artist Ken Mitchroney, was published by Blackstone in July 2017. According to his blog, Boyett is completing Avalon Burning, a new novel in the Change series that includes Ariel and Elegy Beach.

== DJ Mix series ==
Boyett is also an electronic dance music DJ known for his Podrunner podcast of dance music mixed either at constant BPM for exercise, or at varied BPM timed for training using High Intensity Interval Training (HIIT). Podrunner was arguably the first online music series intended for exercise, and was one of the world's most popular podcasts for nearly a decade following its debut in February 2006. It won awards on iTunes four years in a row (2006, 2007, 2008, 2009), and has been a Top 100 Podcast since its debut.

Groovelectric, Boyett's dance music podcast of what he calls "New Old Funk," features various styles of modern electronic dance music, including House, Progressive House, Tech House, Drum & Bass, and themed mixes. It was an iTunes Top 100 Music podcast for over a decade following its debut in February 2006.

As a DJ, Boyett has played clubs and events in many North American cities, as well as the annual Burning Man festival.

== Bibliography ==
=== Novels and collections ===
- Ariel (Ace Books, 1983, reprinted 2009)
- The Architect of Sleep (Ace Books, 1986)
- The Gnole (illustrated by Alan Aldridge) (William Heinemann, 1992)
- Elegy Beach (Ace/Putnam, 2009)
- Mortality Bridge (Subterranean Press, 2011)
- Fata Morgana (with Ken Mitchroney) (Blackstone Press, June 2017)

=== Short fiction collections ===
- Orphans (Scorpius Digital Books, 2001)

=== Humor ===
- Treks Not Taken (Harper Perennial, 1998) (Star Trek: The Next Generation parody book)

=== Short fiction ===
- "Hard Silver," Subterranean Magazine, Winter, 2013
- "Talking Back to the Moon," Urban Fantasy (Tachyon Publications, August, 2011)
- "Not Last Night but the Night Before," Subterranean: Tales of Dark Fantasy 2, ed. William Shafer (Subterranean Press, April 2011)
- "The View from On High," The Magazine of Fantasy & Science Fiction, Aug 2000, online reprint April 2009
- "Current Affairs," The Magazine of Fantasy & Science Fiction, Jan 1998
- "Drifting Off the Coast of New Mexico," Asimov's, June 1995
- "Ithaca Bound," Tampa Review #6, Winter 1995
- "Epiphany Beach," The Magazine of Fantasy & Science Fiction, May 1994
- "The Madonna of Port Lligat," Asimov's, June 1994
- "Man Overboard," Tampa Review #4, Spring 1993
- "Like Pavlov's Dogs," Book of the Dead, ed. John Skipp & Craig Spector, Bantam, 1989; Zeising Press limited hardcover, 1989. Reprinted in Zombies, ed. John Skipp, Oct. 2009, Black Dog/Leventhal Press
- "Emerald City Blues," Midnight Graffiti, Fall, 1988; reprinted in Best of Midnight Graffiti, New American Library, Oct 1992
- "The Answer Tree," Silver Scream, ed. David J. Schow, Tor, 1988; Dark Harvest limited hardcover, 1988
- "True Allegiance," Aboriginal Science Fiction, Nov.-Dec. 1988
- "Minutes of the Last Meeting at Olduvai Gorge," Aboriginal Science Fiction, 1987; reprinted in Best of Aboriginal, 1988
- "Prodigy," Borderland, ed. Terri Windling, Signet, 1986; Tor Books reprint, Dec 1992
- "Bridge," Færy, ed. Terri Windling, Berkley, 1985
- "Rocinante," Elsewhere Volume III, ed. Terri Windling, Berkley, 1984

=== Screenplays ===
- Toy Story 2 (second draft), Pixar/Disney Studios, 1999

=== Comic books ===
- Ren & Stimpy Quarterly Special #4, Marvel, Jan 1995
- Ren & Stimpy Quarterly Special #2, Marvel, June 1994
- Ren & Stimpy #16, Marvel, Marvel, Jan 1994
- Space Ark #5, Apple Comics, 1990

=== Podcasts ===
- Podrunner
- Podrunner: Intervals
- Groovelectric
