= The Protector's War =

2005 novel by Stephen Michael Stirling

- First edition
- Author: S. M. Stirling
- Cover artist: Jonathan Barkat
- Language: English
- Series: The Emberverse series
- Genre: Alternate history, Science fiction
- Publisher: Roc Books
- Publication date: September 6, 2005
- Publication place: United States
- Media type: Print (Paperback and Hardcover)
- Pages: 496
- ISBN: 0-451-46046-4
- OCLC: 58791229
- Dewey Decimal: 813/.54 22
- LC Class: PS3569.T543 P76 2005
- Preceded by: Dies the Fire
- Followed by: A Meeting at Corvallis

The Protector's War is a 2005 alternate history, post-apocalyptic, science fiction novel by American writer S.M. Stirling. It is the second novel in the Emberverse series. The Protector's War describes the events of roughly a year, some eight years after the Change which altered the laws of physics in Dies the Fire. It describes the preparations of the Portland Protective Association for a war of conquest against the other communities of the Willamette Valley, their actions in response, and the arrival of three English refugees whose coming will help shape events in Oregon.

== Plot summary ==
Eight years after the Change, Clan Mackenzie, led by Juniper Mackenzie, and the Bearkillers, headed by Mike Havel, have established themselves in the Willamette Valley. They have become bitter enemies of the much larger, expansion-minded Portland Protective Association (PPA), led by the Armingers. The barons of the PPA constantly violate a ceasefire with the other factions. During one of their raids, Eddie Liu, Baron and Marchwarden of the PPA, is confronted by a small group of Mackenzies, led by Eilir Mackenzie and Astrid Larsson. After a short skirmish, Liu leaves, again swearing revenge against the Clan.

In the meantime, in Great Britain, Sir Nigel Loring is imprisoned by the mad King Charles III, but is rescued by his son Alleyne Loring and John Hordle, formerly of the Special Air Service. They leave England aboard a Tasmanian sailing ship, which is conducting a worldwide survey. On their arrival in Portland, Arminger pressures Sir Nigel, who is the closest thing to an expert on nerve gas, to help him recover some of it to use against his enemies. The British trio outwit Arminger and escape to the south.

Mike Havel and his wife Signe Larsson Havel try to lure Crusher Bailey, a bandit who has been raiding and taking slaves, into a trap by masquerading as travelers with a herd of horses and a wagon of valuables. When Bailey takes the bait, Mike and Signe's reinforcements are delayed and they have to retreat to the ruins of an abandoned pornographic video store. Just before they are overrun, they are saved by the timely intervention of the Lorings and Hordle. Sir Nigel and his son meet the Mackenzies and their old friend Sam Aylward, who was formerly a sergeant under Sir Nigel. The Mackenzies tell of their raid, where they ambushed a horse-drawn train and unexpectedly captured Norman Arminger's only child and heir, Mathilda.

Soon after, Eddie Liu and his massive bodyguard Mack arrive on a diplomatic mission to negotiate Mathilda's release. Astrid Larsson and Eilir Mackenzie and their small band of Rangers discover signs of a PPA group hiding nearby. Liu fires nerve gas at the guards, killing all of them, and frees Mathilda. Despite the danger, Liu searches Rudi Mackenzie's tent for a book that Mathilda gave Rudi, which contains the key needed to decode PPA plans that have fallen into Clan hands. A fight breaks out. Mack seriously wounds Rudi before he is killed by Hordle, and Liu is killed by Eilir Mackenzie. The Bearkillers arrive soon after and mop up the remaining PPA knights. Rudi is saved by Signe, who overcomes her distaste for him and saves his life with an immediate blood transfusion. The book ends with Rudi's initiation into Wicca.

== References to other works ==
- Stirling continues to make references to The Lord of the Rings by J. R. R. Tolkien, this time with Astrid and Eilir forming the Dúnedain Rangers.
- A character on the boat that Nigel, Alleyne and John flee on has a crewmember named "Dominique Flandry," a nod to Poul Anderson's character Dominic Flandry.
- The names of the British refugees and other characters appear to be based on the characters Samkin Aylward, Sir Nigel Loring, Maude Loring, Alleyne Edricson, Hordle John, and Robert Knolles from Arthur Conan Doyle's The White Company.
- The book which is used by the Protector's forces as the key to their encrypted plans is Bored of the Rings, Harvard Lampoon's parody of The Lord of the Rings.
- Arminger is a follower of the Evil Overlord List.
- When discussing whether people are getting into the "right" sept, Juniper jokingly suggests that they could enchant a talking hat to sort people. Arguably a reference to Harry Potter.
