= S. M. Stirling =

Canadian-American science fiction and fantasy author (born 1953)

- Stirling at Dragon Con in 2026
- Born: September 30, 1953 (age 72); Metz, France
- Occupation: Writer
- Spouse: Jan Stirling (died 2021)
- Writing career
- Period: 1980s–present
- Genres: Science fiction, fantasy, alternate history
- Website: www.smstirling.com

Stephen Michael Stirling (born September 30, 1953) is a Canadian-American science fiction and fantasy author who was born in France. Stirling is the author of the Draka series of alternate history novels, the later time travel/alternate history Nantucket series and the Emberverse series.

== Early life and education ==
Stirling was born on September 30, 1953, in Metz, France—then the site of a Royal Canadian Air Force base—to an English mother and Canadian father. He has lived in several countries and currently resides in the United States in New Mexico.

Stirling, along with Eric Flint, was tuckerized as a Secret Service agent in John Birmingham's alternate history WWII novel Weapons of Choice (2004).

== Career ==
Stirling's novels are generally conflict-driven and often describe military situations and militaristic cultures. In addition to his books' military, adventure, and exploration focus, he often describes societies with cultural values significantly different from modern Western views. One of his recurring topics is the influence of the culture on an individual's outlook and values, with an emphasis on the idea that most people and societies consider themselves moral.

Stirling frequently explores technological development within the context of many of his novels. The Draka, for instance, choose and face a different imperative in their conquest of Africa, and turn earlier to breech-loading firearms and steam power than the rest of the Western world. The stranded islanders of the Nantucket series try to rebuild their technological base once the island is thrown back in time to 1250 BC, while the survivors of the "Event" now face a world where electricity, firearms, and internal combustion no longer work.

Stirling also tends to write strong female characters who have prominent roles within the story.

In the past, he has frequently collaborated with other authors, including David Drake, Jerry Pournelle, Anne McCaffrey, and Raymond E. Feist.
