= Blood of Tyrants =

2013 novel by Naomi Novik

- First edition cover
- Author: Naomi Novik
- Cover artist: Craig D. Howell (Del Rey hardback above); Dominic Harman (Voyager trade paperback / e-book)
- Language: English
- Series: Temeraire
- Genres: Alternate history; fantasy
- Publisher: Del Rey (US); Voyager (UK)
- Publication date: August 13, 2013 (US); April 10, 2014 (UK)
- Publication place: United States
- Media type: Print (hardcover); e-Book (Kindle, nook); Audiobook
- Pages: 431
- ISBN: 978-0345522894
- Preceded by: Crucible of Gold
- Followed by: League of Dragons

Blood of Tyrants is the eighth novel in the Temeraire alternate history/fantasy series by American author Naomi Novik. It was first published by Voyager Books in August 2013. This installment features the adventures of William Laurence and his dragon, Temeraire, in Japan, China, and Russia, as they attempt to muster up new allies in the year 1812.

== Plot details ==
William Laurence awakens on the shores of Japan. He finds himself in great confusion: afflicted with retrograde amnesia, he remembers nothing of how he came to know Chinese nor how he arrived on these shores. He is brought before the local magistrate, Kaneko Hiromasa, and kept in genteel imprisonment for straying outside Nagasaki, the sole port currently open to European traders. Temeraire, meanwhile, works with the other dragons of his formation to put to rights the Potentate, their dragon transport, which has run aground on a reef during a storm. Having made the ship seaworthy again, they set sail for Nagasaki, where diplomat Arthur Hammond wishes to make some overtures and to locate Laurence. They receive assistance in this matter from a friendly American dragon, John Wampanoag, a merchant captain attempting to expand his business into Japan. However, the only word is that Laurence has escaped: as Kaneko broke the law in giving shelter to a foreigner, his young retainer, Junichiro, absconded with Laurence to protect his master's honor. Temeraire feels additionally slowed by concern for Iskierka, who, after their mating in the previous novel, has produced an egg which must be cared for.

Through a series of misadventures involving timber for Potentate's repairs, ongoing dragon surveillance and a lot of Western posturing, Laurence and Temeraire eventually reunite, but Temeraire is dismayed to learn that Laurence has no memory of him, and Laurence dismayed to learn that, in the eight years lost from his memory, he became a member of the Aerial Corps. Though the two quickly renew their friendship, the other captains remain stilted in Laurence's company, talking around subjects which would potentially cause him discomfort. However, Laurence applies himself willingly to the diplomatic mission at hand: he, an honorary son of the Jiaqing Emperor, is to visit Peking in hopes of forming an alliance between China and the United Kingdom. No sooner has he arrived than he is swept up in local politics; conservatives are attempting to assassinate the heir to the throne, Prince Mianning (the future Daoguang Emperor), using Western decoys as their catspaws. Temeraire is also concerned to learn that Lung Tien Chuan, his twin brother and one of only eight Celestials alive, has died of poisoning. This assassination has attacked Mianning's legitimacy, as an Emperor must have a Celestial companion and there are now none to spare; to this end, Temeraire consents to couple with Lung Qin Mei, an Imperial he had grown fond of during his last sojourn in China, to attempt to breed a new one.

Chinese General Fela reports that the White Lotus Rebellion remains active; the Jiaqing Emperor assigns Laurence and Temeraire as royal liaisons to a Chinese army being sent south to pacify the situation. Under the overall command of General Chu, an experienced dragon who helped put down the original rebellion in 1804, the joint British-Chinese force moves out, allowing the British contingent a chance to see the Chinese military at work. They unmask the "rebellion" as a front for illegal smuggling operations. Additionally, matters between Temeraire and Laurence deteriorate when Temeraire confesses the great treason he and Laurence committed in Empire of Ivory. Laurence feels torn between the nobility of their actions and the hostility of their reception, while Temeraire berates himself for having reminded Laurence of something he clearly wished to forget. Temeraire flees the scene, upset, and so happens upon Arkady, one of the Turkish ferals, imprisoned; he is then set upon by dragons of the Chinese army. After fighting them off, he and Laurence reconcile and realize that the entire rebellion is a "false flag operation" designed by Chinese conservatives, led by General Fela, to discredit the British. Laurence is more concerned with the news that Arkady was ferrying Tenzing Tharkay as a courier, and with what news Tharkay might have; with General Chu's help, they stage a raid on the last remaining holdout of the rebellious forces, at Blue Crane mountain, and there discover Tharkay imprisoned. Tharkay's dispatches indeed prove dire: Napoleon's invasion of Russia is due to launch in but one month. However, Tharkay's discovery aids Laurence in helping his memory to return.

With Iskierka's egg safely bestowed into Chinese care, Laurence and Temeraire, accompanied by General Chu and a newly mustered army, head northwest to Russia, whilst the rest of Lily's formation returns to the Potentate to give aid in Portugal. Because of Britain's inability to support Prussia during the War of the Fourth Coalition (as covered in Black Powder War), the Russians treat Hammond's promises of 300 Chinese dragons with some skepticism. When the Chinese units arrive, they help to force a stalemate at the Battle of Borodino; however, the Russians are outflanked by General Saint-Cyr advancing from occupied St. Petersburg (for which Napoleon makes him a Marshal of France), and are forced to fall back, abandoning Moscow. Additionally, Laurence discovers the terrible conditions of the Russian breeding grounds, in which dragons are kept on starvation rations and hobbled via metal spikes through their wings. He proposes to General Kutuzov that conditions be improved; he is somewhat surprised when Kutuzov agrees wholeheartedly, and attempts to bring the Russian ferals to bear on the French. However, the French have also learned of the situation, and are able to orchestrate attacks on the Russian supply-lines simply by freeing the beasts to do as they please. Though Laurence and Temeraire succeed in capturing Marshal Murat (whom the Tsar exiles to Tobolsk) and his dragon Liberté, this does not prevent Napoleon from advancing on the Russian position at Kaluga. The novel ends with Temeraire and Laurence deep in Russia, low on provender, and the first snow of the fateful winter of 1812/1813 beginning to fall.

== Reception ==
The book was reviewed in:

- Review by Faren Miller (2013) in Locus, #631 August 2013
- Review by Paul Di Filippo (2013) in The Speculator, (2018)
- Review by Don Sakers (2013) in Analog Science Fiction and Fact, November 2013
- Review by Carolyn Cushman (2014) in Locus, #637 February 2014
