= Tongues of Serpents =

Novel by Naomi Novik

- First hardcover edition cover
- Author: Naomi Novik
- Cover artist: Dominic Harman (Del Rey hardcover above); Andrew Davidson (Voyager hardback)
- Language: English
- Series: Temeraire
- Genres: Alternate history; fantasy
- Publisher: Del Rey (US); Voyager (UK)
- Publication date: July 13, 2010 (US); September 2, 2010 (UK)
- Publication place: United States
- Media type: Print (hardcover); e-Book (Kindle, nook); Audiobook
- Pages: 288
- ISBN: 978-0345496898
- Preceded by: Victory of Eagles
- Followed by: Crucible of Gold

Tongues of Serpents is the sixth novel in the Temeraire alternate history/fantasy series by American author Naomi Novik. This installment follows William Laurence and his dragon, Temeraire's adventures in Australia.

Tongues of Serpents was released in hardcover and e-Book formats in North America and the United Kingdom by Voyager Books on July 13, 2010.

== Plot details ==
The story begins in New South Wales, where Laurence has been sentenced to "transportation" for his treasonous actions in Empire of Ivory. With him is Temeraire; Captain Granby and his firebreathing Kazilik Iskierka; Tenzing Tharkay, his half-Nepalese friend; Tom Riley, captain of HMS Allegiance which sailed them hence; and three dragon eggs, sent by Admiral Jane Roland to form the foundation of New South Wales' Aerial Corps. Dropping by Van Diemen's Land to resupply, Allegiance discovered William Bligh, late of HMS Bounty, exiled there after being deposed in a military coup, and have since borne him to Sydney. Bligh wishes for Laurence to restore him to the governorship, whereas Colonel John Macarthur, architect of the rebellion, wishes them to stay on the sidelines, awaiting a decision from London.

Captain Jeremy Rankin, last seen in His Majesty's Dragon, arrives on a mission to take command of the nascent covert and whichever dragon births first. It turns out to be the child of Arkady and Wringe, two of the Turkish ferals. Temeraire, speaking to the unhatched dragonet through the shell, attempts to convince him to reject Rankin as his handler, citing Rankin's callous mistreatment of his former mount Levitas, but the dragon accepts Rankin on grounds of his great wealth, giving himself the grandiose name of "Caesar" (after rejecting "Conquistador"). Laurence and Granby observe privately that the greedy Caesar and supercilious Rankin deserve each other. Macarthur sends Laurence on an expedition to find a pass from Sydney through the Blue Mountains, which the aviators readily undertake to stay out of the political fray; they are granted a crew of convicts to provide manual labor. Tharkay asks to join them, eventually revealing that he has been tasked with tracking down a smuggling ring that operates out of China — and not out of Canton, the sole Chinese port open to foreigners. The two missions unite when one of the remaining dragon eggs, a Yellow Reaper, is stolen in the night by aborigines, prompting a frantic pursuit across the continent. The unforgiving Australian desert, the unpredictable weather, and the local fauna, particularly the mythical bunyips, take a dire toll on the crew. While the thieves are obviously familiar with the terrain, the Britons are not, and it soon becomes clear that the bunyips possess the ability to alter the terrain, providing watering holes as bait, and later diverting water to create quicksand beneath Temeraire in the hopes of entrapping him.

The final egg, an experimental cross between a Parnassian and a Cheqeured Nettle, hatches a sickly runt who is unable to fly. Rankin decides to do away with it humanely; however, Demane claims it for himself, naming it Kulingile. Kulingile eats enormously, growing at a rapid pace, and eventually develops the buoyant sacs which help dragons to fly. These sacs are enormous enough to allow him to float, and Dorset, the dragon surgeon, announces that only dragonets destined to become the heaviest of heavy-weights ever exhibit negative total body weight in this way. This creates further difficulties for Demane, as officers who dismissed the runt to his care now envy him his heavyweight dragon and attempt to suborn Kulingile from him.

The British finally catch sight of the thieves near Uluru and chase them northwards to the northern coast. There they find the source of Tharkay's smuggling ring: a port, operated jointly by the Larrakia people and the Chinese themselves, using trained sea serpents to ferry cargo from China. The Yellow Reaper is there as well; she has already hatched and bonded with the Larrakia, calling herself Tharunka, and declines to return to the Aerial Corps, though she is of material benefit in helping Temeraire establish diplomatic ties with the Larrakia. (As a Celestial, he has absolutely no trouble commanding the respect of the Chinese.) Laurence is relieved of the burden of reporting this when HMS Nereide arrives with orders to seize the port by force. However, the bombardment is completely thwarted by the Chinese, by the simple expedient of unleashing the sea serpents against the Nereide, and Laurence and the Nereide are politely but firmly asked to leave. Upon return to Sydney, Laurence discovers that Bligh's replacement, Lachlan Macquarie, is intent on fighting the Chinese over the port, which leads to another rebellion. Macarthur is reinstalled as First Minister of Australia, with him proclaiming the colony's loyalty to the King. Iskierka is ordered to Brazil to counter Napoleon's latest plans there, whilst Macarthur attempts to entice Laurence into taking a position with the nascent Australian government. Laurence refuses, merely seeking a quiet retirement with Temeraire in the Australian countryside.

== Reception ==
The book received several reviews:

- Review by Carolyn Cushman (2010) in Locus, #593 June 2010
- Review by Faren Miller (2010) in Locus,#594 July 2010
- Review [Dutch] by Jan van 't Ent (2011) in Holland-SF 2011, #1
- Review by Greg L. Johnson (2011) in The New York Review of Science Fiction, May 2011
