= Crucible of Gold =

Novel by Naomi Novik

- First edition cover
- Author: Naomi Novik
- Cover artist: Craig D. Howell (Del Rey hardback above); Dominic Harman (Voyager trade paperback / e-book)
- Language: English
- Series: Temeraire
- Genres: Alternate history; fantasy
- Publisher: Del Rey (US); Voyager (UK)
- Publication date: March 6, 2012 (US); April 10, 2014 (UK)
- Publication place: United States
- Media type: Print (hardcover); e-Book (Kindle, nook); Audiobook
- Pages: 336
- ISBN: 978-0345522863
- Preceded by: Tongues of Serpents
- Followed by: Blood of Tyrants

Crucible of Gold is the seventh novel in the Temeraire alternate history/fantasy series by American author Naomi Novik. It was first published in the United States by Del Rey. This installment features the adventures of William Laurence and his dragon, Temeraire, in South America.

Crucible of Gold was released in hardcover and e-Book formats in North America and the United Kingdom by Voyager Books on March 6, 2012.

== Plot details ==
William Laurence and Temeraire, who have decided to make a pastoral life for themselves in the British colony of New South Wales, are disturbed by the arrival of the diplomat Arthur Hammond, lately assigned to China, who bears dire news. The Portuguese colony of Brazil is besieged by forces allied to Napoleon Bonaparte, but not belonging to him: the Emperor of France has found common cause with the Tswana, now undisputed masters of the African continent. Their stated desire of retrieving all Africans captured and sold by the slave trade has brought them to Brazil, where the Crown Prince of Portugal, João, has sought refuge. As Portugal itself is the safe harbor to Britain's latest plan, a ground offensive into France itself, Brazil's safety is of paramount importance, and Hammond restores Laurence's commission and captaincy to address the crisis.

Temeraire and Kulingile, with their much-reduced air and ground crews, rejoin with Iskierka aboard the Allegiance, which begins to make its way east. Unfortunately, Captain Riley's crew is undependable, and after weathering a five-day gale, breaches in discipline lead to a drunken galley fire; the ship is lost, with only the most drunken and irresponsible hands saved, as Laurence had ordered them aboard Temeraire for disciplinary action. The three dragons fly east for three days straight, eventually collapsing aboard the nearest ship they can find; alas, it is the French transport Triomphe, bearing a diplomatic envoy of Chrétien-Louis-Joseph de Guignes and Juliette Récamier to the Inca Empire, and Temeraire's company are marooned on a small island for later retrieval. Only the discovery of a wrecked pirate ship, its maps still legible, allows Laurence to chart a course back to the mainland.

On Incan soil, the Britons must deal with lingering distrust towards Europeans thanks to the uncouth actions of Francisco Pizarro; the empire has managed to survive those depredations, but smallpox has further depleted their numbers. Most ayllu, formerly partnerships between humans and dragons, are now ruled solely by dragons, who are so jealous of "their" humans that kidnapping is now something of a norm. Hammond begins to make diplomatic endeavors towards the Sapa Inca, aided by Iskierka, who soaks up popular acclaim for her dueling prowess. Eventually, it is revealed that the empress, widow of the former monarch but now ruler in her own right, is being pressured by her court to take up a consort, and Iskierka, obsessed with wealth and social acclaim, proposes her captain Granby as a suitor. As such a match would be greatly desirable to British fortunes, Granby is pressured into the role, despite a private confession to Laurence of his own homosexuality, and the two are practically at the altar when a new suitor arrives to press his claim: Napoleon himself, lately divorced from Joséphine de Beauharnais and eligible for remarriage. The British are sent away while she contemplates her new prospects; the first and only sign of her decision are Incan troops advancing upon their encampment.

Escaping largely by the assistance of Churki, an Incan dragon who has adopted Hammond into her ayllu, the British party travel to Belém and from there to Rio de Janeiro, only to find it already occupied by the Tswana, led particularly by Kefentse, the dragon responsible for Laurence's captivity during the events of Empire of Ivory. With Napoleon and the Inca now poised to attack from the south, Laurence advocates to Prince João an immediate treaty with the Tswana, the only military force which can possibly defend Brazil, even after the arrival of Lily, Maximus and the rest of Temeraire's former formation. Of course, to gain the Tswana's allegiance, Brazil must accept manumission of their slaves; and the Tswana refuse to ally unless the Britons can promise what Napoleon has: immediate sea passage to all Africans, human or dragon, wishing to return home. Laurence decides the matter by seizing the two full-size dragon transports, the Polonaise and the Maréchal, Napoleon had detailed to the task. With Britain in control of the seas, Hammond manages to convince the Portuguese into accepting the new bargain.

As the novel ends, Laurence is approached by Gong Su, the cook he and Temeraire hired when they left China during Black Powder War. He reveals that he is a servant of Prince Mianning, son of the Jiaqing Emperor and heir-apparent to China; Gong Su suggests a return to the Middle Kingdom to discuss Napoleon's ongoing conquest of the world. Hammond sees the chance to forge an alliance with China, and he, Temeraire and Laurence resolve to go.

== Reception ==
The book was reviewed in:

- Review by Faren Miller (2012) in Locus, #616 May 2012
