= Locus Award for Best First Novel =

Literary award by Locus magazine

The Locus Award for Best First Novel is one of the annual Locus Awards presented by the science fiction and fantasy magazine Locus. Awards presented in a given year are for works published in the previous calendar year. The award for Best First Novel was first presented in 1981. The Locus Awards have been described as a prestigious prize in science fiction, fantasy and horror literature.

== Winners ==
Award winners
Year	Novel	Author	Ref.
1981	Dragon's Egg	Robert L. Forward	
1982	Starship & Haiku	Somtow Sucharitkul	
1983	Courtship Rite	Donald Kingsbury	
1984	Tea with the Black Dragon	R. A. MacAvoy	
1985	The Wild Shore	Kim Stanley Robinson	
1986	Contact	Carl Sagan	
1987	The Hercules Text	Jack McDevitt	
1988	War for the Oaks	Emma Bull	
1989	Desolation Road	Ian McDonald	
1990	Orbital Decay	Allen Steele	
1991	In the Country of the Blind	Michael F. Flynn	
1992	The Cipher	Kathe Koja	
1993	China Mountain Zhang	Maureen F. McHugh	
1994	Cold Allies	Patricia Anthony	
1995	Gun, with Occasional Music	Jonathan Lethem	
1996	The Bohr Maker	Linda Nagata	
1997	Reclamation	Sarah Zettel	
1997	Whiteout	Sage Walker	
1998	The Great Wheel	Ian R. MacLeod	
1999	Brown Girl in the Ring	Nalo Hopkinson	
2000	The Silk Code	Paul Levinson	
2001	Mars Crossing	Geoffrey A. Landis	
2002	Kushiel's Dart	Jacqueline Carey	
2003	A Scattering of Jades	Alexander C. Irvine	
2004	Down and Out in the Magic Kingdom	Cory Doctorow	
2005	Jonathan Strange & Mr Norrell	Susanna Clarke	
2006	Hammered / Scardown / Worldwired	Elizabeth Bear	
2007	Temeraire: His Majesty's Dragon/ Throne of Jade/Black Powder War	Naomi Novik	
2008	Heart-Shaped Box	Joe Hill	
2009	Singularity's Ring	Paul Melko	
2010	The Windup Girl	Paolo Bacigalupi	
2011	The Hundred Thousand Kingdoms	N. K. Jemisin	
2012	The Night Circus	Erin Morgenstern	
2013	Throne of the Crescent Moon	Saladin Ahmed	
2014	Ancillary Justice	Ann Leckie	
2015	The Memory Garden	M. Rickert	
2016	The Grace of Kings	Ken Liu	
2017	Ninefox Gambit	Yoon Ha Lee	
2018	The Strange Case of the Alchemist's Daughter	Theodora Goss	
2019	Trail of Lightning	Rebecca Roanhorse	
2020	Gideon the Ninth	Tamsyn Muir	
2021	Elatsoe	Darcie Little Badger	
2022	A Master of Djinn	P. Djèlí Clark	
2023	The Mountain in the Sea	Ray Nayler	
2024	The Saint of Bright Doors	Vajra Chandrasekera	
2025	Someone You Can Build a Nest In	John Wiswell	
2026	Sour Cherry	Natalia Theodoridou	

== See also ==
- Locus Award
