= The Thinking Woman's Guide to Real Magic =

2013 novel by Emily Croy Barker

- First edition
- Author: Emily Croy Barker
- Cover artist: Tal Goretsky
- Language: English
- Publisher: Pamela Dorman Books
- Publication date: 2013
- Publication place: United States
- Media type: Print (hardcover)
- Pages: 563 pp
- ISBN: 978-0143125679
- OCLC: 861478538
- Dewey Decimal: 813/.6
- LC Class: PS3602.A77548

The Thinking Woman's Guide to Real Magic is a fantasy novel by Emily Croy Barker. The novel takes place in the 21st century and centers around a woman named Nora, who accidentally wanders into a magical land. The story involves themes such as magic, social commentary, and romance. The novel makes several references to Jane Austen's Pride and Prejudice.

== Plot summary ==
Nora Fisher is an English teacher trying to earn her PhD in Literature when her boyfriend, Adam, breaks up with her. Nora must attend a wedding that weekend, but while she and her friends stay at a cabin she goes for a walk, carrying an old copy of Pride and Prejudice with her, and loses her way in the woods. She wanders into a graveyard and reads aloud a poem inscribed upon a tombstone. Upon leaving the graveyard, Nora discovers a garden and meets a woman named Ilissa, who invites Nora to her house and insists that Nora attend their party that night. Given a beautiful dress and a miraculous makeover, Nora meets a splendid company of people at the party that night, including Raclin, Ilissa's handsome son. Nora soon forgets about the wedding, and her teaching, and stays at Ilissa's house for an indefinite amount of time, attending parties nearly every night and going hunting with her new friends in the day. She also becomes engaged to Raclin.

One day Nora strays from their hunting party and a team of men seize her. They report her to two men: Lord Luklren, and a magician named Aruendiel. They let her go, but Aruendiel warns Nora not to trust Ilissa and her people, a warning that Nora ignores. She marries Raclin and soon becomes pregnant, but one night she has an argument with Raclin because she suspects him of carrying on with other women. Raclin suddenly reveals himself to be a dragon and attacks her, and she falls down a flight of stairs. Ilissa and her people carry her to a bed, fearing that she has had a miscarriage. Nora sends a plea for help to Aruendiel by means of his token, a feather, and a tremendous gust of wind spirits Nora away from Ilissa's house.

After flying for over an hour, Nora falls into a courtyard and the magician Aruendiel takes her into his castle and removes what is left of Raclin's child from her body, assuring her that the birth of such a child would have killed her. A woman named Mrs. Toristel takes care of Nora while the latter recovers. Aruendiel explains that Ilissa and her son and guests are Faitoren, magical creatures who cast illusions and specialize in manipulating people. The fancy clothes and beautiful appearances of their parties were illusions, and they had used Nora as a birth mother for Raclin's child, in an attempt to breed more of their species. Aruendiel also explains that they are currently speaking the Ors language, which Nora somehow picked up while under a variety of Ilissa's enchantments; she continues to understand Ors, even after Aruendiel removes Ilissa's spells. The castle lies in a place called the Uland, part of a larger territory called the Northlands. Neither Mrs. Toristel nor Aruendiel knows anything about the United States.

Stuck in this alternate land with no technology, Nora gardens and cooks to earn her keep at Aruendiel's castle. Nora finds she still has her wedding ring, which will not come off her finger. Another magician, Hirizjahkinis, invites Aruendiel to Semr, the king's realm, and Aruendiel reluctantly takes Nora with him to keep an eye on her. At Semr they debate about whether to declare war on the Faitoren or cut a deal with them. Aruendiel, who severely distrusts the Faitoren, staunchly opposes King Abele's desire to maintain a peaceful alliance with them. Nora inexplicably finds her copy of Pride and Prejudice in the royal library, and eventually she begins to translate it into Ors so that Aruendiel can sample the literature of her world. While in Semr, Nora has an unpleasant encounter with Ilissa, and then finds out that most people assume that Nora is Aruendiel's mistress.

Nora gradually finds out that Aruendiel once had a wife, but murdered her when she had an affair with another man. Aruendiel once also had an affair with Ilissa herself. Back in Uland, Nora expresses interest in learning magic, and Aruendiel challenges Nora by smashing a bowl and telling her to fix it with magic. When she finally manages to fix the bowl, Aruendiel begins to give, impatiently, a series of lessons in magic to Nora. He explains that whereas a wizard captures spirits and forces them to work for him, a magician depends upon his or her own connection with the elements in order to shape them as he or she desires. He refers to the elemental magic as “true magic” and distrusts the use of spirits and demons in wizardry.

One day Aruendiel receives word that the magician Hirizjahkinis and Hirgus Ext, a wizard, have paid a visit to Ilissa's house. Ilissa claims to have taken the two as prisoners and sends Aruendiel a list of demands, including that he return Nora to the Faitoren. Aruendiel refuses the demands and attacks Ilissa himself, but Hirizjahkinis and Hirgus Ext escape without his help. Ilissa tried to trick them into lifting the magical boundaries around the Faitoren realm, or else hoped to force Aruendiel to lift the boundaries. Aruendiel then leaves to visit Lord Luklren in order to make sure that the magician Dorneng Hul is properly maintaining those boundaries. While he is gone, Nora fixes a series of items in the village in order to raise money to buy a new pair of boots, an act which Aruendiel, upon returning, condemns as petty and pretentious. Aruendiel turns Nora out of the house but eventually relents and lets her stay. Dorneng Hul visits Aruendiel's castle to discuss the problem of the Faitoren, and he attempts to remove the wedding ring on Nora's finger, with disastrous results that are only resolved when they place the ring back on her finger. They soon celebrate the Null Days, a sort of nihilistic winter solstice holiday, and Nora cannot shake a strange romantic attraction to Aruendiel.

Ilissa tricks Dorneng Hul into releasing Ilissa from her magical barriers. Dorneng Hul, Hirizjahkinis, and Aruendiel set out to recapture Ilissa, leaving Nora and Mrs. Toristel behind. However, a few days after they leave, Hirizjahkinis returns to bring Nora with her, insisting that Aruendiel wants Nora's help. As soon as Nora leaves the safety of the castle, Hirizjahkinis turns out to be Ilissa in disguise, who kidnaps Nora and takes her to a barren, snowy landscape. There Ilissa and Raclin meet with Dorneng Hul, who has been working with Ilissa the entire time. They plan to kill Nora and enslave her spirit, forcing it to hold open a gateway between their world and Nora's world. Nora realizes that when she had read aloud the inscription on the tombstone, she had activated the power of an enslaved spirit in order to travel to this alternate, magical world; but the Faitoren cannot use that spirit, because an iron fence blocks the graveyard and the Faitoren cannot bear the touch of iron. Using a gateway powered by Nora's spirit, the Faitoren would be able to spread to Nora's world and breed as much as they pleased.

While Ilissa and Raclin travel back to their realm to prepare, Dorneng Hul loses patience and tries to sacrifice Nora himself. Nora surprises him with a fire spell and then accidentally breaks open a bottle in Dorneng Hul's fur cloak, releasing part of an ice demon that consumes Dorneng Hul's life spirit, though the magician's body remains intact. Nora takes the other bottles from Dorneng Hul's cloak that contain the rest of the ice demon's body and promises to give it back the rest of its body if it guides her to Maarikok, the place where some Faitoren hold Aruendiel prisoner. They journey to Maarikok, and a young man named Perin Pirekenies joins them. Once at Maarikok, Nora releases Aruendiel from a spell that is depriving him of all his magic. As soon as Aruendiel recovers (and kills the ice demon, which was about to eat Nora), they go into battle against the Faitoren and are victorious. However, Ilissa and Raclin escape, and Hirizjahkinis appears to die in battle, though her body is not found.

After having defeated the Faitoren, Aruendiel rediscovers the hole between worlds and finds that it still functions. Nora chooses to go home, and Aruendiel and an older wizard named Nansis Abora take her to the portal, and she rejoins her own world. Nora stays at her father's house but, finding that she cannot perform any magic in her own world, considers finding a new gateway back to Aruendiel's world.

== Characters ==
Nora Fisher – an English teacher from New Jersey. Twenty-nine years old when the story begins. Corresponds roughly to Elizabeth Bennet in Pride and Prejudice.

Lord Aruendiel – a magician, the third son of Lord Aruen. Died once in battle with the Faitoren, and was revived by other magicians. Bad-tempered and walks with a limp. Approximately one hundred and eighty years old (magicians age more slowly than other people). Corresponds roughly to Fitzwilliam Darcy in Pride and Prejudice.

Mrs. Toristel – an old woman who cooks and cleans for Aruendiel. Turns out to be Aruendiel's great-great-granddaughter.

Perin Pirekenies – the captain of the King's guard in Uland. Son of the illegitimate child born by Aruendiel's wife when she had an affair with another man. Eventually proposes to Nora, but she rejects him. Corresponds roughly to George Wickham in Pride and Prejudice.

Ilissa – ruler of the Faitoren. Expert at illusions and disguises. Mother-in-law of Nora.

Hirizjahkinis – female wizard who studied with Aruendiel after he rescued her from being executed. Keeps a demon servant called a Kavareen of which Aruendiel disapproves.

== Development ==
Emily Croy Barker wrote,

The original inspiration was, frankly, a daydream I had about a woman who is enchanted--partly because she doesn't believe in magic and doesn't know what's happening to her...and then almost immediately I imagined a second character, a strange, wild-haired figure, telling her that she has to snap out of this enchanted dream. And I could tell that he was a magician...and when I started wondering why he was trying to help her, I realized that both of these figures had stories to tell. So I started writing!

She also wrote, "I didn't travel specifically to do research, but I found my imagination was stimulated by trips to Maine and to France...where a couple of my friends were living in a small village in Brittany, about five miles away from a castle that in my mind became Aruendiel's castle, or close to it." When asked about Nora's character, Barker explained, "She's not based on any particular person, but she does remind me of myself and some of my friends when we were in our 20s and weren't quite sure we were on the right path in terms of the careers that we'd chosen."

Nora Fisher dislikes the novel Pride and Prejudice; however, Barker has stated "I have to disagree with my character there. I'm a huge fan and have reread it more than once." She chose that novel because "it reflects the emotional situation between Nora and Aruendiel without mirroring it exactly... I considered Jane Eyre for the same reason but its plot seemed too close to mine in some ways."

== Reception ==
Genevieve Valentine of NPR considered Nora "remarkably clueless" for a scholar, and claimed that "Barker's prose style lacks much punch or insight," but still praised the novel as "solidly-plotted."

Jeffrey Wendler, of the Newark Examiner, wrote, "There may have been a good novel lurking here, but it was just too long and slow to come out and the author has another agenda. Barker wants to expose the unjust way women are treated in medieval times."

Barbara Steinhauser of the Denver Examiner criticized the novel's implication that Nora's intelligence distinguished the novel from others of the same genre: "I also find myself flushing at the claim that this book somehow offers an alternative to other magical novels with female protagonists, in that Nora is intelligent. I have yet to read a magical novel featuring a dumb female protagonist." Nonetheless, she admitted that "Barker's novel draws its readers in...I find myself awaiting Emily Croy Barker's next release."

The novel was a finalist for the Locus Award for Best First Novel.
