= A Deadly Education =

2020 fantasy novel by Naomi Novik

- First edition
- Author: Naomi Novik
- Language: English
- Series: The Scholomance
- Genre: Fantasy novel
- Publisher: Del Rey
- Publication date: September 29, 2020
- Publication place: United States
- Media type: Print (hardcover and paperback), audiobook, e-book
- Pages: 336
- ISBN: 978-0593128480
- Followed by: The Last Graduate

A Deadly Education is a 2020 fantasy novel written by North American author Naomi Novik following Galadriel "El" Higgins, a half-Welsh, half-Indian sorceress, who must survive to graduation while controlling her destructive abilities at a school of magic very loosely inspired by the legend of the Scholomance. It was published by Del Rey on September 29, 2020 and is the first book of The Scholomance Trilogy. Its sequel, The Last Graduate, was released on September 28, 2021, and the final volume in the trilogy, The Golden Enclaves, was published in September 2022.

== Setting ==
Describing the legend of the Scholomance, which inspired the school in the book, Novik stated that it "paints a truly horrible place...[spending] years locked up in the dark, with answers to your lessons appearing in letters of flame, with no teachers, no contact with the outside world. It’s a horrible idea." She also described the school in her book as being similar to a variant on Hogwarts that attempts to "take the glaring flaws in school safety at Hogwarts a little too seriously."

In Novik's fictional universe, magic is real, but "mundanes" are largely unable to perceive it. Due to their mana, the magical energy that all sorcerers create and use, magic-wielders are constantly in danger from mana-eating monsters called maleficaria. Maleficaria, or "mals", are particularly attracted to young sorcerers just after puberty, and ninety-five percent of magic children do not survive to adulthood. Elite communities of wizards live in structures known as enclaves, which are far easier to defend from mals, but these are difficult to build and access to them is jealously guarded, creating a deep class divide. However, even the children of enclavers are at significant risk during adolescence.

The Scholomance was built as a haven where wizard children can learn magic in a safer environment until they are able to defend themselves. The school was constructed in the Void, a space outside of reality, and as such has a number of strange properties, even bordering on sentience. It is connected to the physical world at only one point, the graduation gates. Students are magically transported into the Scholomance at age fourteen and have no contact with the outside world until graduation day four years later, when they exit the school via the gates. There are no adults; students are provided with a curriculum, materials, and assignments by the school itself.

The safety of the Scholomance is relative. Its magical wards and mechanics can keep out most maleficaria, but not all, and half of all students are killed before graduation. Half of the remainder perish during graduation itself, when they must run from the school proper to the gates, through an unwarded hall where hundreds of mals congregate. Most of a student's tenure at the school is spent learning spells, building mana, and creating alliances in order to make it through the run alive.

== Plot ==
El is a student in her junior year. In flashbacks, she reveals that her father sacrificed himself during graduation so that her mother Gwen, then pregnant, could escape. However, Gwen and El were rejected by her father's family when El's great-great-grandmother, a famous seer, prophesied that El would become a powerful maleficer who would destroy enclaves. Gwen refused to believe this would happen, and raised El to never use malia, the magic that is drawn from unwilling living beings. Although Gwen is a powerful healer and would be welcome in almost any enclave, she has declined to join one; El has therefore resolved to win a place herself while at school.

El struggles with her schoolwork, as much of what the school provides for her to learn is black magic suitable for violence and destruction, apparently confirming the prophecy. In addition, most people seem to instinctively dislike and avoid her, and she has difficulty making friends. She comes to the attention of Orion Lake, a boy from the New York enclave who is both extremely popular because of his proclivity for saving his fellow students from attacks, and unusual due to his ability to take mana from killing mals. Orion initially suspects El of being a maleficer who murdered one of their classmates; however, because of his close observation of her, he is able to intervene and kill the actual murderer when El is attacked, and he and El develop a somewhat antagonistic friendship. Once the two begin spending time together, other students become far more warmly disposed to El. Wary of those students' motives, El takes care to remain friendly with the few people who showed her any kindness beforehand and shares her new advantages with them. In this way, she becomes closer with her classmates Aadhya and Liu.

One day, while El is studying with Orion in the library, students in the reading room are attacked by several mals at once, and Orion rushes to save them. El follows more cautiously and spots a maw-mouth leaving the library, heading towards the freshman dorms. A maw-mouth is an unusually dangerous mal which does not kill its victims, but keeps them alive and eternally suffering inside itself - a fate which El has particular reason to fear, since her father was eaten by one at graduation. Moreover, they are virtually impossible to destroy, even with an entire circle of wizards, but El suspects that her extraordinary aptitude for destruction might make her capable of it individually. Although killing the mals in the reading room would give her the opportunity to show off her talents and prove that she would be an asset to an enclave, El chooses to destroy the maw-mouth and save the freshmen, despite the danger and the lack of witnesses. She realizes that she is disgusted by the system of privilege that enclavers enjoy at the expense of independent wizards' lives, and will not join an enclave after graduation. As such, it is safer for her to conceal her powers lest she be seen as a threat. She tells only Aadhya and Liu, and the three of them form a graduation alliance for the following year.

In the weeks leading up to graduation, El and her companions begin to find damages to the school, and determine that Orion is the cause. By saving so many students, he has disrupted the mals’ food chain, causing those remaining to be hungrier and more desperate. Accordingly, the senior class believe they will be facing an unusually difficult graduation and threaten to breach the school’s defenses entirely, loosing the maleficaria to feast on the more vulnerable younger students and allowing the seniors to escape more easily. El and her friends instead propose that on graduation day, a team of artificer students should repair the long-defunct machinery installed to cleanse the hall every year, an endeavour previously believed too dangerous to be worth attempting. El and Orion descend with the team and fight off the attacking mals, allowing the artificers to work. Once the senior students say the machinery is repaired, they run for the gates and El and Orion return to the school, with no way of knowing whether the plan worked.

That afternoon during induction, an incoming freshman brings El a note from her mother, telling her that she must stay away from Orion.

== Reception ==
John Young of the Pittsburgh Post-Gazette acclaimed the "clear, nuanced and believable world" and the way that the story "blends some real-world situations with life in the Scholomance." Writing for Locus, Adrienne Martini says, "Novik's light touch, dark whimsy, and sense of humor make it hard to put down." Publishers Weekly called it a "must-read for fantasy fans."

Kirkus Reviews responded less positively, saying the book "falls short of its potential" and that "El's bad attitude and her incessant info-dumping make Novik's protagonist hard to like".

A Deadly Education was a 2021 finalist for the Lodestar Award for Best Young Adult Book. (Note: In spite of not being marketed as a young adult book.) The Scholomance trilogy has been optioned by Universal Pictures for a film adaptation.

== Diversity-related criticism ==
Mahvesh Murad of Tor.com called the novel's diversity "forced," saying "For many POC readers (particularly desi readers, myself included), there will be some discomfort at reading about El’s familial background, and why she isn’t in touch with her father’s family."

A passage in the novel where the main character describes dreadlocks as being susceptible to infestation by bug-like magical creatures was criticized as perpetrating negative stereotypes about Black hair. The Mary Sue said that "to see a fantasy novel that describes a Black hair style in such a callous...manner is very disappointing and certainly does not speak to the...representation that deserves to be seen." Novik issued a public apology promising to cut the "dreadlocks" passage from future editions.

Further diversity-related issues were raised concerning the book, while others defended Novik, for example calling it "unfair to say that El’s lack of connection to her Indian relations is a sign of Novik’s laziness and unwillingness to portray an authentically Asian character".
