= Uprooted (novel) =

Novel by Naomi Novik

- Author: Naomi Novik
- Cover artist: Scott McKowen
- Language: English
- Series: Stand-alone
- Genre: Fantasy
- Set in: The Middle Ages, in a land reminiscent of Poland
- Published: 2015
- Publisher: Del Rey
- Publication place: United States
- Media type: Print (hardcover)
- Pages: 448 pp
- Awards: 2015 Nebula Award; 2016 British Fantasy Award; 2016 Locus Award; 2016 Mythopoeic Award
- ISBN: 978-0804179034

Uprooted is a 2015 high fantasy novel by Naomi Novik, based on Polish folklore. The story tells of a village girl, Agnieszka, who is selected by the local wizard for her unseen magical powers. Together they battle the Wood, a nearby forest, as it seeks to take over the land. The book was warmly welcomed by critics and other fantasy authors, who praised the portrayals of both Agnieszka and the Wood.

It won the 2015 Nebula Award for Best Novel, the 2016 Locus Award for Best Fantasy Novel, and the 2016 Mythopoeic Award in the category Adult Literature. It was a finalist for the 2016 Hugo Award for Best Novel.

== Plot ==
Agnieszka lives in the village of Dvernik in the kingdom of Polnya. Every ten years the local wizard ("the Dragon") collects one teenage girl as payment for protecting the local valley from the magical forest (the Wood) that borders it. Agnieszka is clumsy and slovenly; her beautiful friend Kasia has been groomed to be selected. Nevertheless, the Dragon chooses Agnieszka, who is taken to his tower. The Dragon reveals that he chose Agnieszka for her latent magical abilities, and he starts teaching her simple spells. Agnieszka finds these acts of magic difficult and unnatural.

When the Dragon leaves to deal with a Chimera, Agnieszka's village is attacked. Agnieszka escapes from the tower and returns to Dvernik. Wolves from the Wood have infected local cattle. She successfully uses magic to help destroy the cattle, but the wolves return and attack her and Kasia. The Dragon arrives and saves them, but is wounded. Agnieszka saves his life by using a spell from the notebook of the witch Jaga's notebooks. The Dragon had disagreed with Jaga's magical practices, believing them to be useless. Recognizing that Agneieszka's powers differ from his, he reluctantly allows Agnieszka to teach herself Jaga's more intuitive magic.

Kasia is captured by creatures from the Wood. Knowing that no one returns from the Wood alive, the Dragon writes her off as dead. Agnieszka uses her magic to locate Kasia, half-entombed in a tree that is consuming her, and rescues her. However, the Wood has corrupted Kasia, and the Dragon tells Agnieszka that her friend must be killed. He agrees to put off the execution so that Agniezka can research a cure. When Agnieszka and the Dragon combine their powers, they manage to free Kasia from the Wood's hold.

'Since you doubt me, take your men with you and go inside', the Dragon hissed back 'See for yourself'.
'I will', Prince Marek said. 'And I'll take this witch-girl of yours, and your lovely peasant [Kasia] too.'
'You'll take no one who doesn't wish to go', the Dragon said. 'Since you were a child, you've imagined yourself a hero out of legend—'
'Better than a deliberate coward', the prince said, grinning at him with all his teeth, violence like a living thing in the room taking shape between them, and before the Dragon could answer, I blurted out 'What if we could weaken the Wood before we went in?' and they broke their locked gaze and looked at me, startled, where I stood.
— Uprooted, chapter 13

News of Kasia's purification brings Prince Marek and his wizard, the Falcon, to the Dragon's tower. Once they realize that Kasia is no longer under the Wood's spell, they order the Dragon to retrieve the Prince's mother, who ran away twenty years earlier. They and thirty soldiers go into the Wood. Magical creatures slaughter the troops, but the party frees the comatose Queen. The Dragon wants to destroy the weakened Wood once and for all, but the Prince takes his mother and Kasia back to court to prove they are free of the Wood's corruption. Agnieszka goes with them to testify. She gains certification as a witch, but things quickly go awry.

The Queen blames Rosya, a rival nation, for her imprisonment. The King is killed by a magical creature. The Queen manipulates her oldest son into going to war against Rosya, where he is killed. Agnieszka and Kasia rescue the prince's children and flee to the Dragon's tower. The Queen, Marek, and the Falcon arrive at the tower. Agnieszka sees a vision that the Queen is possessed by a spirit called the Wood Queen.

Agnieszka convinces the Dragon to help her to defeat the forest once and for all. Agnieszka has a vision of the past, learning that the Wood Queen was part of a magical people who lived in the forest. The Wood Queen married a human king. After the king's death, his citizens turned on the wood people. They transformed into trees to protect themselves. The Wood Queen returned to her people only to find that they had become trees. The Wood Queen became distraught with grief and hatred. She began sealing human beings into heart-trees in an effort to preserve what was left of her people. Agnieszka helps the Wood Queen change into a tree.

The Dragon doubts this will keep the forest in check. He goes to the Polnya court to help free it of the corruption that has taken root there. Agnieszka suspects he is running from his feelings for her. A year later, Agnieszka and various forest creatures work to maintain the Wood. They burn corrupted trees and regularly replace them with new, good trees. At the local harvest, the Dragon returns to collect his taxes: Agnieszka knows he has returned for her.

== Publication history ==
Uprooted was published in 2015 by Del Rey Books in New York, and by Pan Books in London. It has been translated into at least nine languages. A limited edition of 750 copies, with illustrations by Donato Giancola, was published by Grim Oak Press of Seattle in 2018. The edition contains 33 full-page monochrome plates, for a frontispiece and one illustration in each chapter.

== Scholarly and critical reception ==
=== Origins ===
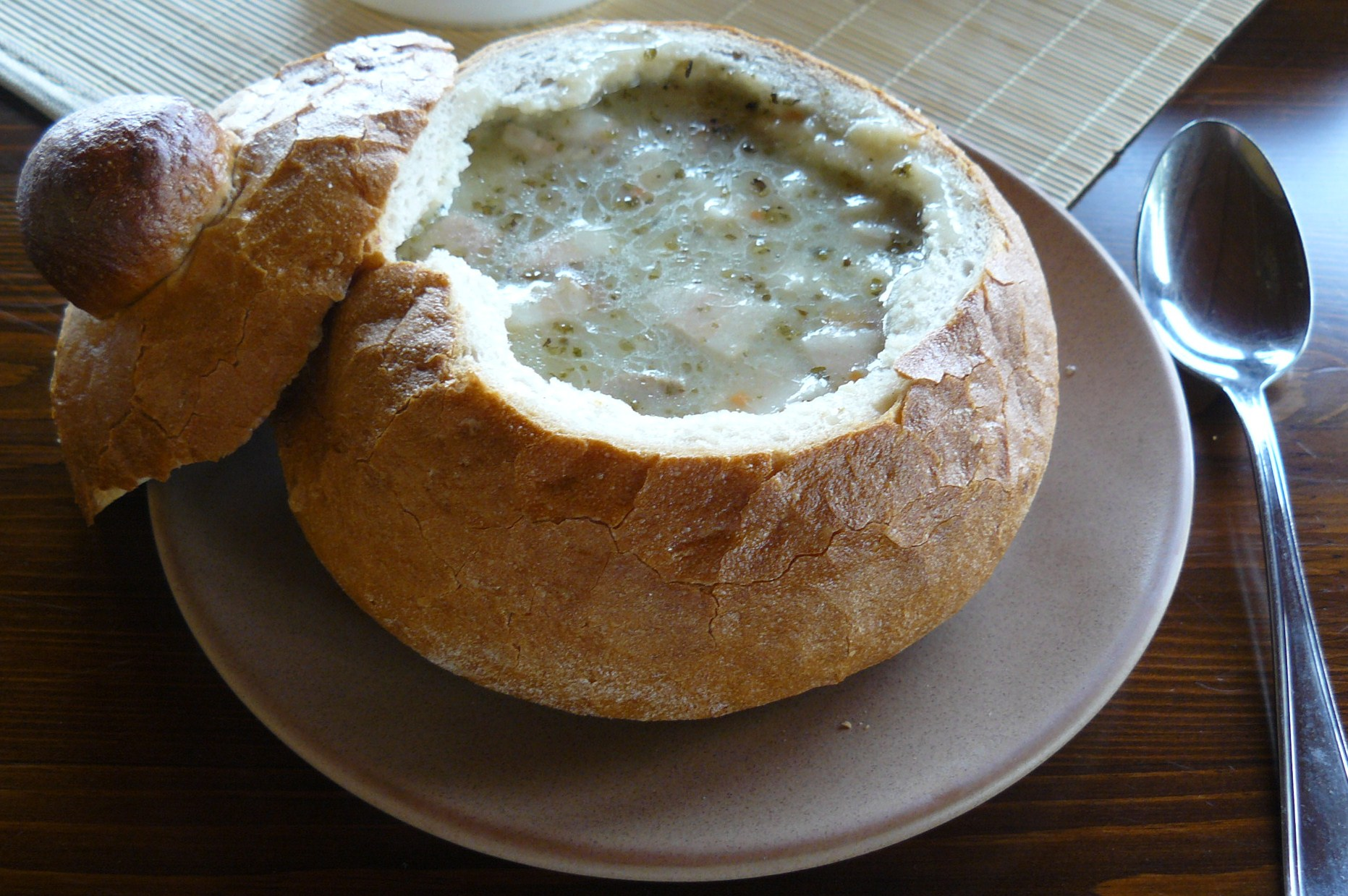
Agnieszka tastes Polish-style zhurek, sour rye soup, served here in a bread bowl, in the final feast.

Uprooted is influenced by Polish folklore: Novik was brought up on Polish fairytales. The protagonist's name references a story, Agnieszka Skrawek Nieba (Agnieszka Piece of Sky) by the Polish children's author and translator Natalia Gałczyńska; Novik specially liked the story as a child. Baba Jaga is a common bogeyman in Slavic folklore, including in the Polish stories that Novik used to hear at bedtime. The "birthday song about living a hundred years", to whose melody Agnieszka chants the spell which cures the Dragon of corruption, is the Polish birthday song Sto lat, meaning literally "[May you live] one hundred years". The lyrics of another song quoted in the book, "about the spark on the hearth, telling its long stories", are a translation of a part of the Polish bedtime song Bajka iskierki (or, Z popielnika na Wojtusia) by Janina Porazińska. At the final feast, Agnieszka tastes zhurek, a phonetic spelling of an Eastern European sour rye soup known in Poland as żur or żurek.

=== Critical reception ===
The author Amal El-Mohtar, reviewing the "sword-and-sorcery fantasy novel" for NPR, described it as "moving, heartbreaking, and thoroughly satisfying". She comments that the book contains enough plot for at least three books, but manages never to feel rushed; she finds it "grounded and meticulous in its exploration of character and setting." In her view Uprooted is "a triumph on several fronts", including its pace, setting, escalating tension, and especially the strong friendship between the "uncouth, coltish" Agnieszka and her opposite, the "gorgeous, skillful, brave" Kasia. The result is a "perfectly immersive" read that takes "classic fantasy stances", like the irritable male wizard in his tower, and somehow creates a fresh and vibrant text from these ingredients.

Mac Rogers, in Slate, writes that Novik skilfully provides readers with "several modes of wish-fulfillment" through the book, including giving the protagonist Agnieska "the full Harry Potter/Katniss Everdeen experience", at once followed by a "Belle/Jane Eyre" setup in the "Dragon's" tower. Like El-Mohtar, Rogers remarks that the book contains material for a whole trilogy, wishing that Novik had given Agnieszka the chance "to explore a few blind-alley identities" on the way to becoming a "latter-day Baba Yaga".

Kate Nepveu, on Tor.com, writes that a reader of the first three chapters might expect the book to be a "Beauty and the Beast" tale, or a story of "intrinsically-gendered magic". Instead, it is "a kingdom-level fantasy with great magic and an engaging narrator—which packs a surprising amount of plot into its single volume." She finds the wood a "wonderful" antagonist, commenting that the book describes "a series of increasingly-intense magical struggles as the Wood’s corrupting influence escalates and diversifies." The effect is in her view exciting and suspenseful. She considers the use of standard fairy-tale elements like woods, wolves, princes, and lost queens both modern and cohesive, creating an "emotionally satisfying" novel.

Catherine Mann, for the British Fantasy Society, calls Uprooted "an inventive and very enjoyable book" which speedily immerses the reader in its world. In her view, the story starts simply but grows steadily more complex, more imaginative, and more suspenseful. Mann likens the account of Agnieszka's "instinctive magic", very different from the codified approach of the court wizards, to that described by Diana Wynne Jones, calling this "a high compliment."

Kallam Clay, in The Mercury News, writes that unlike her 8-volume Temeraire alternate history series, Uprooted is a traditional fantasy. He finds Agnieszka "a wonderful protagonist, far from perfect but tough and charming", describing Novik's handling of Agnieszka's voice as "pitch-perfect", so that her decisions emerge naturally from her character.

Genevieve Valentine, reviewing the book in The New York Times, writes that the coming-of-age tale is a "messier" story, deeper than the "bright, forthright" and somewhat mythic teenage books that it might call to mind. In her view, Novik "skillfully takes the fairy-tale-turned-bildungsroman structure of her premise" and develops it into "a very enjoyable fantasy with the air of a modern classic."

== Awards ==
Uprooted won the Nebula Award for Best Novel, the 2016 Locus Award for Best Fantasy Novel, and the 2016 Mythopoeic Award in the category Adult Literature. It was also a finalist for the 2016 Hugo Award for Best Novel.

Year	Award	Category	Result	Ref.
2015	Nebula Award	Novel	Won	
2016	British Fantasy Award	Fantasy Novel	Won	
2016	Hugo Award	Novel	Shortlisted	
2016	Locus Award	Fantasy Novel	Won	
2016	Mythopoeic Award	Adult Literature	Won	
2016	World Fantasy Award	Novel	Shortlisted	

== Adapted work ==
In 2015, Warner Bros. purchased the rights to make a movie adaptation of Uprooted and assigned Ellen DeGeneres to produce it.

== Sources ==
- Novik, Naomi (2015). Uprooted. New York: Del Rey Books. ISBN 978-0-8041-7903-4. OCLC 892304621.
