= League of Dragons =

2016 novel by Naomi Novik

- First edition cover
- Author: Naomi Novik
- Cover artist: Craig D. Howell (Del Rey hardback above); Dominic Harman (Voyager trade paperback)
- Language: English
- Series: Temeraire
- Genres: Alternate history; fantasy
- Publisher: Del Rey (US); Voyager (UK)
- Publication date: June 14, 2016 (US); June 16, 2016 (UK)
- Publication place: United States
- Pages: 400
- ISBN: 978-0345522924
- Preceded by: Blood of Tyrants

League of Dragons is the ninth and final novel in the Temeraire alternate history/fantasy series by American author Naomi Novik. It was released by Del Rey Books on June 14, 2016.

== Plot ==
League of Dragons is the ninth and final book in the Temeraire series, an alternate history of the Napoleonic Wars in which the British have an air force composed of dragons and pilots. Captain William Laurence hatches a mysterious egg that houses a Chinese dragon, Temeraire, who becomes Laurence’s companion. In League of Dragons, Napoleon has been defeated in Russia but is planning a new offensive. He has promised downtrodden dragons all around the world equal rights and privileges if they join his side. It’s up to Laurence and Temeraire to stop him and his underhanded schemes once and for all.

The novel opens with Napoleon’s retreat from Russia in the middle of a harsh winter. Coalition forces attempt to capture him, but he successfully makes it back to Paris to collect himself and hatch a new plan. Laurence and Temeraire are in Lithuania. Laurence, who had become estranged from his family in a previous book, learns his father has died. He is grieving for his father and filled with regret that they were not able to reconcile. When they reach Russia, he and Temeraire become entangled in local politics as they try to gain better conditions for Russian dragons. Temeraire is also leading a search for a group of missing Prussian dragons.

Laurence gets into trouble when he strikes Dobrozhnov, a drunken Russian man, who wishes aloud that all the dragons had died in the plague. In his depression, Laurence lets his temper get the better of him, and an angry Dobrozhnov challenges him to a duel. When they meet for the duel, Dobrozhnov fires early, wounding Laurence. Laurence’s second wounds Dobrozhnov, in turn. Meanwhile, feral dragons tell Temeraire that the missing Prussians have been seen in France.

A Prussian dragon, Eroica, arrives to warn Temeraire that Lien, an albino Chinese dragon allied with Napoleon, has vowed to destroy the egg Temeraire’s mate, Iskierka laid. She has sworn revenge on Temeraire ever since the death of her human companion. Fearful for his unborn hatchling, Temeraire leaves for China alone, without waiting for Laurence to recover. He is soon attacked by villagers and rescued by Tharkay, a human guide, who tells him his egg is being transported to France.

Temeraire, Laurence, Tharkay, Iskierka, and Granby head toward France in search of the egg, but they are captured in the Alps. They discover the French are busy incubating thousands of dragon eggs. Meeting with Napoleon at Fontainebleau, they learn his new strategy: he wants the dragons of the world on his side. He has offered them a cure for the dragon plague, and a Concord granting them the rights and privileges that some countries, such as Britain and North America, have denied them. Dragons are eager to be recognized as sentient, intelligent beings, not merely beasts of burden; Napoleon is shrewdly using this to his advantage.

Temeraire and Iskierka’s egg hatches, and their daughter Ning is born. She proves particularly powerful, able to breathe both fire and “divine wind” (a trait unique to Chinese Celestial dragons like Temeraire) immediately upon hatching.

In England, Laurence is appointed an Admiral and reconnects with his long-estranged love, Jane Roland, after many months and continents apart. Laurence has always displayed careful control over his emotions, but he is finally able to display them, and the two spend a passionate night together. Both Jane and her daughter, Emily, have served in the Aerial Force.

Temeraire learns of Napoleon’s Concord but doesn’t tell Laurence for the moment, aware that his companion is enjoying a rare moment of happiness. He meets with other dragons to draft the Dragon Rights Act of 1813. Ning assists, showing her cunning nature. Laurence is given command over a new set of aviators and begins to train them. They depart for the Continent.

Laurence fights the Battle of Berlin, and is victorious, although several of his captains deliberately delay following his orders. After the battle, Laurence awards prizes to the dragons as motivation. A Jade Dragon delivers bad news: Napoleon is now attacking Dresden. They join the fight but must retreat. Captain Poole attempts to keep fighting, but the dragons ensure that Laurence’s forces retreat as ordered.

Help from China is delayed; Napoleon’s Concord is working – the dragons are uncooperative. A Coalition officer proposes poisoning all dragons in response. Laurence, though he has always been loyal, resolves he will join Napoleon if such a plan is carried out. The Coalition agrees to Temeraire’s Dragon Rights Act, refusing the poisoning plan and recognizing that dragons have fundamental rights.

Finally, Napoleon is captured with help from Tswana dragons from Africa, who fear a man like Napoleon running the world. He is forced to abdicate and is exiled to St. Helena along with Lien. Laurence realizes that Napoleon lost because his wife, Anahuarque, leader of the Incan Empire, betrayed him.

Laurence becomes a baronet and Jane is made a duchess. Now that the world is at peace, Laurence retires, and Temeraire gets a seat in Parliament.

== Reception ==
Reviewing the novel for NPR, writer Jason Heller stated: "League of Dragons masterfully wraps up so many plot threads and loose ends that had built up throughout the previous eight books". Publishers Weekly agreed, describing League of Dragons as a novel "packed with action and excitement, drawing the series to a delightful and satisfying close ..." Kirkus Reviews was less enthusiastic in their review, stating: "Not the finest entry in the sequence, being slow to gather momentum and somewhat patchy, but overall a satisfying conclusion to a remarkable series."

The book also received reviews in other venues:

- Review by Nagaliga
- Review by Carolyn Cushman (2016) in Locus, #669 October 2016
- Review by Paul Di Filippo (2017) in Asimov's Science Fiction, January-February 2017
