= The Scholomance Trilogy =

Novel series by Naomi Novik

- A Deadly Education (2020); The Last Graduate (2021); The Golden Enclaves (2022)
- Author: Naomi Novik
- Country: United States
- Language: English
- Genre: Young adult; Fantasy
- Publisher: Del Rey Books (US)
- Published: September 29, 2020 – September 27, 2022
- Media type: Print (hardback & paperback); Audiobook; E-book
- No. of books: 3

The Scholomance Trilogy is a series of three fantasy novels written by American author Naomi Novik. The books follow the adventures of Galadriel "El" Higgins during and after attending a dangerous and magical boarding school for wizards named after the magic school Scholomance from Romanian folklore.

== Setting ==
In Novik's fictional universe, magic is real, but "mundanes" are largely unable to perceive it. Due to the magical energy that all sorcerers create and use ("mana"), magic-wielders are constantly in danger from mana-eating monsters called maleficaria. Maleficaria, or "mals", are particularly attracted to young sorcerers just after puberty, and ninety-five percent of magic children do not survive to adulthood. Elite communities of wizards live in structures known as enclaves, which are far easier to defend from mals, but these are difficult to build and access to them is jealously guarded, creating a deep class divide.

Even the children of enclavers, however, are at significant risk during adolescence. Accordingly, wealthy wizard enclaves collaborated to build Novik's "Scholomance" as a haven where wizard children can learn magic in a safer environment until they are able to defend themselves.

Having been constructed in the Void, a space outside of reality, the school has a number of strange properties, even bordering on sentience. It is connected to the physical world at only one point, the graduation gates. Fourteen-year-old students are magically transported into the Scholomance on a specific day each year and have no contact with the outside world until graduation day four years later, when they exit the school via the gates. There are no adults; students are provided with a curriculum, materials, and assignments by the school itself.

The safety of the Scholomance is relative. Its magical wards and mechanics can keep out most maleficaria, but not all, and half of all students are killed before graduation. Half of the remainder perish during graduation itself, when they must run from the school proper to the gates, through an unwarded hall where hundreds of mals congregate. Most of a student's tenure at the school is spent learning spells, building mana, and creating alliances in order to make it through the run alive.

Describing the legend of the Scholomance, which inspired the school in the book, Novik stated that it "paints a truly horrible place...[spending] years locked up in the dark, with answers to your lessons appearing in letters of flame, with no teachers, no contact with the outside world. It’s a horrible idea." She also described the school in her book as being similar to a variant on Hogwarts that attempts to "take the glaring flaws in school safety at Hogwarts a little too seriously."

== Potential film adaptation ==
In 2020, Deadline Hollywood announced that Universal Studios had bought film rights to the three books of the series, putting the first book into development with Mandeville Films According to Syfy, Meera Menon will direct a film based on the first novel, but no release date has been set.

== Novels ==
- A Deadly Education (2020)
- The Last Graduate (2021)
- The Golden Enclaves (2022)
