= Victory of Eagles =

Novel by Naomi Novik

- Hardback cover
- Author: Naomi Novik
- Cover artist: Craig D. Howell (Del Rey hardback above); Andrew Davidson (Voyager hardback); Dominic Harman (Voyager e-book)
- Language: English
- Series: Temeraire
- Genres: Alternate history; fantasy
- Publisher: Del Rey (US); Voyager (UK)
- Publication date: July 8, 2008 (US); August 7, 2008 (UK)
- Publication place: United States
- Media type: Print (hardcover)
- Pages: 352
- ISBN: 978-0345496881
- Preceded by: Empire of Ivory
- Followed by: Tongues of Serpents

Victory of Eagles is the fifth novel in the Temeraire alternate history/fantasy series by American author Naomi Novik. The series follows the actions of William Laurence and his dragon, Temeraire.

The book was released in hardcover in North America and the United Kingdom by Voyager Books on July 8, 2008.

== Plot details ==
As the novel begins, William Laurence is gaoled aboard HMS Goliath, imprisoned against Temeraire's good behavior. Whilst aboardship, he joins the crew in fighting off the Grande Armée, who supported by the Armée d'Air are attempting to invade Great Britain. They succeed, and Laurence is reported to have been killed in action when Goliath is sunk. Temeraire, languishing at the breeding grounds at Pen y Fan, receives this intelligence and loses any desire to remain quiet and well-behaved. Instead, fired partially by patriotism and partially by vengeance, he organizes the many unharnessed dragons of the breeding ground into a militia, using promises of prizes as an enticement. Enlisting the breeding grounds' (human) supervisory staff as logistical support, he and the other dragons strike south to do what they can against Napoleon Bonaparte. This, of course, results in a merry chase: Laurence, who did not perish aboard Goliath, is mustered by Tharkay, now commissioned in the Aerial Corps, to bring Temeraire back under harness, and he arrives at Pen y Fan perhaps half a day after the dragons move out. The two are reunited outside of Harlesden, where Temeraire has already staged and won a decisive victory against a group of Marshal Lefebvre; in fact, Laurence is intercepted by a courier who is seeking out the commander of the militia (that is, Temeraire) with a colonel's commission.

Laurence, Temeraire, and Temeraire's militia, almost instantly supplemented by Iskierka and her flock of Turkish ferals, regroup with the British Army at Harpenden, accepting his commission. General Arthur Wellesley, more freewheeling than most of the British high command, accepts the idea of Temeraire as an officer in his own right, treating Temeraire thereafter with all the rights and responsibilities of any colonel (including chewing him out when his command goes wrong, which to Temeraire's credit he takes to heart). Sir Hew Dalrymple Ross commands the defense of London, though Wellesley dismisses the effort as a lost cause, now that Horatio Nelson and his twenty ships have been sent to Copenhagen. Regardless, the effort is made, augmented by tactics created by Temeraire and Perscitia, a violence-abhorring but very clever dragon who (amongst other things) has been entrusted to operate the militia's artillery. Both sides involve about thirty thousand men, but this leaves the question of where Marshal Davout has got to; after the battle is joined, he is discovered outflanking the British with an additional twenty thousand. Only a brilliant action by Wellesley allows the British to escape.

While helping the British Army in its withdrawal, Laurence and Temeraire speak with Wellesley about their notions of draconian equality. Laurence describes his own experiences abroad, visiting societies where dragons are treated as equal members instead of being harnessed and controlled by humans as British dragons are, societies that are materially enriched by this approach; and Admiral Jane Roland submits her theory that Napoleon has bolstered his own aerial corps by extending similar privileges to the ferals of the Continent. Wellesley agrees to open coverts to general use, and that the dragons might be paid directly the cost of their upkeep (around 400 pounds) to spend as they will. He also steals a page from Napoleon's book by using dragons as mass transportation for his soldiers; the dragons must leap-frog an hour back and forth, but a regiment can now move an extra twenty miles a day. Finally, Laurence and Tharkay must handle a distraction when Iskierka, impatient with the retreat, hares off into the arms of the French and becomes captured; the two sneak into London to exfiltrate her and Granby. This is an especially painful exercise for Laurence, as during the escapade he is detained by Bertram Woolvey, a man known to him from childhood, and his wife Edith Galman, with whom Laurence had once shared a serious but unofficial betrothal. Woolvey, for reasons he chooses not to share, helps them sneak into Kensington Palace and is slain during the escape.

After regrouping at the Aerial Corps training grounds at Loch Laggan, Scotland, Wellesley and the British high command try to decide on their strategy, including the question of how best to safeguard King George III, who is not well. Roland announces that she and Adm. Collingwood have jointly repulsed another landing at Folkestone and sealed the English Channel against further incursion, stranding Napoleon on the British Isle. Wellesley promises victory and is given command. He then details Laurence, Temeraire, Iskierka and eight talon-picked dragons (mostly of Temeraire's former formation) into the English countryside, there to attack French foraging parties with the intent of starving out the Grande Armée, particularly the ever-hungry dragons, and reducing Napoleon's zone of control. Laurence's orders specify that no pitched battles are allowed, and no quarter is to be given, despite the British guerrillas having clear superiority in military strength; Laurence, understanding, demands that the rest of the formation receive written orders that they follow Laurence's commands without specifying what those commands may be, thus protecting the formation from culpability in war crimes. The mission is instrumental in accustoming the citizens of Britain to the presence of dragons, who are now defending them against the depredations of French foraging parties; despite the larger size of these resistance fighters, the British countryside becomes as protective of them as any other. Despite this, however, Laurence eventually decides to disobey orders and communicates this to Wellesley.

Fortunately, Wellesley has judged the time ripe for battle and misconstrues Laurence's reply as an attempt to pass responsibility back up the chain of command. The British Army is deployed out to the southern bank of the mouth of the Thames, a questionable position which Wellesley knows Napoleon will not be able to resist. He commands the Coldstream Guards and Scots Greys to hold the center, whilst other elements support and, when the time is right, encircle Napoleon's forces. On the day of battle, the field is shrouded in mist, and Bonaparte presses his advantages. He has almost seized the day when the fog finally lifts, allowing Admiral Nelson and his considerable fleet, secretly returned from Copenhagen and waiting now in the Channel, to attack the onrushing French with full broadsides whilst the artillery pins them in place. As men and dragons are pounded into the earth, Lien takes wing for the first time, and uses the divine wind to stir up a tsunami which destroys the fleet, sinking every one of the ships, and killing almost all of the men, including Nelson. This serves to buy time for Napoleon to retreat, carried by Lien, but utterly defeated.

In the aftermath of the battle, things change for the better for the British dragons: using treasure won on the field they are funding the construction of their own pavilions. Wellesley, now in his familiar title as the Duke of Wellington, commutes Laurence's sentence to Transportation to the Colony of New South Wales (Australia); he is also to bring three dragon eggs to give the colony some aerial forces. The novel ends as he and Temeraire, accompanied by the irrepressible Iskierka, who demands an egg from Temeraire, are on board the Alliegance, sailing to their new fate.

== Reception ==
The book received several reviews:

- Review by Carolyn Cushman (2008) in Locus, #569 June 2008
- Review by Ian Randal Strock (2009) in Analog Science Fiction and Fact, January-February 2009
- Review [Dutch] by Tessel M. Bauduin (2009) in Holland-SF 2009, #2

== Reviews ==
Review by Thomas M. Wagner at SF Reviews.net (archived at The Wayback Machine)
