= The Last Graduate =

2021 novel by Naomi Novik

- Author: Naomi Novik
- Language: English
- Series: The Scholomance
- Genre: Fantasy novel
- Publisher: Del Rey
- Publication date: September 28, 2021
- Publication place: United States
- Media type: Print (hardcover and paperback), audiobook, e-book
- Pages: 400 (hardcover)
- ISBN: 978-0593128862
- Preceded by: A Deadly Education
- Followed by: The Golden Enclaves

The Last Graduate is a 2021 fantasy novel written by American author Naomi Novik following Galadriel "El" Higgins, a half-Welsh, half-Indian sorceress, who must survive to graduation while controlling her destructive abilities at the fabled school of black magic, the Scholomance. It was published by Del Rey on September 28, 2021 and is the second book of The Scholomance Trilogy. The first of the series, A Deadly Education, was released on September 29, 2020.

Although written for adults, The Last Graduate won the 2022 Lodestar Award, awarded by the World Science Fiction Convention for the best young adult science fiction or fantasy book of the past year.

== Plot ==
Following the events of A Deadly Education, El and her friends begin their senior year. The student body is troubled to learn from incoming freshmen that Bangkok enclave vanished mysteriously, along with everyone inside at the time. No one has taken responsibility, but the wizard community is on high alert, and a war between enclaves may be brewing.

Meanwhile, El is faintly outraged to discover that she has been assigned a punishingly difficult courseload and, strangely, put into a homeroom with eight freshmen. On her first day with them, they are attacked by a mal in the classroom. To her own surprise, El is unwilling to abandon the younger students and kills the mal with mana she had been saving for graduation. Over the weeks that follow, El and the eight freshmen are relentlessly targeted by mal attacks which El fights off.

El finds her supplies of mana dwindling and reluctantly asks for help from Chloe Rasmussen, a girl from the New York enclave. El believes Chloe will grant her access to the New Yorkers’ pool of shared mana because of El’s nebulous involvement with Orion, who is the son of a prominent New York sorceress. Chloe obliges, but also startles El by asking to join her alliance with Aadhya and Liu - a request which Chloe would only make if she genuinely believed it would help her survive graduation. As the end of term draws nearer, El becomes close with not only Chloe, but also members of other alliances as they exchange favours and cooperate to help one another. Meanwhile, El and Orion’s mutual attraction continues to develop. Orion invites her to join him and his friends in New York enclave, but El refuses, as she has other plans.

Modern enclaves require massive amounts of mana, not only to build, but to buy the spells from established enclaves. However, during her junior year, El stumbled across a spellbook, known as the Golden Stone Sutras, that was previously believed lost. The sutras provide instructions for creating smaller but still secure spaces that can be constructed by just one wizard for much less mana, as long as that wizard is sufficiently powerful. El intends to travel the world, setting up Golden Stone enclaves; Orion agrees to go with her, provided they survive graduation.

Typically during the latter half of the school year, seniors prepare for graduation in a series of obstacle courses, created weekly in the gymnasium by the school. This year, however, the gym runs rapidly become so difficult that only El, with her arsenal of destructive spells, and Orion, who takes mana from killing mals, can get through them. El realizes that just as she could not abandon “her” freshmen, she will not be able to let any members of her year die. However, even her and Orion’s powers will not be enough; all the seniors will have to cooperate. Her classmates are eventually won over to her cause, and they all begin training together.

Just as El is convinced of this plan, she has a chance encounter with Sudarat, a girl from her homeroom group. Sudarat does not believe that she herself will survive graduation and is resigned to dying without ever seeing the outside world again. El realizes that even if she saves everyone in her graduating class, the current underclassmen - and all subsequent generations of students - will still be at risk and go on dying. She rails at the school itself, whereupon a maintenance hatch pops open on the wall of her study room. She climbs down it to the graduation hall, where she discovers that the repairs to the cleansing machinery were effective and there are no mals left there. She then has the epiphany that the Scholomance has been leading her to all year. She was meant to learn to care for people other than herself - first her allies, then her year-mates, then everyone in the school - and save them. The Scholomance was built to shelter and protect the wizard children of the world. The current system was the best it could do - until El and Orion arrived, with their unique powers.

The students determine that it would not be feasible to repair the cleansing machinery every year, so another plan is needed. Liu suggests that they “send the mals to school” - rather than make the Scholomance safer by keeping more maleficaria out, the wizards should improve conditions in the outside world by devastating the creatures’ population in a single blow. On graduation day, all the students enter the hall together. El and her friends cast a powerful luring spell, causing mals to pour into the school through the portals that open to allow students to return home. Meanwhile, Orion and the other students protect one another as they queue for their exits. Once the Scholomance is full of mals and all the other pupils have departed, El is meant to jump out of her portal and trigger a spell of enormous destruction, severing the school’s link with reality. However, when the only two left are El and Orion, the pair are attacked by an enormous maw-mouth that they cannot fight off. Orion tells El he loves her, and pushes her out of the portal.

== Reception ==
Tasha Robinson of the Polygon wrote about the books "All her novels are compelling and immersive, and they all reimagine existing history and folklore in strikingly new ways. The Scholomance books were partly inspired by a pair of Eastern European legends about a school of magic where Satan claims the soul of the last graduate to leave."

The book received mostly positive reviews. Elizabeth Tabler of the Grimdark Magazine praised the book, calling it "mind-blowing and fantastic" and that she "went clamoring for more". Lacy Baugher of the Culturess called it "one of the best fantasy series out there right now".

Kirkus Reviews points out that The Last Graduate doesn't recount what had happened in the first book of the series, and doesn't introduce the narrator, and that readers can be puzzled if they forgot this.
