= Spinning Silver =

2018 novel by Naomi Novik

- First edition (US)
- Author: Naomi Novik
- Language: English
- Series: Stand-alone
- Genre: Fantasy
- Set in: The Middle Ages, in a fictional Slavic country
- Published: 2018
- Publisher: Del Rey Books (US); Macmillan (UK)
- Publication place: United States
- Media type: Print (hardcover)
- Pages: 480
- ISBN: 978-1509899012

Spinning Silver is a 2018 fantasy novel written by Naomi Novik. Novik originally published a short story called "Spinning Silver" in the anthology The Starlit Wood in 2016 and later expanded it into a novel. Spinning Silver won the American Library Association's Alex Award in 2019, the 2019 Locus Award for Best Fantasy Novel, and the 2019 Audie Award for Fantasy. Spinning Silver was a 2019 Hugo Award for Best Novel Nominee, a 2018 finalist for the Nebula Award for Best Novel, and a 2018 Goodreads Choice Award Nominee for Fantasy. The novel is loosely based on the tale of Rumpelstiltskin.

== Plot ==
The story of Spinning Silver unfolds in the voices of several characters, but primarily in the voices of three young women who struggle against strong evil forces, in an imaginary medieval eastern European kingdom called Lithvas.

Over the last seven years, Lithvas has been suffering from long, brutal winters that are slowly killing its people. Miryem Mandelstam, a young Jewish girl, takes over her father's moneylending business to save her family from poverty. A village girl, Wanda and later her brother, become the Mandelstams' servants. One night, Miryem, flush with her financial success, brags to her mother that she can “turn silver into gold”. Her boast is overheard by the Staryk, a race of fae creatures who emerge from their own world every winter to raid human settlements, and Miryem receives three deliveries of magical silver. Realizing that the Staryk will kill her if she does not give them gold in exchange, she has the metal made into three pieces of jewellery to sell. After the sale of the second piece, Miryem demands payment for her work; to Miryem’s horror, the Staryk king tells her that after the third, her "reward" will be marriage to him.

The jewellery is bought by the duke of the city of Vysnia for his daughter, Irina; he then persuades Mirnatius, the tsar of Lithvas, to marry her. On her wedding night, Irina discovers that while wearing her Staryk jewellery, she can cross into the Staryk kingdom and magically observe her husband. Mirnatius has a contract allowing his body to be inhabited by Chernobog, a demon who drinks souls and can only emerge at night due to his hatred of sunlight. Each evening, the new tsarina escapes to the fae world, where she is safe from the demon.

After the Staryk king abducts Miryem to his palace, she learns that she can literally change silver into gold with a touch. She also discovers that the Staryk king is responsible for lengthening the winters in Lithvas, and that it is his desire to make them permanent. Although she hates her husband, who refuses even to tell her his name due to the power over him it would give her, Miryem comes to know and care for some of the Staryk; she also sees that their kingdom is suffering mysterious damages. While out exploring, Miryem encounters Irina. The two women create a plan to bring their husbands together, in the hopes that they will destroy one another. Because Miryem cannot cross to the human world alone, she bargains with the king: he will take her to attend her cousin’s wedding in Vysnia if she can transform three of his enormous vaults of silver within three days. She succeeds, barely, with the help of her servants.

Chernobog promises that, in exchange for Irina giving him the Staryk king, he will never harm her or anyone she cares about. She takes him to the wedding, where he confronts the king. With the help of the mortals, the demon imprisons the Staryk and begins consuming his magic. Mirnatius tells Irina that he did not choose the contract with Chernobog, but was promised to the demon by his own mother in exchange for her marrying his father, the previous tsar. Once the king is bound, spring arrives. Miryem is troubled to realize that the fae kingdom and its inhabitants, including those who helped her, will all be destroyed as the king is drained. She goes to her husband and learns that, while the Staryk have always raided the human world, they began trying to exterminate Lithvas with brutal winters only after Mirnatius became tsar. Through the magical connection between the fae and human kingdoms, the demon caused the weakening of the Staryk world.

Miryem frees the king after extracting a promise that he will end the killing winters and the raids. Chernobog, enraged, threatens Irina until she offers to take him to the Staryk kingdom. There, Miryem lures the demon into the king’s treasury, and once he is surrounded by silver, she turns it into gold. Unable to bear the touch of solid sunlight on his skin, Chernobog flees back to the human world. In the mortal lands, the demon attempts to turn on Irina, but finds himself powerless when she reminds him of their bargain not to harm her or anyone of hers. As tsarina, she counts all the people of Lithvas as hers - including the tsar. Chernobog is thus forced from Mirnatius's body and killed.

As spring has returned to Lithvas, Miryem is obliged to remain in the Staryk kingdom until the day of the first snow. However, when she returns to the human world, she realizes that she has become attached to the kingdom, its people, and its king. She is nevertheless astonished when the king asks for permission to court her. She consents, and the pair are wed two weeks later. Miryem notes that, in accordance with Jewish custom, her husband signed his name on their marriage contract - but in accordance with Staryk custom, she will never reveal it to anyone.

== Reception ==
Spinning Silver was widely praised upon its release. It was a finalist for Best Novel in both the 2018 Nebula Awards and the 2019 Hugo Awards. The novel won the American Library Association's Alex Award in 2019, the 2019 Locus Award for Best Fantasy Novel, and the 2019 Audie Award for Fantasy.

The New York Times called it "a perfect tale about the songs of ice and fire." Vox called Novik "one of the definitive YA voices of her era."
