= Naomi Novik =

American author (born 1973)

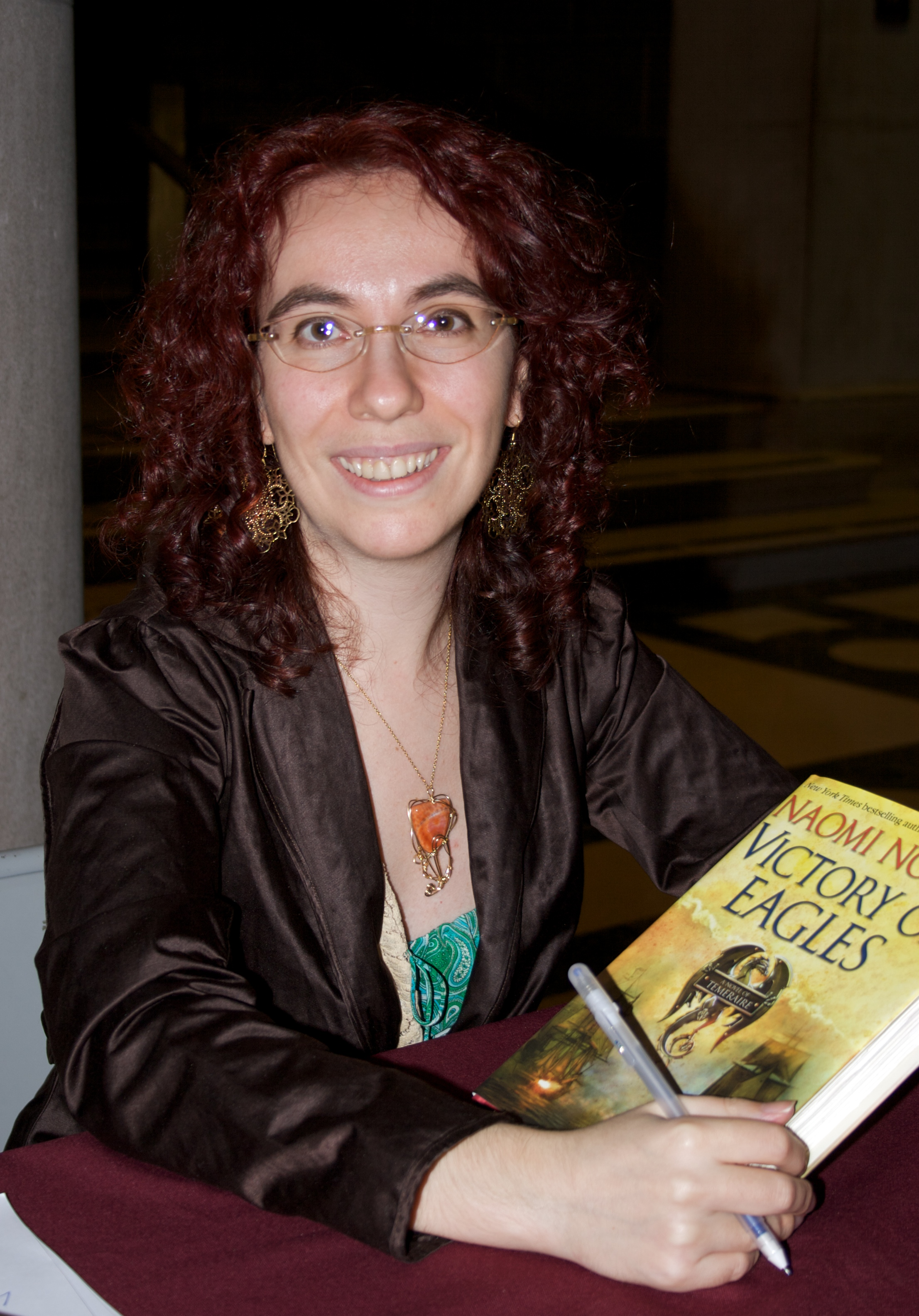
- Novik in 2008
- Born: New York, US
- Education: Brown University (BA); Columbia University (MS)
- Occupations: Novelist; computer programmer
- Spouse: Charles Ardai
- Children: 1
- Writing career
- Genres: Historical fantasy; alternate history
- Notable awards: See below
- Website: naominovik.com

Naomi Novik is an American author of speculative fiction. She is known for her Temeraire series (2006–2016), an alternate history of the Napoleonic Wars involving dragons; and her Scholomance trilogy (2020–2022). Her standalone fantasy novels Uprooted (2015) and Spinning Silver (2018) were inspired by Polish folklore and the Rumpelstiltskin fairy tale respectively. She also helped create the Organization for Transformative Works and was a cofounder of their project Archive of Our Own. Novik has won many awards for her work, including the Alex, Audie, British Fantasy, Locus, Mythopoeic and Nebula Awards.

== Early life ==
Novik grew up in Roslyn Heights on Long Island. She is a second-generation American; her father's family were Lithuanian Jews, and her mother's family were Polish Catholics. Displaying an interest in reading at a young age, she read The Lord of the Rings at age six, and developed a love for Jane Austen soon afterward.

She received a bachelor's degree in English literature at Brown University and holds a master's degree in computer science from Columbia University. She participated in the design and development of the computer game Neverwinter Nights: Shadows of Undrentide, until she discovered that she preferred writing over game design.

== Career ==
Novik's first novel, His Majesty's Dragon (Temeraire in the UK) is the first novel in the Temeraire series, an alternate history of the Napoleonic Wars in a "Flintlock Fantasy" world where dragons are abundant and are used in aerial combat. His Majesty's Dragon won the Compton Crook Award in 2007 and was nominated for the Hugo Award for Best Novel. Temeraire: In the Service of the King is omnibus volume collecting the first three books of the series (His Majesty's Dragon, Throne of Jade, and Black Powder War); it won the Locus Award for Best First Novel in 2007.

In September 2006, Peter Jackson optioned the rights to the Temeraire series, intending to produce three or more live-action films, but the rights have since reverted to Novik. The Temeraire series has also been released in audiobook format. The first five audiobooks were released by Books on Tape, beginning in 2007, and read by Simon Vance. The sixth audiobook was released by Tantor Audio in September 2010, also read by Vance.

In September 2007, Novik was awarded the John W. Campbell Award for Best New Writer for best new science fiction writer of 2006. In 2011, Novik wrote Will Supervillains Be on the Final?, a graphic novel about the next generation of high-flying costumed crusaders. Yishan Li illustrated the comic with manga-styled art.

In 2015, Novik published Uprooted, a standalone novel "set in a fantasy world inspired by the Kingdom of Poland". It won the Nebula Award for Best Novel, the British Fantasy Award for Best Fantasy Novel, the Locus Award for Best Fantasy Novel, and the Mythopoeic Fantasy Award. Warner Bros. purchased the film rights to Uprooted; Ellen DeGeneres and Jeff Kleeman signed on to produce the film through their production company, A Very Good Production.

In 2016, Novik published "Spinning Silver", a short story retelling the Rumpelstiltskin fairy tale, in the fantasy anthology The Starlit Wood: New Fairy Tales. Two years later, she expanded the story into her second standalone novel, Spinning Silver, which won the 2019 Locus Award for Best Fantasy Novel, the 2019 Alex Award, and the 2019 Audie Award for Fantasy.

In 2020, Novik published A Deadly Education, the first in a trilogy set in the Scholomance, the retelling of folklore about a school of black magic. The main character, Galadriel "El" Higgins, a half-Welsh, half-Indian sorceress, must survive to graduation while controlling her destructive abilities. Universal Pictures purchased the film rights to the Scholomance series in advance, assigning Todd Lieberman and David Hoberman of Mandeville Films to develop and produce the films. Upon its release, A Deadly Education was criticized for a passage where the hairstyle known as dreadlocks is described as susceptible to an infestation of bug-like magical creatures. Novik later apologized for "evok[ing] a racist stereotype" about Afro-textured hair. She revised the passage for future reprints, and promised that the sequel novels will not be sent to reviewers and publishers before "revisions are fully complete and a final sensitivity read has happened."

On September 17, 2024, Novik published Buried Deep and Other Stories, a collection of previously published and new short stories.

On September 19, 2025, Novik published a novella titled The Summer War about a young girl with magical powers on a quest to undo a curse she put on her brother.

== Activism ==
Novik helped to organize the Organization for Transformative Works (OTW), a non-profit organization dedicated to the advancement of fan-media including fan fiction, fan videos (vids), and real-person fiction. In 2007, she was one of the three directors of the nonprofit.

Novik was a co-founder of Archive of Our Own (AO3), a project of OTW that began in 2007 to create an online archive of fan fiction. At the 2019 Hugo Award ceremony, AO3 won the award for Best Related Work; Novik accepted the prize on behalf of all AO3's creators and readers.

== Personal life ==
Novik is married to entrepreneur and writer Charles Ardai. They live in Manhattan. They have one child, a daughter named Evidence Novik Ardai, who was born in 2010.

== Awards and nominations ==
Novik has won the British Fantasy, Locus, Mythopoeic and Nebula Awards, and received nominations for the Hugo and World Fantasy Awards. In 2024, Novik would be a recipient of the Inkpot Award at the annual San Diego Comic Con.

Award	Category	Year	Work	Result	Ref.
Alex Award	Adult book	2019	Spinning Silver	Won	(Note: The Alex Awards are given to books written for adults that have special appeal to young adults.)
Audie Award	Fantasy	2019	Spinning Silver	Won	
British Fantasy Award	Fantasy novel	2016	Uprooted	Won	
Compton Crook Award	New writer	2007	His Majesty's Dragon	Won	
Goodreads Choice Awards	Fantasy novel	2018	Spinning Silver	Nominated	
Hugo Award	Novel	2007	His Majesty's Dragon	Nominated	
Hugo Award	Novel	2016	Uprooted	Nominated	
Hugo Award	Novel	2019	Spinning Silver	Nominated	
Hugo Award	Novella	2026	The Summer War	Nominated	
Hugo Award	Series	2017	Temeraire	Nominated	
John W. Campbell Award	New writer	2007	Naomi Novik	Won	
Locus Award	Fantasy novel	2016	Uprooted	Won	
Locus Award	Fantasy novel	2019	Spinning Silver	Won	
Locus Award	Fantasy novel	2022	The Last Graduate	Nominated	
Locus Award	First novel	2007	Temeraire: In the Service of the King	Won	(Note: An omnibus volume collecting His Majesty's Dragon, Throne of Jade, and Black Powder War.)
Locus Award	Novelette	2016	"Spinning Silver"	Nominated	(Note: Published in The Starlit Wood: New Fairy Tales.)
Lodestar Award	Young adult book	2021	A Deadly Education	Nominated	
Lodestar Award	Young adult book	2022	The Last Graduate	Won	
Mythopoeic Award	Adult literature	2016	Uprooted	Won	
Mythopoeic Award	Adult literature	2019	Spinning Silver	Won	
Nebula Award	Novel	2016	Uprooted	Won	
Nebula Award	Novel	2019	Spinning Silver	Nominated	
World Fantasy Award	Novel	2016	Uprooted	Nominated	

== Publications ==
=== Standalone novels ===
- Uprooted. Del Rey. 2015. ISBN 9780804179034.
- Spinning Silver. Del Rey / Macmillan. 2018. ISBN 9781509899012.

=== Standalone novellas ===
- The Summer War. Del Rey. 2025. ISBN 9780593984703.

=== Temeraire series ===
1. His Majesty's Dragon. Del Rey. 2006. ISBN 9780345481283.
2. Throne of Jade. Del Rey. 2006. ISBN 9780345481290.
3. Black Powder War. Del Rey. 2006. ISBN 9780345481306.
4. Empire of Ivory. Del Rey. 2007. ISBN 9780345496874.
5. Victory of Eagles. Del Rey. 2008. ISBN 9780345496881.
6. Tongues of Serpents. Del Rey. 2010. ISBN 9780345496898.
7. Crucible of Gold. Del Rey. 2012. ISBN 9780345522863.
8. Blood of Tyrants. Del Rey. 2013. ISBN 9780345522894.
9. League of Dragons. Del Rey. 2016. ISBN 9780345522924.

==== Omnibus editions ====
- Temeraire: In the Service of the King. Science Fiction Book Club. 2006. ISBN 9780739468715.
- In His Majesty's Service: Three Novels of Temeraire. Del Rey. 2009. ISBN 9780345513540.

=== Scholomance trilogy ===
- A Deadly Education. Del Rey. 2020. ISBN 9780593128480.
- The Last Graduate. Del Rey. 2021. ISBN 9780593128862.
- The Golden Enclaves. Del Rey. 2022. ISBN 9780593158357.

=== Collections ===
- Golden Age and Other Stories. Subterranean Press. 2017. ISBN 9781596068292.
- Buried Deep and Other Stories. Del Rey. 2024. ISBN 9780593600351.

=== Short fiction ===
- "Araminta, or, the Wreck of the Amphidrake" in the anthology Fast Ships, Black Sails (Night Shade Books, 2008) ISBN 978-1-59780-094-5.
- "Apples" (Novik's official website, 2005)
- "Commonplaces" in the anthology The Improbable Adventures of Sherlock Holmes (Night Shade Books, 2009) ISBN 978-1-59780-160-7
- "Feast or Famine" (Novik's official website, 2006)
- "In Autumn, a White Dragon Looks Over the Wide River" in the omnibus In His Majesty's Service: Three Novels of Temeraire (Del Rey, 2009) ISBN 978-0345513540
- "Vici" in the anthology The Dragon Book: Magical Tales from the Masters of Modern Fantasy, edited by Jack Dann and Gardner Dozois (Ace Books, 2009) ISBN 978-0-441-01764-5
- "Purity Test" in the anthology Zombies vs. Unicorns, edited by Holly Black and Justine Larbalestier (Margaret K. McElderry Books, 2010) ISBN 978-1-4169-8953-0
- "Seven Years from Home" in the anthology Warriors, edited by George R. R. Martin and Gardner Dozois (Tor Books, 2010) ISBN 978-0-7653-2048-3
- "Priced to Sell" in the anthology Naked City: Tales of Urban Fantasy, edited by Ellen Datlow (St. Martin's Griffin, 2011) ISBN 978-0-3123-8524-8
- "Lord Dunsany's Teapot" in the anthology The Thackery T. Lambshead Cabinet of Curiosities, edited by Ann & Jeff Vandermeer (Harper Voyager, 2011) ISBN 978-0062004758
- "Rocks Fall" in the anthology The Mad Scientist's Guide to World Domination, edited by John Joseph Adams (Tor Books, 2013) ISBN 978-0-7653-2644-7
- "In Favour with Their Stars" in the anthology Unfettered, edited by Shawn Speakman (Grim Oak Press, 2013) ISBN 978-0-9847-1363-9
- "Castle Coeurlieu" in the anthology Unfettered II, edited by Shawn Speakman (Grim Oak Press, 2016) ISBN 978-1-9441-4505-7
- "Spinning Silver" in the anthologyThe Starlit Wood: New Fairy Tales, edited by Dominik Parisien and Navah Wolfe (Saga Press, 2016) ISBN 978-1-4814-5612-8
- "Seven" in the anthology Unfettered III, edited by Shawn Speakman (Grim Oak Press, 2019) ISBN 978-1-9441-4526-2
