= Damiano's Lute =

1984 fantasy novel by R. A. MacAvoy

- Author: R. A. MacAvoy
- Language: English
- Genre: Fantasy
- Publication date: 1984
- Pages: 254
- Preceded by: Damiano

Damiano's Lute is a fantasy novel by R. A. MacAvoy published in 1984.

== Plot summary ==
Damiano's Lute is a novel in which former mage Damiano tries to survive as he wanders around Renaissance Italy while it suffers from a plague.

== Reception ==
Dave Langford reviewed Damiano's Lute for White Dwarf #70, and stated that "though it reads well, the characters seem thinner, flatter, less convincing this time around. That's the trouble with writing well, Ms MacAvoy - the blasted critics expect you to write even better."

== Reviews ==
- Review by Faren Miller (1984) in Locus, #278 March 1984
- Review by Lynn F. Williams (1984) in Fantasy Review, June 1984
- Review by Tom Easton (1984) in Analog Science Fiction/Science Fact, September 1984
- Review by Mike Christie (1984) in Foundation, #32 November 1984
- Review by Helen McNabb (1985) in Vector 128
