= Damiano (novel) =

1984 novel by R. A. MacAvoy

- Author: R. A. MacAvoy
- Language: English
- Genre: Fantasy
- Publication date: 1984
- Pages: 243
- Followed by: Damiano's Lute

Damiano is a fantasy novel by American writer R. A. MacAvoy, published in 1984.

== Plot summary ==
It tells the story of the alchemist Damiano, who takes his lute on a quest to bring peace to his war-torn hometown.

== Reception ==
Dave Langford reviewed Damiano for White Dwarf #66, and stated that "MacAvoy has a neat touch with small magics and period detail, and writes with charm - which could be a problem for her if, as some reviewers of the sequels have suggested, it slips into saccharine and disneyfication. I hope not."

Colin Greenland reviewed the novel for Imagine magazine, stating that "a mild, reflective kind of fantasy, disrupted by the incidents of extreme violence the reluctant wizard has to cause and confront. R A MacAvoy's lucid, attractive writing has won her much popularity in American. It would be good to see her do well here too."

== Reviews ==
- Review by Faren Miller (1983) in Locus, #275 December 1983
- Review [French] by Élisabeth Vonarburg (1984) in Solaris, #54
- Review by Don D'Ammassa (1984) in Science Fiction Chronicle, January 1984
- Review by Baird Searles (1984) in Isaac Asimov's Science Fiction Magazine, April 1984
- Review by Tom Easton (1984) in Analog Science Fiction/Science Fact, April 1984
- Review by Lynn F. Williams (1984) in Fantasy Review, June 1984
- Review by Roger C. Schlobin (1984) in Fantasy Review, July 1984
- Review by Mike Christie (1984) in Foundation, #32 November 1984
