= Tea with the Black Dragon =

1983 fantasy novel by R. A. MacAvoy

- Cover of first edition (paperback)
- Author: R. A. MacAvoy
- Language: English
- Genre: Fantasy
- Publisher: Bantam Books
- Publication date: 1983
- Publication place: United States
- Media type: Print (hardcover & paperback)
- Pages: 166
- ISBN: 0-553-23205-3
- OCLC: 12481236
- LC Class: CPB Box no. 2920 vol. 1
- Followed by: Twisting the Rope

Tea with the Black Dragon is a 1983 fantasy novel by American writer R. A. MacAvoy. It led to a sequel, Twisting the Rope.

== Plot introduction ==
Martha Macnamara is called west to San Francisco by a message from her daughter Elizabeth, a computer programmer. When she arrives, however, Elizabeth has disappeared. Mayland Long, an Asian gentleman who is skilled in both human and computer languages—and who may be a transformed 2,000-year-old Chinese dragon—aids Martha in her search for her daughter. As they search for clues to Elizabeth's disappearance, they discover hints that Elizabeth is involved in a dangerous crime.

== Reception ==
David Langford has called it a "pleasant little novel" and "engaging", while qualifying it as "only just fantasy". James Nicoll has cited it as an example of how perception of a book can be affected by historical context, noting that when he reread it in 2014, it was "still an often charming period piece, just not as charming" as it was when he originally read it in 1983; in particular, he emphasizes that it "isn't quite" an example of the "white savior" trope, but "this book can see ['white savior'] from where it is standing". Similarly, Jo Walton—while praising MacAvoy's approach to the novel's central philosophical questions—states that she "remember(s) being excited by what seems to me today [in 2010] to be charming, but quite slight", and posits that "a great deal of the popularity and acclaim came from how lovely it is, and the rest of it came from how amazingly unusual it was in 1983 to have a fantasy novel using Chinese mythology and with a Chinese protagonist".

Greg Costikyan reviewed Tea with the Black Dragon in Ares Magazine #16 and commented that "Tea with the Black Dragon is a book mystery lovers, computer people, and fantasy fans will all enjoy. In a way, it is a shame that Bantam's packaging is so oriented toward the fantasy market, as this is the kind of book that could do very well in the mainstream."

It was nominated for the Nebula Award for Best Novel of 1983, the 1984 Hugo Award for Best Novel and the 1984 Locus Award for Best First Novel in 1984; it also earned MacAvoy the John W. Campbell Award for Best New Writer. It additionally found a place in David Pringle's Modern Fantasy: The Hundred Best Novels (1988).
