= His Majesty's Dragon =

2006 novel by Naomi Novik

- First paperback edition cover
- Author: Naomi Novik
- Cover artist: Dominic Harman (above); Andrew Davidson (Voyager paperback)
- Language: English
- Series: Temeraire
- Genres: Alternate history; fantasy
- Publisher: Del Rey (US); Voyager (UK)
- Publication date: March 28, 2006 (US); August 2006 (UK)
- Publication place: United States
- Media type: Print (paperback, hardcover)
- Pages: 356
- ISBN: 978-0345481283
- Followed by: Throne of Jade

His Majesty's Dragon, published in the UK as Temeraire, is the first novel in the Temeraire alternate history/fantasy series by American author Naomi Novik. The story is set during an alternate-history version of the Napoleonic Wars, in which dragons not only exist but are used as a staple of aerial warfare in Asia and Europe. The dragons of the story are portrayed as sapient and intelligent, capable of logical thought and human speech. The series centers primarily on events involving Temeraire (the titular dragon) and his handler, Will Laurence.

The first book of the series tells how Laurence, formerly a Captain in the Royal Navy, becomes Temeraire's handler, and of their early training in preparation for battles against Napoleon's aerial fleet. It was first published in 2006. It won the 2007 Compton Crook Award for best novel in the science fiction/fantasy genre during 2006 by a first-time author.

== Plot summary ==
In the winter of 1804 ("the year four" as the characters call it) or thereabouts, during the War of the Third Coalition, HMS Reliant under Captain William Laurence seizes the French Amitie, a 36-gun frigate. Laurence and the crew of the Reliant find an unhatched dragon-egg on board and declare it a prize captured from the French. Unfortunately, the egg is near hatching, and in order to bring the resulting dragonet into service with Britain's Aerial Corps, it must accept harness and a handler as soon as possible. Laurence orders every officer aboard to prepare to make the attempt, but the dragonet, unusual with all-black hide and six spines on his wings, chooses Laurence, who names him Temeraire, after a second-rate itself named for a French ship likewise brought into service of Britain. Despite Laurence's reluctance to leave polite society and join the Aerial Corps, whose men are almost married to their dragons and who are known for grievous informality, he and Temeraire develop a deep affection.

The Reliant lands in Madeira, where Laurence and Temeraire await the Aerial Corps' response concerning their enlisting in the Corps; they are eventually ordered to a training camp at Loch Laggan in Scotland. Meanwhile, the naturalist Sir Edward Howe identifies Temeraire as a rare Chinese Imperial, a breed rarely seen outside China, much less in Britain; only the Celestials are rarer. The Corps also attempt to reassign Temeraire to a more experienced handler, Lieutenant Dayes; Laurence is surprised at how close he has grown to Temeraire in this short time and rejoices when Temeraire rejects Dayes entirely.

After a brief stopover at his father Lord Allendale's estate, where Laurence reveals his new profession to his family, Temeraire and Laurence arrive in the covert of Loch Laggan. Here Laurence meets Celeritas, the dragon training-master; Catherine Harcourt, the young female captain of the Longwing Lily (Longwings, the only acid-spitters in Britain, insist on female captains), whose formation they will join; Berkley, the captain of the Regal Copper Maximus; and Rankin, a captain of noble family, and his abused Winchester Levitas. Temeraire sees his first action when Victoriatus, a Parnassian, is injured in combat and must be carried back to base. Laurence and Temeraire also adopt their flight and ground crew, headed by Lt. John Granby; Granby, a friend to Dayes, showed initial hostility to Laurence, but the two overcome their difficulties during the mission to aid Victoriatus. Finally, Laurence meets Jane Roland, mother of one of his runners, Emily Roland, who is being groomed to captain the Longwing Excidium after Jane herself retires; Jane and Laurence eventually become lovers.

During their training, Celeritas introduces Choiseul, a French deserter, and his dragon Praecursoris, whom Temeraire views as competition. Choiseul is revealed to be a double agent when he attempts to kidnap Lily and Captain Harcourt. After interrogation, he admits that he was actually sent to steal Temeraire, whom the Chinese had gifted to Napoleon as his personal mount. The spirits of the captains, dragons, and crew are bolstered by the victory at the Battle of Trafalgar (October 1805), which erases Napoleon's navy and diminishes his aerial strength; additionally, while Nelson is raked by fire from a Spanish Flecha-del-Fuego, he survives to fight another day. While they are celebrating, Rankin and a mortally wounded Levitas arrive at Dover with important intelligence: Napoleon had not planned to send troops over by sea, as originally predicted. Instead, he plans to send them by air, using transports hauled by dragons, accompanied by Napoleon's aerial force. This disrupts celebrations as the captains at the Dover covert prepare for combat, knowing their great disadvantage in numbers.

The Dover dragons fly out to meet the French aerial armada, their primary objective the destruction of the transports. Unfortunately, the superior French numbers prove telling, and soon some of the transports land. However, Temeraire, earlier deemed unlikely to develop a breath weapon, unleashes a powerful shockwave roar, which destroys the transport they are attempting to take down. This turns the tide of battle and the French signal retreat. At the celebration party held in order to commemorate the victory, Sir Edward seeks out Laurence. He then reveals that Temeraire is actually Celestial; the roar, called the "divine wind," is unique to that breed. The Chinese reserve Celestials solely for emperors and royalty. Though this opens plenty of new worries concerning China's apparent friendship with France, Temeraire dismisses the idea of going to France, preferring his life in Britain with Laurence.

== Characters ==
- Captain William Laurence: Former captain of HMS Reliant while in the Royal Navy. Circumstance compels him to become captain of the dragon Temeraire and join the Aerial Corps, the least respected branch of the British military.
- Temeraire: A powerful dragon and the titular character of the series. Named after Téméraire, a French vessel captured during the Napoleonic wars, his name means "reckless". Captain William Laurence is his companion. He possesses an extremely practical, inquisitive, and sometimes too blunt personality; however, he sometimes can be overly sensitive about the differences between his appearance and that of western dragons. He is also quite possessive and protective of Laurence.
- Lieutenant John Granby: The head of the Loch Laggan flight crew and firm friend to Laurence
- Lieutenant Dayes: An experienced dragon handler whom the Loch Laggan covert attempt to place as Temeraire's master.
- Celeritas: A dragon, head of dragon training at the Loch Laggan covert. His name means "swiftness".
- Jane Roland: Captain of the Longwing dragon Excidium, Jane is also the mother of one of Laurence's runners, Emily (who stands next in line to captain Excidium).
- Choiseul: A Frenchman who joins the Loch Laggan covert

== Animated series adaptation ==
In September 2022, it was reported that the novel will be adapted into an adult animated drama series at Fox. It will be produced by Fox Entertainment, Bento Box Entertainment, and Orion Television (the first animated series produced by Orion Television since Bill & Ted's Excellent Adventures). Ben Queen will write and executive produce the series.

== Reception ==
His Majesty's Dragon was very favorably received, and won the 2007 Compton Crook Award for best novel in the science fiction/Fantasy genre during 2006 by a first-time author. It was also nominated for the Hugo Award for Best Novel in 2007, but lost out to Rainbows End by Vernor Vinge. A compilation of the first three Temeraire books titled Temeraire: In Service of the King won the Locus Award for Best First Novel in 2007. Entertainment Weekly called it "a completely authentic tale, brimming with all the detail and richness one looks for in military yarns as well as the impossible wonder of gilded fantasy," and Booklist referred to it as having "characters who win one’s heart from the beginning" and calls Novik as "a most promising new author."

The book received numerous reviews:

- Review by Sue Thomason (2005) in Vector 244
- Review by Faren Miller (2006) in Locus, #540 January 2006
- Review by Christine Mains (2006) in SFRA Review #275
- Review by Gary K. Wolfe (2006) in Locus, #541 February 2006
- Review by Rose Fox (2006) in Strange Horizons, 27 February 2006
- Review by Carolyn Cushman (2006) in Locus, #543 April 2006
- Review by Romie Stott (2006) in Reflection's Edge, April 2006
- Review by Stephanie Burgis (2006) in Interzone, April 2006
- Review by Paul Witcover (2006) in Realms of Fantasy, June 2006
- Review by Peter Heck (2006) in Asimov's Science Fiction, August 2006
- Review by Michelle West (2006) in The Magazine of Fantasy & Science Fiction, September 2006
- Review by Lynn Calvin (2006) in Helix, Fall 2006
- Review [Dutch] by Paul van Leeuwenkamp (2006) in Holland-SF 2006, #5
- Review by Dorman T. Shindler (2006) in Subterranean, Issue #4
- Review by Rich Horton (2007) in Black Gate, Spring 2007
- Review by Anne K. G. Murphy (2007) in Subterranean Online, Summer 2007
- Review by Damien Broderick and Paul Di Filippo (2012) in Science Fiction: The 101 Best Novels 1985-2010
