= Temeraire (series) =

Novel series by Naomi Novik

- Author: Naomi Novik
- Country: United States
- Language: English
- Genre: Alternate history; fantasy
- Publisher: Del Rey Books (US); Harper Voyager (UK)
- Published: 2006–2016
- Media type: Print (hardback & paperback); Audiobook; E-book
- No. of books: 9

Temeraire is a series of nine alternate history fantasy novels written by American author Naomi Novik. The novels follow the adventures of Captain William Laurence and his dragon, the eponymous Temeraire, and reimagine events of the Napoleonic Wars with "an air force of dragons, manned by crews of aviators". His Majesty's Dragon, the first entry in the series, won the Compton Crook Award in 2007 and was nominated for the Hugo Award for Best Novel the same year. Temeraire: In the Service of the King, an omnibus volume collecting the first three novels, won the Locus Award for Best First Novel in 2007. Temeraire was nominated for the Hugo Award for Best Series in 2017.

== Novels ==
1. His Majesty's Dragon (2006) / Temeraire (UK)
2. Throne of Jade (2006)
3. Black Powder War (2006)
4. Empire of Ivory (2007)
5. Victory of Eagles (2008)
6. Tongues of Serpents (2010)
7. Crucible of Gold (2012)
8. Blood of Tyrants (2013)
9. League of Dragons (2016)

Additionally, Novik published two omnibus volumes collecting the first three novels of the series. Temeraire: In the Service of the King (2006) won the Locus Award for Best First Novel in 2007. In addition the same first three books were published by Del Ray as In His Majesty's Service: Three Novels of Temeraire (2009). This omnibus volume also includes the Temeraire short story "In Autumn, A White Dragon Looks Over the Wide River".

In 2017, Novik published Golden Age and Other Stories, an anthology of Temeraire short stories inspired by fanart of the series.

== Plot overview ==
The series revolves around William Laurence and his dragon Temeraire. Laurence is a captain in the British Royal Navy, serving in combat against Napoleon's navy when he recovers a dragon egg unlike any other known to the British. The egg soon hatches, and Temeraire, a Chinese dragon, is born. Under the impression that an "unharnessed" dragon will become feral and unmanageable, Laurence becomes Temeraire's companion. Despite the difficulties this causes, Laurence begins to think of the dragon as his dearest friend. This forces a change in the officer's life, drawing him from the prestigious Royal Navy to the less desirable Royal Aerial Corps.

The remainder of the original trilogy follows the adventures of Laurence and Temeraire as they do battle with the forces of Imperial France and the diplomatic fallout caused by Captain Laurence's adoption by the Emperor of China.

The fourth novel, Empire of Ivory, deals with Laurence and Temeraire seeking a cure for a contagious disease introduced by a North American dragon, which spreads throughout the British dragons while Napoleon seeks to press his advantage. The fifth novel, Victory of Eagles, is the account of Napoleon's planned invasion of the United Kingdom, forcing a British retreat to Scotland, while Laurence faces the consequences of their treason in taking the cure for the illness to the French. The sixth novel begins within the penal colony of Australia (Laurence's death sentence for treason commuted to transport to the colony), and a chase across the continent to a sudden discovery that has far-reaching consequences.

The seventh book has Laurence returned to service and sent to South America in an attempt to secure an alliance with the Inca Empire (which still exists, though reduced, in the series timeline), then to Asia again. In the eighth book, Laurence is partially amnesiac due to injury as Temeraire and the crew deal with new intrigues in feudal Japan and Imperial China before flying to Russia in time to be involved in the French invasion of Russia.

== Characters ==
=== Humans ===
- Admiral/Captain William Laurence: Former captain of HMS Reliant while in the Royal Navy. Served aboard HMS Belize, HMS Orient, and others prior to receiving his post on the Reliant. Now Captain in the Aerial Corps and captain to Temeraire. Primary figure in the series. He comes from a wealthy family distantly related to the king. Although he serves in the Aerial Corps (the least respected military branch of England), he is a gentleman and the son of Lord Allendale. While remaining a captain for most of the series, in the final book of the series, he receives a promotion to admiral. There are a few descriptions of his physique in the later books. He is mentioned to be tall, blue-eyed, blond, and broad-shouldered.
- Arthur Hammond: British diplomat attending Laurence's mission to China whose primary goal is to preserve or to improve British standing with the Chinese Empire, even if it comes at the expense of giving Temeraire to the Chinese. He is generally disliked by the crew of the Allegiance and Temeraire's crew. He was adopted by Churki, and he has become the object of her affections, though he has no desire whatsoever to belong to a dragon.
- Admiral Jane Roland: Captain to Excidium. Mother of Emily Roland, a member of Laurence's crew. Becomes intimate with Laurence after he breaks off his engagement. Later promoted to Admiral.
- Admiral Lenton: Admiral in charge of the covert at Dover. Obversaria was his dragon, until the third book in the series.
- Captain Berkley: Stationed at Dover. Captain to the Regal Copper, Maximus.
- Captain Catherine Harcourt: Stationed at Dover. First female dragon-captain Laurence meets. Twenty years old when promoted to captain. Captain to the Longwing Lily. Captain Harcourt has a brief liaison with Captain Thomas Riley which leads to pregnancy. Catherine is later pressured to marry him for legal and social reasons as Captain Riley's estate is entailed and his mother and female relations will have no source of income if he dies before producing a son.
- Captain Langford James: Courier. Captain to Volatilus. First dragon-captain to meet Laurence. Gives him a basic introduction to how the Aerial Corps works.
- Captain Rankin: Abusive Captain to Levitas. Becomes Captain to Caesar in Tongues of Serpents.
- Captain Thomas Riley: Lieutenant under Captain Laurence on HMS Reliant in His Majesty's Dragon. In Throne of Jade is promoted to captain of HMS Allegiance, a dragon-transport. Family owns slaves in the Caribbean. Is married to, and has a son with, Captain Catherine Harcourt.
- Demane: A native of the Xhosa tribe (along with his brother Sipho), he leads Laurence to the cure for the draconic flu. He was later assigned to fly with Arkady and his feral dragons as he was fluent in both English and Durzagh languages (in addition to his native Xhosa). He later becomes the unofficial captain of Kulingile, a very large heavyweight dragon.
- Emily Roland: A member of Captain William Laurence's crew, she was in the first book mistaken for a boy. Daughter of Captain Jane Roland.
- Hannah Erasmus: Wife of Reverend Erasmus. A former slave, she is a member of the Tswana tribe and returns to Africa with her husband and children. After her husband is slain in an encounter with her native tribe, she is recognized and freed and ultimately elects to stay in Africa.
- Lieutenant John Granby: Laurence's second-in-command. Served under Captain Portland on Laetificat. Becomes Iskierka's Captain.
- Prince Yongxing: Son to the Jiaqing Emperor of China. He holds anti-Western feelings and seeks to bring Temeraire back to China. Schemes to ultimately supplant his younger brother's claim to the Imperial Throne. Companion to the white (albino) dragon Celestial Lien.
- Reverend Josia Erasmus: A former slave in Jamaica. Joins Temeraire and Laurence in their expedition to Africa to find a cure for the draconic flu.
- Tenzing Tharkay: A guide hired by a banker in Constantinople to bring Captain Laurence and his crew to the Turkish capital. While duplicitous in appearance, this is an air cultivated purposefully by Tharkay due to his mixed heritage.

=== Dragons ===
- Temeraire: A Chinese Celestial dragon (mistaken for an Imperial dragon in the first book) and the titular character of the series. Named after Téméraire, a French vessel captured during the Napoleonic wars, his name means "reckless". His Chinese name is Lung Tien Xiang. Captain William Laurence is his companion. Possesses an extremely practical, inquisitive, and sometimes too blunt personality, although he sometimes can be overly sensitive about the differences between his appearance and that of western dragons. He is also quite possessive and protective of Laurence.
- Lien: A Chinese Celestial dragon partnered with Prince Yongxing until his death. As a white (albino) dragon, she is regarded as bad luck in the Chinese culture. She is an enemy of Temeraire and Laurence, holding them responsible for the death of Yongxing. She joins the Napoleonic forces and is the primary subject of the short story "In Autumn, A White Dragon Looks Over The Wide River".
- Maximus: a male Regal Copper heavy-weight dragon also in Temeraire's formation; suffers badly during the dragon plague. Handled by Captain Berkeley.
- Lily: a female Longwing heavy-weight dragon, nominally the leader of Temeraire's formation; also suffers during the dragon plague. Handled by Captain Harcourt—a female captain, since Longwings only take female captains (though this is not widely known outside the Aerial Corps).
- Iskierka: a female Kazilik (fire-breathing) dragon, native to Turkey but bought by the British during the Napoleonic Wars; prone to fighting and insubordination. Handled by Captain John Granby, formerly of Temeraire's crew.

== Cancelled film adaptation ==
In 2006, The Hollywood Reporter announced that Peter Jackson, best known for directing the Lord of the Rings film trilogy, had optioned the rights to the Temeraire series. Jackson stated that Temeraire "is a terrific meld of two genres that I particularly love—fantasy and historical epic. I can't wait to see Napoleonic battles fought with a squadron of dragons. That's what I go to the movies for." On July 24, 2009, in an interview with IGN, Jackson said he had considered making a television mini-series instead; he was worried that if the first movie flopped at the box office, it would put the story at a full-stop and leave it incomplete. On February 24, 2016, during Naomi Novik's Ask Me Anything (AMA) on Reddit, Novik said the film rights had reverted to her once again, and there is no plan for any Temeraire film adaptation.
