= R. A. MacAvoy =

American fantasy and science fiction author (born 1949)

- Born: Roberta Ann MacAvoy; December 13, 1949 (age 76); Cleveland, Ohio, U.S.
- Education: Case Western Reserve University (BA)
- Occupation: Author
- Spouse: Ronald Allen Cain (m. 1978)
- Writing career
- Genres: Fantasy; Science fiction
- Notable awards: John W. Campbell Award for Best New Writer (1984)
- Website: ramacavoy.com

Roberta Ann MacAvoy (born December 13, 1949) is an American fantasy and science fiction author. Several of her books draw on Celtic or Zen themes. She won the John W. Campbell Award for Best New Writer in 1984.

== Biography ==
R. A. MacAvoy was born in Cleveland, Ohio. She attended Case Western Reserve University and received a B.A. in 1971. She worked from 1975 to 1978 as an assistant to the financial aid officer of Columbia College of Columbia University and from 1978 to 1982 as a computer programmer at SRI International before turning to full-time writing in 1982. She married Ronald Allen Cain in 1978.

R. A. MacAvoy was diagnosed with dystonia (a neuro-muscular disorder causing painful sustained muscle contractions) following the publication of her Lens of the World series in the early 1990s. She now has the disorder under control and has returned to writing.

== Bibliography ==
=== The Black Dragon series ===
- Tea with the Black Dragon (1983)
- Twisting the Rope (1986)

=== The Damiano series ===
- Damiano (1983, Bantam)
- Damiano's Lute (1984, Bantam)
- Raphael (1984, Bantam)
- omnibus edition titled A Trio for Lute

These books were adapted by Bantam Software into a text adventure, I, Damiano: The Wizard of Partestrada, for MS-DOS and Apple IIe computers.

=== The Lens of the World series ===
- Lens of the World (1990)
- King of the Dead (1991)
- Winter of the Wolf [vt The Belly of the Wolf] (1993)

=== Ewen Young ===
- The Go-Between (2005) – Amazon Shorts e-book, republished with editorial changes as In Between (2009)
- Death and Resurrection (2011, Prime Books) – includes The Go-Between/In Between

=== Other novels ===
- The Book of Kells (1985)
- The Grey Horse (1987)
- The Third Eagle (1989)
- Albatross (with Nancy Palmer) (2016)
- Shimmer (with Nancy Palmer) (2018)
