= The Golden Enclaves =

Fantasy novel

- Author: Naomi Novik
- Language: English
- Series: The Scholomance
- Genre: Fantasy novel
- Publisher: Del Rey
- Publication date: September 27, 2022
- Publication place: United States
- ISBN: 9780593158357
- Preceded by: The Last Graduate

The Golden Enclaves is a 2022 fantasy novel written by American author Naomi Novik following El's adventures after her escape from the Scholomance school of magic. It was published by Del Rey on September 27, 2022 and is the third book of The Scholomance Trilogy.

== Plot ==
Following the events of The Last Graduate, El is reunited with her mother Gwen and tries to come to terms with Orion's sacrifice. Liesel arrives, informing El that she is needed as the London enclave is under attack and not likely to survive. After defending the London enclave from the besieging maw-mouth, she requests that they open their gardens to non-enclave wizards. The Dominus of London, Christopher Martel, tries to enchant El, but she and Liesel escape with the help of the non-enclaver Yancy. Determined to end Orion's suffering within the maw-mouth, El decides she must return to the Scholomance to kill it.

They travel to New York City, where Chloe arranges for them to meet Balthasar and Ophelia Lake, Orion's parents. They are horrified to discover that Ophelia is a powerful and manipulative maleficer. Even so, El accepts their help to access the physical location of the Scholomance in Portugal, which they find empty of all maleficaria. They find an altered and dangerous Orion in the school and bring him back to Wales so he can be healed by Gwen.

They then travel to Beijing, where Liu and the enclave there are being attacked by the same mysterious force that attacked the London enclave. El fights them off and rescues Liu, and learns that the process of creating or extending an enclave results from the sacrifice of a wizard. The sacrificed person becomes the center of a new maw-mouth, which is then unleashed on the world. El builds a new foundation using the spells in the Golden Stone sutras with the help of all the enclavers, stabilizing the enclave. Orion flies back to New York City despite learning of Ophelia's true nature and that she has plans to use him to increase her power. El fends off numerous attacks against enclaves around the world, before realizing that the attacks are a direct result of her killing maw-mouths. She passes on a warning to Ibrahim in Dubai, but goes to Mumbai instead.

El meets her great-grandmother, Deepthi, who reveals that she used a prophecy to drive El and her mother away, years ago, in order to protect El from being discovered by Ophelia. Deepthi explains that Ophelia killed all the Scholomance graduates of one class to power a great working of darkness and was expecting a balance, which came in the form of El. Afterwards, El reconciles with her family. Liesel calls to inform her that an enclave war has begun at the Scholomance doors, and El rushes back to with Aadhya and Liu following from Beijing.

El arrives to find that the estate has been shut down to mundanes and that wizards from all enclaves have arrived to join the fight between the New York and Shanghai enclaves. El and her companions enter the Scholomance New York enclave and allies defending against the Shanghai enclave and their allies. El is pulled to the Shanghai side, where she meets the Dominus of Shanghai, Li Shanfeng who explains that throughout their history, enclave-builders had been opening portals to send the maw-mouths they created as far away as possible, especially to countries which were too weak to object. He reveals that El and Orion destroying most of the maleficaria meant that the maw-mouths lost their typical prey and became more active in hunting wizards. Ophelia created Orion as a human maw-mouth who could be used in the war and Shanfeng tells El that he has been waiting for her to arrive to kill Orion. El and Orion fight each other and she uses a killing spell against his maw-mouth manifestation, but modifies the spell before he dies, keeping Orion in the world to protect the children with his power. Liu and Aadhya join their mana to El to help power the spell, followed by the rest of the wizards. The spell works, giving Orion a metaphorical foundation to stay in the world and ending the war.

Afterwards, El and her mother go to the Mumbai compound and El resolves to hunt maw-mouths and re-establish enclave foundations with the Golden Stone sutras. Her plan has to remain secret, though, so that enclaves will willingly open their doors to more wizards. El returns to the Scholomance, which will be reopened, to have a picnic with Orion, who will be staying at the school to fight maleficaria and protect the children.

== Reception ==
The book received a starred review from Publishers Weekly, which praised it as a conclusion to the trilogy. Lacy Baugher Milas of Paste wrote that The Golden Enclaves is "a rich, fully satisfying conclusion that makes the whole trilogy stronger and more meaningful in retrospect." Adrienne Martini gave the book a mostly positive review for Locus, writing that "While Novik’s world is grim, El’s sardonic voice and tender heart make the conclusion to her journey a reward." Elizabeth Tabler, of GrimDark Magazine, praised its intrigue and morally grey characterization.

Katherine Mangu-Ward of Reason magazine described the book as an example of "Novik's particular strength...writing worlds where the mechanics make sense—the mathematics of power, the economics of magic, the politics of institutions—even as they offer dark echoes of our own dysfunctional reality."

Kirkus Reviews gave the book a mostly negative review, calling it "a high-concept adventure that doesn't think its readers are clever enough to get it."
