= Empire of Ivory =

Novel by Naomi Novik

- First edition (US)
- Author: Naomi Novik
- Cover artist: Dominic Harman (above); Andrew Davidson (Voyager paperback)
- Language: English
- Series: Temeraire
- Genres: Alternate history; fantasy
- Publisher: Del Rey (US); Voyager (UK)
- Publication date: September 25, 2007 (US); November 5, 2007 (UK)
- Publication place: United States
- Media type: Print (hardback & paperback); e-book
- Pages: 384
- ISBN: 978-0345496874
- Preceded by: Black Powder War
- Followed by: Victory of Eagles

Empire of Ivory is the fourth novel in the Temeraire alternate history/fantasy series by American author Naomi Novik. Set in Africa, the novel follows William Laurence and his dragon Temeraire's search for a cure to the disease that has paralyzed the dragon community. Novik visited southern Africa in search of places in the fourth novel.

Empire of Ivory was released in paperback in North America by Del Ray on September 25, 2007. The British hardcover edition was published by Voyager on November 5, 2007.

== Plot summary ==
Laurence and Temeraire arrive back in the United Kingdom, following their evacuation of Danzig in Black Powder War. Their relief at arriving safely is short-lived as Napoleon continues his preparations for an invasion of the British Isles. When questioned about the lack of British air support for the Prussians, Laurence discovers that Britain had no dragons to spare: a flu-like epidemic has infected the greater part of them, and British science has yet to devise a cure. To combat it, Temeraire, Iskierka and the ferals are forced to fly frantic patrols, both as a show of force and to prevent Napoleon from getting reconnaissance in over the contaminated coverts; at one point Temeraire is forced to knock a French courier-dragon, Sauvignon, out of the sky and down into one of the coverts, risking infection himself.

Temeraire and Laurence continue to develop their notions of draconic equality in British society; they find common cause with William Wilberforce and the abolitionist movement in exchange for assistance from prominent political leaders. Before they can continue their plans, they are enlisted to return to Africa to seek a cure for the draconic flu, which Temeraire caught and was cured of in Throne of Jade; his immunity is proven when he fails to contract the illness from Sauvignon and the other dragons. The entire formation is shipped to the Cape Colony aboard the Allegiance, along with a black missionary, Rev. Josiah Erasmus, formerly of the Lunda people, his wife Hannah and their daughters. The missionaries are manumitted slaves, causing tension between Laurence and Allegiance captain Tom Riley, a staunch supporter of the slave trade and occasional friend of Laurence. Riley is also further thrown off balance by the discovery that some of the Aerial Corps' officers, including Lily's captain Catherine Harcourt, are women (the acid-spitting Longwing breed, along with a few others, refuse to accept male handlers).

After several weeks of searching, the formation makes land at the Cape of Good Hope; Maximus, the Regal Copper, is so weary that his handler Berkley does not believe he will ever return home. However, enough fungi are found to cure the formation, and with the help of two African boys, Demane and Sipho, and their small dog, they set out to find more. In the end, they discover the fungus in a cave, being fertilized by dragon dung: it has been deliberately cultivated. Scarcely has this realization set in that the Aerial Corps are beset by Tswana humans and dragons; the British beasts, who have been sent back to the Cape with their precious cargo, are unable to prevent their aircrews from being captured, and Rev. Erasmus' attempts to intercede only lead to his death, as the Lunda are known slavers. The British contingent is taken captive and brought back to the Tswana capitol, a settlement at Mosi-oa-Tunya (what is today called Victoria Falls) for imprisonment and interrogation. This is particularly challenging to Harcourt, who had become intimate with Riley during the voyage and is now bearing his child.

Hannah Erasmus, taken from the Tswana some twenty years ago, is of particular importance during their captivity: not only is she able to provide some intercession for the British, but her word is given extra weight by Kefentse, her dragon ancestor who is overjoyed to have her back. The Tswana, in addition to being fiercely offended by the depredations of the African slave trade on their people, practice a form of ancestor worship in which dragons are brought up to believe they are the reincarnations of former (human) leaders. This makes their resistance to the slave trade even fiercer since dragons are deeply possessive of those humans they consider their own. Though Laurence is able to establish some small rapport with Prince Moshueshue and apologize for the mushroom theft, the ancestors Mokhachane and Kefentse remained unconvinced by the mere words of Laurence.

Temeraire, who has picked up some Xhosa from Demane and Sipho, is able to talk the location of Mosi-oa-Tunya out of some feral dragons, and he, Dulcia and Lily organize an escape for their crews. But before they have managed to return to the Cape, the Tswana are already on overrunning the Colony, and indeed all European ports on the African coast. Lily's formation retreats to Great Britain aboard the Allegiance; whilst at sea, Riley marries Catherine Harcourt, more at his insistence than hers. Upon returning to Britain, they discover that the latest abolitionist bill in Parliament was defeated by strong opposition from Admiral Horatio Nelson and that Sauvignon, now infected with the plague, has "escaped" back to France. Laurence and Temeraire are horrified to realize that Government and Admiralty alike have countenanced the wholesale slaughter of, not only every French dragon but quite probably every dragon in Eurasia. Acting on their consciences, they steal a tub of cultivated mushrooms and fly the English Channel to deliver the cure to the French. For this, they earn the personal respect of Napoleon Bonaparte. However, Laurence turns down the Emperor's offer of asylum, preferring to return to his beloved Commonwealth and answer for his treason.

=== Notes ===
Naomi Novik went to Africa to do research for Empire of Ivory, including hiking and a safari in Botswana.

== Reception ==
Publishers Weekly gave a mixed review stating:

Novik fills the conflict's lead-up with lengthy meditations on dragon civil rights and England's abolition movement, making for a fitful, pedantic first half. But most will find the richness of Novik's developing world—and characters—to be worthy compensation for the slow start. (Oct, 2007)

Other reviews:

- Review by Sharon Dodge (2007) in Reflection's Edge, October 2007
- Review by Faren Miller (2007) in Locus, #562 November 2007
- Review [Dutch] by Tessel M. Bauduin [as by Tessel Bauduin] (2007) in Holland-SF 2007, #4
- Review by Carolyn Cushman (2007) in Locus, #563 December 2007
