= Black Powder War =

2006 novel by Naomi Novik

- Author: Naomi Novik
- Cover artist: Dominic Harman (above); Andrew Davidson (Voyager paperback, left)
- Language: English
- Series: Temeraire
- Genres: Alternate history; fantasy
- Publisher: Del Rey (US); Voyager (UK)
- Publication date: May 30, 2006 (US); August 2007 (UK)
- Publication place: United States
- Media type: Print (paperback)
- Pages: 400
- ISBN: 978-0345481306
- Preceded by: Throne of Jade
- Followed by: Empire of Ivory

Black Powder War is the third novel in the Temeraire alternate history/fantasy series by American author Naomi Novik. The novel was first published by Del Rey in the United States on May 30, 2006, and by Voyager in the United Kingdom in August 2007.

== Plot introduction ==
The story is set during an alternate history version of the Napoleonic Wars, in which dragons not only exist but are used as a staple of aerial warfare in Asia and Europe. The dragons of the story are portrayed as sentient and intelligent, capable of logical thought and human speech. The series centers primarily on events involving Temeraire (the titular dragon) and his handler, William Laurence.

== Plot summary ==
Cover of the UK release

In Black Powder War, Captain William Laurence and Temeraire - along with the surviving members of their crew - are ordered to make all haste and return from the mission to China via Istanbul, where they are to take custody of three dragon eggs purchased from the Ottoman Empire by the British Government. Laurence and his first lieutenant John Granby are confused at the provenance of these orders, as there must surely be some British dragon nearer to Istanbul than they, but the promise of the eggs spurs them on. In a prologue, Laurence also observes the burial of Prince Yongxing, the primary antagonist of the previous novel, and the mourning of his much-distrusted albino dragon Lien. She is seen in company with the French diplomat de Guignes, which Laurence feels cannot bode well.

Deciding to eschew the Allegiance, which suffers fire damage at the opening of the novel, Laurence takes the services of a guide named Tharkay, the well-bred but ostracized child of a British diplomat and a Nepalese woman. With his help, the group survives ambush in the Central Asian deserts, befriends a pack of feral dragons in the mountains of Turkestan, and makes its way to Istanbul. Once there, however, they face clear betrayal; the Sultan has chosen to ally himself with Napoleon, probably at the urging of Lien, who is now present in his court, and has seized the exorbitant payment offered him by the British Crown whilst simultaneously reneging on any intent to hand over the eggs in return. Lien makes a private visit to Temeraire and announces that she has set herself to his destruction; as opposed to merely killing him, she wishes to see Temeraire deprived of all he holds dear, and live out the rest of his life in squalor and despondency. In the end, Laurence and his crew simply steal the promised eggs, especially once they discover that one of them is a fire-breather of the Kazilik breed, something England has been trying to get into her Aerial Corps for hundreds of years. She hatches before the end of the book, naming herself Iskierka and accepting Granby as her captain.

Temeraire and company escape to Europe, making an eventual landing in Austria. Laurence, who has been out of touch for over a year, learns more details of Napoleon's crushing victory at the Battle of Austerlitz, which he had only received scant details of during the voyage to China. The only good news to emerge from that battle is a Prussian declaration of alliance against Napoleon for what history today calls the War of the Fourth Coalition, and Laurence routes his travel through that nation. However, upon landing, Temeraire is immediately requisitioned: the Prussians were promised 20 dragons by the British Aerial Corps and have received none of them. Temeraire integrates into their ranks without much complaint, but the Prussian tactics, developed by Frederick the Great, are outdated and easily countered by the creativity of not only Napoleon but of Lien, who has once again made common cause with Temeraire's enemies. Despite the personal presence of King Frederick William III of Prussia and his wife Queen Louise, the Prussians are soundly defeated in the Battle of Jena-Auerstedt, and Temeraire is forced to ferry the royal family away. Thereafter the British crew find themselves at the fortress of Danzig, soon about to fall under siege.

Though Laurence's main goal throughout the novel is the transport of the dragon eggs back to England, Temeraire's is to spread the word of what he observed in China. Britain's attitude towards dragons is that they must be harnessed by a human rider and put into service in the Aerial Corps as something of a steed, kept far away from human society and treated as well (or poorly) as the handler sees fit; as seen in the previous novel, Chinese dragons are instead full citizens who can own property and hold office in and of themselves. Temeraire's disappointment at Napoleon's victories is thus deeper than mere patriotism: Laurence has impressed on him the fact that the war must be prioritized over any consideration of equal draconic rights. His most unlikely ally, however, is Laurence himself: He has seen the material and significant benefits of human-draconic co-operation, which cemented the French triumphs. If Britain is to survive, Laurence confirms grimly, her human population must overcome their fear of dragons.

The turning-point of the siege is the arrival of Tharkay, now at the head of the flock of Turkish ferals. Using these dragons and techniques observed in China, Laurence is able to rig out the entire flock as public transportation and evacuate the city, dropping the civilians into the waiting arms of the Royal Navy. Despite a harried exfiltration under fire and the loss of the city, Temeraire and Laurence are relieved to finally be returning to Britain.

== Reception ==
The book received numerous reviews:

- Review by Carolyn Cushman (2006) in Locus, #543 April 2006
- Review by Faren Miller (2006) in Locus, #545 June 2006
- Review by Rose Fox (2006) in Strange Horizons, 14 August 2006
- Review by Lynn Calvin (2006) in Helix, Fall 2006
- Review by Rich Horton (2007) in Black Gate, Spring 2007
- Review by Stephanie Burgis (2007) in Interzone, April 2007
