= Throne of Jade =

Novel by Naomi Novik

- First paperback edition cover
- Author: Naomi Novik
- Cover artist: Dominic Harman (above); Andrew Davidson (Voyager paperback, left)
- Language: English
- Series: Temeraire
- Genres: Alternate history; fantasy
- Publisher: Del Rey (US); Voyager (UK)
- Publication date: April 25, 2006 (US); August 2007 (UK)
- Publication place: United States
- Media type: Print (paperback)
- Pages: 398
- ISBN: 978-0345481290
- Preceded by: His Majesty's Dragon
- Followed by: Black Powder War

Throne of Jade is the second novel in the Temeraire alternate history/fantasy series written by American author Naomi Novik. It was published by Del Rey first in the United States on April 25, 2006, and was published in the United Kingdom in August 2007 by Voyager.

== Background ==
The story is set during an alternate history version of the Napoleonic Wars, in which dragons not only exist but are used as a staple of aerial warfare in Asia and Europe. The dragons are portrayed as sapient and intelligent, capable of logical thought and human speech. The series centers on events involving Temeraire (the titular dragon) and his handler, William Laurence. The first book of the series centered on how Laurence, formerly a captain in the Royal Navy, becomes Temeraire's handler, and their early training in preparation for battles against Napoleon's aerial fleet.

== Plot ==
Cover of the UK release

After defeating Napoleon's forces at the battle of Dover, Laurence and Temeraire are confronted by envoys from Imperial China, including Prince Yongxing, brother of the Jiaqing Emperor. The Chinese are eager to recover their rare Celestial dragon from the British. According to Chinese law, Celestials are only allowed to accompany royalty; Temeraire was intended for Napoleon, Emperor of the French, while Laurence, a mere commoner, is deemed unworthy. This raises consternation within Government, as a Napoleon allied with China—the most powerful nation in the world, isolationist and able to keep other countries at bay through their superior draconic husbandry—would be impossible to oppose.

After several failed attempts to convince Laurence and the Royal Aerial Corps to return Temeraire to China, the Chinese and the British agree to have Temeraire and his flight crew — including Laurence — accompany the Imperial envoys back to China. As the land routes are deemed unsafe, the Navy has a dragon transport, HMS Allegiance, captained by Laurence's former second officer Tom Riley, ferry the Celestial and his crew to China. During the voyage, attempts are made on the life of Laurence in order to remove him from Temeraire. In addition, political machinations on the part of the British, French, and Chinese are discovered that threaten the position of Britain in the East, as well as the stability of the Chinese throne. News of the defeat of the Third Coalition at the Battle of Austerlitz and subsequent death of Prime Minister William Pitt casts a pall over the voyage. Finally, Laurence has ongoing difficulties with both Captain Riley, a staunch supporter of the slave trade (Laurence himself descends from known abolitionists), and the diplomat Arthur Hammond, sent along to smooth the operation.

During the sea voyage, Temeraire catches a respiratory illness from Volatilus, a slow-minded though sweet-natured Greyling serving in the courier corps who visits the Allegiance with dispatches. They stop at Cape Town, lately captured in the Battle of Blaauwberg, to look for a remedy. By use of a posset made using an extremely smelly mushroom, the cooks of the Chinese delegation are able to restore Temeraire to health. This event, though seemingly unimportant at the moment, shapes the next two novels of the series.

After their arrival in China, Temeraire gets to meet his family, including his mother, and observes the conditions of dragonkind in China, which he deems far superior to British custom: Chinese dragons are citizens in their own right who, amongst other things, may take the Imperial Examination. He begins courting an Imperial dragon named Mei, and is exposed to a young boy of Yongxing's company, who attempts to befriend him. Laurence, for his part, attempts to learn Chinese, liaises with the French ambassador de Guignes, and suffers more direct attempts on his life, including confrontations with Yongxing and his companion, the albino Celestial Lien. Hammond is able to deduce that Yongxing has designs on Prince Mianning, the heir-apparent whose dragon is Temeraire's twin brother, and that Temeraire was sent to France not because the Chinese esteem Napoleon—indeed, the British are relieved to learn that the Chinese have no particular esteem for Napoleon at all, laying their greatest fear to rest—but so that Temeraire himself could not be used to complicate the line of succession. Indeed, Yongxing has had him returned to China so that Temeraire may lend legitimacy to a puppet king Yongxing intends to set upon the throne.

At a theatre production in the British delegation's honor, Yongxing attempts to put his plans in motion. However, he is prevented by the actions of Temeraire and Laurence, and is himself killed in the ensuing scuffle. As a result, the Emperor of China himself adopts Laurence as an honorary son, at a stroke resolving the issues with Laurence's social status and easing relations with Britain. Temeraire, after much deliberation, decides to return to Britain, partially out of love for Laurence and partially to attempt to bring the greater civil liberties of the Middle Kingdom back to the Commonwealth.

== Reception ==
Throne of Jade was released to positive reviews; SF Reviews described it as having "sumptuous locales, thrilling action, and thematic and emotional heft," while Bookmarks Magazine called it "a solid second entry in what is shaping up to be an intriguing series." Strange Horizons stated in their review that readers of the series "will find plenty to enthrall and captivate them."

The book received other reviews as well:

- Review by Carolyn Cushman (2006) in Locus, #543 April 2006
- Review by Faren Miller (2006) in Locus, #545 June 2006
- Review by Rose Fox (2006) in Strange Horizons, 14 August 2006
- Review by Lynn Calvin (2006) in Helix, Fall 2006
- Review by James Bacon (2007) in Vector 252
- Review by Rich Horton (2007) in Black Gate, Spring 2007
