= Compton Crook Award =

Speculative fiction award for first novel

- Awarded for: The best English-language debut novel in the science fiction, fantasy, or horror genre
- Presented by: Baltimore Science Fiction Society
- First award: 1983; 43 years ago
- Website: www.bsfs.org/CCA/bsfsccnu-current.htm

The Compton Crook Award is presented by the Baltimore Science Fiction Society (BSFS) to the year's best English-language debut novel in the science fiction, fantasy, or horror genres, as voted by its members. BSFS confers the award at their annual science fiction convention, Balticon, held in Baltimore on Memorial Day weekend. The award, also known as the Compton Crook/Stephen Tall Award, has been presented since 1983. Compton Crook, who wrote under the name of Stephen Tall, was a long-time Baltimore resident, Towson University professor, and science fiction author who died in 1981.

The list of eligible books is published in the monthly newsletter so that all club members will have a chance to read and vote. The winning author receives a cash award of $1,000 as well as a plaque, and their Balticon attendance is sponsored for two years; in the second year, the author presents the award to their successor. The invitation to Balticon is intended in part as a professional networking opportunity for the new author.

== Winners and finalists ==
* Winners

Year	Author	Title	Ref.
1983	Donald Kingsbury*	Courtship Rite	
1984	Christopher Rowley*	The War for Eternity	
1984	Timothy Zahn	The Blackcollar	
1984	John C. McLoughlin	The Helix and the Sword	
1984	Dan Henderson	Paradise	
1984	M. Bradley Kellogg	A Rumor of Angels	
1984	R. A. MacAvoy	Tea with the Black Dragon	
1985	David R. Palmer*	Emergence	
1985	John Willett	Aubade for Gamelon	
1985	Patricia K. Morrison	The Copper Crown	
1985	Melissa Scott	The Game Beyond	
1985	Lloyd Arthur Eshbach	The Land Beyond the Gate	
1985	Howard Waldrop	Them Bones	
1986	Sheila Finch*	Infinity's Web	
1987	Thomas Wren*	The Doomsday Effect	
1987	Leo Frankowski	The Cross-Time Engineer	
1987	Robert R. Chase	The Game of Fox and Lion	
1987	Robert Charles Wilson	A Hidden Place	
1987	Lois McMaster Bujold	Shards of Honor	
1988	Christopher Hinz*	Liege-Killer	
1988	Michael Armstrong	After the Zap	
1988	C. S. Friedman	In Conquest Born	
1988	Emma Bull	War for the Oaks	
1989	Elizabeth Moon*	Sheepfarmer's Daughter	
1989	Melanie Rawn	Dragon Prince	
1989	Mary Stanton	The Heavenly Horse from the Outermost West	
1989	Don Sakers	The Leaves of October	
1990	Josepha Sherman*	The Shining Falcon	
1990	Teresa Edgerton	Child of Saturn	
1990	Doris Egan	The Gate of Ivory	
1990	Rosemary Kirstein	The Steerswoman	
1990	Nancy A. Collins	Sunglasses After Dark	
1990	John G. Cramer	Twistor	
1991	Michael Flynn*	In the Country of the Blind	
1991	William Mark Simmons	In the Net of Dreams	
1991	Katherine Blake	The Interior Life	
1992	Carol Severance*	Reefsong	
1992	Jane Fancher	Groundties	
1992	Michelle Sagara	Into the Dark Lands	
1993	Holly Lisle*	Fire in the Mist	
1993	Steven Gould	Jumper	
1994	Mary Rosenblum*	The Drylands	
1994	Gregory Benford (Note: Originally published under the pen name Sterling Blake; later re-issued under his own name)	Chiller	
1994	Patricia Anthony	Cold Allies	
1994	Martha Wells	The Element of Fire	
1995	Doranna Durgin*	Dun Lady's Jess	
1995	Sherry Gottlieb	Love Bite	
1995	Denise Lopes Heald	Mistwalker	
1996	Daniel Graham Jr.*	The Gatekeepers	
1996	Robin Hobb	Assassin's Apprentice	
1996	Valerie J. Freireich	Becoming Human	
1996	Pat Robertson	The End of the Age	
1996	Catherine Asaro	Primary Inversion	
1997	Richard Garfinkle*	Celestial Matters	
1998	Katie Waitman*	The Merro Tree	
1999	James Stoddard*	The High House	
2000	Stephen L. Burns*	Flesh and Silver	
2001	Syne Mitchell*	Murphy's Gambit	
2001	Jeffery D. Kooistra	Dykstra's War	
2001	Jo Walton	The King's Peace	
2001	Geoffrey A. Landis	Mars Crossing	
2001	Jim Butcher	Storm Front	
2001	Carol Berg	Transformation	
2002	Wen Spencer*	Alien Taste	
2003	Patricia Bray*	Devlin's Luck	
2004	E. E. Knight*	Way of the Wolf	
2005	Tamara Siler Jones*	Ghosts in the Snow	
2006	Maria V. Snyder*	Poison Study	
2007	Naomi Novik*	His Majesty's Dragon	
2007	Scott Lynch	The Lies of Locke Lamora	
2007	Joshua Palmatier	The Skewed Throne	
2007	Jana G. Oliver	Sojourn	
2008	Mark L. Van Name*	One Jump Ahead	
2008	Joe Abercrombie	The Blade Itself	
2008	Lisa Shearin	Magic Lost, Trouble Found	
2008	Patrick Rothfuss	The Name of the Wind	
2008	Sandra McDonald	The Outback Stars	
2009	Paul Melko*	Singularity's Ring	
2009	Jo Graham	Black Ships	
2009	Taylor Anderson	Into the Storm	
2009	Brent Weeks	The Way of Shadows	
2010	Paolo Bacigalupi*	The Windup Girl	
2010	D. D. Barant	Dying Bites	
2010	Jonathan L. Howard	Johannes Cabal the Necromancer	
2010	Gail Carriger	Soulless	
2011	James Knapp*	State of Decay	
2012	T. C. McCarthy*	Germline	
2013	Myke Cole*	Shadow Ops: Control Point	
2013	E. C. Myers	Fair Coin	
2013	Heather Anastasiu	Glitch	
2013	Jeff Salyards	Scourge of the Betrayer	
2013	Jay Kristoff	Stormdancer	
2014	Charles E. Gannon*	Fire with Fire	
2014	Ann Leckie	Ancillary Justice	
2014	Miriam Forster	City of a Thousand Dolls	
2014	Jason M. Hough	The Darwin Elevator	
2014	Vonnie Winslow	The Enchanted Skean	
2014	T. Eric Bakutis	Glyphbinder	
2014	Matt Bell	In the House Upon the Dirt Between the Lake and the Woods	
2014	Daniel M. Kimmel	Shh! It's a Secret: A Novel About Aliens, Hollywood, and the Bartender's Guide	
2015	Alexandra Duncan*	Salvage	
2015	Laline Paull	The Bees	
2015	Julia Mary Gibson	Copper Magic	
2015	James L. Cambias	A Darkling Sea	
2015	E. L. Tettensor	Darkwalker	
2015	William Campbell Powell	Expiration Day	
2015	Emmi Itäranta	Memory of Water	
2016	Fran Wilde*	Updraft	
2016	Holly Bodger	5 to 1	
2016	Kristi Charish	Owl and the Japanese Circus	
2016	Brian Groover	I Will Love You Forever	
2016	Kirsty Logan	The Gracekeepers	
2016	Marshall Ryan Maresca	The Thorn of Dentonhill	
2016	Cat Rambo	Beasts of Tabat	
2016	Ferrett Steinmetz	Flex	
2016	Josh Vogt	Enter the Janitor	
2017	Ada Palmer*	Too Like the Lightning	
2017	Yoon Ha Lee	Ninefox Gambit	
2017	David D. Levine	Arabella of Mars	
2017	Kathy MacMillan	Sword and Verse	
2017	Sylvain Neuvel	Sleeping Giants	
2017	T. C. Weber	Sleep State Interrupt	
2018	Nicky Drayden*	The Prey of Gods	
2018	Robyn Bennis	The Guns Above	
2018	Theodora Goss	The Strange Case of the Alchemist's Daughter	
2018	Vic James	Gilded Cage	
2018	Elan Mastai	All Our Wrong Todays	
2018	Cat Sparks	Lotus Blue	
2018	Karin Tidbeck	Amatka	
2019	R. F. Kuang*	The Poppy War	
2019	S. A. Chakraborty	The City of Brass	
2019	Rebecca Roanhorse	Trail of Lightning	
2019	Rena Rossner	Sisters of the Winter Wood	
2019	Lauren C. Teffeau	Implanted	
2019	Nick Clark Windo	The Feed	
2020	Arkady Martine*	A Memory Called Empire	
2020	Mike Chen	Here and Now and Then	
2020	Alix E. Harrow	The Ten Thousand Doors of January	
2020	Ada Hoffman	The Outside	
2020	Sarah Pinsker	A Song for a New Day	
2021	Micaiah Johnson*	The Space Between Worlds	
2021	Lindsay Ellis	Axiom's End	
2021	Rebecca McLaughlin	Nameless Queen	
2021	Karen Osborne	Architects of Memory	
2021	Andrea Stewart	The Bone Shard Daughter	
2021	K. M. Szpara	Docile	
2022	P. Djèlí Clark*	A Master of Djinn	
2022	John Appel	Assassin's Orbit	
2022	E. J. Beaton	The Councillor	
2022	Genevieve Gornichec	The Witch's Heart	
2022	Lena Nguyen	We Have Always Been Here	
2022	Kimblerly Unger	Nucleation	
2023	Alex Jennings*	The Ballad of Perilous Graves	
2023	Sarah J. Daley	Obsidian	
2023	Sara Mueller	The Bone Orchard	
2023	Ciel Pierlot	Bluebird	
2023	Sue Lynn Tan	Daughter of the Moon Goddess	
2023	Neon Yang	The Genesis of Misery	
2024	Kemi Ashing-Giwa*	The Splinter in the Sky	
2024	Moniquill Blackgoose	To Shape a Dragon's Breath	
2024	Bethany Jacobs	These Burning Stars	
2024	Brad Pawlowsk	Deathwind	
2024	Michael Thompson	How to Be Remembered	
2025	Samantha Mills*	The Wings Upon Her Back	
2025	Emily Hamilton	The Stars Too Fondly	
2025	Mariely Lares	Sun of Blood and Ruin	
2025	Kelly Link	The Book of Love	
2025	John Wiswell	Someone You Can Build a Nest In	
2026	Hayley Gelfuso*	The Book of Lost Hours	
2026	M. H. Ayinde	A Song of Legends Lost	
2026	Yaroslav Barsukov	Sleeping Worlds Have No Memory	
2026	Eiren Caffall	All the Water in the World	
2026	Antonia Hodgson	The Raven Scholar	
2026	Andrew Ludington	Splinter Effect	
