= Tensorate (novella series) =

Novella series by Neon Yang

Tensorate Series
- The Black Tides of Heaven; The Red Threads of Fortune; The Descent of Monsters; The Ascent to Godhood; The Tensorate Series
- Author: Neon Yang
- Cover artist: Yuko Shimizu
- Language: English
- Genre: Speculative fiction
- Publisher: Tor
- Published: 2017, 2018, 2019, 2021
- No. of books: 5

The Tensorate series is a collection of silkpunk science fantasy novellas written by Singaporean author Neon Yang. There are four books in the series, as well as a collection of all four novellas in one edition. The series has been nominated for the Hugo, Nebula, Locus, Lambda Literary Awards, and the World Fantasy Award. The series was published by Tor.com in the United States.

== Genre ==
The Tensorate Series is a form of speculative fiction, blending elements of science fiction, silkpunk, and fantasy.
