= Robert Cornog =

American physicist and engineer (1912–1998)

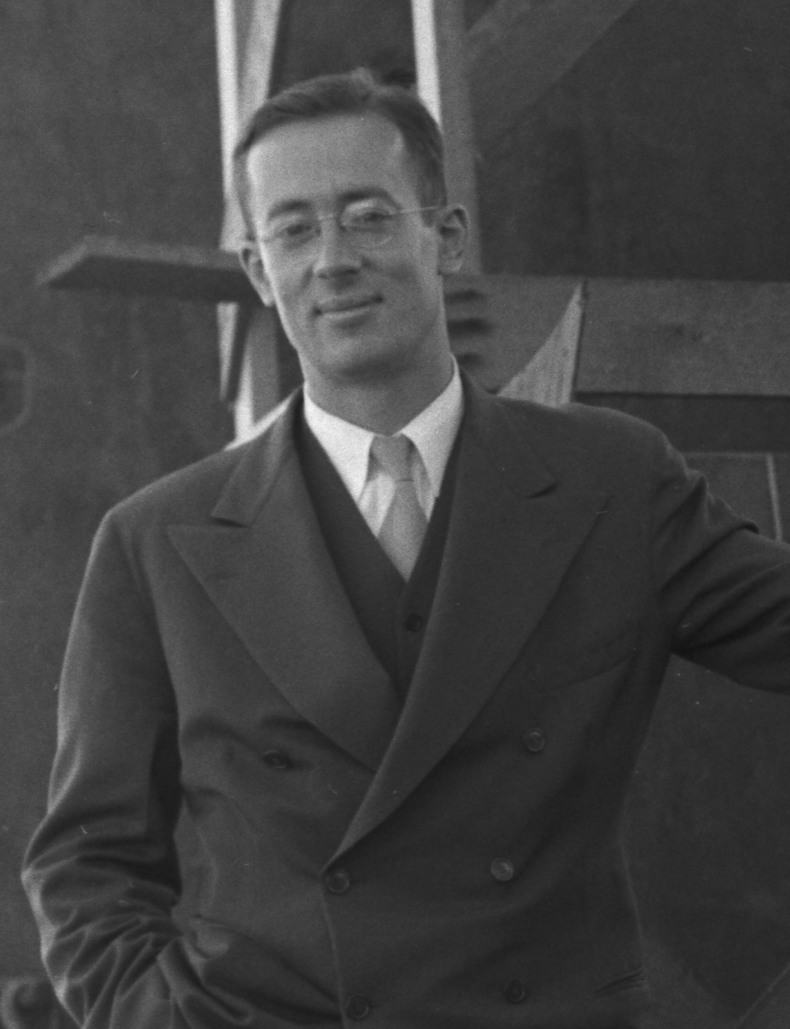
- Cornog in 1941
- Born: Robert Alden Cornog; July 7, 1912; Portland, Oregon
- Died: July 17, 1998 (aged 86)
- Education: University of Iowa; University of California, Berkeley
- Scientific career
- Thesis: Hydrogen and helium of mass three (1939)

Robert Alden Cornog (July 7, 1912 – July 17, 1998) was an American physicist and engineer who helped develop the atomic bomb and missile systems, and made significant discoveries regarding isotopes of hydrogen and helium.

A native of Portland, Oregon, who grew up in Iowa City, Cornog earned a bachelor's degree in mechanical engineering at the University of Iowa. After working for the United States Bureau of Reclamation on the Boulder Dam design, he studied at the University of California, Berkeley for his doctorate in physics.

His graduate student research led to the co-discovery, with Luis Alvarez, that hydrogen of atomic mass 3 (tritium) was radioactive, and that helium of mass 3 (helium-3) occurs in nature. He also assisted Emilio Segrè in the discovery of element 85, astatine.

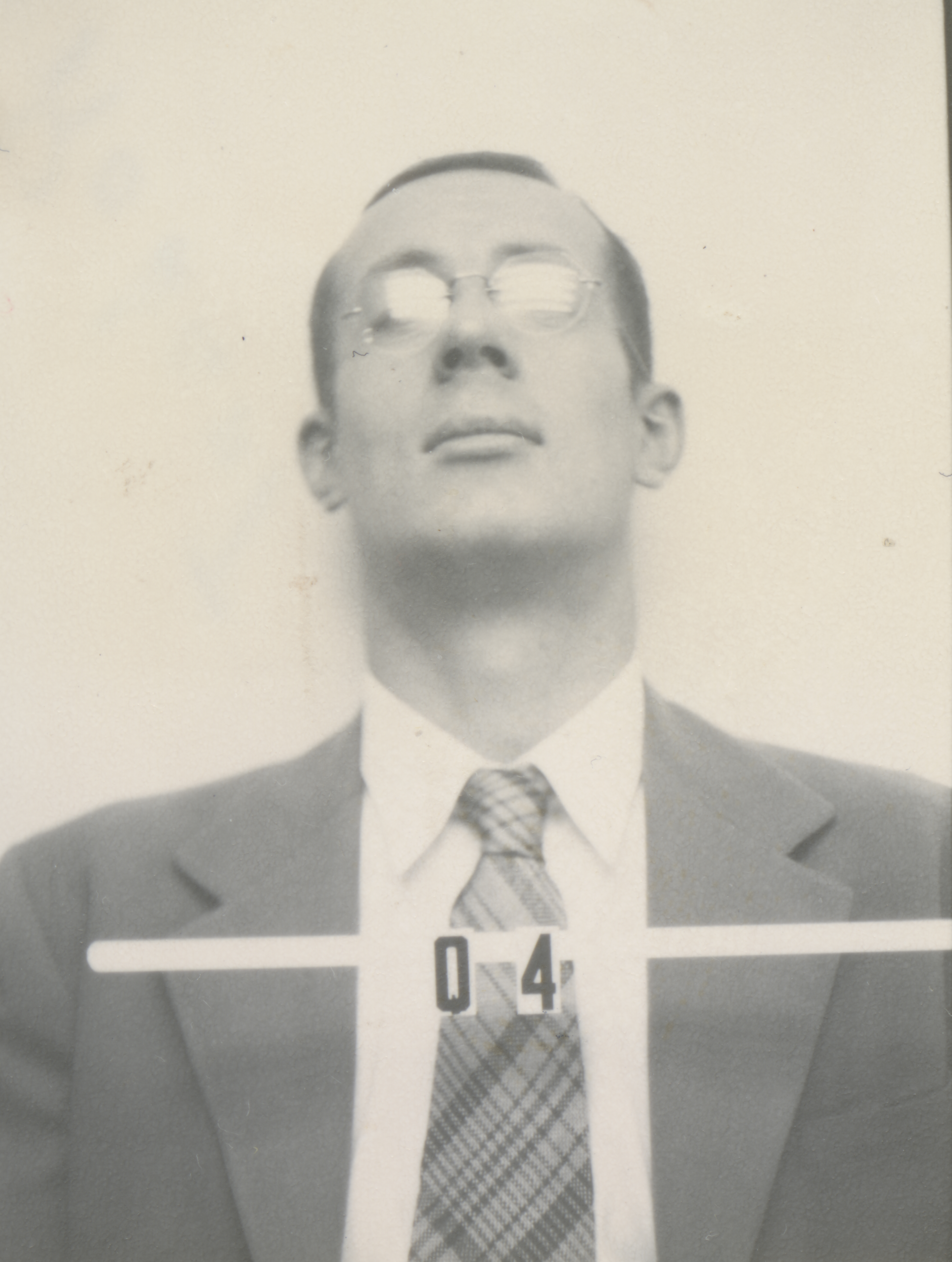
Cornog's ID badge photo from Los Alamos.

During World War II, Cornog designed magnetic equipment for ships and went to work on the Manhattan Project, successively at UC Berkeley, Princeton University and in Los Alamos, New Mexico. Cornog became chief engineer of the ordnance division of the atomic bomb development team and was involved in the development of the bomb's trigger mechanism.

Following World War II, he focused on aerodynamics, nuclear energy, and rocket engineering. He worked on missile systems for several Southern California companies, including Northrop, Space Technology Laboratories and Ramo-Wooldridge Corporation, which became TRW. Also an expert on vacuum technology, Cornog headed Vacuum Enterprises from 1967 to 1974 and managed product development for Torr Vacuum Products until 1984. He held several patents and served as a technical advisor on the film Fat Man and Little Boy, about the atomic bomb.

In 1959, Cornog predicted that in 40 to 50 years there would be worldwide color television broadcasts, satellites assembled in space, and accurate weather prediction.

Cornog was a close associate of rocket pioneer and occultist Jack Parsons. Science fiction author Robert A. Heinlein, a friend, dedicated his 1961 novel Stranger in a Strange Land to Cornog. Donald Kingsbury dedicated his 1986 novel The Moon Goddess and the Son to several people including "Robert Cornog for discussing the economics of the leoport."
