= The Mammoth Book of Fantastic Science Fiction =

The Mammoth Book of Fantastic Science Fiction: Short Novels of the 1970s
- Cover of first edition
- Editors: Isaac Asimov; Martin H. Greenberg; Charles G. Waugh
- Cover artist: Roy Virgo
- Language: English
- Series: The Mammoth Book of ... Science Fiction
- Genre: Science fiction
- Publisher: Robinson
- Publication date: 1992
- Publication place: United Kingdom
- Media type: Print (paperback)
- Pages: 535
- ISBN: 1-85487-112-9
- Preceded by: The Mammoth Book of New World Science Fiction
- Followed by: The Mammoth Book of Modern Science Fiction

The Mammoth Book of Fantastic Science Fiction: Short Novels of the 1970s is a themed anthology of science fiction short works edited by Isaac Asimov, Martin H. Greenberg, and Charles G. Waugh, the fifth in a series of six samplers of the field from the 1930s through the 1980s. It was first published in trade paperback by Robinson in 1992. The first American edition was issued in trade paperback by Carroll & Graf in the same year.

The book collects ten novellas by various science fiction authors that were originally published in the 1970s.

== Contents ==
- "Born with the Dead" (Robert Silverberg)
- "The Moon Goddess and the Son" (Donald Kingsbury)
- "Tin Soldier" (Joan D. Vinge)
- "In the Problem Pit" (Frederik Pohl)
- "Riding the Torch" (Norman Spinrad)
- "Mouthpiece" (Edward Wellen)
- "ARM" (Larry Niven)
- "The Persistence of Vision" (John Varley)
- "The Queen of Air and Darkness" (Poul Anderson)
- "The Monster and the Maiden" (Gordon R. Dickson)
