= World of Darkness Preludes: Vampire and Mage =

- Promotional art
- Developers: White Wolf Entertainment; Fula Fisken
- Publishers: White Wolf Entertainment; Asmodee (mobile)
- Director: Martin Ericsson
- Artists: Sarah Horrocks (Vampire); Zak Sabbath (Vampire)
- Writers: Sarah Horrocks (Vampire); Zak Sabbath (Vampire); Karin Tidbeck (Mage)
- Series: Vampire: The Masquerade; Mage: The Ascension
- Engine: Unity
- Platforms: Microsoft Windows, MacOS, Linux, Android, iOS
- Release: February 16, 2017
- Genre: Interactive fiction
- Mode: Single-player

World of Darkness Preludes: Vampire and Mage is a series of two interactive fiction video games developed by White Wolf Entertainment and Fula Fisken: Vampire: The Masquerade – We Eat Blood (Note: Also known as Vampire: Prelude or Vampire: The Masquerade – We Eat Blood and All Our Friends Are Dead.) and Mage: The Ascension – Refuge. They were released on February 15, 2017, individually for Android and iOS, and together as a set for Microsoft Windows, MacOS and Linux.

The games are set in the World of Darkness, and are based on White Wolf Publishing's tabletop role-playing games Vampire: The Masquerade and Mage: The Ascension. Vampire follows a fledgling vampire who communicates with one of their friends through text message conversations, and Mage follows a volunteer in a refugee camp, who learns that magic is real and that they can use it. Vampire was written and illustrated by Sarah Horrocks and Zak Sabbath, Mage was written by Karin Tidbeck, and both games were directed by Martin Ericsson. Following allegations against Sabbath of sexual abuse, which he has denied, the standalone Vampire and the World of Darkness Preludes set are no longer offered for sale.

Critics enjoyed the games and the return of World of Darkness video games after more than a decade since Vampire: The Masquerade – Bloodlines, and praised their visual presentations, although Vampire's writing and art were criticized as confusing at times. Critics enjoyed Mage's story for its high stakes and for Tidbeck's writing, and for the authenticity they could bring to its Swedish setting as a Swedish author.

== Gameplay ==
Typical gameplay in Vampire (top) and Mage (bottom). The visual presentations were well-received by critics for their atmosphere and portrayal of magic.

Vampire: The Masquerade – We Eat Blood and Mage: The Ascension – Refuge are interactive fiction games. In Vampire, the player must manage their character's vampiric hunger, and make choices determining whether to hang on to their human life or to move on. In Mage, the player must decide how to use their reality-altering power of True Magick, and whether to do good or evil with it. Vampire is presented entirely through the perspective of text message conversations with the player character's friends on their cell phone, while Mage uses a more typical Choose Your Own Adventure-style format.

== Plot ==
=== Vampire: The Masquerade – We Eat Blood ===
Vampire: The Masquerade – We Eat Blood lets the player take the role of a young artist who wakes up to learn that they have been turned into a vampire, and follows their first nights as undead.

=== Mage: The Ascension – Refuge ===
Mage: The Ascension – Refuge is set in Malmö, Sweden in 2015, and is themed around modern political and social issues. The player takes the role of Julia Andersson, a volunteer in a Syrian refugee camp, who learns that magic exists and that she has the power of True Magick.

== Development ==
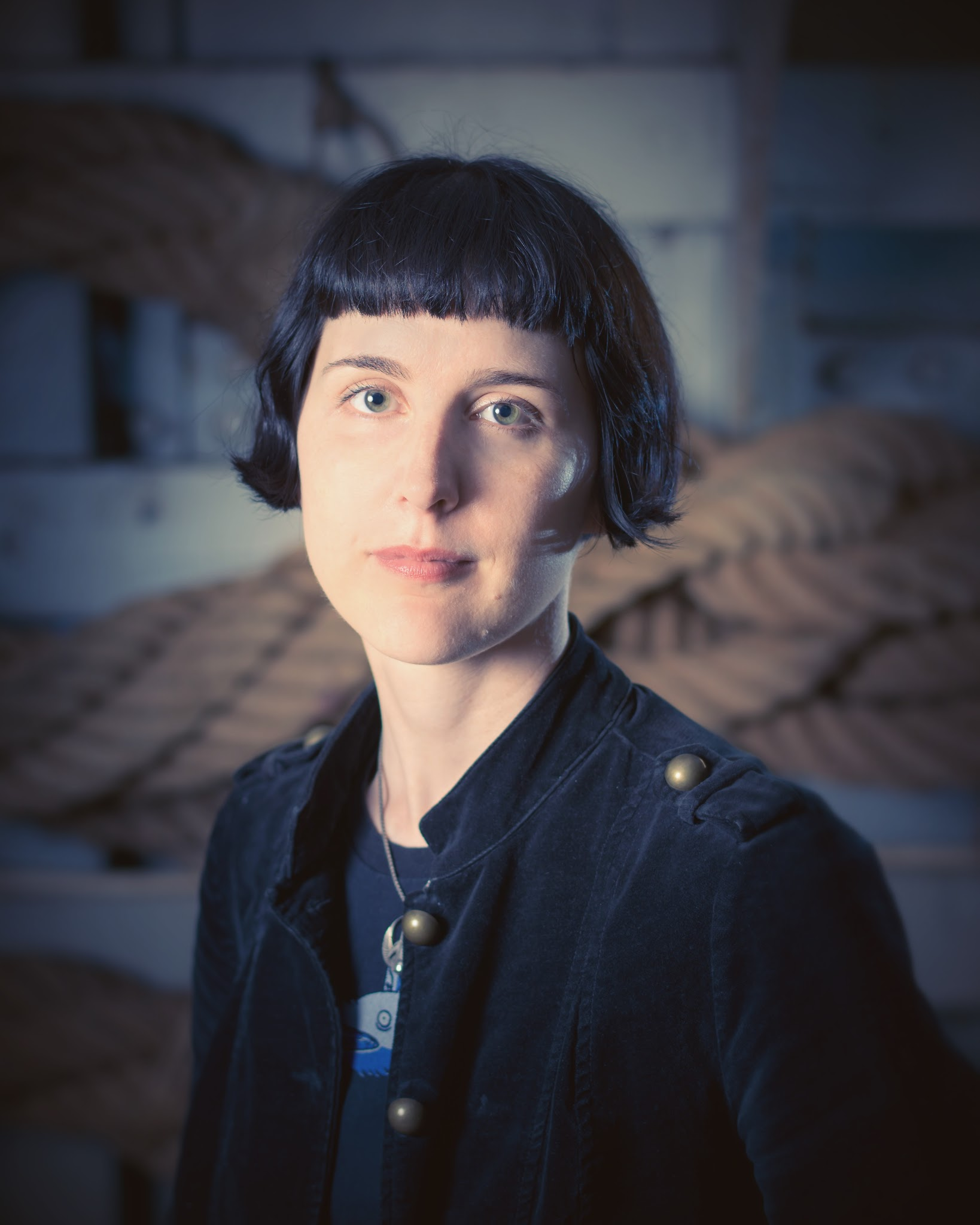
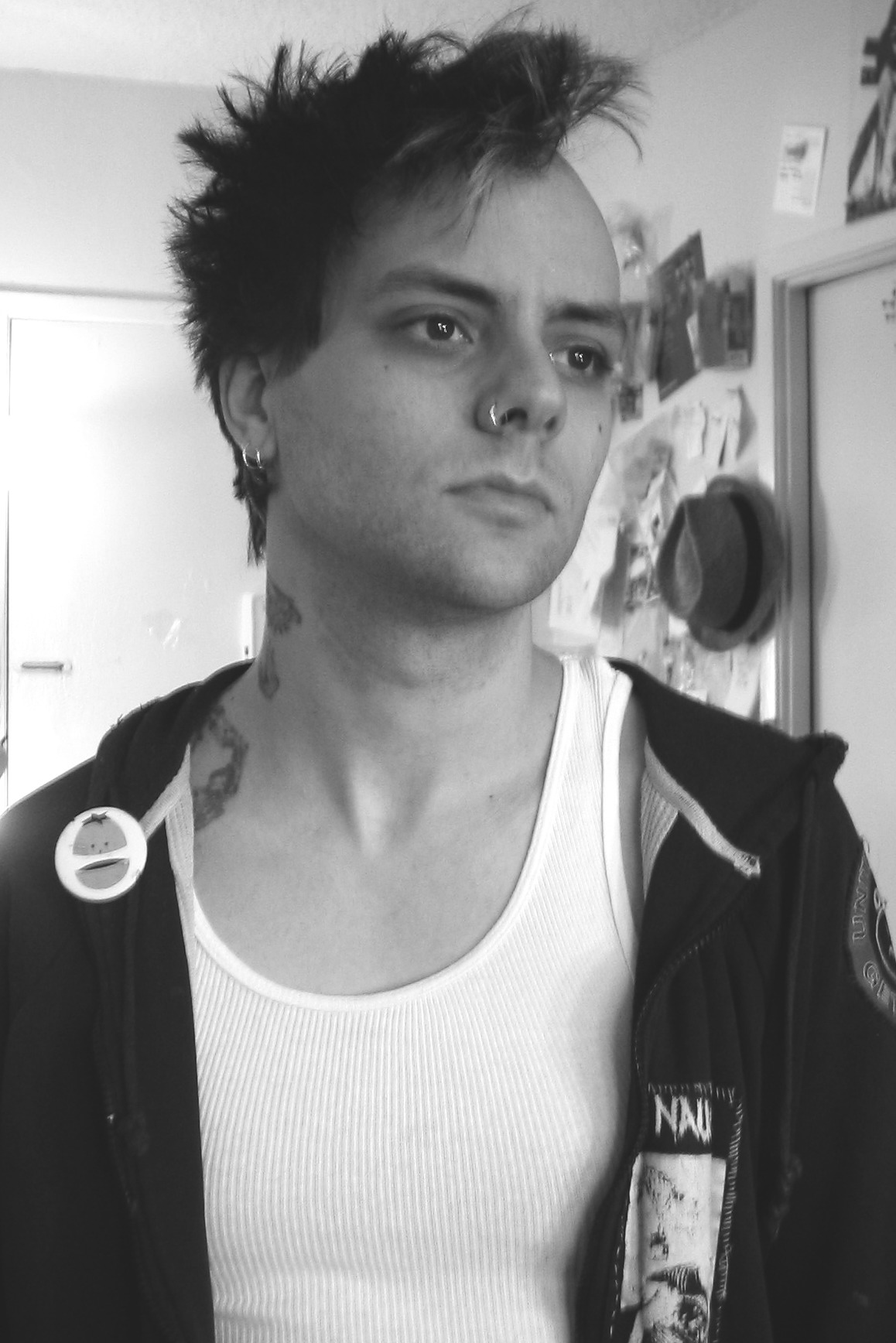
Karin Tidbeck (left) wrote Mage, and Sarah Horrocks and Zak Sabbath (pictured, right) wrote and illustrated Vampire.

Vampire and Mage were developed in a collaboration between White Wolf Entertainment and Fula Fisken following Paradox Interactive's purchase of White Wolf in 2016, and was the first time a Vampire: The Masquerade video game was released in over a decade; White Wolf also intended for the games to mark their start as a multimedia entertainment company. Vampire was written and illustrated by Sarah Horrocks and Zak Sabbath, and Mage was written by Karin Tidbeck; both games were directed by Martin Ericsson at White Wolf. The games were based on White Wolf's tabletop role-playing games Vampire: The Masquerade and Mage: The Ascension, and were inspired by Choose Your Own Adventure gamebooks. Fula Fisken developed them using the Unity game engine due to its multi-platform support, and because of how it allowed for a smooth production with a focus on the content rather than the technology.

Tidbeck was approached for Mage by Ericsson as he thought they would fit White Wolf's interactive fiction game concept, having known them since the 1990s, having previously worked with them on writing live action role-playing game projects, and having played tabletop role-playing games with them. Tidbeck got the idea for Mage from their time as a volunteer at a center for refugees in Malmö, and drew on their experience from that. The protagonist of Mage was written as pansexual and polyamorous, as Tidbeck likes to include LGBTQ portrayals in their works. In preparation for writing the game, Tidbeck read up on news articles to get a better understanding of the political background, and interviewed a Syrian family. As the game is based in the Mage: The Ascension setting, they additionally had to read the tabletop game's rule book, and learn and internalize its concepts. Working on an already established intellectual property was a challenge, as it meant having to stay faithful to the original, and being restrained in what they could and could not do, while also having to make something with their own flavor.

Writing a Choose Your Own Adventure-style story also brought challenges, as they unlike ordinary novels and short stories are non-linear, and involve keeping track of several variables and having to bring all possibilities together into the game's endings. Something Tidbeck wanted to avoid bringing over from that gamebook format was their complex rules and game mechanics, and to instead focus on the story, while embracing their freedom in what the player character can do. To plot out the story, they made use of post-it notes, which they then transcribed into the game engine Twine, where they wrote the story. Each section of the game was then sent to the game's producers for play testing and feedback; the tweaks Tidbeck had to do mostly involved adding minor choices for the player to make in addition to the bigger, more dramatic ones. Tidbeck was also involved in the game's music to an extent, offering feedback on music samples that were used when choosing the composer.

The games were published on February 15, 2017 by White Wolf Entertainment for Microsoft Windows, MacOS and Linux together as a set under the title World of Darkness Preludes: Vampire and Mage, and individually by Asmodee for Android and iOS. The standalone Vampire and the World of Darkness Preludes set stopped being offered for sale, however, following a series of allegations against Sabbath of sexual and emotional abuse, which Sabbath denied.

== Reception ==
Several publications found it exciting to see new World of Darkness video games after such a long time since the last one, despite how different they were from 2004's Vampire: The Masquerade – Bloodlines, and considered it a new start, wondering what World of Darkness Preludes could lead to in the future; Kotaku, although finding the games too short, wished for further entries using the same format, based on World of Darkness tabletop games such as Wraith: The Oblivion and Changeling: The Dreaming. The games were also well received by users upon release.

Video game publications enjoyed Vampire's art and presentation: how it helped in setting the right atmosphere for the story, and how the mobile messaging interface worked well with the mobile versions of the game. Kotaku also enjoyed the story's combination of modern technology with traditional horror, saying that one's text message conversations naturally would be "fucked up" after being turned into a vampire. Pocket Gamer, however, noted that the art, while "beautiful", sometimes was difficult to read, slowing down the pacing of the game as the player deciphers a picture. They also criticized the writing, calling it at times confusing, requiring re-reads of passages, and saying that the text message-style sentences often included lengthy run-on sentences that impacted the pacing, and at times grating text talk such as abbreviations, slang and misspellings.

TouchArcade and Kotaku appreciated Tidbeck's involvement in Mage, due to the authentic Swedish touch they could bring to the Swedish setting of the game, and their experience in the weird fiction genre; Pocket Gamer also enjoyed Mage's writing, preferring it over Vampire due to its higher stakes and the use of the player character's moral perspective. Kotaku appreciated the use of visual distortion effects in Mage to communicate the strange nature of Magick and its effect on the world.
