= Psychohistorical Crisis =

2001 novel by Donald Kingsbury

- First edition jacket art
- Author: Donald Kingsbury
- Cover artist: Donato Giancola
- Language: English
- Genre: Science fiction
- Publisher: Tor Books
- Publication date: December 2001
- Publication place: United States
- Media type: Print (hardback & paperback)
- Pages: 511 (first edition hardcover)
- ISBN: 0-312-86102-8 (first edition hardcover)
- OCLC: 47296021
- Dewey Decimal: 813/.54 21
- LC Class: PR9199.3.K44226 P77 2001
- Preceded by: The Moon Goddess and the Son

Psychohistorical Crisis is a science fiction novel by American-Canadian writer Donald Kingsbury, published by Tor Books in 2001. An expansion of his 1995 novella "Historical Crisis", it is a re-imagining of the world of Isaac Asimov's Foundation series, set after the establishment of the Second Empire. The book is neither officially authorized by Asimov's estate (as they had previously done with the Second Foundation Trilogy), nor is it intended to be recognized as part of his continuity.

Psychohistorical Crisis was the 2002 winner of the Prometheus Award.

== Story ==
Eron Osa is a Pscholar, one of the secret leaders behind the Second Empire of humanity. For a crime he cannot remember, he is sentenced to the removal of his "fam", his symbiotic computer mind. Eron embarks on a journey to find out who stole his memory, and why.

== Reviews ==
- Review by David Langford (2002) in Vector 221
- Review by Nigel Brown (2002) in Interzone, #178 April 2002
- Review by Peter Heck (2002) in Asimov's Science Fiction, June 2002
- Review by Graham Sleight (2002) in The New York Review of Science Fiction, June 2002
- Review by Russell Blackford (2002) in The New York Review of Science Fiction, September 2002
- Review by K. V. Bailey (2002) in Foundation, #86 Autumn 2002
- Review by A. M. Dellamonica [as by Alyx Dellamonica] (2002) in Locus, #492 January 2002, (2002)
- Review by John Clute (2003) in Scores: Reviews 1993 - 2003
- Review [French] by Éric Vial (2004) in Galaxies, #35
