= Celestial Matters =

1996 book by Richard Garfinkle

- First American edition cover
- Author: Richard Garfinkle
- Cover artist: Bob Eggleton
- Language: English
- Genre: Science fantasy, alternate history
- Publisher: Tor Books
- Publication date: 1996
- Publication place: United States
- Media type: Print (Hardcover & Paperback)
- Pages: 348 (Hardcover edition)
- ISBN: 978-0-312-85934-3
- OCLC: 33246093
- Dewey Decimal: 813/.54 20
- LC Class: PS3557.A71536 C4 1996

Celestial Matters is a science fantasy novel by American writer Richard Garfinkle, set in an alternate universe with different laws of physics. Published by Tor Books in 1996, it is a work of alternate history, as the physics of this world and its surrounding cosmos are based on the physics of Aristotle and ancient Chinese Taoist alchemy.

Celestial Matters won the 1997 Compton Crook Award for best first science fiction novel.

== Setting ==
In the world of Celestial Matters, Ptolemaic astronomy and Aristotelian physics are valid scientific models of the surrounding world and cosmos. The Earth lies at the center of the universe, surrounded by crystal spheres which hold each of the planets, the sun and the moon, all enclosed in the sphere of the fixed stars. Earthly matter, composed of the classical four elements of earth, air, fire, and water, naturally moves in straight lines. Heavenly matter naturally rises and moves in circles. This is the universe as understood by the ancient Greeks.

The science of the ancient Chinese also applies, but as the novel is told from the perspective of the Greeks, it is less well-understood. Xi, the Chinese notion of spirit and flow, can be manipulated to move objects and energy. The Chinese five elements of earth, metal, water, wood, and fire are transmuted one into the other. Part of the central theme of the book is the two systems' mutual misunderstanding and bafflement of each other.

In this world, the Delian League (Greeks) and Middle Kingdom (Chinese) have been fighting a war for nearly a thousand years, ever since the time of Alexander the Great when the warrior-culture of Sparta and the Athenian Akademe were fused into a half-world conquering force. Their technologies are locked together, however, and neither empire can gain the upper hand. Each side secretly despairs of its chances and has come to consider desperate measures.

== Plot summary ==
The story is narrated by Aias of Tyre, a scientist of the Delian League, who is preparing to embark on Project Sunthief as scientific commander. This project is an audacious and desperate mission to sail a spaceship carved out of a piece of the moon herself out through the spheres, to catch a piece of the sun and bring it back to earth to annihilate the Middler capital city. This, the league hopes, will finally end the war and give it victory.

The Middlers have been assassinating Delian generals and politicians, so Aias is assigned a bodyguard, Captain Yellow Hare of Sparta, a woman of Xeroki ancestry. Shortly after the launch of the moon-ship, Chandra's Tear, it becomes clear that there is a saboteur on board. Aias' old friend Ramonojon, a mathematician, has expressed doubts about the rightness of annihilating an entire city and is viewed with dark suspicion by Anaxamander, the heroic military commander of the project. Mihradarius, the fire scientist who has devised the sun-catching method, keeps his own counsel.

As sabotage, catastrophe, and exhilarating maneuvers overtake the voyage, Aias begins to wonder about the wisdom of the Delian strategy. Eventually he comes to understand the desperation of the Middle Kingdom, thanks to a Middler scientist stowaway, and they try to synthesize between them a way for the two world-spanning empires to resolve their differences. There remains a life-or-death race to earth on a crippled ship in the hope of bringing hope.

== See also ==
- Inne pieśni, a 2003 Polish novel with similar premises.
- "Sail On! Sail On!", a 1952 science fiction short story by Philip José Farmer with similar premises, albeit within a more humorous setting.
