= Other Songs =

Other Songs may refer to:

- Other Songs (album), 1997 album by Ron Sexsmith
- Other Songs (novel), 2003 novel by Jacek Dukaj
