= Brighter than Scale, Swifter than Flame =

2025 novella by Neon Yang

- Author: Neon Yang
- Language: English
- Genre: Fantasy, romance
- Publisher: Tordotcom
- Publication date: 6 May 2025
- Publication place: Singapore
- ISBN: 9781250357342

Brighter than Scale, Swifter than Flame is a 2025 fantasy romance novella by Neon Yang. It tells the story of Yeva, a knight and dragon slayer, who visits a kingdom where dragons are held sacred.

== Plot ==
A narrator tells the story of the legendary guildknight of Mithrandon. The narrator promises to tell the true story of the person behind the mask.

When Kunlin Yeva is thirteen, a dragon enters her home. Yeva confronts the dragon and protects her younger sister. During the confrontation, blue flames surround her. The dragon maims her hand, but she kills the beast with her father's sword. Recognizing that she has inherited his family's magic, Yeva's father sends her to apprentice as a guildknight in the city of Mithrandon.

In the capital, Yeva meets her cousin Emory. Over the following years, she becomes a guildknight. She refuses to remove her armor in public, lending her the moniker "the masked knight." Emory tells Yeva that the emperor has become interested in the neighboring kingdom of Quanbao, where dragons are worshipped instead of feared. It is rumored that a large storm dragon lives in Quanbao; Yeva is ordered to slay it.

Yeva meets Lady Sookhee, the king (Note: Women who rule Quanbao are known as kings, not queens.) of Quanbao. Sookhee suffers from a hereditary illness. Yeva learns that her own mother was once a confidant to Sookhee's mother, the previous king. Sookhee tells Yeva that dragons are sacred to Quanbao, but that they no longer live in the kingdom.

During the following months, Yeva and Sookhee become close. Yeva intermittently explores the caverns under Sookhee's palace, hoping to find evidence of dragons. The caverns are intermittently closed to visitors, frustrating Yeva's search. Yeva and Sookhee attend a festival together. They later become lovers.

Yeva recognizes a pattern between Sookhee's blood illness and the closure of the caverns. She enters the caverns during a forbidden period. She discovers a dragon scale. Yeva sends a letter to Emory, then plans to confront Sookhee.

When Yeva arrives in Sookhee's quarters, the king passes out from her illness. When she recovers, Sookhee brings Yeva below the palace. They visit a mausoleum filled with dragons' relics. Sookhee reveals that she knows of the existence of the creature who dropped the scale, calling her the last of her kind. Sookhee asks Yeva to keep the secret, but Yeva has already sent a letter to Emory.

Emory and other knights from Mithrandon arrive at the palace. Emory forces his way into the caverns. Yeva is torn between her loyalty to her Empire and to Sookhee, but ultimately accompanies him. In the caverns, they encounter a storm dragon. Yeva sees a scar on its body, recognizing the dragon as Lady Sookhee. Emory fires his musket, causing the cave's ceiling to collapse.

The dragon transforms into Lady Sookhee. Sookhee tells Yeva the truth about her blood sickness: once per month, the king transforms into a dragon. Yeva rejects the Empire and pledges her loyalty to Sookhee. Emory arrives to confront them. Yeva accuses him of caring more about the Empire than about her. Emory tells Yeva that he will be killed if he returns home empty-handed. Sookhee offers him the skull of her father, a dragon shapeshifter who was killed by knights of Mithrandon years ago.

Yeva disavows her role as a knight of Mithrandon. Emory and his knights return to their own nation, claiming that Yeva was killed during the fight with the dragon. Emory forges a new trade agreement with Quanbao. Yeva returns to her childhood home for the first time since leaving for Mithrandon, hoping to reunite with her family.

== Major themes ==
Alexandra Pierce writes that masks and identity are a key thematic element in the story. Fictional characters such as the Mandalorian and many superheroes use masks to conceal their identities; Yeva's propensity to wear a mask follows this pattern. Yeva has been compelled to become a guildknight and has also compelled herself to follow their rules. This is represented by her guildknight mask and her desire never to remove her uniform.

== Reception and awards ==
Publishers Weekly called the book "a brisk and satisfying tale full of love, hope, and yearning."

Alexandra Pierce of Locus praised the novella's diversity, including its use of a female knight, its Asian-inspired setting which lends ethnic diversity, and its queer representation. Pierce also enjoyed the slower pace of the story, which allows the relationship between Yeva and Lady Sookhee to develop realistically.

Writing for Reactor, Vanessa Armstrong praised Yang's prose, likening it to a fairy tale. Armstrong felt that the most moving part of the story was Yeva's internal identity struggle, which would resonate with many readers. The review praised the hopeful tone of the ending, with Armstrong commenting that she would enjoy seeing a sequel or another work set in the same world.
