= Syne Mitchell =

American novelist (born 1970)

- Born: 1970 (age 55–56); Jackson, Mississippi, U.S.
- Occupation: Novelist
- Spouse: Eric S. Nylund (m. 1997; div. 2026)
- Writing career
- Genre: Science fiction
- Notable awards: Compton Crook Award - 2001
- Website: www.synemitchell.com

Syne Mitchell (born 1970 in Jackson, Mississippi) is an American novelist in the science fiction genre. She has a bachelor's degree in business administration and master's degree in physics. She lives in Seattle, Washington. Her first science fiction novel was Murphy’s Gambit which won the Compton Crook Award in 2001. Followed by science fiction novels Technogenesis in 2001, The Changeling Plague in 2003, End in Fire in 2005 and the first installment of the Deathless series, called The Last Mortal Man in 2006.

She wrote a how-to book, Inventive Weaving on a Little Loom: Discover the Full Potential of the Rigid-Heddle Loom, for Beginners and Beyond in 2015

Working at Google, Mitchell was part of a team that produced explainer comics: "Smooth Sailing with Kubernetes" (2018) and "Learning Machine Learning" (2019)

Mitchell has also published articles, short stories, an online magazine for handweavers (WeaveZine), and produced a monthly podcast (WeaveCast).

She has worked as a technical writer at Microsoft, Amazon, and Google.

== Awards ==
Winner of the 2001 Compton Crook Award for Murphy's Gambit.

== Works ==
- Murphy's Gambit (2000)
- Technogenesis (2001)
- The Changeling Plague (2003)
- End in Fire (2005)
- The Deathless series
  - The Last Mortal Man (2006)
- Inventive Weaving (2015)

Mitchell's short fiction:

- "After the Nuclear War", American Collegiate Poets, International Publications, 1985
- "Tiger's Eye", in Sword and Sorceress IX, DAW, 1992, edited by Marion Zimmer Bradley
- "Amber", in Sword and Sorceress XII, DAW, 1995, edited by Marion Zimmer Bradley
- "Double Blind", Sword and Sorceress XIII, DAW, 1996, edited by Marion Zimmer Bradley
- "New Leaves", Marion Zimmer Bradley's Fantasy Magazine #32, The Marion Zimmer Bradley Living Trust, 1996
- "Devil’s Advocate", Writers of the Future XII, Bridge Publications, Inc., 1996
- "Silver Bands", Sword and Sorceress XIV, 1997, DAW, edited by Bradley & Holmen
- "Gratuities", Talebones #6 Fairwood Press 1997
- "Economy of Emotion", Cabaret, Vol.5, Issue 9, LPI Pub Inc, 1999
- "Partial Birth", Talebones #14, Fairwood Press, 1999
- "Rehabilitation", Marion Zimmer Bradley's Fantasy Worlds, Marion Zimmer Bradley Literary Works Trust 1998
- "Stately's Pleasure Dome", Imagination Fully Dilated: Science Fiction: Fairwood Press, 2003
- "Oscar Night 2054", Nature, 21 April 2005
- "The Last Mortal Man", Elemental, Tor 2006

Mitchell's non-fiction articles:

- “Using Modern Music in Magic”, Circle Magazine, Issue 82, Circle Sanctuary, 2001
- “A Spindle Pretty Enough to Wear”, Spin-Off, Winter 2002, pages 50–53)
- “Using Today’s Music in Tomorrow’s Ritual”, Widdershins, Vol. 9, Issue 6, Silver Moon Productions, 2003
- “Seattle’s Science Fiction Museum”, Northwest Baby & Child, Baby Diaper Service, 2004
- “A Talk Show for Weavers”, Handwoven, Nov/Dec 2006, page 26
- “Lyle Brunckhorst: Evolution of a Craftsman”, Knife World, Vol. 32 No. 5, Knife World Publications, 2006
- “Elegant Bookmarks: Miniature Overshot and Fine Threads”, Handwoven, May/April 2007, pages 36–38
- “A Loom With a View”, Handwoven, May/April 2007, page 96
- “WeaveCast: A Podcast for Handweavers”, Shuttle, Spindle, and Dyepot, 2007
- “New Media, the What, Why, and How?”, Spinning and Weaving Association Newsletter, 2007
- "Color Blending with Two Strands", Knitty, Fall 2008
- “Completing the Circuit: Laura MacCary Makes Weaving Interactive,” CRAFT: vol. 08, August 2008, pages 56–57
- "Overdying to Coordinate Yarns", WeaveZine, November 30, 2008
- "Potholder Loom: Basics and Beyond", WeaveZine, May 8, 2009
- "What’s WIF Got to Do With It?", WeaveZine, November 30, 2008
- "Painted-Skein Warps", WeaveZine, February 14, 2008
- "Pacific Northwest Kente", WeaveZine, September 14, 2008
- "Designing Your Own Projects", WeaveZine, May 14, 2008
- "Spa Wash Cloth on a Rigid Heddle Loom", WeaveZine, August 2009
- “Stash-busting Scarves”, Handwoven, Nov/Dec 2009, page 24-26
- "Arghh! I’m Working!", the AntiCraft, Imbolc 2009
- “Studio by IKEA”, Handwoven, Nov/Dec 2009, page 26
- "Double-Heddle Bookmarks", WeaveZine, September 7, 2009
- "Spa Wash Cloth on a Rigid-Heddle Loom", WeaveZine, August 7, 2009
- “Space Invaders Cloth”, Complex Weavers Journal, June 2010, pages 4–5
- "Extruded String Weaving", WeaveZine, April 1, 2010
- “Woven Shibori on a Rigid-Heddle Loom”, The Journal of Spinners, Weavers and Dyers, 2011
- “Frankenhood”, What Would Madame Defarge Knit?, Cooperative Press, 2011

Columns From 2008 to 2011, Mitchell was a columnist for Handwoven Magazine, writing about online resources for handweavers.

- “Weaving the Web: YouTube”, Handwoven, Sept/Oct 2008, page 9
- “Weaving the Web: Social Networking”, Handwoven, Nov/Dec 2008, page 9
- “Weaving the Web: Blog Your Weaving” (Jan/Feb 2009, page 8)
- “Weaving the Web: Selling Online” (March/April 2009, page 9)
- “Weaving the Web: Color Tools” (May/June, 2009)
- “Weaving the Web: Weavolution” (Sept/Oct 2009, page 9)
- “Weaving the Web: How Tweet It Is!” (Nov/Dec 2009, page 9)
- “Weaving the Web: SEO for Weavers” (Jan/Feb 2010, page 8)
- “Weaving the Web: Weaving the World a Better Place” (March/April 2010, page 8)
- “Weaving the Web: Handweaving.net” (May/June 2010, page 8)
- “Weaving the Web: Kickstart a Project” (Sept/Oct 2010, page 9)
- “Weaving the Web: Online Study Groups” (Nov/Dec 2010, page 9)
- “Weaving the Web: Facebook” (Jan/Feb 2011, page 9)
- “Weaving the Web: eTextiles” (2011)

== See also ==
- Eric S. Nylund
