= Paul Melko =

American science fiction writer (born 1968)

- Born: May 22, 1968 (age 58)
- Occupation: Writer
- Writing career
- Genre: Science fiction
- Website: www.paulmelko.com

Paul Melko (born May 22, 1968) is an American science fiction writer whose work has appeared in Realms of Fantasy, Asimov's Science Fiction, Strange Horizons, and Live Without a Net.

His first professional story appeared in Realms of Fantasy in 2002. His first novel, Singularity's Ring, appeared from Tor Books in February 2008. He lives near Columbus, Ohio.

== Bibliography ==
- Singularity's Ring (2008) novel ISBN 0-7653-1777-X
- Ten Sigmas & Other Unlikelihoods (2008) collection ISBN 0-9789078-6-8
- The Walls of the Universe (2009) novel ISBN 0-7653-1997-7
- Broken Universe (2012) novel, sequel to "The Walls of the Universe" ISBN 0-7653-2914-X

== Awards and nominations ==
- 2009: Won the Locus Award for Best First Novel for the novel Singularity's Ring
- 2009: Won the Compton Crook Award for the novel Singularity's Ring
- 2006: Nominated for Hugo Award for Best Novella, Nebula Award for Best Novella, and Theodore Sturgeon Memorial Award for "The Walls of the Universe" (Asimov's Science Fiction, April/May 2006)
- 2006: Won the Asimov's Readers Poll Award for "The Walls of the Universe" (Asimov's Science Fiction, April/May 2006)
