= Singularity's Ring =

2008 science fiction novel by Paul Melko

- First hardcover edition
- Author: Paul Melko
- Language: English
- Genre: Science fiction
- Publisher: Tor Books
- Publication date: February 5, 2008
- Publication place: United States
- Media type: Print (Hardback)
- Pages: 320 pp. (Hardback 1st edition)
- ISBN: 978-0-7653-1777-3
- OCLC: 171152643

Singularity's Ring is the debut science fiction book by Paul Melko. The novel was published on February 5, 2008 by Tor Books.

== Plot ==
The story is set in a future after a singularity event, which caused the bulk of humanity to disappear. The focus of this event was a huge space station which rings the Earth, and which remains uninhabited after the singularity. Humans who remained on Earth have maintained an industrial technological base, and are working to re-enter space. The majority of humans are now genetically engineered to form pods, groups of 2 to 5 individuals with the ability to form an emergent personality from those individuals.

The story follows a young pod named Apollo Papadopulos who is training to become the captain of a new starship which is to be launched soon. Apollo Papadopulos is composed of five teenagers; Strom, Meda, Quant, Manuel and Moira. The story moves between the points of view of each of these individuals, and that of Apollo Papadopulos itself.

== Awards ==
The novel was awarded the Compton Crook Award for 2009 by the Baltimore Science Fiction Society as well as the Locus Award for Best First Novel in the same year.

== Publication history ==
- 2008, United States, Tor Books ISBN 978-0-7653-1777-3, Pub date February 2008, Hardcover
- 2009, United States, Tor Science Fiction ISBN 978-0-7653-5702-1, Pub date April 2008, Paperback
