= The Genesis of Misery =

2022 science fiction novel by Neon Yang

- Author: Neon Yang
- Language: English
- Series: The Nullvoid Chronicles
- Release number: 1
- Genre: Science fiction; space opera
- Publisher: Tor Books
- Publication date: 27 Sep 2022
- Pages: 432
- ISBN: 978-1-250-78897-9

The Genesis of Misery is a 2022 science fiction novel by Neon Yang. It is the author's first full-length novel and is the first work in the planned trilogy The Nullvoid Chronicles. It has been described as a space opera retelling of the story of Joan of Arc.

== Plot summary ==
In a frame story, a human man listens to an angel narrate the story of Misery Nomaki. Hundreds of years ago, eight explorers discovered holystone. They heard the voice of the Larex Forge, the Demiurge, who taught them how to use the stone. Six of these Messiahs founded the Church of the Forge; two of them searched for scientific explanations rather than religious ones. These two became the ancestors of the Heretics, and a centuries-long war began.

Misery (she/they) is a resident of the rural planet of Rootsdown and a citizen of the Empire of the Faithful. She has the ability to use holystone despite not being a saint; Misery suspects she has voidmadness. She begins seeing visions of an angel named Ruin. She is arrested; Misery lies and claims to be the Ninth Messiah. Surprisingly, the Duke of Apis believes her and sends her to the Imperial Capital.

Misery arrives at the capital and is shocked by its corruption. There is conflict between the Throne and the Church of the Forge, led by Archbishop Storm Imogen. She is taken to the Emperor's audience hall. The Emperor's sister Lee Alodia Lightning hears Misery's petition. Misery publicly claims the title of Ninth Messiah and destroys the audience hall, killing hundreds of onlookers. Misery, the Duke, and Alodia are sentenced to death.

Misery is transported to Angelsteeth base, where she uses her powers to fight off an attack by Heretics. General Tsung comes to believe she is the Messiah and trains her to become a mech pilot. She joins a team of fighters including Alodia, Captain Sunyata Diamond, and Spider. Misery's delusions deepen; she has recurrent dreams of a weeping saint and of a man named Jericho.

After a series of seeming miracles from the Forge, including the discovery of a new archangel-class mech, Misery comes to believe that she is actually the Messiah. Misery, Spider, and Lightning[a] make love. Heretics attack the base again, but they are easily destroyed by Misery's archangel mech. In a dream, Jericho tries to convince Misery that killing Heretics is wrong. She rejects him as a liar. The Emperor considers surrendering to the Heretics; however, Church leadership and General Tsung believe that unilateral action could turn the tide of the war effort. Monkglass Station is under siege. The Heretic commander is Esse Temple, who killed many of Captain Diamond's and Spider's crewmates in a previous engagement. Misery learns that the weeping saint from her dreams is Lady Storm Mirelle, the commander of Monkglass Station and the Archbishop's twin sister. She also learns that Jericho is a Heretic prisoner who is held at Angelsteeth. Jericho provides information about how to break the siege. He also claims that Misery is not the Messiah and is actually a telepath, explaining their shared dreams and providing a scientific explanation for her sudden rise to power. Misery is furious about these claims.

Misery leads the attack on Monkglass. She finds that Storm Mirelle has been working with both the Heretics and the Throne in order to secure a permanent peace treaty. Captain Diamond sacrifices herself to destroy many of the Heretics. Temple and Storm Mirelle both survive. Misery is taken into the Throne's custody; she and Jericho are both turned over to the Heretics. The angel finishes narrating this tale to the human man; these characters are shown to be Ruin and Jericho. Jericho implies that Ruin is an AI, that the mechs are alien technology rather than divine gifts, and that the Heretics plan to study Misery further.

== Major themes ==
According to Zhui Ning Chang of Strange Horizons, the novel's main narrative focus is an exploration and inversion of the Chosen One trope. At the beginning of the novel, Misery lies in order to convince people that she is the Messiah. Her journey shows what the "mantle of saviour can do to an individual" as it warps Misery's sense of self.

== Style ==
Each character is introduced with personal pronouns as a matter of fact. The neopronoun "zie" is used to refer to Misery when she melds with the archangel mech.

== Reception ==
Publishers Weekly gave the novel a starred review, calling it "a triumph" and praising its "simultaneous embrace and inversion of Chosen One narratives". Writing for Locus, Paul Di Filippo praised the use of the frame story as a "smart and efficient tactic". He called the entire work "a rousing postmodern space opera". Writing for Tor.com, Martin Cahill called the novel "a thrilling, inventive, enthralling book" and particularly praised Misery's character development. Olivia Ho of the Straits Times gave the novel four out of five stars.

A review in Strange Horizons called the novel "weird and wild" and "stylistically adventurous". The review praised the incorporation of mecha, a concept usually reserved for anime and manga. The reviewer also enjoyed the "chaotic complexity" of Misery's character development, as well as the themes of queerness, fanaticism, and religion. The same review critiqued the somewhat repetitive interludes as well as the lack of worldbuilding regarding the "Faithful and the Heretics' culture, politics, and wider power structures", feeling that this weakened Lee Alodia Lightning's characterization.

Awards and honors
| Year | Award | Category | Result | Ref. |
|---|---|---|---|---|
| 2022 | Goodreads Choice Award | Science Fiction | Finalist | |
| 2023 | Compton Crook Award | — | Finalist | |
| 2023 | Locus Award | First Novel | Finalist | |
