= Other Songs (novel) =

2003 novel by Jacek Dukaj

Inne pieśni
- Polish edition cover.
- Author: Jacek Dukaj
- Original title: Inne pieśni
- Translator: not translated
- Cover artist: Tomasz Bagiński
- Language: Polish
- Genre: Fantasy/Science fiction novel
- Publisher: Wydawnictwo Literackie
- Publication date: 2003
- Publication place: Poland
- Pages: 650
- ISBN: 83-08-03481-0
- OCLC: 54357458
- LC Class: PG7163.U4 I56 2003

Inne pieśni (Other Songs) is a novel written in 2003 by Jacek Dukaj, Polish science fiction writer. It was published in Poland by Wydawnictwo Literackie. The novel is a mixture of fantasy, alternate history and science fiction, and has been described as belonging to the genre of philosophical fiction as well.

The novel was well received by reviewers and critics, who commented on its original theme - an alternate Earth where the laws of physics, and philosophy, are different from that of ours. The novel received the prime Polish award for sci-fi literature, Janusz A. Zajdel Award, in 2003.

The book was translated to Russian (2014) and Bulgarian (2015).

== Universe ==
The universe of the book is similar to ours with one major exception: instead of laws of physics as known to us, the universe is ruled by Aristotle's metaphysics, and to a lesser extent by Hegelian philosophy. There are no atoms or other particles, just five elements. All Matter is composed of those five elements, mixed in proportions determined by the Form. Every Substance is fulfilling its ideal Form, morphe, which "exists" separately from the Matter, hile, but appears only in Substance. There's no evolution in nature. Nature is teleological and has a purpose. The Sun and all the planets are circling Earth, and they move not in vacuum but in aether. Diseases are the signs of mind's insanity, the weakness of Form.

Forms determine Matters, and human will can change Forms. Thus, the human mind is able to shape reality in an indirect way, to some degree, and the most powerful minds have a large area effect — their anthos (auras, fields of influence) can affect entire lands. The Earth is divided into dozens of dominions, each under the pressure of Form of kratistos (man) or kratista (woman): individuals having the most powerful Forms; their anthos influences culture, language, law of whole nations, even biology of animals and plants there. Having entered the domain of kratistos, one gradually finds it more and more natural to behave like him, to look like him, to think like him — to be him. People with a weaker form can be easily dominated by those with a more powerful Form. In the aura of a despot everyone is a little more egoistic and harsh; in the aura of a hedonist everyone is a little prettier and sensual. Travelers will be affected by the anthos, acquiring attributes of the land they enter, up to and including its language. People can try to train their anthos, and there are specializations of personal auras — for example in the presence of ares — a natural born warrior — everything is a deadly weapon and an accidental punch can be a devastating blow.

== Plot introduction ==
Twelve centuries have passed since the fall of Rome; fewer since the death of Kristos (Christ). Hieronim Berbelek was once a powerful strategos (a natural born leader whose form makes other people listen to him or her), but when he was defeated by one of the kratistoses, known as the Warlock, his Form and spirit were broken, reduced to those of a lowly merchant, a sad, small man, easily molded by others with stronger Forms. However, a chain of events sets him off on a journey — first to Africa, and later into many new lands, from the depths of Warlock's domain, through the fabled Library of Alexandria and mysterious flying city, to the Moon colony, and on this journey he may have a chance of regaining his Form…

== Influence and interpretation ==
Dukaj's primary influence have been the philosophical concepts of Aristotle, such as his conjectures on Form and Matter. Greek vocabulary, or vocabulary inspired by Greek language, is heavily used in the work. The work is also heavily influenced by the ideas of Witold Gombrowicz's Ferdydurke.

Coupled with his experiences in science fiction, the resulting book is hard to put into any normal genre, leading many to describe it as a kind of 'philosophical fiction'. Philosophical, because Dukaj introduces an overwhelming array of philosophical concepts, but also fiction: the book has no essays or lengthy monologues, it is full of action and colorful characters.

Aleksandra Klęczar noted that the book deals with the concept of otherness, as while it is set in the somewhat recognizable history, it portrays a world functioning according to a different set of physical and philosophical rules than ours. Among the influences, she counted classic science fiction form of Jules Verne, comparing his style to Dukaj's, particularly in the context of both descriptions and character's dialogues, focused on describing the fantastical world present. Other influences she noted, particularly in the context of the exploration and adventure subplot, were those of Henryk Sienkiewicz and Joseph Conrad. She also noted that the novel is closer to fantasy genre than science fiction.

== Reception ==
The novel received the prime Polish award for sci-fi literature, Janusz A. Zajdel Award, in 2003, as well as the Sfinks Award for that year. It also received a special mention at the Poznański Przegląd Nowości Wydawniczych. It was nominated for Paszport Polityki and Nautilus Award.

Reviewing the book for Esensja in 2003, Eryk Remiezowicz called it the most refined work of Dukaj's to date. He called it a "perfect puzzle", with every mystery having a logical solution, and every hint eventually fitting into the wider picture. He praised the world building, calling it a seamless creation with no plot holes. Also that year, Wojciech Orliński reviewed it for the Gazeta Wyborcza newspaper. Orliński praised Dukaj for his novel ideas, for vivid description of the portrayed world, and described the main character as the most interesting protagonist created up to this point by Dukaj. He concluded that this is the best work Dukaj has written so far.

Klęczar in 2004 called the work a proof that Dukaj is the most imaginative of contemporary Polish writers when it comes to world building, and in the context of originality and profundity of the new ideas, compared this book to Le Guin's Left Hand of Darkness. She concluded that the work is exemplary and deserves to be recognized as a classic of Polish literature.

Jarek Rusak, who reviewed it for Poltergeist portal in 2013, described the book as challenging, but worth the effort, and praised the author's for the work's originality.

== See also ==
- Celestial Matters
- "Sail On! Sail On!"
