= Patricia Bray =

American romance and fantasy writer

- Education: Master's in IT
- Known for: Romance and Fantasy Fiction
- Notable work: Devlin's Luck
- Website: http://www.patriciabray.com/

Patricia Bray is an American romance and fantasy novelist.

== Biography ==
Bray lives in New England where she works in IT and has a master's degree in Information Technology. She began by writing historical romances set in Regency England. She then began a new series of stories which were more epic fantasy in style and scale. Her books have been translated into multiple languages including Russian, German, Portuguese and Hebrew. Her novel Devlin's Luck won the Compton Crook Award in 2003. Bray also works as an editor, having edited a number of anthologies.

== Bibliography ==
- A London Season (1997)
- An Unlikely Alliance (1998)
- Lord Freddie's First Love (1999)
- The Irish Earl (2000)
- A Most Suitable Duchess (2001)
- The Wrong Mr. Wright (2002)

=== Sword of Change ===
- Devlin's Luck (2002)
- Devlin's Honor (2003)
- Devlin's Justice (2004)

=== Chronicles of Josan ===
- The First Betrayal (2006)
- The Sea Change (2007)
- The Final Sacrifice (2008)

=== Collection ===
- Bewitching Kittens (1998) (with Janice Bennett and Cathleen Clare)

=== As editor ===
- After Hours (2011) (with Joshua Palmatier)
- The Modern Fae's Guide to Surviving Humanity (2012) (with Joshua Palmatier)
- Clockwork Universe: Steampunk vs Aliens (2014) (with Joshua Palmatier)
- Temporally Out of Order (2015) (with Joshua Palmatier)
- Alien Artifacts (2016) (with Joshua Palmatier)
- Were- (2016) (with Joshua Palmatier)
- All Hail Our Robot Conquerors! (2017) (with Joshua Palmatier)
- Second Round (2018) (with Joshua Palmatier)
- Portals (2019) (with S C Butler)
