= Robert R. Chase =

American science fiction writer (1948–2025)

Robert Reynolds Chase
- Born: August 30, 1948; Attleboro, Massachusetts, U.S.
- Died: October 20, 2025 (aged 77); Greenbelt, Maryland, U.S.
- Education: Dartmouth College (BA, international relations); Duke University School of Law (JD,law)
- Occupations: Writer; Reviewer
- Writing career
- Genre: Science fiction

Robert Reynolds Chase (August 30, 1948 – October 20, 2025) was an American writer of science fiction. He was the chief counsel of the U.S. Army Research Laboratory in Silver Spring, Maryland.

== Early life and education ==
Born on August 30, 1948, in Attleboro, Massachusetts, Chase earned a Bachelor of Arts degree in international relations from Dartmouth College, located in Hanover, New Hampshire. He then earned a Juris Doctor from Duke University School of Law, located in Durham, North Carolina.

== Writing career ==
Chase's first published story, "Seven Scenes from the Ultimate Monster Movie", appeared in the July 1984 issue of Analog. He followed this with multiple additional stories, primarily in the magazines Analog and Asimov's Science Fiction, and three novels, starting with The Game of Fox and Lion, published by Ballantine Books in 1986.

The Game of Fox and Lion was a finalist for the Compton Crook Award for best first novel in 1987, and his short stories have been nominated for the Theodore Sturgeon Memorial Award, the Locus Award, the Analog Readers Poll, and the Asimov's Reader Poll.

== Death ==
Chase died in Silver Spring, Maryland, on October 20, 2025, at the age of 77.

== Bibliography ==
- Chase, Robert R. (1986). The Game of Fox and Lion. Ballantine Books. ISBN 9780345333841.
- Chase, Robert R. (1989). Shapers. Ballantine Books. ISBN 0345359453.
- Chase, Robert R. (1991). Crucible. Ballantine Books. ISBN 0345366565.
