= Courtship Rite =

1982 novel by Donald Kingsbury

- Cover of first hardcover edition
- Author: Donald Kingsbury
- Language: English
- Genre: Science fiction novel
- Publisher: Timescape/Simon & Schuster
- Publication date: 1982
- Publication place: United States
- Media type: Print (hardback & paperback)
- Pages: 464
- ISBN: 0-671-44033-0 (hc)
- OCLC: 8114700
- Dewey Decimal: 813/.54 19
- LC Class: PS3561.I487 C6 1982

Courtship Rite is a science fiction novel by Canadian writer Donald Kingsbury, originally serialized in Analog magazine in 1982. The book is set in the same universe as some of Kingsbury's other stories, such as "Shipwright" (1978) and the unpublished The Finger Pointing Solward.

In the UK, the novel was entitled Geta, and in France, Parade nuptiale.

Courtship Rite was the first winner of the Compton Crook Award for best first novel, was nominated for the Hugo Award for Best Novel in 1983 and won the 2016 Prometheus Hall of Fame Award.

== Setting ==
=== Geta ===
Geta is a harsh planet settled by humanity centuries before the novel begins. The planet has one large satellite, Scowlmoon; the two are in a mutual tidal lock, so the moon is only visible from half the planet. The planet's day is about half as long as Earth's. Geta is much drier than Earth, with eleven separate bodies of water large enough to be called seas; most of the land area is desert.

The Njarae Sea, the largest, is a narrow body extending around a quarter of the planet's circumference from northeast to southwest. Much of the story takes place in lands along the east coast of the Njarae. Terraforming was never, or very minimally, initiated on the planet's biosphere, leaving it very inhospitable to the descendants of the original settlers, who have become mythic, God-like creatures to its denizens.

Apparently the only Earth-life on Geta are humans, bees, and the "Eight Sacred Plants", including wheat, soybeans, barley, and potatoes. Native, "profane" life includes plants, a wide variety of sea-creatures and "insects", but no large land-animals. Each has a different biochemistry, so each is largely toxic to the other. Parts of certain profane species can be eaten if prepared correctly. As a result, food is a commodity that is very precious on Geta, and the only source of meat is humans themselves. Cannibalism has insinuated itself into the very fabric of social and religious life. On the other hand, humans are not at risk of infection from native bacteria, and seem not to have brought any pathogens with them.

The planet seems to have been settled centuries before the time of the story by a small group, possibly not by choice. Apparently, they made little use of printed materials that could be read in a world without advanced technology. Most knowledge of history and the larger universe was therefore lost, the remainder preserved by oral tradition in "Chants" and stories. The settlers' ship remains in orbit, but its nature has been forgotten; it is generally referred to as "God". The Horse survives only as a piece in chess, named for a "mythical sidestepping insect".

Courtship Rite is set in a time of rapidly advancing technology. The Getans are past masters of biology and genetics, capable of modifying organisms gene by gene. Apparently this knowledge was maintained from the time of landing, being necessary for survival. They also make use of steam engines and electricity, but are handicapped by an apparent lack of fossil fuels to smelt metals and provide power. They have sailing ships on the seas, and sailplanes, but no powered aircraft. As a consequence, few Getans travel far from home; a few have become famous by walking all the way around the world. At the beginning of the story, one clan, the Kaiel, has developed radio, and are exploiting the advantage of communicating much faster than their rivals. They also develop bicycles and other pedal-powered vehicles using light, metal-spoked wheels. They have also learned how to extract information from a "Frozen Voice of God"—an optical data-storage crystal left over from the original settlers.

Socially and politically, Geta has no nation-states. The "priest clans" have precedence, governing territories and the resident members of the underclans. In particular, they have the power of deciding, during times of famine, who must make the ultimate "Contribution to the Race": All individuals are rated in various ways on their "kalothi", or fitness to survive. When the need arises, those lowest on the list are required to perform "Ritual Suicide". The ordinary clans have generally evolved into differing niches based on some attribute or inclination of their founders. For instance, the Ivieth specialize in transportation and haulage duties. "Before puberty an Ivieth hauled his load or was walked to death and eaten." The o'Tghalie have an ability to perform complex mathematical problems.

== Plot introduction ==
The novel details the attempts of two of the priest-clans, the Kaiel and the Mnankrei, to expand into territory controlled by the Stgal. Ultimately, all the priest clans are trying to attain dominance of the planet through the use of new technology, propaganda, treachery, and "war", a new concept in this world. Previously, killing was done merely in order to provide food.

Jo Walton remarked that Courtship Rite "is about a distant generation of colonists on a planet with no usable animals. This is the book with everything, where everything includes cannibalism, polyamory, evolution and getting tattoos so your skin will make more interesting leather when you're dead."

== Reception ==
John Clute, although troubled by its didactic libertarianism and social Darwinism as well as the way Kingsbury "rigs his Getan society" to establish his political ideas, concluded that "the book is a considerable accomplishment, that it's a feast (of the imagination) and great fun while it lasted, within its covers.

Dave Langford reviewed Geta for White Dwarf #56, and stated that "Kingsbury throws you in at the deep end, to flounder for several chapters in complex Getan nomenclature, society and thought. Definitely worth it, though."

David Dunham reviewed Courtship Rite for Different Worlds magazine and stated that

One of the strengths of Courtship Rite is occasionally a weakness: there's too much here to fully explain. I'd love to know just what the Mnankrei Time Wizards are, for example. But any faults are trivial compared to the characterizations, the plot, the detail (the chapter quotations are almost all from Cetans sources). Courtship Rite is an outstanding book, the best I've read in the last twelve months.

== See also ==
- Child cannibalism
