= T. C. McCarthy =

American science fiction author

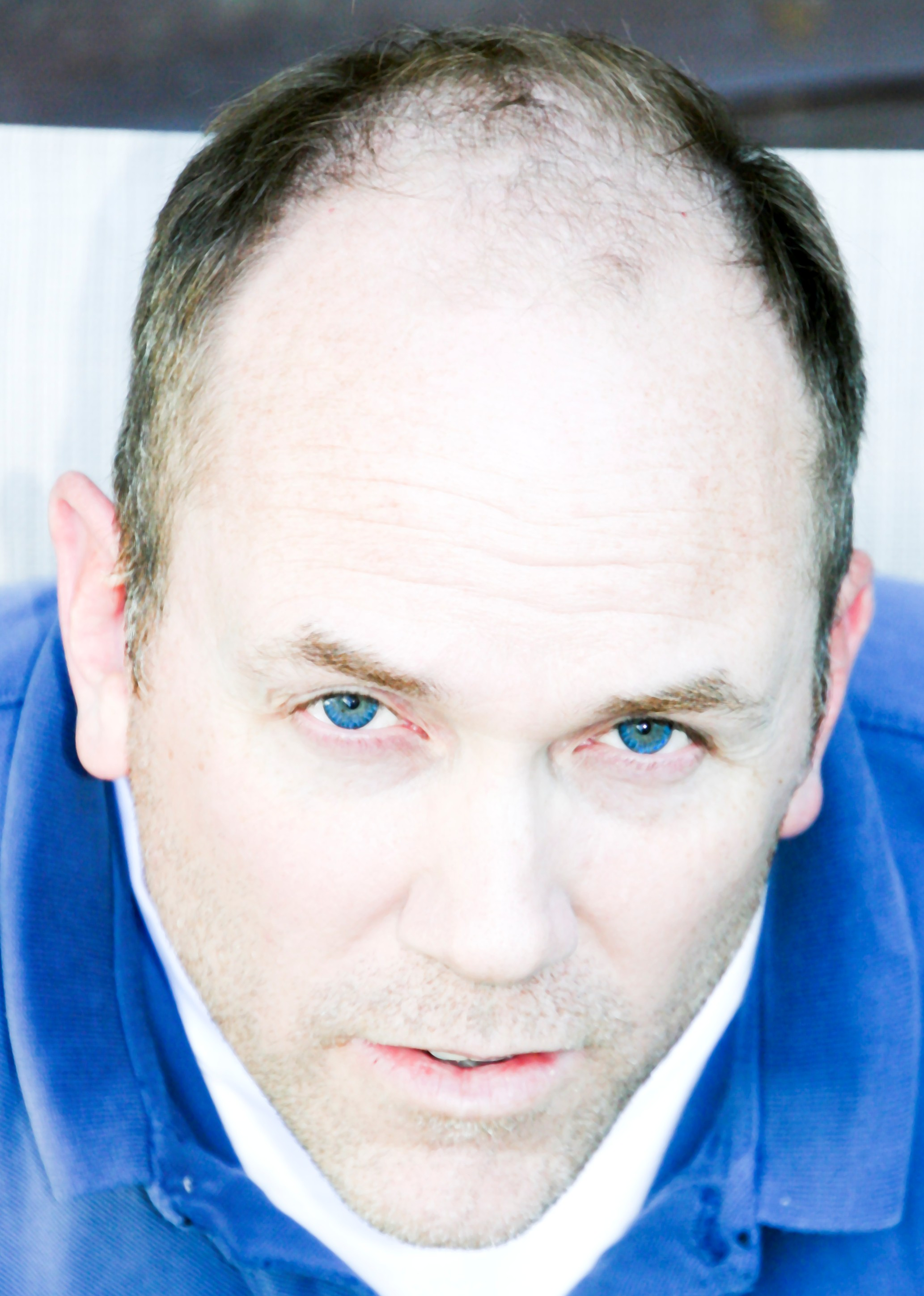
- McCarthy in 2012
- Born: T. C. McCarthy; United States
- Education: University of Virginia; University of Georgia (PhD)
- Occupations: Novelist, writer
- Writing career
- Genres: Science fiction, Literary Fiction
- Notable works: Germline; Exogene; Chimera
- Website: tcmccarthy.com

T. C. McCarthy is an American science fiction author. His first novel, Germline, won the 2012 Compton Crook Award.

== Education ==
McCarthy earned a bachelor's degree from the University of Virginia. He also earned a PhD in geology from the University of Georgia. While pursuing his PhD, McCarthy was a Fulbright Scholar.

== Writing ==
McCarthy's main work, a trilogy called the Subterrene War series, was originally intended to be a single book containing three novellas. The first novel in the series, Germline, won the 2012 Compton Crook Award. James Floyd Kelly, writing for Wired, called it "gritty" and "harsh," stating that "it takes real skill to lead a reader into actually seeing, smelling, and hearing (and maybe even tasting) the realities of war."

His writing influences include Michael Herr.

== Awards and nominations ==
- 2012: Won the Compton Crook Award for Best First Novel for Germline, Orbit Books, 2011
- 2013: Nominated for the Prometheus Award for Best Libertarian Novel of the Year for Chimera, Orbit Books, 2012

== Selected bibliography ==
=== Novels ===
- Germline (August 1, 2011, Orbit Books, ISBN 978-0-316-12818-6) (Compton Crook Award winner)
- Exogene (March 1, 2012, Orbit Books, ISBN 978-0-316-12815-5)
- Chimera (July 31, 2012, Orbit Books, ISBN 978-0-316-12817-9)
- Tyger Burning (July 2, 2019, Baen Books, ISBN 978-1-481-48410-7)
- Tyger Bright (February 2, 2021, Baen Books, ISBN 978-1-982-12517-2)

=== Novelettes ===
- "The Legionnaires" (April 18, 2011, Orbit Books)
- "A People's Army (March 15, 2012, Orbit Books)
- "Sunshine" (June 15, 2012, Orbit Books)

=== Short fiction ===
- "A Dry and Dusty Home" (Spring 2010, Per Contra: The International Journal of the Arts, Literature, and Ideas, Issue 18)
- "Private Exploration" (June 2, 2011, Nature, Vol. 474, p. 120)
- "A.I.P." (2012, Story Quarterly, Vol. 45)
- "Seven Miles" (2013, Baen Books)

== See also ==
- List of science-fiction authors
