= Richard Garfinkle =

American writer of science fiction (born 1961)

- Born: 1961 (age 64–65)
- Education: Clarion West Writers Workshop
- Occupation: Author
- Spouse: Alessandra Kelley
- Children: 2
- Writing career
- Genre: Science fiction
- Notable awards: Compton Crook Award (1997)
- Website: www.richardgarfinkle.com/index.html

Richard Garfinkle (born 1961) is an American writer of science fiction.

He is best known as the author of Celestial Matters, a novel published by Tor Books, which won the Compton Crook Award in 1997.

Garfinkle is a 1992 graduate of the Clarion West Writers Workshop and was nominated twice for the John W. Campbell Award for Best New Writer.

He has taught at numerous writers' workshops at Windycon, an annual Chicago-area science fiction convention, and at Chicon 2000, the 58th World Science Fiction Convention, held in Chicago. He's married to Alessandra Kelley and has two daughters.

== Bibliography ==
- Celestial Matters (novel, Tor Books, April 1996). ISBN 0-312-85934-1
- All of an Instant (novel, Tor Books, November 1999). ISBN 0-312-86617-8
- "The Last Invasion of Ireland" in Once Upon a Galaxy, Wil McCarthy, Martin H. Greenberg, and John Helfers, eds. (collection, Daw Books, September 2002). ISBN 0-7564-0091-0
- Three Steps to the Universe: From the Sun to Black Holes to the Mystery of Dark Matter (nonfiction, with brother David Garfinkle, University of Chicago Press, November 2008). ISBN 0-226-28346-1
- Exaltations (novel, Achronal Press, June 2009). ISBN 978-0-578-03514-7
- Wayland's Principia (novel, Achronal Press, August 2009). ISBN 978-0-578-02362-5
