= Katie Waitman =

American science fiction writer (born 1956)

Katharine Lura Waitman (born October 24, 1956, in Palo Alto, California) is an American science fiction writer. She is best known for the Compton Crook Award winning The Merro Tree. Her second book was The Divided.
