= James Stoddard (author) =

American fantasy author

James Stoddard is an American fantasy author. He lives in West Texas, the United States, where he taught Sound Recording at the college level for many years before leaving to write full time. Stoddard's first published short story, The Perfect Day, was penned under the name James Turpin and appeared in Amazing Stories in 1985.

Stoddard won the 1999 Compton Crook Award for his novel The High House. The book was also nominated for the 1999 Mythopoeic Fantasy Award, placed in the top ten of the Locus Best First Novels of 1999, and was nominated for the Crawford Award by the International Association of the Fantastic in the Arts. In 2018 he was one of five judges of the prestigious Philip K. Dick awards.

== Novels ==
1. The High House (1998) (Compton Crook Award winner)
2. The False House (2000)
3. The Night Land, A Story Retold (2011)
4. Evenmere (2015) (Book 3 in the award-winning Evenmere series)
5. The Back of the Beyond (2020) (Book 1 of The Animonean Chronicles)
6. Liberty Bell and the Last American (2021)

== Short stories, novellas, novelettes ==
1. "The Perfect Day" (1985 as James Turpin in Amazing Stories)
2. "The Star Watch" (January 2002 in The Magazine of Fantasy and Science Fiction)
3. "The Battle of York" (July 2004 in The Magazine of Fantasy and Science Fiction)
4. "The Star to Every Wandering Barque" (October/November 2007 in The Magazine of Fantasy and Science Fiction)
5. "The First Editions" (April 2008 in The Magazine of Fantasy and Science Fiction)
6. "Christmas at Hostage Canyon" (Jan/Feb 2011 The Magazine of Fantasy and Science Fiction)
7. "The Ifs of Time" (March/April 2011 The Magazine of Fantasy and Science Fiction)
8. "The Coasts of Hope" (Issue 324 2017 Galaktika (Hungarian Magazine))
9. "Day of the Shark" (Issue #2 2018 Tales from the Magician's Skull)
10. "Cage of Honor" (Issue #4 2020 Tales from the Magician's Skull)

== Music ==
1. Evenmere, A Song Cycle Based on the Novel, The High House (2021)
