= Tamara Siler Jones =

American fantacy novelist

- Occupation: Writer
- Writing career
- Pen name: Tambo Jones
- Genre: Fantasy
- Notable awards: Compton Crook Award (2005)

Tamara Siler Jones is an American fantasy novelist.

Her first novel, Ghosts in the Snow, won the 2005 Compton Crook Award. Her second, Threads of Malice, was nominated for the 2006 Gaylactic Spectrum Awards.

Her three books follow a group of investigators in a society still recovering from a devastating ancient war, without many of the technologies it once enjoyed. The lead character, Dubric Byerly, is an aging noble, war veteran, and widower responsible for peace and security in Castle Faldorrah and its local villages. Along with his squire, Dien, and young assistant pages Lars and Otlee, Dubric solves crimes and enforces the law in Faldorrah.

The ghosts of murder victims began haunting Dubric after the murder of his wife Oriana, and they do not depart until their killers are brought to justice.

The three books combine fantasy and thriller, with the plot driven by a particular mystery or crime. They contain consistently dark themes but are often balanced with a dry black humor.

Tamara Siler Jones now writes under a semi-pseudonym, Tambo Jones. She has produced additional works featuring Dubric Byerly, including The Lord Apparent's Razor, Rabbits and Wasps, and Protection of the Holy Knights.

== Books ==
- Ghosts in the Snow (October 26, 2004, ISBN 0-553-58709-9)
- Threads of Malice (October 25, 2005, ISBN 0-553-58710-2)
- Valley of the Soul (October 31, 2006, ISBN 0-553-58711-0)
