= Stephen L. Burns =

American novelist

Stephen L. Burns is an American science fiction and fantasy author. In short fiction he is most associated with the magazine Analog Science Fiction and Fact and has won their "Anlab" readers poll four times. He has also won the Compton Crook Award and in 2000 was nominated for the Philip K. Dick Award.

== Bibliography ==
=== Novels ===
- Burns, Stephen L. (1999). Flesh and silver.
- Call from a Distant Shore (2000)

=== Short fiction ===
Stories (Note: Short stories unless otherwise noted.)

Title	Year	First published	Reprinted/collected	Notes
Playthings	2016	Burns, Stephen L. (April 2016). "Playthings". Analog Science Fiction and Fact. 136 (4): 88–104.		Novelette

- "Taking Heart" (1984)
- "A Touch Beyond" (1985)
- "The Man of Peace" (1985)
- "Redeemer's Riddle" (1987)
- "In the Kingdom at Morning" (1987)
- "The Reading Lesson" (1988)
- "Pleased to Meat You" (1988)
- "The Arrow's Flight" (1989)
- "The Nearly Infinite Possibilities of Junk" (1989)
- "The Bridge Over Darikill Fel" (1990)
- "Angel" (1990)
- "A Roll of Round Dice" (1991)
- "Tranquillity Rose" (1992)
- "Green Fuse" (1992)
- "Leap" (1993)
- "White Room" (1993)
- "Showdown at Hell Creek" (1993)
- "Song from a Broken Instrument" (1994)
- "Down Under Crater Billy" (1995)
- "Capra's Keyhole" (1995)
- "Alexandrian Librarians" (1996)
- "The Wait" (1997)
- "Pitstop" (1997)
- "Masks of Flesh and Brass" (1998)
- "Roll Over Vivaldi" (1998)
- "The Coverture Incident" (1998)
- "Vultures" (1999)
- "You May Already Be a Winner" (1999)
- "Soapbox Cop Blues" (2000)
- "Night Voices" (2000)
- "Eden Tag" (2000)
- "Going, Going, Gone" (2001)
- "Look Away" (2002)
- "Green Light, Red Light" (2002)
- "Capture Radius" (2003)
- "Short Line Loco" (2004)
- "Smiling Faces in Hog Heaven" (2005)
- "Nothing to Fear But" (2006)
- "The Face of Hate" (2007)
- "Righteous Bite" (2008)
- "The fourth thing". Analog. 128 (9): 65–69. September 2008.
- "Mea Culpa". Analog. 128 (11): 99–101. Nov 2008.
- "Chain". Analog. 129 (6): 35–45. Jun 2009.
- "Nothin' but Blue Skies". Analog. 130 (4): 68–73. Apr 2010.
- "Pandora's Pantry". Analog. 138 (11 & 12): 42–55. Nov/Dec 2018.

———————

Bibliography notes
