= After the Zap =

1987 novel by Michael Armstrong

After the Zap is a science fiction novel by American writer Michael Armstrong, published by Popular Library in 1987.

== Plot summary ==
After the Zap is set in Alaska, where mutations in humans occur after an experimental electromagnetic device detonates.

== Reception ==
J. Michael Caparula reviewed After the Zap in Space Gamer/Fantasy Gamer No. 81. Caparula commented that "This is a fun, fast-paced book that I think SG/FG readers will like a lot."

== Reviews ==
- Review by Faren Miller (1987) in Locus, #315 April 1987
- Review by Joe Sanders (1987) in Fantasy Review, July–August 1987
- Review by Edward Bryant (1987) in Rod Serling's The Twilight Zone Magazine, October 1987
- Review by Ken Lake (1989) in Paperback Inferno, #80
- Kliatt
