= Amatka =

2012 novel by Karin Tidbeck

- Author: Karin Tidbeck
- Translator: Karin Tidbeck
- Cover artist: Lisa Sjöblom
- Language: Swedish
- Genre: Dystopian; Psychological thriller; Speculative fiction
- Publisher: Mix förlag, Vintage Books (English)
- Publication date: 2012
- Publication place: Sweden
- English publication date: 2017
- Pages: 223
- ISBN: 978-9186845346
- Dewey Decimal: 839.738
- LC Class: PT9877.3.I45 A6313
- Website: https://www.karintidbeck.com/amatka

Amatka is a 2012 novel by Karin Tidbeck, originally written in Swedish, and published in English in 2017. Set in a world shaped by language, it follows Vanja, who is sent to the Amatka colony on a work assignment, where she falls in love with her housemate. Central themes of the novel include political oppression, limited freedom and deep conspiracies.

== Summary ==
Coming from the colony of Essre, Vanja (formally known as Brilars' Vanja Essre Two) is sent by a government body to Amatka in order to find out what hygiene products the people there use. She goes on to live in a house with three others, namely Nina (Ulltors' Nina Four), Ivar (Jondis' Ivar), and Ulla (Sarols' Ulla Three), all of whom have a role to play in the workings of Amatka.

Despite misgivings about Vanja's mission, Nina introduces her to the colony's departments so that she can gather more information for her research. As days go by, Vanja meets specialists from different fields and is eventually led to discover that Amatka — along with the other colonies — may not be as it appears.

== Translations ==
In addition to the original Swedish edition, published by Mix in 2012, the novel has been translated into multiple languages:

- Spanish, published by Ediciones Nevsky, 2016
- English, published by Vintage Books, 2017
- Hungarian, published by Athenaeum, 2017
- French, published by La Volte, 2018
- Portuguese, published by 20|20, 2018
- Turkish, published by İthaki, 2018
- Czech, published by Kniha Zlín, 2018

== Awards ==
Amatka was regarded as one of the best science fiction books of 2017 by The Guardian. It was nominated for the following awards:

- Locus Award Finalist, First Novel, 2018
- Compton Award 2018
- Prix Utopiales 2018
