= Zak Smith =

American artist and pornographic actor (born 1976)

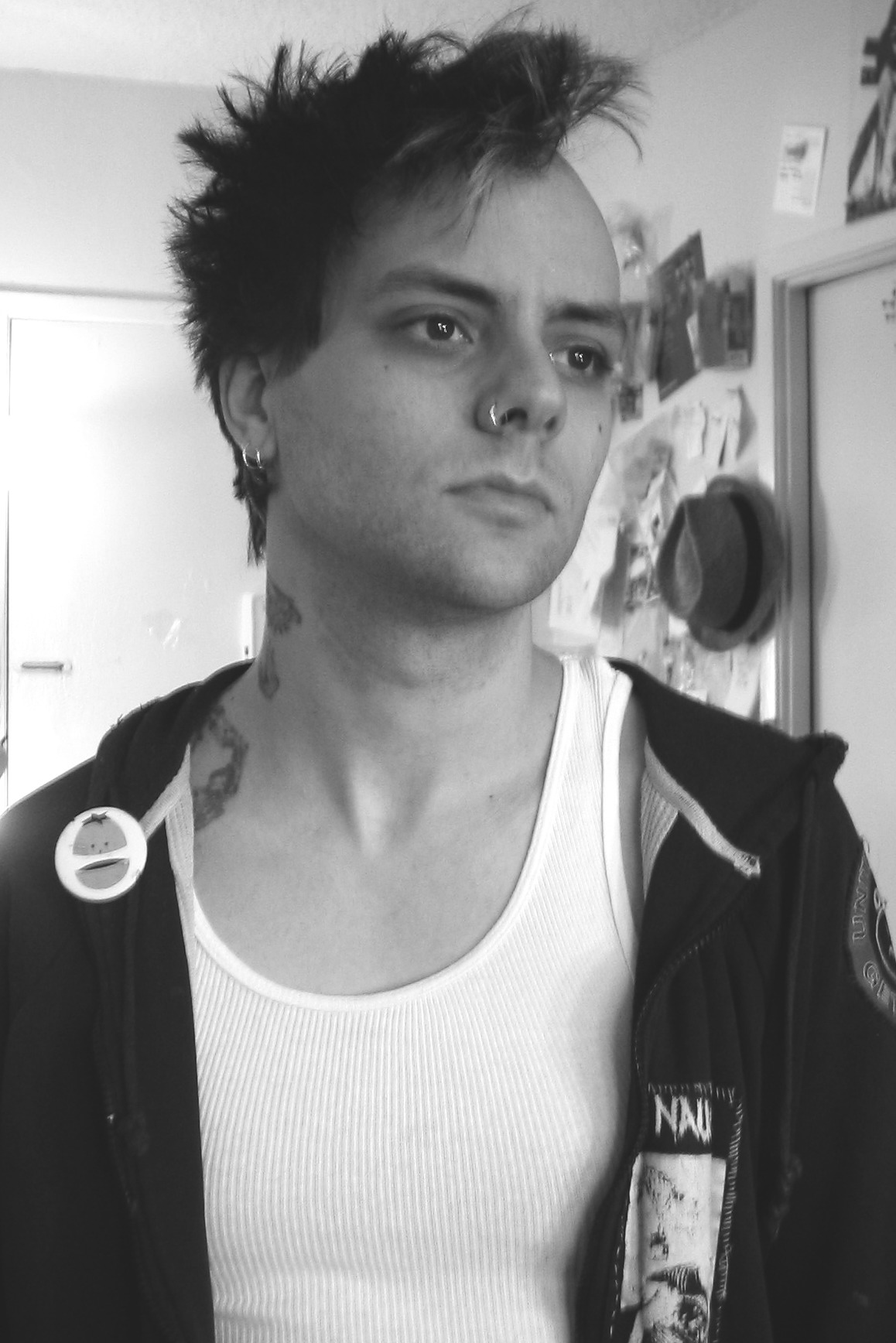
- Smith in 2005
- Born: July 16, 1976 (age 50); Syracuse, New York, U.S.
- Other name: Zak Sabbath
- Education: Cooper Union; Yale University
- Known for: Art; RPG development
- Spouse: Mandy Morbid (divorced)

Zak Smith (born July 16, 1976), also known as Zak Sabbath, is an American artist, role-playing game author, and pornographic film actor.

== Early life and education ==
Smith was born in July 16, 1976, in Syracuse, New York. His father, Howard Jay Smith, is a writer and former television executive.

Smith received a BFA from Cooper Union in 1998, studied at Skowhegan School of Painting and Sculpture and a MFA from Yale University in 2001.

== Career ==
Smith is known for his portraiture in a style that blends influences including abstract painting and comic book art. These portraits include his series of paintings of strippers, Girls in the Naked Girl Business, two of which are in the collections of the Museum of Modern Art and the Whitney Museum. Some of his works are shown on Artsy.

His work Pictures Showing What Happens on Each Page of Thomas Pynchon's Novel Gravity's Rainbow is a multimedia composition of 760 drawings, photos, and paintings, one for each page of the novel's first printing. It was exhibited at the 2004 Whitney Biennial and is now owned by the Walker Art Center.

Smith has written for role-playing games such as Lamentations of the Flame Princess, Demon City, the Cube World series of adventures, I Am the Weapon, and Places to Go, People to Be. Several of his contributions received awards, including multiple ENNIEs for various Lamentations of the Flame Princess products.

Smith is also known as an adult film actor. He entered the pornography industry through the 2006 movie Barbed Wire Kiss. The director, Benny Profane, had asked to use one of Smith's Gravity's Rainbow paintings in the movie and gave Smith a small role in exchange.

== Abuse allegations ==
In February 2019, due to allegations of physical, sexual, and emotional abuse by several women including his former wife, adult industry performer Mandy Morbid, Wizards of the Coast announced that they would be removing all references to Smith from the print and digital editions of Dungeons & Dragons fifth edition, OneBookShelf announced it would no longer work with Smith, and he was also banned from attending Gen Con.

Smith denied the accusations and filed defamation lawsuits against Morbid and others. His defamation suit against Gen Con was dismissed in May 2023 after Smith deliberately violated discovery rules by failing to respond to Gen Con's requests, a decision upheld by the Washington Court of Appeals in October 2024. In 2025 Smith sued Morbid for defamation in Ottawa, where she lives. The court ruled for him on claims relating to sexual and physical abuse, but not for emotional abuse. This judgement was confirmed on appeal in 2026.

== Personal life ==
Smith lived and worked in Brooklyn, New York, until October 2007, when he moved to Los Angeles. He was married to adult industry performer Mandy Morbid. Smith describes himself as an anarchist.

== Bibliography ==
=== Art ===
- Zak Smith: Pictures of Girls (New York: Distributed Art Publishers, 2005). ISBN 978-1-933045-22-1
- Pictures Showing What Happens on Each Page of Thomas Pynchon's Novel Gravity's Rainbow (graphic representation of novel/illustration) (Portland, Oregon: Tin House Books, 2006). ISBN 0-9773127-9-8
- We Did Porn: Memoir and Drawings. (Portland, Oregon: Tin House Books, 2009). ISBN 978-0-9802436-8-0
- The Worst Breakfast (illustrator, with writer China Miéville, Akashic Books, 2016). ISBN 978-1-6177548-6-9

=== RPGs ===
- Vornheim: The Complete City Kit (Lamentations of the Flame Princess, 2011). ISBN 978-9-5259042-4-6
- A Red & Pleasant Land (Lamentations of the Flame Princess, 2014). ISBN 978-9-5259046-0-4
- Death Frost Doom (Lamentations of the Flame Princess, 2014). ISBN 978-9-5259048-3-3
- Maze of the Blue Medusa (with Patrick Stuart, Satyr Press, 2016). ISBN 978-0-9832437-5-5
- Frostbitten & Mutilated (Lamentations of the Flame Princess, 2018). ISBN 978-9-5272380-2-8

== Awards ==
Year	Award	Category	Work
2011	ENNIE Awards	Honorable Mention in "Best Aid/Accessory"	Vornheim: The Complete City Kit
2011	Diehard GameFAN	Tabletop Gaming Award for "Best Campaign Setting"	Vornheim: The Complete City Kit
2012	IndieCade	"Best Technology of the Year"	Vornheim: The Complete City Kit
2014	Indie RPG Awards	"Best Production"	A Red and Pleasant Land
2015	ENNIE Awards	Silver for "Best Adventure" + "Product of the Year"	A Red and Pleasant Land
2015	ENNIE Awards	Gold for "Best Setting" + "Best Writing"	A Red and Pleasant Land
2016	ENNIE Awards	Silver for "Best Cartography" + "Best Writing"	Maze of the Blue Medusa
2016	ENNIE Awards	Gold for "Best Electronic Book"	Maze of the Blue Medusa
2018	ENNIE Awards	Silver for best "Art - Interior" + "Setting" + "Writing"	Frostbitten & Mutilated
2018	ENNIE Awards	Gold for "Best Monster/Adversary"	Frostbitten & Mutilated
