= The Black Tides of Heaven =

2017 novella by Neon Yang

- Author: Neon Yang
- Cover artist: Yuko Shimizu
- Language: English
- Series: Tensorate
- Release number: 1
- Publisher: Tor.com
- Publication date: September 2017
- ISBN: 978-0-7653-9541-2
- Followed by: The Red Threads of Fortune
- Website: neonyang.com/books/

The Black Tides of Heaven is a 2017 LGBT fantasy novella by Singaporean author Neon Yang. The story centers around the twin children of the Protector, whose magic powers cause them to become entangled in the political machinations of their mother. It is one of the first two novellas in the Tensorate series, the other being The Red Threads of Fortune. It was a finalist for the Hugo Award for Best Novella, Locus Award for Best Novella, and World Fantasy Award—Novella.

== Plot summary ==
Sanao Hekate, The Protector, rules her empire with the help of Tensors, people who can control elemental forces known as the Slack. She opposes the development of technology for non-Tensor use and violently oppresses her populace at any hint of rebellion. As payment for the Grand Monastery's help in suppressing a rebellion, she sends her twin children Akeha and Mokoya to them.

The children train their slackcraft with the monks of the monastery, becoming proficient in the usage of their powers. Mokoya begins to have dreams which prophesy future events, particularly events involving violence; any attempt to prevent these prophecies from occurring is impossible. Mokoya suffers psychologically from the effects of her nightmares, creating strain between the twins. When the twins are almost seventeen, they undergo gender confirmation. Children in the world of the Tensorate are raised without gender, and physical differences between the sexes are suppressed by slackcraft. Mokoya chooses to be confirmed as female, while Akeha chooses to be confirmed as male.

Mokoya prophesies that a young man named Thennjay will become the next Head Abbot, despite the disapproval of the Protector. The Protector begins using Mokoya's powers to strengthen her rule but has no use for Akeha. Akeha flees the city and begins a career as a smuggler. Mokoya stays in the city, marries Thennjay, and has a daughter named Eien.

Akeha falls in love with a man named Yeongchow, who is part of the Machinist rebellion. Machinists believe that all citizens should have access to technology. The Tensors and Machinists are developing modern technologies such as guns and bombs, increasing violent conflict throughout the empire. An accident in a research lab in the Grand Monastery kills Eien and severely injures Mokoya; the Protector uses this event as a pretense for an assault on the Monastery. Akeha returns to the capital to face his mother. He bests her in a fight but does not kill her, and she agrees to withdraw troops from the monastery. Mokoya recovers and reunites with her brother for the first time in years.

== Background ==
The novella was published on the same day as The Red Threads of Fortune, and they can be read in any order. The Red Threads of Fortune was written first, and takes place after the events of The Black Tides of Heaven. In their pitch to Tor.com, Neon Yang stated that they had more Tensorate stories to tell. Though only one novella had been written at the time, this led to the idea of publishing both debut novellas on the same day.

== Reception and awards ==
The novella has been well-received critically, with positive reviews from fantasy authors such as Ken Liu. Hugo-winning author N. K. Jemisin recommended the book, praising the Tensorate novellas for their worldbuilding. Geeks OUT praised the novella for its treatment of gender identity, as well as its exploration of wealth inequality.

Several commenters have referred to the Tensorate world as silkpunk.

Awards and honors
Year	Work	Award	Category	Result	Ref.
2017	The Black Tides of Heaven	Kitschies Award	Debut Novel	Shortlisted	
2017	The Black Tides of Heaven	Nebula Award	Novella	Nominated	
2017	The Black Tides of Heaven	Tiptree Award (Note: Now known as the Otherwise Award)	—	Honor List (Note: Joint listing for The Black Tides of Heaven and The Red Threads of Fortune)	
2018	The Black Tides of Heaven	Hugo Award	Novella	Finalist	
2018	The Black Tides of Heaven	Locus Award	Novella	Finalist	
2018	The Black Tides of Heaven	World Fantasy Award	Novella	Nominated	
2020	The Black Tides of Heaven	Time Magazine	100 Best Fantasy Books of All Time	Listed	
2022	The Tensorate Series	Lambda Literary Award	Speculative Fiction	Finalist	
