= Karin Tidbeck =

Swedish writer (born 1977)

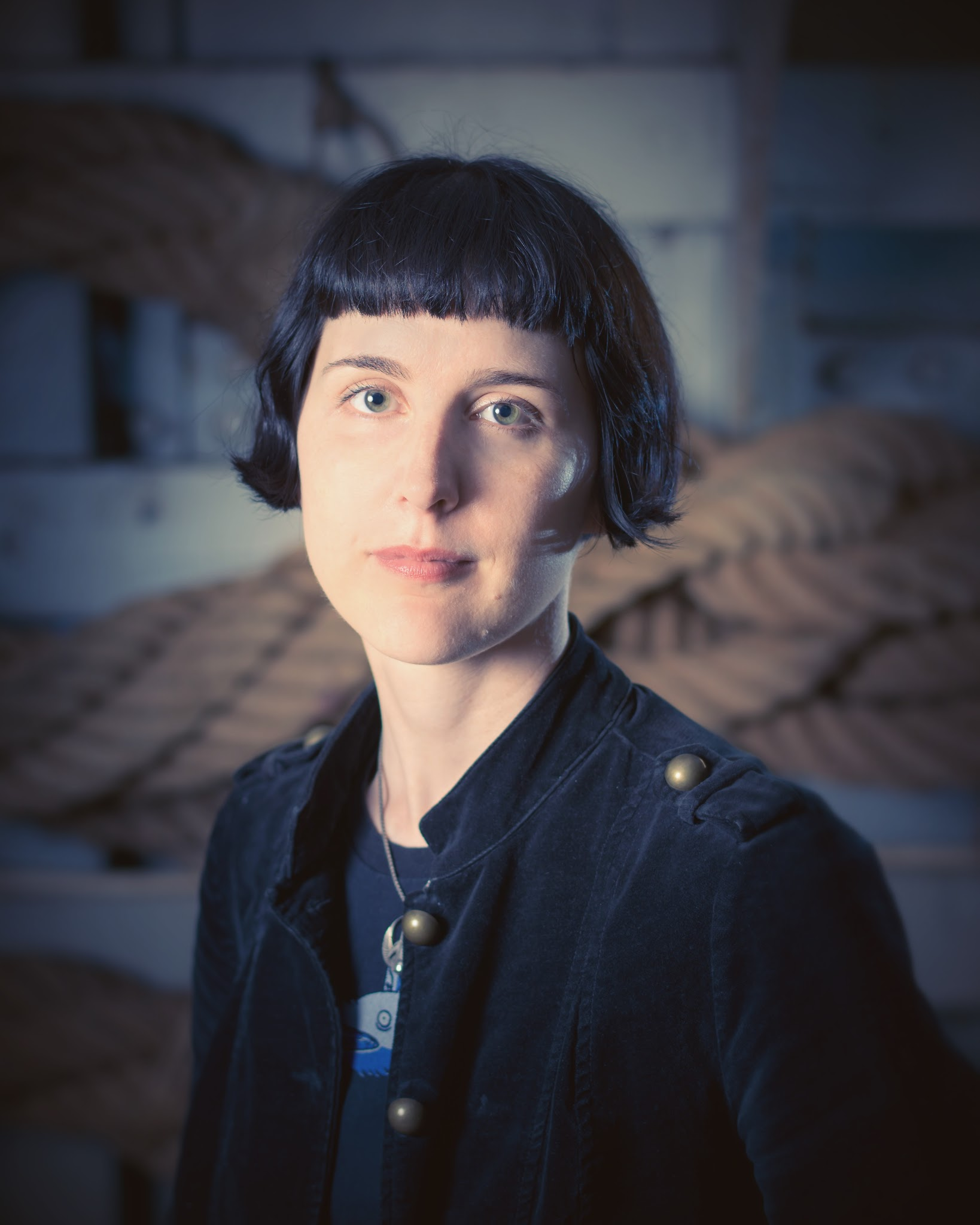
- Tidbeck in 2015
- Born: 6 April 1977 (age 49)
- Occupation: Writer
- Writing career
- Language: Swedish, English
- Genres: Fantasy, weird fiction
- Website: karintidbeck.com

Karin Margareta Tidbeck (born 6 April 1977) is a Swedish author of fantasy and weird fiction.

Tidbeck debuted with the short story collection Vem är Arvid Pekon? in 2010, followed by the novel Amatka in 2012. Their first work in English, the short story collection Jagannath, was published in 2012 by Cheeky Frawg to favorable reviews, with Gary K. Wolfe describing Tidbeck as "one of the most distinctive new voices in short fiction since Margo Lanagan". The collection made the shortlist for the 2012 James Tiptree Jr. Award and was nominated for the World Fantasy Award. The short story "Augusta Prima", originally written in Swedish, was translated into English by Tidbeck who won a Science Fiction & Fantasy Translation Award (2013) in the Short Form category. The English translation of Amatka was published in 2017.

Tidbeck uses the personal pronouns they/them.

== Works ==
- Vem är Arvid Pekon? ("Who is Arvid Pekon?"), Man Av Skugga, 2010, ISBN 978-9185253128. In Swedish.
- Amatka, Mix, 2012, ISBN 978-9186845346. In Swedish. Published in English in 2017.
- Jagannath, Cheeky Frawg, 2012, ISBN 978-0985790400. In English.
- Mage: The Ascension – Refuge, White Wolf Entertainment, 2017. In English. Interactive fiction video game.
- The Memory Theater, 2021. In English.
- Kosmos til Kisel ("Cosmos to Silicon"), Kraxa förlag, 2024. In Swedish.
- Gruvmaja ("Mine-Wife"), Kraxa förlag, 2024. In Swedish. ISBN 978-91-988186-8-0
