= The Red Threads of Fortune =

2017 novella by Neon Yang

- Official cover art for The Red Threads of Fortune
- Author: Neon Yang
- Cover artist: Yuko Shimizu
- Language: English
- Series: Tensorate
- Release number: 2
- Publisher: Tor.com
- Publication date: September 2017
- Pages: 214 (Paperback)
- ISBN: 9780765395399
- Preceded by: The Black Tides of Heaven
- Followed by: The Descent of Monsters
- Website: https://neonyang.com/books/

The Red Threads of Fortune is a 2017 LGBT fantasy novella by Singaporean author Neon Yang. After the death of her daughter, Tensor Sanao Mokoya has abandoned her position as prophet and now spends her time hunting naga in the wilderness. She must confront her past while protecting her Machinist allies.

== Plot summary ==
Four years after the death of her daughter Eien, Sanao Mokoya^{A} has separated from her husband Thennjay and spends her time hunting naga. She has lost her gift of prophecy and is now tormented by magical visions of her past, rather than the future. A gigantic naga attacks the city of Bataanar, a Machinist stronghold; Akeha and Mokoya fight it off. Mokoya is stunned by the naga's ability to use slackcraft, which is a human quality. Mokoya admits that when Eien died, she used the Slack to fuse Eien's soul to the nearest living creature, a raptor named Phoenix. Unknown actors from the Capital have used the success of Mokoya's experiment to fuse a human consciousness to this naga.

Mokoya meets a mysterious person named Rider, who uses advanced slackcraft for teleportation; she falls in love with them and begins a physical relationship. Rider states that Bataanarian adviser Tan Khimyan, Rider's former lover, is behind the attack. Raja Choonghey, leader of Bataanar, calls for Protectorate aid in the face of the naga attack. Mokoya suspects that the Protectorate soldiers will swarm the city, massacring Machinists and civilians alike. Akeha prepares the Machinists for war as Thennjay pleads with Choonghey to change his mind.

Mokoya and Thennjay ask Princess Wangbeng for aid. In Wangbeng's room, Mokoya finds Rider's teleportation equipment. She accuses Rider of summoning the naga, and they flee. The naga returns to attack the city, and Mokoya realizes Wangbeng is behind the attack. She learns that the naga is tied to the soul of Raja Ponchak, Wangbeng's mother. Wangbeng escapes with the naga. Mokoya is injured, but she is saved by Rider. She has a prophecy in which Rider is killed by the naga, her first vision in years. Mokoya attempts to subvert the prophecy in order to avert Rider's death; she leaves the camp and confronts the naga alone. With Wangbeng's help, Mokoya frees Ponchak's soul from the naga. She is severely injured, but is saved by Rider. Choonghey calls off the Protectorate troops. Thennjay and Rider work together to assist Mokoya with her recovery.

== Themes ==
Psychological trauma and recovery are central themes of the novella. Eien's death and Mokoya's inability to address it cause her to become passively suicidal. Initially, Mokoya is not able to deal with her trauma in a healthy way. Both the effects of Eien's death on Mokoya and the effects of Ponchak's death on Wangbeng are used to explore the ways in which loss and grief can affect human psychology. The novella explores the ways in which grief and loss can affect someone's mental state. It also provides a model for healthy recovery through the formation of meaningful relationships and the rejection of isolation.

The contrast between the formats of The Black Tides of Heaven and The Red Threads of Fortune draws attention to the themes of each novella. Whereas the first novella took place over decades, the sequel took place over a period of a few days; this draws a sharp contrast between the strengths and weaknesses of each twin. In the first novella, Mokoya was psychologically held hostage by her visions of the future; in the sequel, she is tormented by visions of her past. The novella urges readers to question how one's unchangeable past might control one's present, and whether or not someone can change their own destiny.

== Background ==
The novella was published on the same day as The Black Tides of Heaven. The Red Threads of Fortune was written first but takes place after the events of The Black Tides of Heaven. In their pitch to Tor.com, Neon Yang stated that they had more Tensorate stories to tell. Though only one novella had been written at the time, this led to the idea of publishing both debut novellas on the same day.

== Reception ==
The novella received moderately positive reviews. A reviewer for Locus found The Red Threads of Fortune to be more enjoyable than its prequel, stating that it had a more compelling emotional arc. Writing for the New York Times, Hugo-winning novelist N. K. Jemisin highly recommended the Tensorate novellas, praising their worldbuilding and magic system. Publishers Weekly gave a mixed review, praising the novella for its action sequences and depiction of trauma, while criticizing it for "murky" and "underdeveloped" descriptions of diplomatic conflicts.

== Notes ==
A. The surname is Sanao and the given name is Mokoya. In the Tensorate series, most characters' surnames are written first.
