= Neon Yang =

Singaporean writer of speculative fiction

- Born: 1982 or 1983 (age 43–44)
- Education: University of East Anglia (MFA)
- Occupation: Writer
- Writing career
- Language: English
- Genres: Speculative fiction; fantasy; science fiction
- Notable work: Tensorate series
- Website: neonyang.com

Neon Yang, formerly JY Yang, is a Singaporean writer of English-language speculative fiction. They are best known for the Tensorate series of novellas published by Tor.com, whose entries have been finalists for the Hugo Award, Locus Award, Nebula Award, World Fantasy Award, Lambda Literary Award, British Fantasy Award, and Kitschie Award. The first novella in the series, The Black Tides of Heaven, was named one of the "100 Best Fantasy Books of All Time" by Time magazine. Their debut novel, The Genesis of Misery, the first book in The Nullvoid Chronicles, was published in 2022 by Tor Books. The novel was a finalist for the 2023 Locus Award for Best First Novel and 2023 Compton Crook Award.

== Biography ==
Yang is non-binary and queer, and uses they pronouns. They have a master's degree in creative writing from the University of East Anglia and were a member of the 2013 class of the Clarion West Writers Workshop. They legally changed their name to "Neon" in 2020.

== Career ==
Yang has published short fiction since 2012 in publications such as Clarkesworld, Lightspeed, Uncanny Magazine, Apex Magazine and Strange Horizons. Their novelette, "Waiting on a Bright Moon" was a top ten finalist for the 2018 Locus Award for Best Novelette. Their novelette "Circus Girl, The Hunter, and Mirror Boy" was a finalist for the 2020 Ignyte Award. Their novelette, "A Stick of Clay, in the Hands of God, Is Infinite Potential" was a top ten finalist for the 2021 Locus Award for Best Novelette.

Their Tensorate series of novellas began in 2017 with the simultaneously released The Black Tides of Heaven and The Red Threads of Fortune, which were published by Tor.com to critical acclaim. In particular, The Black Tides of Heaven received nominations for numerous science fiction and fantasy literary awards. The Tensorate series continued with the novellas The Descent of Monsters in 2018 and The Ascent to Godhood in 2019.

Yang's debut novel, The Genesis of Misery, the first in The Nullvoid Chronicles trilogy, was announced by Tor Books in 2020. It was published in September 2022 and has been described as a retelling of the story of Joan of Arc as a mecha space opera.

=== Themes ===
Yang's work revolves around "the human body as a vessel for storytelling", and is based on their background as a molecular biologist, journalist and science communicator. They have described themself as "a deep pessimist about human nature," saying that "the best we can do is to recognize this and mitigate that assholic nature when we can. I think, ultimately, that’s what most of my stories end up being about." They have referenced David Mitchell, Helen Oyeyemi, and William Gibson as influences on their writing.

Yang has described their Tensorate novellas as "queer Asian science fantasy." The series has been described as "silkpunk" by reviewers.

== Awards and nominations ==
Awards and honors
Year	Work	Award	Category	Result	Ref.
2017	The Black Tides of Heaven	Kitschies Award	Debut Novel	Shortlisted	
2017	The Black Tides of Heaven	Nebula Award	Novella	Nominated	
2017	The Black Tides of Heaven	Tiptree Award (Note: Now known as the Otherwise Award)	—	Honor List (Note: Joint listing for The Black Tides of Heaven and The Red Threads of Fortune)	
2017	The Red Threads of Fortune	Tiptree Award	—	Honor List	
2018	The Black Tides of Heaven	Hugo Award	Novella	Finalist	
2018	The Black Tides of Heaven	Locus Award	Novella	Finalist	
2018	The Black Tides of Heaven	World Fantasy Award	Novella	Nominated	
2018	The Red Threads of Fortune	Locus Award	Novella	Finalist	
2018	"Waiting on a Bright Moon"	Locus Award	Novelette	Finalist	
2019	The Descent of Monsters	Lambda Literary Award	LGBTQ SF/F/Horror (Note: Now known as the Lambda Literary Award for Speculative Fiction)	Finalist	
2019	The Descent of Monsters	Locus Award	Novella	Finalist	
2020	The Ascent to Godhood	British Fantasy Award	Novella	Shortlisted	
2020	The Ascent to Godhood	Locus Award	Novella	Finalist	
2020	The Black Tides of Heaven	Time Magazine	100 Best Fantasy Books of All Time	Listed	
2020	"Circus Girl, the Hunter, and Mirror Boy"	Ignyte Award	Novelette	Finalist	
2021	"A Stick of Clay, in the Hands of God, is Infinite Potential"	Locus Award	Novelette	Finalist	
2022	The Genesis of Misery	Goodreads Choice Award	Science Fiction	Finalist	
2022	The Tensorate Series	Lambda Literary Award	Speculative Fiction	Finalist	
2023	The Genesis of Misery	Compton Crook Award	—	Finalist	
2023	The Genesis of Misery	Locus Award	First Novel	Finalist	

== Bibliography ==
=== Novels ===
The Nullvoid Chronicles trilogy

1. — (27 September 2022). The Genesis of Misery. Tor Books. ISBN 9781250788979.

=== Novellas ===
==== Tensorate series ====
1. — (2017). The Black Tides of Heaven. Tor.com. ISBN 978-0-7653-9541-2.
2. — (2017). The Red Threads of Fortune. Tor.com. ISBN 978-0-7653-9540-5.
3. — (2018). The Descent of Monsters. Tor.com. ISBN 978-1250165855.
4. — (2019). The Ascent to Godhood. Tor.com. ISBN 9781250165886.

The four volumes were collected in an omnibus edition:

- — (2021). The Tensorate Series. Tor.com. ISBN 9781250807540.

==== Standalone ====
- — (16 October 2018). Between the Firmaments. Book Smugglers Publishing. ISBN 9781942302827.
- — (6 May 2025). Brighter than Scale, Swifter than Flame. Tordotcom. ISBN 9781250357342.

=== Other short fiction ===
==== Collections ====
- —; Chng, Joyce, eds. (1 November 2012). The Ayam Curtain. Math Paper Press. ISBN 978-981-07-4008-5.

==== Stories ====
- — (1 January 2012). "Captain Bells and the Sovereign State of Discordia". In Lim, Rosemary; Maisarah bte Abu Samah (eds.). The Steampowered Globe. Two Trees. ISBN 9789810705497.
- — (1 August 2013). "Old Domes". In Fernandes, Fabio; al-Ayad, Djibril (eds.). We See a Different Frontier: A Postcolonial Speculative Fiction Anthology. Futurefire.net. ISBN 9780957397521.
  - Reprinted: — (October 2016). "Old Domes". Clarkesworld Magazine. No. 121.
- — (1 November 2013). "Tiger Baby". In Ye, Stephanie (ed.). From the Belly of the Cat. Math Paper Press. ISBN 9789810776565.
- — (16 June 2014). "Storytelling for the Night Clerk". Strange Horizons.
- — (July 2014). "Harvestfruit". Crossed Genres. No. 19.
- — (September 2014). "Patterns of a Murmuration, in Billions of Data Points". Clarkesworld Magazine. No. 96.
- — (November 2014). "Mother's Day". Lontar: The Journal of Southeast Asian Speculative Fiction. No. 3.
- — (20 November 2014). "Where No Cars Go". In Lundberg, Jason Erik (ed.). Fish Eats Lion: New Singaporean Speculative Fiction. Math Paper Press. ISBN 9781502984821.
- — (23 January 2015). "Cold Hands and the Smell of Salt". Daily Science Fiction.
- — (5 May 2015). "A Sister's Weight in Stone". Apex Magazine. No. 72.
- — (27 May 2015). "Red Is the Color of Mother Dirt". In Allen, Maggie; Spendlove, Janine K. (eds.). Athena's Daughters: Women in Sci-Fi & Fantasy. Vol. 2. Silence in the Library. ISBN 9781941650394.
- — (June 2015). "Letter from an Artist to a Thousand Future Versions of Her Wife". Lightspeed. No. 61.
- — (19 June 2015). "Re: (For CEO's Approval) Text for 10th anniversary exhibition for Operation Springclean". Bahamut (1). Underland Press. ISBN 9781630230098.
- — (August 2015). "A House of Anxious Spiders". The Dark. No. 9.
- — (Fall 2018). "Song of the Krakenmaid". Lackington's. No. 8.
- — (October 2015). White, Brian J. (ed.). "Temporary Saints". Fireside. No. 28.
- — (January 2016). "Secondhand Bodies". Lightspeed. No. 68.
- — (April 2016). "Her Majesty's Lamborghini and the Girl with the Fish Tank". Lontar: The Journal of Southeast Asian Speculative Fiction. No. 6.
- — (May 2016). "The Blood That Pulses in the Veins of One". Uncanny Magazine. No. 10.
- — (June 2016). "Four and Twenty Blackbirds". Lightspeed. No. 73.
- — (6 July 2016). "Transfers to Connecting Flights". In Lemberg, Rose (ed.). An Alphabet of Embers: An Anthology of Unclassifiables. Stone Bird Press. ISBN 9780997381405.
- — (August 2016). "Before the Storm Hits". sub-Q.
- — (9 August 2016). "Dismantling London". Geeky Giving: A SFF Charity Anthology. Geeky Giving. ISBN 9781536526868.
- — (Fall 2016). "The Beachings". The Sockdolager.
- — (20 October 2016). "Ya-Ya Papaya". In Shurin, Jared (ed.). The Extinction Event. Jurassic London. ISBN 9780993519307.
- — (1 November 2016). "Pocket Cities". In Zhang, Ruihe; Balasinghamchow, Yu-Mei (eds.). In Transit: An Anthology from Singapore on Airports and Air Travel. Math Paper Press. ISBN 9789811109386.
- — (1 January 2017). "A Burner of Sins". In Stotts, Taneka (ed.). Elements: Fire - A Comic Anthology by Creators of Color!. Beyond Press. ISBN 9780998282800.
- — (16 February 2017). "The Slow Ones". GlitterShip (Podcast).
- — (7 March 2017). "Auspicium Melioris Aevi". Uncanny Magazine. No. 15.
- — (14 March 2017). "Glass Lights". In Murad, Mahvesh; Shurin, Jared (eds.). The Djinn Falls in Love & Other Stories. Solaris Books. ISBN 9781781084175.
- — (12 July 2017). VanderMeer, Ann (ed.). "Waiting on a Bright Moon". Reactor. Illustrated by Victo Ngai.
- —; Allen, Mike; Chandrasekera, Vajra; El-Mohtar, Amal; Theodoridou, Natalia (Spring 2018). "A Game of Lost and Found". Lackington's. No. 17.
- — (30 January 2019). VanderMeer, Ann (ed.). "Circus Girl, The Hunter, and Mirror Boy". Reactor. Illustrated by Ashley Mackenzie.
- — (3 September 2019). "Bridge of Crows". In Parisien, Dominik; Wolfe, Navah (eds.). The Mythic Dream. Saga Press. ISBN 9781481462396.
- — (13 March 2020). "The Search for [Flight X]". In VanderMeer, Ann (ed.). Avatars Inc: A Sci-Fi Anthology. Xprize Foundation. ISBN 9781734336214.
- — (May 2020). "A Stick of Clay, in the Hands of God, Is Infinite Potential". Clarkesworld Magazine. No. 164.
- — (7 July 2020). "The Exile". In Strahan, Jonathan (ed.). The Book of Dragons. Illustrated by Rovina Cai. HarperVoyager. ISBN 9780062877161.

== See also ==
- List of fantasy authors
- List of LGBT writers
- List of science-fiction authors
