= Donald Kingsbury =

Canadian mathematician and writer (born 1929)

Donald Kingsbury (born 12 February 1929, in San Francisco) is an American–Canadian science fiction author. Kingsbury taught mathematics at McGill University, Montreal, from 1956 until his retirement in 1986.

== Bibliography ==
=== Books ===
- Courtship Rite. New York : Simon and Schuster, July 1982. ISBN 0-671-44033-0. (Nominated for Hugo for Best Novel in 1983) (Compton Crook Award winner) (Prometheus Award Hall of Fame 2016 winner) Published in UK as Geta.
- The Moon Goddess and the Son. New York : Baen Books, December 1986. ISBN 0-671-55958-3. (Short version nominated for Hugo Award for Best Novella in 1980)
- Psychohistorical Crisis. New York : Tor Books, December 2001. ISBN 0-7653-4195-6. (Winner, 2002 Prometheus Award)
- The Finger Pointing Solward has been awaited ever since the publication of Courtship Rite. Kingsbury has never finished the story, noting as far back as September 1982 that he was still "polishing" it (see interview with Robert J. Sawyer) and as recently as his self-supplied Readercon biography in July 2006. Artist Donato Giancola placed a copy of the intended cover on his gallery page: this cover was used in 2016 for the Bradley P. Beaulieu collection In the Stars I'll Find You. In 1994, an excerpt was published as "The Cauldron".

=== Short fiction ===
- "The Ghost Town", Astounding Science Fiction, June 1952.
- "Shipwright", Analog, April 1978.
- "To Bring in the Steel", Analog, July 1978.
- "The Moon Goddess and the Son", Analog, December 1979.
- "The Survivor", Man-Kzin Wars IV, September 1991.
- "The Heroic Myth of Lieutenant Nora Argamentine", Man-Kzin Wars VI, July 1994.
- "The Cauldron", Northern Stars: The Anthology of Canadian Science Fiction, September 1994.
- "Historical Crisis", Far Futures, December 1995.
