= Sail On! Sail On! =

- Short story by Philip José Farmer
- Country: United States
- Language: English
- Genre: Science fiction

Publication
- Published in: Startling Stories
- Publication type: Science fiction magazine
- Publisher: Standard Magazines
- Media type: Pulp magazine
- Publication date: 1952

"Sail On! Sail On!" is an alternate history short story by American writer Philip José Farmer, first published in Startling Stories 1952. In an alternative 1492, Christopher Columbus sets out to find a shortened route to China and South-East Asia across the Atlantic, financed by Ferdinand V and Isabella I of Spain. However, in this timeline, the Earth is flat, though scientists and philosophers have doubts about its geological provenance, and an Angelo Angelli is mentioned as proving Aristotle's axiom that objects of different weights drop with different velocities (which Galileo Galilei disproved in our world).

Radio technology exists in 1492, and the shipboard operator of a telegraph is a "Friar Sparks", although the principles are described in religious terms involving angels' winglength as a substitute for radio waves and the involvement of cherubim hurling themselves across the ether to send the signal (giving rise to "kilo-cherubs" as a measurement of frequency, denoted as "k c.", and "continuous wingheight", denoted as "c w", both radio terms in the real world). Psychology also exists, which means that Columbus's vessels do not turn back despite growing unease and ominous warning signs. It turns out that the Americas do not exist, and that this world is a disc, not a sphere; so, like other transatlantic travellers, Columbus and his colleagues sail over the edge of the world into Earth orbit, and never return from their mission.

== Sources ==
- Guimont, Edward (2026). The Power of the Flat Earth Idea: History from the Marginalised. Palgrave Macmillan. ISBN 978-3-032-23980-8.
- Mary Brizzi: Readers Guide to Philip José Farmer: Mercer Island, Washington: Starmont House: 1981: ISBN 0-916732-05-3
