= The Moon Goddess and the Son =

1986 novel by Donald Kingsbury

- First edition cover
- Author: Donald Kingsbury
- Cover artist: David B. Mattingly
- Language: English
- Genre: Science fiction
- Publisher: Baen Books
- Publication date: December 1, 1986
- Publication place: United States
- Media type: Print (Hardcover & Paperback)
- Pages: 409
- ISBN: 0-671-55958-3 (hc)
- OCLC: 11532199
- Dewey Decimal: 813/.54 19
- LC Class: PS3561.I487 M66 1986

The Moon Goddess and the Son is a science fiction novel by American writer Donald Kingsbury, published by Baen in 1986. The novel was an expanded version of a novella published in the December 1979 issue of Analog magazine, which was a nominee for the Hugo Award for Best Novella in 1980.

Along with the novella, Kingsbury and Roger Arnold published a nonfiction article describing the technologies used in the story for achieving cheap access to Low Earth orbit and beyond. Their LEOport station allows suborbital IMP vehicles to pop up and align themselves with a 100 km long deceleration track. The station vents gas into the airscoop of an 'impact reaction engine', which uses inverted aerobraking to match speed with the station.

== See also ==
Non-rocket spacelaunch
