= List of stories featuring nuclear pulse propulsion =

Nuclear pulse propulsion is a common feature of hard science fiction stories, as the idea offers high thrust and/or high specific impulse drives without requiring new physics.

== Books ==
- From 1932 to 1933, Philip Wylie and Edwin Balmer wrote "When Worlds Collide". Two rogue planets cause chaos when they enter the Solar System. The biggest one, named Bronson Alpha, a kind of giant gas planet, is on collision course with Earth. The smallest one, Bronson Beta, is thought to be habitable. To escape the doomed Earth, an atomic rocket is planned based on recent discoveries in atomic science. The spaceship will carry 100 persons along with animals, seeds, books, etc. The problem is the extreme heat from the atomic reactor. No known metal can contain the atomic reaction. Fortunately, an alloy is found just in time and in sufficient abundance to build two spaceships. They reach Bronson Beta and Bronson Alpha destroys Earth.
- Robert A. Heinlein's 1940 short story "Blowups Happen" mentions powering spaceships with nuclear bombs.
- The 1951 novel Wine of the Dreamers, by John D. MacDonald, involves the development of a hybrid interstellar ship. Its spacetime-warp drive cannot be used near planets, so the ship would leave Earth by feeding pellets into a "critical mass chamber" of 20 Mohs hardness.
- An early appearance of an Orion-style nuclear pulse propelled rocket in science fiction was in the science fiction novel Empire of the Atom written by A. E. van Vogt in 1956. In this novel there is a post-atomic-war interplanetary empire called the Empire of Lynn that uses Orion-type nuclear rockets for interplanetary spaceflight. In the story the past atomic war was an interstellar war fought between humans and hostile aliens from another star somewhere between 800 and 8000 years before.
- A crewed mission to Venus on a ship using Orion-like photon engine is a core of 1960 science fiction novel The Land of Crimson Clouds, written by the Strugatsky brothers.
- Early versions of 2001: A Space Odyssey featured a version of the spaceship Discovery One using this drive. The final vehicle did not use this idea since Stanley Kubrick decided that showing the ship accelerate by a 'put-put' method might be "too comic" for film, as well as the fact that it might be seen as him having embraced nuclear weapons after his prior film, Dr. Strangelove. The novel by Arthur C. Clarke has references to the Orion drive.
- An Orion spaceship features prominently in the science fiction novel Footfall by Larry Niven and Jerry Pournelle. In the face of an alien siege/invasion of Earth, the humans must resort to drastic measures to get a fighting ship into orbit to face the alien fleet.
- In the novel King David's Spaceship by Jerry Pournelle inhabitants of a planet that is to be re-admitted to the Empire plot to build the spaceship based on an Orion project concept in order to qualify their planet as a higher-developed, Class One Imperial world. However, this craft uses non-nuclear explosives.
- Poul Anderson's novel Orion Shall Rise features a post-collapse confederation gathering forbidden nuclear materials for some unknown end—although the title gives away the true nature of their mysterious project.
- In The Stone Dogs by S. M. Stirling, Orion spacecraft are created during an arms race between the Domination of the Draka and the Alliance for Democracy, and used by both sides in their explorations of the solar system and as warships. The drive itself features as an improvised weapon in the book, being used to keep other ships at a distance.
- In the book The Shiva Option by David Weber and Steve White, an arachnid homeworld is destroyed by converting several asteroids into Orion-drive starships and launching them at it.
- Orion was used by Michael P. Kube-McDowell in Emprise, the first book of the Trigon Disunity series.
- The speculative fiction novel Anathem by Neal Stephenson features a spacecraft that travels between different dimensions and uses an Orion-style propulsion system. This ship, the Daban Urnud, is discovered by observing the nuclear explosions used to modify its orbit.
- Dan Simmons' novel Olympos describes an Orion-style spaceship, designed by the Moravec machine race to emulate 21st century human technology.
- The 1977 short story and Hugo-award winner 'Tricentennial' by Joe Haldeman featured the Daedelus (or John F. Kennedy, or Leonid Brezhnev - apparently spaceships are also prone to renaming), which was powered by nuclear bombs.
- In Vernor Vinge's novel Marooned in Realtime, bobble technology makes this method of travel safe.
- In his 1981 anthology Cepheïde, Dutch SF/Fantasy author Tais Teng describes a ship with Orion propulsion as one of the most primitive and wasteful methods of interstellar flight, still only achieved by a tiny minority of all intelligent races in the universe. The ship is said to be the last relic of an unknown race exterminated by the dominant YiYiki (descendants of the humpback whales).
- In the John Varley novel The Golden Globe, the wreck of an Orion spaceship is converted to an interstellar starship.
- John Varley's Steel Beach sets several scenes near or within the bulk of the "Robert A. Heinlein," an Orion-style ship which was built and then abandoned when humanity lapsed into apathy for stellar exploration.
- Chris Berman's novel, The Hive, involves the use of a ground-launched Orion spacecraft by the People's Republic of China in a gamble to reach an alien artifact in orbit between Jupiter and Saturn before the crew of a spacecraft built by the United States and Russia can reach it first. The novel has been banned in China until "these references are removed" which shows how sensitive the whole subject of nuclear bomb propulsion still is.
- In Stephen Baxter's novel Ark a starship Ark One is built to save a small group of people as Earth drowns under a global flood. It launches and performs the first phase of its mission using a version of Orion. This version is ground-launched though owing to the situation (the entire planet is about to drown anyway) environmental concerns are set aside.
- In the books Ilium and Olympos by Dan Simmons a spaceship with Orion thrust is used to travel through the Solar System over the course of a week.
- In the book Citadel by John Ringo, an Orion Drive is used to upgrade the 9 km diameter Battlestation Troy into a mobile spaceship.
- In the Frontlines series by Marko Kloos, the only defense Earth has against an alien menace are the Orion Missiles, large pykrete projectiles powered with nuclear explosions from behind that push them towards their target.
- In Kim Stanley Robinson's 2015 novel Aurora, an interstellar spacecraft uses a fusion rocket to decelerate.

== Movies & television ==
- The Star Trek: The Original Series episode "For the World is Hollow and I Have Touched the Sky" features a generation ship, constructed out of a hollowed-out iron asteroid, propelled using "Orion class nuclear pulse engines" in which fission bombs were detonated in shafts. It appeared to have been traveling for about 10,000 years, and had travelled about 30 light years on its own power.
- The Space: 1999 episode "Voyager's Return" featured a fictional nuclear drive probe called "Voyager One", powered by the life-destroying "Queller Drive", which killed all the life forms on two of the Federated Worlds of Sidon. The episode centers on the Sidons's seek for revenge against Earth.
- In the FOX television series Virtuality, Phaeton (Earth's first starship) is propelled by an Orion drive.
- The 1998 film Deep Impact featured a spacecraft named Messiah, which utilized the "Orion drive" and appears to be a variant of nuclear detonation propulsion. In the film, the drive is credited to the Russians.
- The 2006 movie Earthstorm with Stephen Baldwin and Dirk Benedict. The crew sent to the moon used nuclear pulse to get to there faster than conventional means.
- The Orion concept is used in the series premiere of Ben 10: Ultimate Alien for Earth's first interstellar spaceship.
- In Mobile Suit Zeta Gundam, the GRYPS-2 laser cannon and the asteroid base Axis use Orion-type drives.
- While it never comes up in the actual show, in the DVD extras for Firefly, Joss Whedon mentions that his idea for the "full burn" propulsion in the title spacecraft class was a directed nuclear detonation.
- The 2011 movie Attack of the Moon Zombies features an "Orion Atomic Pulse Rocket" that transports people and supplies to a lunar base. The model was based on the lunar ferry design described in a Project Orion report.
- In the 2012 National Geographic documentary Evacuate Earth, an interstellar ark ship built to transport evacuees from Earth to Barnard's Star uses a nuclear pulse drive based on Project Orion.
- The 2014 Syfy Channel miniseries Ascension is based on a Project Orion generation ship being built in the early 1960s.

== Video games ==
- In the backstory for the 1999 video game Sid Meier's Alpha Centauri, the sleeper ship is propelled by an Orion-type drive, the shield of which fails (almost certainly due to sabotage) when the ship is almost at its destination, causing the passengers on the colony ship to splinter into factions.
- The 2019 announcement trailers for Kerbal Space Program 2 featured a nuclear pulse propulsion engine in flight over the game's planet of Duna.
- The 2026 video game Terra Invicta includes nuclear pulse propulsion as a usable technology for interstellar spacecraft.
