= List of fictional vehicles =

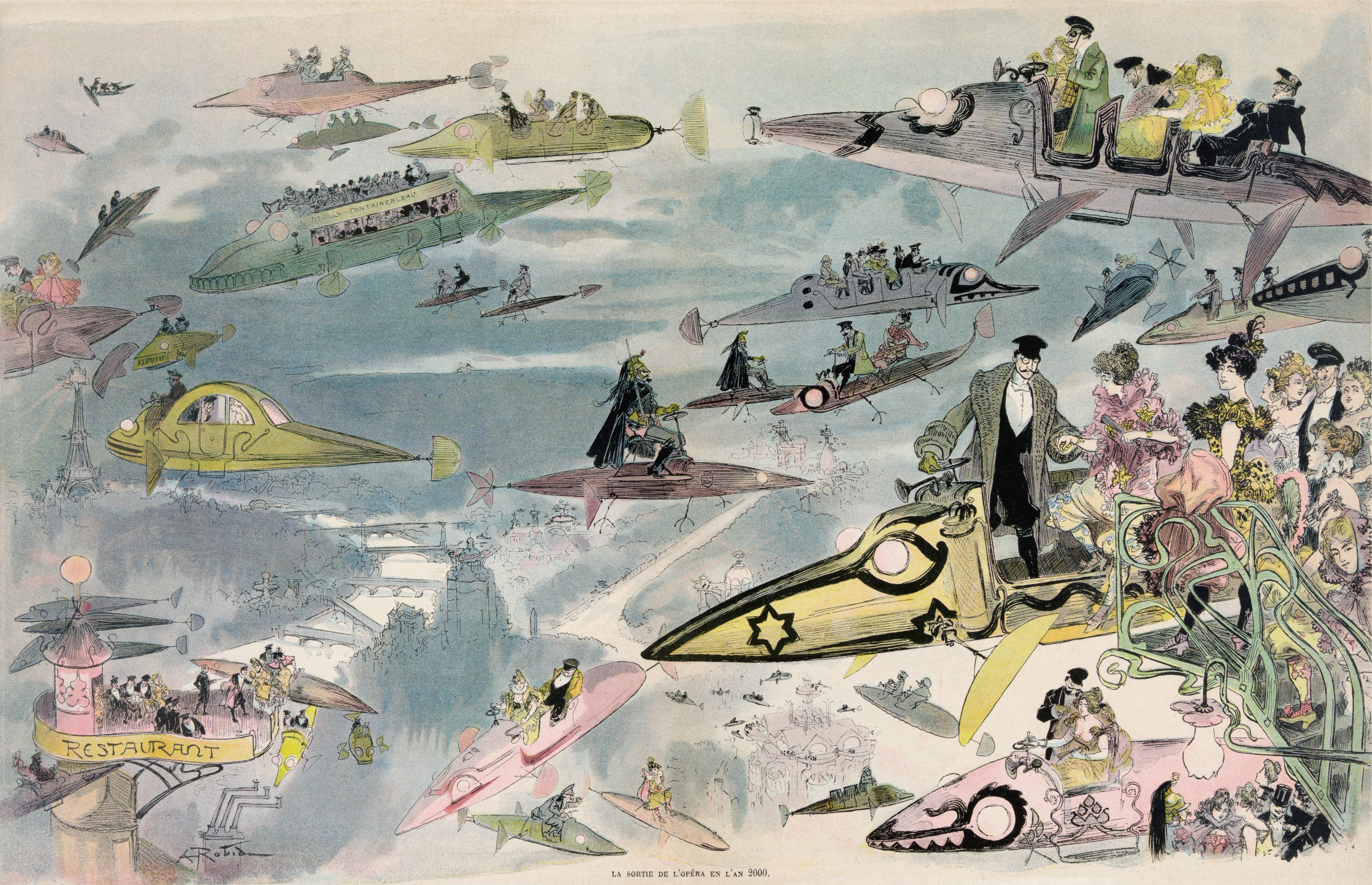
Sky filled with imaginary flying vehicles

The following is a list of fictional vehicles.

== List of lists ==
- List of fictional aircraft
- List of fictional cars
- List of fictional ships
- List of fictional spacecraft

== Buses ==
Buses often appear as settings, or sometimes even characters, in works of fiction. This is a list of named buses which were important story elements in notable works of fiction, including books, films and television series.

- The Battle Bus, from Fortnite
- Bus 25/25, from the 1994 film Speed
- Catbus, a sentient bus from the 1988 film My Neighbor Totoro
- "Cyclops", a nuclear-powered bus from the 1976 film The Big Bus
- "Bertie the Bus" and "Bulgy the Double-Decker Bus", from The Railway Series and Thomas & Friends.
- "Doris", the fictional band's tour bus in the 2000 film Almost Famous.
- The Knight Bus, which appears in several of the Harry Potter books and films
- The Magic School Bus
- "Priscilla", the eponymous bus in the 1994 film The Adventures of Priscilla, Queen of the Desert
- "Sweetheart", in John Steinbeck's The Wayward Bus
- "Tayo", "Rogi", "Lani", and "Gani", bus characters from the Korean animated children's show, Tayo the Little Bus.
- "Miss Fritter", from Cars 3
- "School Bus Graveyard", a thriller webcomic
- "Transit", a Decepticon bus character who only appeared in "Transformers: Robots In Disguise" comics
- "Busking" from "Tobot"
- "Busy Buses", a British animated show about talking buses, which ran from 2002 to 2005
- "Bisma" and "Draka" from an Indonesian animated show "Dunia Loko"

== Hovercraft/anti-gravity vehicles ==
- Hoverboard
- Snowspeeder
- Speeder bike
- Fast attack (Javelin, Land Speeder, etc.) and main battle platforms (Astraeus, Repulsor, etc.) - Warhammer 40000

== Magical vehicles ==
- Broomstick
- Catbus
- The Chariot of Morgan Mwynfawr
- Killdozer
- Magic carpet
- Mortar (bowl)
- Seven-league boots
- Ruby slippers
- Cinderella's pumpkin coach
- Santa's sleigh
- The Yellow Submarine

== Mecha ==
- Big Darrell - OK K.O.! Let's Be Heroes
- Big O - The Big O
- E-frame - Exosquad
- EXO-45 Patriot Exosuit - Helldivers 2
- EXO-49 Emancipator Exosuit - Helldivers 2
- Evangelions - Neon Genesis Evangelion
- Mobile weapons - Gundam
- Tripod - three-legged Martian fighting machine, armed with a heat-ray, The War of the Worlds
- VF-1 Valkyrie - variable geometry space fighter from Robotech (TV series)
- Voltron
- Z-Mech - Plants vs. Zombies: Garden Warfare 2
- Metal Gear robotic war engines - Metal Gear
- BattleMechs - bipedal walker battle robots from BattleTech game series.
- Titans, smaller Imperial Knights and their counterparts of other races - Warhammer 40000
- Heavy Gears - bipedal warsuits from a Heavy Gear science fiction game universe
- Dreadnought - Warhammer 40k
- BT-7274 and other Titans - Titanfall & Titanfall 2

== Railroads and trains ==
- Blaine the train - the Dark Tower by Steven King
- Hooterville Cannonball - Petticoat Junction
- The Quadrail trains - the Timothy Zahn series
- Undersea Super Train: Marine Express
- The Wanderer - The Wild Wild West
- Wabash Cannonball
- Baby Train
- Snowpiercer
- Supertrain
- Galaxy Express 999
- Tachypomp
- Blaine the Mono
- The Polar Express
- The Hogwarts Express - Harry Potter
- The Atlantic Express - Avalanche Express
- Central Pacific Railroad No. 131 - Back to the Future Part III
- The Transcontinental Express - The Cassandra Crossing
- The Indian Valley Railroad - Shining Time Station and Thomas And The Magic Railroad
- Wilson, Brewster and Koko - Chuggington
- Azul - Dora the Explorer
- Casey Junior - Dumbo (1941) and Dumbo (2019)
- Puffa and Little Owl - TUGS
- Driver Dan's Story Train
- The Greendale Rocket and The Pencaster Flyer - Postman Pat
- Ivor the Engine
- The Ninky Nonk - In the Night Garden
- The Spirit Train - The Legend of Zelda: Spirit Tracks

=== The Railway Series and Thomas & Friends ===
There are many railway and other 'vehicle' characters in The Railway Series children's books by Rev. W. Awdry. The Thomas & Friends franchise based on the books shares many characters with the original books but also introduces a vast array of new characters. For a list, please see:

- List of The Railway Series and Thomas & Friends characters

== AFVs ==
=== Tanks ===
- Bolo - AI armored super-heavy tank
- Drill Dozer - Drilling tank from Drill Dozer, piloted by child gentleman thief Jill.
- Griffon tank - Warhammer 40000
- RX-75 Guntank - Mobile Suit Gundam
- TD-220 Bastion MK XVI - Helldivers 2
- Leman Russ - a main battle tank of Astra Militarum, backbone armed force of Imperium of Humankind from Warhammer 40000
- Baneblade, Fellblade and their variants - super heavy tanks from Warhammer 40000
- Type 2 Armored Personnel Carrier from patlabor 2

== Other ==
- Howl's Moving Castle
- TARDIS
- B-Ped - Teen Titans
- Farcaster - Hyperion Cantos
- Time Tunnel - The Time Tunnel
- Transporter - Star Trek
- Time machine - novella "The Time Machine" by H. G. Wells
- Laputa - Gulliver's Travels and Castle in the Sky
- Steam Castle - Steamboy
- Manhattan Island - Cities in Flight
- Death City - Soul Eater (anime but not manga)
- 2019 Spinner - self-contained lift, Blade Runner 1982 design by Syd Mead
- Supercar - Supercar
- Monocycle race in Venus war

== See also ==
The following are lists of mixed types of vehicles, not otherwise categorized above:

=== Literature ===
- Known Space#Technology
- List of stories featuring nuclear pulse propulsion
- Intelligent car

=== Film ===
- List of James Bond vehicles
- List of Star Wars air, aquatic, and ground vehicles
- List of Star Wars spacecraft
- List of Star Wars starfighters

=== Television ===
- Buck Rogers in the 25th Century
- Fireman Sam - vehicles
- New Captain Scarlet - vehicles and aircraft
- Terrahawks - vehicles
- Thunderbirds machines
- Transformers
- Zaido: Pulis Pangkalawakan - vehicles

=== Games ===
- Warhammer 40,000
