= Animation of Royal Space Force: The Wings of Honnêamise =

Animation of the 1987 anime film

During the production of Gainax's 1987 debut work, Royal Space Force: The Wings of Honnêamise, director Hiroyuki Yamaga and his assistant directors Takami Akai and Shinji Higuchi had limited or no experience in professional animation. Yamaga had directed an episode of the 1982-83 TV series Macross as well as the amateur Daicon III and IV Opening Animations, for which Akai had been an animator and character designer. Higuchi's filmmaking experience was in live-action special effects; Akai and Yamaga remarked that he brought interesting ideas and techniques to the project because he did not "think like an animator." Only the third of the assistant directors, Shoichi Masuo, had worked extensively in anime on a professional level; Masuo would express Yamaga's abstract directives to the animators in concrete terms.

Masuo viewed Royal Space Force's animation as not employing the techniques to create visual interest or amusement often associated with anime, instead making an impression that was "quite cinematic," maintaining "there's nothing else [in anime] like this where you can do proper acting and realistic mechanical movements." Masuo felt that the great difficulties engaged by the film's artists was in the portrayal of normal, everyday activities, and that it required "a lot of challenging work for the key animators." Masuo's associate, Hideaki Anno, who served as the film's special effects artist, likewise remarked that two frequent criticisms of Royal Space Force were that "it could have looked more like a [typical] anime" but also contrariwise that it would have been more appropriate for it to be made in live-action. Anno felt these views failed to apprehend the advantage of using animation for filmmaking as a precise transmission of directorial intent, and the film's aim to convey a sense of reality rather than a look of live-action as such: "All I can say to people who want to see something more anime-like on their screen is that they should watch other anime."

Yamaga intended that the film break from the traditional division of labor system in anime where animators drew scenes as already directed in the storyboard; animators were instead asked to think out themselves how to execute motions and camera angles in meetings where they would physically act out the events of a scene. Higuchi recalled that many animators enjoyed the process, yet some refused to work in such a fashion, and Yamaga himself acknowledged that this attempt to encourage individual expression in the animators necessarily meant they had to perform tremendous additional creative labor on the project. Akai and Yamaga remarked that since they weren't "animation purists," they altered the animation drawings, cels, and timesheets in ways that were not traditional industry practice, to the extent that "the young people who followed in our footsteps in creating anime thought that was how it was done," speculating that they may have created new traditions for anime by breaking the old on the production of Royal Space Force.

== Animation ==
=== Yamaga, Akai, and Higuchi: the outsider perspective ===
After the completion in December 1985 of Daicon Film's final project, Orochi Strikes Again, (Note: Orochi was Daicon Film's only 16 mm film project; its previous works (both live-action and anime) had been shot on 8 mm, with the exception of Kaiketsu Notenki, which had been shot with a video camera. Okada remarked however that, prior to approaching Bandai, he had originally thought of following up Orochi by making Royal Space Force as a 16 mm, 40-minute long Daicon amateur anime film. Orochi proved to be both a difficult and expensive production that first used up Daicon Film's remaining funds, and then required further investment by Daicon's related merchandising company General Products; eventually the money to complete Orochi was obtained by selling its home video rights to Bandai.) its director Takami Akai and special effects director Shinji Higuchi moved to Tokyo to join the production of Royal Space Force as two of its three assistant directors, alongside Shoichi Masuo. Higuchi would make the first scene actually animated and filmed in Royal Space Force, depicting a newsreel of Shirotsugh arriving in the capital city; its look was achieved by filming the cels using the same 8mm camera that Daicon had used for its amateur productions. At age 20, Higuchi was the very youngest of the main crew; his previous creative experience had been in live-action special effects films rather than anime. Higuchi was described as someone who did not "think like an animator," and would therefore bring unorthodox and interesting ideas and techniques to the project. The director felt that Royal Space Force benefitted from the creative contributions of people from outside anime, including opening and ending credits artist Nobuyuki Ohnishi, and several part-time college design students who did not go on to pursue a career in animation; Akai and Yamaga joked in retrospect that, owing to their scant experience, at the time they themselves had limited familiarity with the anime industry.

The newsreel scene was located near the beginning of the storyboard's "C part". (Note: The original storyboard used the style "C part" (Cパート), rather than "Part C" as might be the more usual phrasing in English.) The third out of the anime's four roughly equal half-hour divisions, the C part began with the scene of Riquinni working in the field, and concluded with the assassination attempt. Royal Space Force followed the practice, adapted from TV episodes, of breaking the storyboard up into lettered parts; although intended to denote the parts before and after a mid-show commercial break, the practice was also used in theatrical works for convenience in production. As 1985 drew to a close, Bandai had still not formally committed to Royal Space Force as a feature-length film release, as a distributor for the movie had not yet been secured. Yamaga was also late in finalizing the storyboard, which would not be completed in its entirety until June 1986. (Note: Higuchi recalled in 2004 that because Yamaga's work on the actual storyboard of Royal Space Force had been slow, his first assigned task as assistant director was to draw up a fake storyboard to show Bandai, in order to give the impression that Gainax was further along in their progress than they actually were. Higuchi commented that he drew the fake storyboard without really understanding the director's script, and remarked that while he did understand the film once it was actually completed, he had only pretended to while he was actually working on it.) However, the C part was nearly finished, and the decision was made to start production there, on the reasoning also that the sober tone of many C part scenes required precision in expression; as there was no release date yet, it was better to work on them while the schedule was still relatively loose. Higuchi remarked in a 2004 interview that because Yamaga's storyboards were minimalist, containing only the field size, the number of characters in the frame, and the placement of the dialogue, (Note: Highly detailed storyboards would be published in two 1987 books on Royal Space Force; however, these were later reconstructions of scenes from the finished movie, using Yamaga's own storyboard and script as a basic guide, but employing as their actual visual elements graphics made during the course of the film production by the designers and animators, such as the genzu (the backgrounds in their original linework stage, before being made into color paintings) and the layouts (black and white illustrations that depict the basic composition and constructive elements of an individual shot, including line drawings of both the background of a shot and the characters present in it).) Royal Space Force was not made in a typical fashion for an anime, where the animators would be given directives to "draw this picture." Instead they were asked to "think out the performance in this scene," with meetings where the animators themselves determined how scenes would move by first physically acting them through as if they were attempting to convey it to an audience; the camera angles to be used were also decided by the animators through discussion. He described the process in retrospect as having been "a lot of fun," yet noted there were some animators who had refused to work in such a fashion, and backed away from the production. (Note: Yamaga had expressed an awareness at the time of the extra burden of labor that had necessarily been placed on the artists by asking them to personally conceive and express the look and flow of individual scenes, rather than just execute directives: "The most important thing was that we were able to bring out everyone's individuality, and break free from the division of labor system [usually employed] in anime production. However, many of us had only been in the anime industry for a short time, so we had to make do with what we had. Even with the same staff, if I were asked to do this twice, I don't think I could. When we first started, we wondered how long we were going to last, because everyone complained, but [in the end] they completed the job just as I said. Even when they were angry, I'd answer back to them, 'You know what I mean!' If you're a painter, you probably just want to concentrate on your work. But we didn't let you, so the amount of work each had to do was unimaginable.") Higuchi noted that he himself had doubted at first whether he'd made a mistake by joining the project, which he initially found difficult to understand.

=== Masuo and Anno: expert animators vs. conventional anime ===
Royal Space Force assistant director Shoichi Masuo was an associate of Hideaki Anno, whom he had met when the two worked together on the 1984 Macross film, where Masuo served as an assistant animation director. Anno had moved to Tokyo the previous year to pursue a career as an independent animator; Masuo and Anno, who were the same age were among the co-founders of Studio Graviton, a Tokyo office for animators working freelance such as themselves. Following his work as a key animator and mecha animation director on 1986's Project A-ko, Masuo joined Gainax. Masuo described the roles of himself and the two other assistant directors on Royal Space Force: Higuchi had overall charge regarding the design aspects of the settei, Masuo was in charge over the color aspects of the settei, including backgrounds, (Note: Although Masuo described the genzu as amazing in of themselves, he placed particular emphasis on how art director Hiromasa Ogura expressed them in the finished film; he argued that the animation cel art on its own could not have conveyed the world building aspect, asserting that the background art tells more about the world of Royal Space Force than do the film's characters.) whereas Akai monitored the work as a whole as general assistant to Yamaga. These roles were not fixed, and the three did not confer on a daily basis, but rather would have meetings on how to shift their approach whenever changes in the production situation called for it.

"From the first, I did the layouts and drawings with the real thing in mind ... For that purpose, I flew in airplanes and helicopters, [rode in] Type 74 tanks, visited aircraft carriers and NASA. I also witnessed the launch of the Shuttle and exercises of the Japanese Self-Defense Forces. But I had never experienced war, nor did I want to, and for this my references were news footage, videos, and documentary films. What I experienced only through images and words, I accepted as quote, reality, unquote."

— Hideaki Anno, 1987

Masuo, who had been working in anime professionally since the 1981 TV series GoShogun, noted as well that he had the most experience of the three in animation, and if an animator seemed confused over abstract directives from Yamaga, Masuo would explain in concrete terms how to execute the director's intent. Regarding the animation style of Royal Space Force, Masuo remarked that it was generally straightforward, without the characteristic quirky techniques to create visual interest or amusement often associated with anime, but that "there's nothing else [in anime] like this where you can do proper acting and realistic mechanical movements. That's why its impression is quite cinematic...In animation, it's very difficult to do something normal. When you consider [Royal Space Force], there are many scenes where the characters are just drinking tea or walking around. You don't take notice of [such actions], yet they're very difficult to draw, and I think it required a lot of challenging work for the key animators." Following Royal Space Force, Masuo would remain closely associated with the works of both Gainax and Anno's later Studio khara as a key animator, technical director, and mechanical designer before his death in 2017.

Anno remarked that two frequent criticisms of Royal Space Force were that "there was no need to make this as an anime" (i.e., as opposed to a live action film), but also contrariwise that "it could have looked more like a [typical] anime;" however, he maintained that both viewpoints missed what had been essential for the film, the intent of which was that the audience perceive reality in an authentic sense. Anno argued that one of the advantages of filmmaking through using 'animation' (he felt it was more accurate in the case of Royal Space Force to speak instead of the advantages of using 'pictures') was the fine degree of control it permitted the creator as a tool for presenting images, and that the high level of detail in the film was not for the sake of imitating live action, but for the conceptual goal of conveying a notion of reality. Anno in fact maintained his concern as an artist on the film was for the "image" (Note: Anno expressed this idea with the word eizou (映像), the same term used by Eizouken, the anime filmmakers of the eponymous 2020 TV series Keep Your Hands Off Eizouken!.) rather than the "anime" per se, and that he made a conscious decision not to work in such "so-called animation", as he felt it would be inappropriate for Royal Space Force: "All I can say to people who want to see something more anime-like on their screen is that they should watch other anime."

=== Role of computers in production and deleted scene ===
Although Royal Space Force was essentially a pre-digital animated work using layers of physical cels and backgrounds painted by hand, computers played an important role in its production. Scheduling and accounting on the film was performed using a Fujitsu OASYS100, while design drawings were scanned into a NEC PC-9801 which permitted them to be studied at different rotations and for possible color options, using a 256-color palette. Rough draft animation of line drawings testing how sequences would work utilized a Quick Action Recorder computer-controlled video camera, a technology by that point common in the anime industry. Computer-assisted animation seen onscreen in Royal Space Force was used for certain difficult motion shots, including the contra-rotating propellers of the Honnêamise air force plane, the rotation of the space capsule while in orbit, the tilted wheel turn of the street sweeper, and the swing of the instrument needle in the launch control bunker. The motions themselves were rendered using ASCII 3D software, and then traced onto cels. By contrast, Ryusuke Hikawa noted that the flakes of frost falling from the rocket at liftoff, which might be assumed to be a CG effect, were done entirely by hand under the supervision of Hideaki Anno.

A one-minute scene of Shiro and Marty conversing on the bed of a truck delivering the Royal Space Force's electromechanical computer, originally meant to precede Shiro's first training run in the capsule simulator, was scripted and animated for the film's B part, but was not included in the theatrical release. The scene was cut for reasons of length before it reached the audio recording stage; however, the 1990 Royal Space Force~The Wings of Honnêamise Memorial Box LaserDisc edition, described by Animage as a kodawari (committed to perfection) project of Bandai co-producer Shigeru Watanabe, would reassemble the film's sound team and voice actors Leo Morimoto and Kazuyuki Sogabe, and record the dialogue and sound effects for the scene. This one-minute scene would also be included on subsequent DVD and Blu-ray editions of Royal Space Force.

=== 1986 and after: the animation process and retrospective ===
In January 1986, Toho-Towa agreed to distribute Royal Space Force as a feature film, and production assumed a more frantic pace, as the process of in-betweening, cel painting, and background painting began at this time; additional staff was recruited via advertisements placed in anime magazines. Gainax relocated its studio once again, this time from Takadanobaba to a larger studio space in the Higashi-cho neighborhood of Kichijoji, where the remainder of Royal Space Force would be produced. Following the C part of the film, the animation production proceeded in order from the A part (the opening scene through the fight in the air force lounge), to the B part (the arrival at the rocket factory through the funeral for Dr. Gnomm), then to the concluding D part (the General's talk on history to the film's ending). The daily exchange of ideas between Yamaga and the other staff at Gainax continued during production, as the artists attempted to understand his intentions, and Yamaga requested that animation drawings, designs, and background paintings to be re-done in order to get closer to the "image in his head;" the film's artists also exchanged opinions on the images between themselves. Many of the staff of Royal Space Force had also worked on two of the major anime film projects released in 1986: Project A-ko and Castle in the Sky, including Royal Space Force's assistant director Masuo and animation director Yuji Moriyama on A-ko; design artist and key animator Mahiro Maeda had worked on Castle in the Sky, as did Noriko Takaya, who had earlier developed for its director Hayao Miyazaki the "harmony" method used to portray the shifting carapace of the Ohm in Nausicaä; the technique would be used also for the rocket nozzles in Royal Space Force. (Note: Akai notes that the heroine of Gainax's 1988–1989 OVA series Gunbuster was named after the artist. In traditional cel animation, the impression of movement is created with a sequence of images painted onto transparent acetate cels, each separate cel image differing in position from the previous cel. Each cel is individually photographed against a background image visible beneath the transparent portion of the cel, so that when the photos are run as a sequence, the cel images simulate the appearance of an object moving against the background. Takaya's method, instead of using a sequence of separate animation cels, created movement within a unified "harmony layer" where the object intended to move was constructed as one single assembly made from flat overlapping cutout pieces, each piece mounted individually on an elastic strip; the strip was pulled, and the resulting motion of the parts filmed. Miyazaki's assistant on Nausicaä, Kazuyoshi Katayama, compared the technique to a bellows, remarking that the varying levels of elastic tension along the parts of the assembly conveyed a distinct sense of dimension and mass to the motion depicted. The larger concept of "harmony" in cel animation encompassed conveying touches, shadings, and gradations of the kind associated with oils or watercolors that were not necessarily expressible through the acrylic paints traditionally used to color cels directly; therefore the harmony technique would, for example, paint only the black outlines of the animated object on the transparent cel, conveying the animated object's color via a separate painted layer underneath the cel. A "harmony" layer could also incorporate additional imagery created by background artists that were trimmed into shapes and attached to the cels.) By the summer of 1986, both works were completed, and a large number of their crew joined the production of Royal Space Force, which by that point was running on a round-the-clock schedule.

Yamaga would later say of the making of Royal Space Force, "it was like we were all swinging swords with our eyes blindfolded". Akai and Yamaga remarked that since they weren't "animation purists," they altered the animation drawings, cels, and timesheets in ways that were not traditional industry practice, to the extent that "the young people who followed in our footsteps in creating anime thought that was how it was done," speculating that they may have created new traditions for anime by breaking the old on the production of Royal Space Force. The idea that Royal Space Force would not use anime's traditional division of labor and strictly assigned roles was developed while it was still in the pre-production stage. Masuo compared Gainax's production system to putting on a school festival, with everyone sharing ideas and participating wherever they could. Higuchi laughed that while as assistant director he supervised with a "blueprint" of what the film would be like, there were times when the finished work turned out to be completely different, and he thought, "Oh..." In 1995, Okada reflected that the film "was made in that kind of chaos ... On a Gainax anime project, everyone has to be a director. Therefore, everyone's feelings and everyone's knowledge are going into it ... That's the good side of how Gainax's films are different from others. But we have no strong director, and that's the weak side." On the director's commentary, Yamaga himself noted that when the film's final retakes were done at the end of 1986, out of 100 adjustments made to scenes, only three were based on the director's own suggestions. (Note: In an interview conducted on January 25, 1987, Yamaga had however commented that "I haven't yet finished all the retakes. During the initial screening, I broke into a cold sweat every time I saw a retake. It's hard to think that we've still got to retake nearly 300 cuts.") Akai had personally rejected other change requests by Yamaga on the basis of representing the opinions of the entire staff and making sure that "everyone was being heard". Yamaga replied, "I was just pleased that everyone was so involved in the project. I hadn't expected that to happen. It was a wonderful time. At the beginning, I was expected to make all the decisions, but as time went by, the staff started to understand that I wasn't going to make all the decisions and that they were going to have to get involved. By the end of the project, nobody cared what I had to say ... I thought that was great."
