= Dope sheet =

Dope sheet may refer to:

- Dope sheet (animation), a planning sheet for animators, also applied to the content of TV programmes
- Scratch sheet, a publication listing betting odds on horses participating in horse racing
- The Dope Sheet, the press release and game program for the Green Bay Packers, originally written in the 1920s by George Whitney Calhoun
