= Drakon (novel) =

1996 science fiction novel by S. M. Stirling

- Author: S. M. Stirling
- Language: English
- Series: The Domination
- Genre: Dystopian, Alternate history, Novel
- Published: January 1, 1996
- Publisher: Baen Books
- Publication place: United States
- Media type: Print (paperback)
- Pages: 399
- ISBN: 0-671-87711-9
- OCLC: 45469967
- LC Class: CPB Box no. 1849 vol. 5
- Preceded by: The Stone Dogs
- Followed by: Drakas!

Drakon is a science fiction novel by Canadian-American writer S. M. Stirling, the fourth novel in the alternate history series The Domination. The novel was released in the United States on January 1, 1996.

== Plot introduction ==
Set centuries since the last war between the Domination and the Alliance, the Domination has conquered the Earth and the Solar System, while the Alliance survivors have fled to the Alpha Centauri star system where they have started a new civilization called the United States of Samothrace.

The two societies have traded technology and skirmished some, focusing most of their efforts on colonizing all new habitable worlds they discover. Space combat has been rare since faster-than-light (FTL) travel formerly has been impossible. Combat only occurred when colonists from both sides reached the same world, an incident that happened only once. (Stirling later said the Samothracians won due to their superior ship.) The Draka continued their enslaving any new intelligent species they discover, using genetic engineering to produce a meek and submissive version of it.

== Plot ==
The book starts in 2442 A.D. somewhere in North America – thinly inhabited and with scattered remnants of the Americans having been quite literally bombed into the Stone Age – where Gwendolyn Ingolfsson is ending a camping and hunting trip. On her way back to the civilization she contacts legate Tamirindus Rohm, who sends her to the Reichart Station to oversee the creation of a wormhole generator. During a test of the generator an error occurs and before she can get clear she is caught by the wormhole and is sent to an alternate Earth, called Earth/2. The event is detected by the USSNF President Douglas, which is an FTL starship of the United States of Samothrace utilizing wormhole technology and is positioned a tenth of a lightyear outside Pluto.

Gwendolyn lands in a warehouse where a drug deal is taking place between 22 persons. They notice her and try to kill her, but she kills all of them instead and steals their money. Detective Henry Carmaggio arrives later on the crime scene where he learns that most of the victims died from blunt trauma or as a result of cutting blows from a bladed weapon honed to an unnatural sharpness. They also find an arm that does not belong to any of the victims and appears to be from an animal.

Meanwhile, Gwendolyn tries to figure out where she has ended up and learns that she is in New York City in 1995. She quickly learns that not only did she travel back in time but also to a parallel Earth, one where the Domination of the Draka never existed. She hides out for a while in various apartments, after killing the owners. Carmaggio is constantly one step behind and during his interviews with the victims' acquaintances he meets Jennifer Feinberg.

Gwendolyn decides that she needs to figure out a way to contact her Earth (Earth/1). In an effort to make her stolen drug money look legitimate she decides to go to Cali, Colombia where she recruits her first followers. Gwendolyn also starts a company named IngolfTech to use as a front to sell high technology to raise the capital necessary to build the equipment necessary to contact her Earth.

During the same time Kenneth Lafarge comes to Earth/2, ending up in a cornfield somewhere in Illinois. He starts with trying to contact the CIA, explaining why he is there and who Gwendolyn is, but everyone thinks he is insane and he is forced to fight his way out. However, this makes Carmaggio look deeper into Gwendolyn and her business, but he still cannot do much. At the same time he and Jennifer Feinberg start to develop a relationship.

Jennifer follows her boss and a few other co-workers down to the Bahamas where IngolfTech's headquarters is located. Lafarge learns about Gwendolyn's location and also travels there, attempting a sneak attack on her headquarters. He is forced to retreat, however, when he is unable to fight off both the security and Gwendolyn herself.

Lafarge returns to New York and contact Carmaggio and explains everything to him. Carmaggio agrees to help him stop Gwendolyn and recruits some of his colleagues as well. Lafarge provides them with a small number of plasma rifles he has built with local technology.

Gwendolyn returns to New York and buys the warehouse where she first came to Earth/2 and the area around it. She intends to open up a wormhole there and let through large numbers of soldiers from her timeline to take over Earth/2. During a brief contact with Earth/1, she learns the Samothracians attacked Earth but were beaten back "only just." Both Carmaggio and Lafarge decide that this is their best and only chance they have to stop Gwendolyn. They attack the warehouse and fight Gwendolyn and her security forces. Lafarge and Gwendolyn battle, damaging the wormhole generator and making it explode. Only Carmaggio and Jennifer survive.

Afterwards Carmaggio and Jennifer marry and take over IngolfTech, thanks to Lafarge hacking Gwen's records and creating a fake will. At the same time, two of Gwendolyn's followers are traveling under the sea in a secret submarine and with them a cloned baby of Gwendolyn.

== Main characters ==
- Detective Lieutenant Henry Carmaggio: The main protagonist of the story, he is a detective at the NYPD whose investigation of Gwen's first murder leads him into doing everything in his power to prevent Gwen from conquering the Earth. After Gwen's death he becomes the owner of IngolfTech and decides to sell the advanced technology brought to this Earth by Gwen.
- Gwendolyn Ingolfsson: A genetically engineered Draka and the main antagonist, she is accidentally sent to Earth/2 when supervising construction of a wormhole generator. She tries to recontact her Earth to bring about the conquest of Earth/2.
- Kenneth Lafarge: A Samothrace agent, sent to Earth/2 to stop Gwendolyn, teams up with Henry Carmaggio. Distant relative to Chantal Lefarge (Under the Yoke) and Frederick and Marya Lefarge (The Stone Dogs)
- Jennifer Feinberg: Work colleague of one of Gwendolyn's victims, she later starts to have feelings for Henry Carmaggio and the two marry at the end of the novel.

== Postscript ==
A framing device included in the collected edition, The Domination, is set several years after the events of Drakon. By that time Carmaggio is the wealthiest man in the world and is living in an orbital habitat. In the story he introduces a young scientist in his employ to the company's real secret: that they are reverse engineering technology instead of making new discoveries and that he hopes to allow them to advance Earth technology to be able to stave off a Draka attack, “because out there, they’re still waiting. They know we’re here, and they’re hungry”.
