= Marching Through Georgia (novel) =

1988 novel by S. M. Stirling

- Author: S. M. Stirling
- Cover artist: Kevin Davies
- Language: English
- Series: The Domination
- Genre: Dystopian, alternate history
- Publisher: Baen Books
- Publication date: May 1, 1988
- Publication place: United States
- Media type: Print (paperback)
- Pages: 205 p.
- ISBN: 0-671-72069-4
- Followed by: Under the Yoke

Marching Through Georgia is an alternate history novel by American writer S. M. Stirling, the first of four books in the series The Domination. The novel was released in the United States on May 1, 1988.

The novel also attempts to educate the reader on the background of the Domination. Government, military, social structures, and the historical development of the Draka are all outlined in the book.

The paperback edition contains the full version of Stirling's story. A hardcover version containing all three books of the trilogy was released, however it is abridged.

== Plot ==
The story starts with Centurion Eric von Shrakenberg in a cargo airplane with his airborne unit and the embedded American correspondent William Dreiser, on their way to their drop point, where they will jump and parasail into Nazi-controlled Georgia. The Nazis have been much more successful than in our history, since the Soviets had to divert resources from the rest of the nation to defend their southern border against the possibility of Draka attack. As a result, the Nazis managed to overrun European Russia. The Soviet Union has been pushed back and only controls territories east of the Ural Mountains. However, the Germans are seriously overstretched, and vulnerable to a strong counterattack. During the travel to their drop zone, Eric thinks back on his past and his relationship with his father, Arch Strategos Karl Von Shrakenberg, and his most recent visit home to see his family. This was the first visit in several years, with him having been previously exiled from the family estate due to his arranging the escape of his serf-born daughter to America. Eric's bravery in the earlier Draken conquest of Italy led to his former "mistake" being publicly forgiven, though the Draka’s Security Directorate continues to keep a close eye on him.

Eric's "Century" (a term derived from the Roman Empire's army) ends up being seriously under-supplied because the gliders with the artillery land inside of a canyon. The engineers are frantically building a rubble ramp, but the heavy weapons won't be available in time for the battle. The story details how Eric's single infantry company takes and holds a small village strategically located on the crucial Ossetian Military Highway over the Caucasus Mountains. The balance of the First Airborne Legion is the plug which is holding four German divisions from escaping the trap they are in on the south side of the mountains. Eric's unit is tasked with holding the highway and village against repeated attacks by Felix Hoth's Waffen-SS armored regiment, which is fighting to clear the highway so the German divisions can escape. Eric's company manages to hold out long enough for the Draka to crush the four divisions, cross the mountains, and relieve his unit. Holding this highway and village is the critical act of the invasion of Russia. This allows the Draka's essentially undamaged and superior armored and mechanized units to penetrate into the plains of Southern Russia, where they can bring to battle and destroy the overstretched and exhausted German forces. It also leads to Eric being awarded the Domination's highest medal of valor, the aurora, "for saving 10,000 Citizen lives," and which makes him immune to Security Directorate reprisals for his "treasonous utterances" or for his earlier "indiscretion." The action of Century A is the pivotal event at the beginning of the invasion of Russia that allows the Domination to eventually win the Eurasian War.

The book concludes with Eric gunning down Chiliarch McWhirter, an agent of Skull House and the Security Directorate, along with his retinue after a tense stand off following the final battle against the German forces. Eric himself delivers the final blow to the fallen “Head-Hunter,” remarking that for all his faults, he's still a Von Shrakenberg, and a Draka above all, before pulling the trigger.

== Main characters ==
- Eric von Shrakenberg: Is the main protagonist of the book. He is a Centurion of Century A in the 1st Airborne Legion. He's the son of Karl and Mary von Shrakenberg, the younger brother of Johan, older brother to Johanna von Shrakenberg, and he has two other twin sisters named Eva and Ava; both his mother and brother died prior to the start of the book. He was born and raised on the family plantation south of the Draka capital Archona in 1917. He and Century A, as part of 1st Airborne, are sent behind enemy lines in Nazi controlled Georgia to disrupt the Germans and make way for the main army. Prior to the book he had a secret intimate relationship with a serf girl named Tyansha; he later helps their daughter Anna flee to America, which attracted attention from the Domination's Security Directorate.
- Johanna von Shrakenberg: The four years younger sister of Eric. She is a member of the War Directorate Air Corps and pilots an Eagle class fighter, in the 211th Pursuit Lochos, stationed at Kars. During a mission she is shot down by a Fw 190 and is captured by German troops; she successfully escapes and later makes contact with the Soviet partisans. She has a personal serf named Rahksan, with whom she has a close relationship.
- William Dreiser: American war correspondent. Sent to write about the Draka fighting against the Nazi forces, he is embedded in Eric's Century A by Eric's father Karl, a senior general ("Arch-Strategos") in the Domination’s armed Forces. In addition to being sent to America, Dreiser's reports are also published in Draka military newspapers by Karl's intervention, to make Eric more popular among the Draka Citizens and to make less likely any actions planned by the Security Directorate against Eric. Dreiser seems to be based loosely on William Shirer who also reported from Berlin before the start of World War II.
- Standartenführer Felix Hoth: The Waffen-SS commander in the area where Eric's unit is deployed. He is a skilled but unimaginative commander. He keeps a Russian woman, Valentina Fedorova Budennin, as a personal serving girl and sex slave. She is actually a spy in the employ of the Soviet NKVD.
- Karl Von Shrakenberg: Eric's father, Arch-Strategos in the War Directorate, based in the Draka capital city of Archona (Pretoria, South Africa). Veteran of this timeline's World War I and a member of the Draka General Staff.
- Sofie Nixon: A corporal ("Monitor") and the comtech in Eric's unit. She has a crush on Eric in the beginning of the book that later develops into affection between the two. The book's appendix reports that Eric and Sofie are married after the end of the "Eurasian War," the name of the Draka history's World War II. Her grandfather is a Scottish mercenary and her father works as a foreman on the docks—she's a lower-class Citizen, in contrast to the "Old Domination" Eric.
- Leytenant Valentina Fedorova Budennin: First appearance as a personal serving girl/sex slave for Felix Hoth, turns out to be a Politruk and military intelligence officer in the First Caucasian Partisan Brigade.
- Tyansha: Eric's first serf girl concubine, given to him just after he turned 13. Eric fell deeply in love with her, far more passionately than a Draka Citizen is normally expected or allowed to feel for a serf. After some initial fear, she returned his affection. Eric did not sleep with her for a month after "acquiring" her, prompting the overseer's son to ask to "borrow" her. Eric beat the boy and afterward, Tyansha crawled into his bed. She died giving birth to Eric's daughter, Anna, who was born a serf like her mother. Eric threatened to kill his father after Tyansha's funeral, when Karl attempted to beat Eric for shaming the family by publicly crying at the funeral services.

== Reception ==
Algis Budrys reported that Marching Through Georgia "is not, in other words, a novel at all, and will be a disappointment if you read it with the wrong expectation"; he noted that while it was "interesting," it presented "real battles in an unreal world."

The book's title is derived from the well-known American Civil War song "Marching Through Georgia". Caroline Housmans wrote in her review:

To a reader coming to this book and unexpectedly encountering the highly unpleasant Draka society dreamed up by Mr. Stirling, the title creates a double confusion. First, the Georgia of this book is the Caucasian country rather than the US State of the same name. More fundamentally, the song celebrates troops who fought to emancipate slaves, while the book's Draka troops are fighting to spread and extend slavery, to enslave everybody who is not a Draka. If this is Stirling's idea of a joke, in this commentator's view it is a poor one.
