= Richard Mroz =

American lawyer

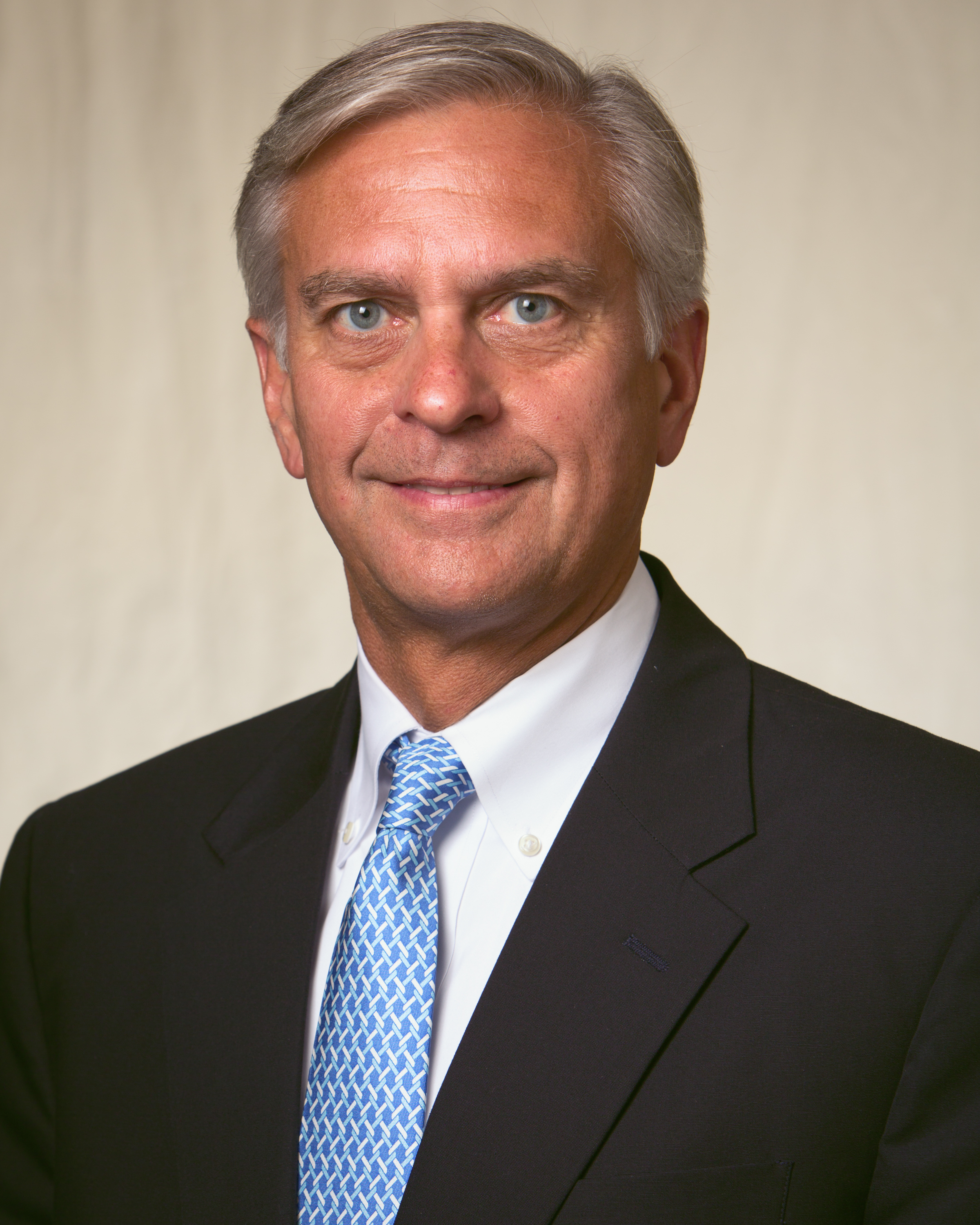

New Jersey Board of Public Utilities President
- In office October 6, 2014 – 2018
- Succeeded by: Joseph Fiordaliso

Personal details
- Party: Republican
- Spouse: Lynne
- Education: B.A. University of Delaware; J.D. Villanova University School of Law
- Occupation: Lawyer

Richard (Rick) Mroz was the president of the New Jersey Board of Public Utilities (BPU) from 2014 to 2018. He is the founder and managing director of Resolute Strategies, LLC and also Senior Director for Strategic & Regulatory Affairs at Archer Public Affairs in Trenton, New Jersey. He has a long career in law and government and is an advocate in securing and making the grid more resilient from cyber and physical attacks. He is an adviser to industry and commentator on energy and security issues.

Governor Chris Christie nominated him to be BPU president on September 18, 2014; the nomination was unanimously approved by the New Jersey Senate on September 22, 2014. As president, Mroz was a member of the Governor's Cabinet. His experiences are as a regulator, lawyer, lobbyist, banker, consultant and thought leader on issues including energy markets & technologies, cybersecurity, water & wastewater policy, and infrastructure development & financing in various industries.

In July 2018, Mroz was appointed by United States Energy Secretary Rick Perry as a member of the USDOE Electric Advisory Committee which provides advice to the department programs and priorities on issues of the evolving grid, distributed energy resources, and reliability of the electric system. He serves on the advisory board to the ClearPath Foundation a Washington, DC based policy organization advocating for policies advancing cleaner energy generation with hydropower, carbon capture, and new nuclear technologies.

Mroz is also senior adviser to Protect Our Power, a national non-industry non-profit advocacy organization supporting best practices and investments in cybersecurity for the energy, utility and critical infrastructure industries. He is a Distinguished Corporate Fellow advising the Global Resilience Institute (GRI) at Northeastern University, Boston, MA on protection and investments necessary to enhance and protect critical infrastructure.

== Biography ==
Mroz grew up in Camden where he attended St. Joseph's High School, graduating with the school's final graduating class in 1979. He received a bachelor's degree at the University of Delaware. After attending the Villanova University School of Law, Mroz clerked for Judge I.V. DiMartino in Camden County Superior Court. He went on to become Camden County counsel from 1992 to 1994 before joining the Administration of Governor Christie Todd Whitman, first as Director of the Authorities Unit and then as Chief Counsel.

Mroz served as counsel to President George W. Bush's New Jersey campaign in 2004, and as the state campaign coordinator for U.S. Sen. John McCain's presidential bid in 2008. He was a policy advisor on Christie's 2009 campaign.

Mroz is a former Commissioner of the Delaware River and Bay Authority and he has Saturday on the Federal Home Loan Bank of New York board.

While Mroz was president of the New Jersey Board of Public Utilities, the BPU published a microgrid report and updated the Energy Master Plan for the State of New Jersey, and New Jersey hit a significant milestone in surpassing 2 gigawatts of installed solar energy capacity.

Mroz was a member of NARUC, where he was the chairman of the Committee on Critical Infrastructure, which focused on helping the industry to combat cybersecurity risks.

Mroz was also the NARUC liaison to the Electric Sector Coordinating Council (ESCC) which leads national efforts in the event of widespread threats or disruptions to the electric system. He was President of the Organization of PJM States, Inc (OPSI) which represents the interests of 13 states and the District of Columbia on electric generation and transmission issues to the regional grid operator. Mroz is also a member of the New Mexico State University Center for Public Utilities Advisory Council.

Rich Mroz is currently a senior advisor to Protect our Power, a nonprofit organization dedicated to strengthening the U.S. power grid.
