= Catbus =

Fictional character in My Neighbor Totoro

- My Neighbor Totoro character
- Catbus with Satsuki inside
- First appearance: My Neighbor Totoro; 1988
- Created by: Hayao Miyazaki
- Voiced by: Naoki Tatsuta; Frank Welker; Carl Macek

Catbus (Japanese: ねこバス, Hepburn: Nekobasu) is a fictional character in the Studio Ghibli film My Neighbor Totoro, directed by Hayao Miyazaki. It is a large, grinning, twelve-legged cat with a large bushy tail and a hollow body that serves as a bus, with windows and seats covered with fur. In the original Japanese version of My Neighbor Totoro, Catbus is voiced by Naoki Tatsuta, and it was voiced by Frank Welker and Carl Macek in the English-language versions.

== Legacy ==
Catbus has gained popular reception since the release of My Neighbor Totoro. It has been described as "one of the most iconic characters from Studio Ghibli" as well as "almost as recognizable as Totoro himself". It has inspired merchandise such as clothing, toys, and a vehicle at Ghibli Park in Nagakute. Additionally, Catbus's baby, Kittenbus, stars in a sequel to My Neighbor Totoro titled Mei and the Kittenbus.

The velvet worm species Eoperipatus totoro was named such due to how the species resembles the Catbus in its elongated, multi-legged appearance.

== See also ==
- List of fictional cats
- List of fictional cats in film
- List of fictional buses
