= St. Joseph's High School (Camden, New Jersey) =

Coordinates: 39.922542°N 75.103773°W

Location
- 1770 Mt. Ephraim Avenue; Camden, New Jersey

Information
- Type: Private, Coeducational
- Religious affiliation: Roman Catholic
- Established: 1946
- Closed: 1979
- Grades: 9-12
- Colors: Red; White
- Newspaper: Impressions
- Yearbook: Cordon

St. Joseph's High School was a four-year private high school founded in 1946 by St. Joseph's Catholic Church, Diocese of Camden, located in Camden, New Jersey, that was closed in 1979 in the face of declining enrollment.

== History ==

The prime mover behind the creation of St. Joseph's High School was Monsignor Arthur B. Strenski, P.A., pastor of St. Joseph's Church from 1934 to 1966.

Initially located on church property at Tenth and Liberty Streets, the high school moved to a new three-story building at 1770 Mt. Ephraim Avenue in 1952. The new school building was designed by Earley & Houwen Associates, and its estimated $1 million cost borne by donors, including Catholic-owned businesses which donated materials and labor. The cornerstone was laid August 8, 1951, and the school formally dedicated November 27, 1952, while the wing containing the cafeteria, auditorium, and gymnasiums was still under construction.

Enrollment peaked at approximately 900 in the late 1950s. Enrollments declined sharply in the 1970s, mirroring Camden's economic reverses and "white flight," and the school closed at the end of the 1978-79 school year.

The school motto was Non Verbis, Sed Virtute (not by word, but by deed).

== Student demographics ==
Like the founding church's membership, the co-ed student body was overwhelmingly white, primarily working-class, and heavily Polish Catholic. St. Joseph's also drew students from nearby communities such as Yorkship Village, Williamstown and Deptford, whose Catholic parishes could support an elementary school but not a high school.

== Student spirit and activities ==
St. Joseph's colors were red and white, the mascot the Bison, the yearbook the Cordon, and the student newspaper the Impressions. A student-created low-power radio station, WSJH-FM, began operation in 1971.

== Academics and accreditation ==
St. Joseph's High School received its initial accreditation in 1949. Throughout its history, curriculum offerings were constrained by both its size and its facilities. Students chose between a college preparatory track, a secretarial track, and a general track. Electives in all three "courses" were limited. Graduation requirements for all students included four years of Religion, English, and Physical Education, and two years of U.S. History.

== Faculty and administration ==
St. Joseph's was initially staffed by members of the Felician Sisters (Congregation of the Sisters of St. Felix Cantalice), a teaching order affiliated with the Order of St. Francis and founded in Warsaw, Poland, in 1855. While priests from area parishes and lay faculty would make substantial contributions, St. Joseph's was heavily dependent on the Felicians throughout its history.

== Sports ==
At various times in its history, St. Joseph's fielded teams in football, cross country, baseball, wrestling, softball, basketball (boys and girls), bowling (boys and girls), and volleyball (girls). St. Joseph's was a member of the New Jersey State Interscholastic Athletic Association, and for most of its history competed as a Parochial Class C school. Traditional rivals were Gloucester Catholic High School, Camden Catholic High School, and Bishop Eustace Preparatory School. The fight song borrowed the tune of the Notre Dame fight song.

Shoehorned into an urban residential neighborhood, St. Joseph's had very limited athletic facilities of its own: a combination gymnasium/auditorium, and a second smaller gym (originally planned as a pool, and used for girls' physical education classes). The football, baseball, and softball teams practiced at the city-owned park on Decatur Avenue, three blocks away.

Football "home" games were played on Camden High School's field. From 1948 through 1978, the varsity squad posted a 79-172-10 record under a succession of twelve head coaches. The high point came under Bill Simmons, as the Bisons posted back-to-back 7-2 seasons in 1965 and 1966.

The boys' basketball team was by far the school's most successful athletic program, including state championships in Parochial B in 1960 and Parochial C in 1977. Before relocating to Mt. Ephraim Avenue, the basketball team played and practiced in the upstairs Parish Hall at 10th and Liberty. Football practices were held at a field located near Everett Street and Broadway. The football and baseball teams practiced on city fields at the end of Dayton Street (Dayton Diamond). Home baseball games were played there.

Note: Whitman Park is located about a mile from where the teams practiced, at Whitman, Rose, Everett and Louis Streets.

== Alumni activities after 1979 ==
Since the closing of St. Joseph's, there has been no official alumni association or official contact person for reunion information.

In 1996, alumnus Michael McDowell ('72) launched The St. Joseph's High School Memorial Free Range Salt Lick as an online resource for St. Joseph's graduates. The Salt Lick spawned independent sites for the Class of 1968 by Frank Piotrowski and Class of 1971 by Elaine Dembicki.

In 2006, the efforts of alumnus Kathy Slupski ('61) led to the establishment of a St. Joseph's High School Official Alumni Site—a place for all reunion information for all graduation years.

== Notable alumni ==
- Richard Mroz, President of the New Jersey Board of Public Utilities.

== Sources ==
- St. Joseph's High School Official Alumni Site, 2006–present
- The St. Joseph's High School Memorial Free Range Salt Lick, 1996-2006
- Cordon, 1953–1979
- Impressions, 1968–1972
- St. Joseph's Polish Church
