= Drakas! =

2000 anthology by S. M. Stirling

- Author: S. M. Stirling
- Cover artist: Stephen Hickman
- Language: English
- Series: The Domination
- Genre: Dystopian alternate history
- Publisher: Baen Books
- Publication date: October 31, 2000
- Publication place: United States
- Pages: 384
- ISBN: 0-671-31946-9
- Followed by: Drakon

Drakas! is a science fiction anthology, containing stories set in S. M. Stirling's alternate history series The Domination. The anthology was released in the United States on October 31, 2000.

== Contents ==
=== Custer Under the Baobab ===
Written by: William Sanders

Centurion George Armstrong Custer, former Lieutenant colonel in the United States Army, was dishonorably discharged from the U.S. Army for cowardice in battle for not attacking a group of Sioux. He finds himself in the Dominion of Draka, where he is brought into the Kalahari Mounted Police by J.E.B. Stuart and he is asked to do a final mission, he is ordered to hunt down a group of bushmen who have killed a white Draka farmer with a lochos consisting of old Confederate soldiers.

=== Hewn in Pieces for the Lord ===
Written by John J. Miller

Charles George Gordon, once field marshal in both the Ottoman Empire and China, finds himself in Draka controlled Alexandria, where he tries to achieve The Plan, a plan to dam the Nile river and make it the longest navigable waterway in the world, and in order to do so seeks help from the prominent Alexander von Shrakenberg. Alexander von Shrakenberg provides him with a counter offer, defeat the rebellious Mahdi in Sudan, who recently defeated William Hicks' army, and he will make sure Gordon can start his project. Gordon agrees to return to the area he once brought under Ottoman government rule, only to learn he has to find Mahdi before his rival, William Quantrill of the Security Directorate, does.

=== Written by the Wind ===
Written by Roland J. Green

During the Russo-Japanese War, a pair of Draka observers on a Japanese airship are witness to a brutal sea battle.

=== The Tradesmen ===
Written by David Drake

After the end of the Eurasian War (the timeline's version of World War II), a rural Draka outpost in Europe is home to several mercenaries who 'clean up' what remains of the free locals and get paid for every ear of a killed person. In the commander's office, a change of protocol and a coincidence out in the field bring strong personalities against one another in terrible ways, over the debate if killing a child should gain the same reward as for an adult or only a partial payment.

=== The Big Lie ===
Written by Jane Lindskold

Narrated by a sniper who supposedly served with Centurion Von Shrakenberg during the Eurasian War, it is a retelling of the main events of "Marching Through Georgia" with a decidedly cynical and less propagandistic tone.

=== The Greatest Danger ===
Written by Lee Allred

In the Channel Islands, recently passed from Nazi rule to that of the Draka, a relatively enlightened Draka governor tries to avert the inevitable enslavement in store for the islands' British inhabitants. The story discloses that the Dutch-descended Africaners, marginalized by the Draka influx into their country, concentrate in the Draka Navy and tend to be a bit dissident in Draka society. A Draka propaganda film shown during the story documents the terrible fate of the Danish royal family, enslaved in a particularly brutal and humiliating manner in order to "set an example" to all newly made serfs of the Draka.

=== Home is Where the Heart Is ===
Written by William Barton

A Nazi nuclear scientist, kidnapped from Germany after the Eurasian War, seeks to make a life after having been given Draka citizenship. It proves difficult in language, ethics and home life. The story jumps between his field tests of intercontinental missiles and his purchase of, and subsequent domestic encounters with, a serf woman. The story includes the obvious anachronism (from the point of view of our history) of an auction in the slave market in which payment is made with a credit card.

=== The Last Word ===
Written by Harry Turtledove

It is after the nuclear exchange of the Final War and the Draka are landing troops in North Carolina. A group of U.S. military survivors hiding out in an underground bunker in the Appalachian Mountains seek to make the conquest as hard as possible. The story follows Navy Commodore Anson MacDonald as his partisan group makes their last stand against the Draka.

The title has a double meaning. On a literal level, it presents the last stand of any organized resistance to the Draka. In the end MacDonald is cornered, however, and right before biting into a cyanide capsule disguised as false tooth (to avoid being tortured), he pronounced a defiant "last word" to the Draka: they may have conquered all of Earth, but failed to defeat the Alliance's holdings in the outer solar system. Soon the Alliance survivors will leave on an interstellar starship to colonize the Alpha Centauri system. One of the reasons that the Draka pressed the Final War was because even their leadership realized they were doomed to fall behind the Alliance technologically in the long-term: the Draka made some short term advances in the past few generations by ruthlessly exploiting any human resources in their domains, but in the long-term, the rate of scientific advancement in their slavery-based society will stagnate. The Draka cannot hope to achieve interstellar spaceflight capability for generations, while the Alliance colonists safely at Alpha Centauri will rebuild, outpace them technologically, and generations in the future return to take back Earth.

=== A Walk in the Park ===
Written by Anne Marie Talbott

A woman in our timeline has read the Draka novels, and is surprised to see a pair of very Draka-looking individuals walking in the park one day. They turn out to be truly Draka, and an actual encounter with them is far less pleasant than reading the books.

=== Hunting the Snark ===
Written by Markus Baur

A computer scientist working on a face recognition program discovers an anomaly with the results of the analysis of the video stream from a mall. He investigates and finds a bit more than he expected.

=== Upon Their Backs, to Bite 'Em ===
Written by John Barnes

Barnes' own Timeline Wars series had its specific set of nasty villains, coming from a timeline where Carthage won its wars with the Romans. In the crossover story featured here, Barnes' protagonists hatch and carry out the Machiavellian scheme of siccing their own foes and the Draka on each other, in the hope that the two would keep each other busy for a long time - to the relief of everybody else.

=== The Peaceable Kingdom ===
Written by Severna Park

Doctor Hamilton Guye is a psychiatrist working for the Baltimore Police. One day a man named Malik Raun is brought to him, a man of unknown origin and with odd dialect, a man who "show no fear for nothing" except one thing, something called Draka; and where can you find a place where white people speak English like West Africans?
