= The Trigger =

1999 novel by Arthur C. Clarke and Michael P. Kube-McDowell

- Cover of the British first edition
- Authors: Arthur C. Clarke; Michael P. Kube-McDowell
- Cover artist: Fred Gambino
- Language: English
- Genre: Science fiction
- Publisher: Voyager Books (UK); Bantam Spectra (US)
- Publication date: 1999
- Publication place: United Kingdom
- Media type: Print (Hardcover and Paperback)
- Pages: 550 pp
- ISBN: 0-00-224711-9
- OCLC: 59407027

The Trigger is a 1999 science fiction novel by Arthur C. Clarke and Michael P. Kube-McDowell. It is an attempt to explore the social impact of technological change.

== Plot summary ==
The Trigger starts in the early to mid-21st century. A group of scientists invent, by accident, a device that detonates all nitrate-based explosive in its vicinity, thus providing good protection against most known modern conventional weapons. The first half of the book explores the reactions of society, government and the scientists themselves as the latter attempt to ensure that their invention will only be used for peaceful ends. Although at first beneficial, other uses for the device are found, such as a faultless at-range detonator. The novel also traces the scientists' slow progress in understanding the science behind their invention. The second half of the book begins when the science is sufficiently well understood that a second device can be built – one that does not detonate explosives, but merely renders them permanently harmless. The story ends with the scientists discovering that the hyperdimensional impulse wave can be set to scramble extremely specific DNA – making the device a killer.
