= The Stone Dogs =

1990 science fiction novel by S. M. Stirling

- Cover of first edition
- Author: S. M. Stirling
- Cover artist: Paul Alexander
- Language: English
- Series: The Domination
- Genre: Dystopian, Alternate history
- Publisher: Baen Books
- Publication date: 1990
- Publication place: United States
- Media type: Print (Paperback)
- Pages: 522
- ISBN: 0-671-72009-0
- OCLC: 22293165
- Preceded by: Under the Yoke
- Followed by: Drakon

The Stone Dogs is a science fiction novel by Canadian-American writer S. M. Stirling, the third book in the alternate history series, The Domination. It was first published in paperback by Baen Books in August 1990. It was a preliminary nominee for the 1996 Prometheus Hall of Fame Award.

The novel details the life of Eric von Shrakenberg's niece, Yolande Ingolfsson, and Chantal Lefarge's children, Frederick and Marya. Eric later becomes the Archon during the "Final War".

== Plot summary ==
During the Cold War between the Alliance and the Domination, Frederic and Marya work for the OSS as spies and assassins.

During the Draka conquest of India, Marya Lefarge is taken prisoner. She becomes a serf to Yolande Ingolfsson, who after torturing her repeatedly with a neural weapon, forces her to become a "brooder" (i.e. a surrogate mother) for her offspring, Gwendolyn. Yolande also swears vengeance on Fred Lefarge after he kills her lover, Myfanwy Venders, during the Indian Incident.

As both superpowers expand into space, they prepare different doomsday weapons. The Alliance's weapon is a computer virus ("comp plague") secretly planted in Draka military computers by spies; the Draka's is a biological virus called the Stone Dogs that causes infected personnel to go insane. Yolande discovers Marya, who has contacted the OSS, planting the comp-plague and allows her to escape with knowledge of the Stone Dogs. This forces her uncle, Archon Eric von Shrakenberg, to use the weapon prematurely. The Draka win the resulting conflict; however, their incomplete victory leads to Eric negotiating an arrangement whereupon the Alliance is allowed to launch its generation ship "The New America" and the remaining Alliance survivors in space are granted limited Draka citizenship.
