= Michael P. Kube-McDowell =

American writer (born 1954)

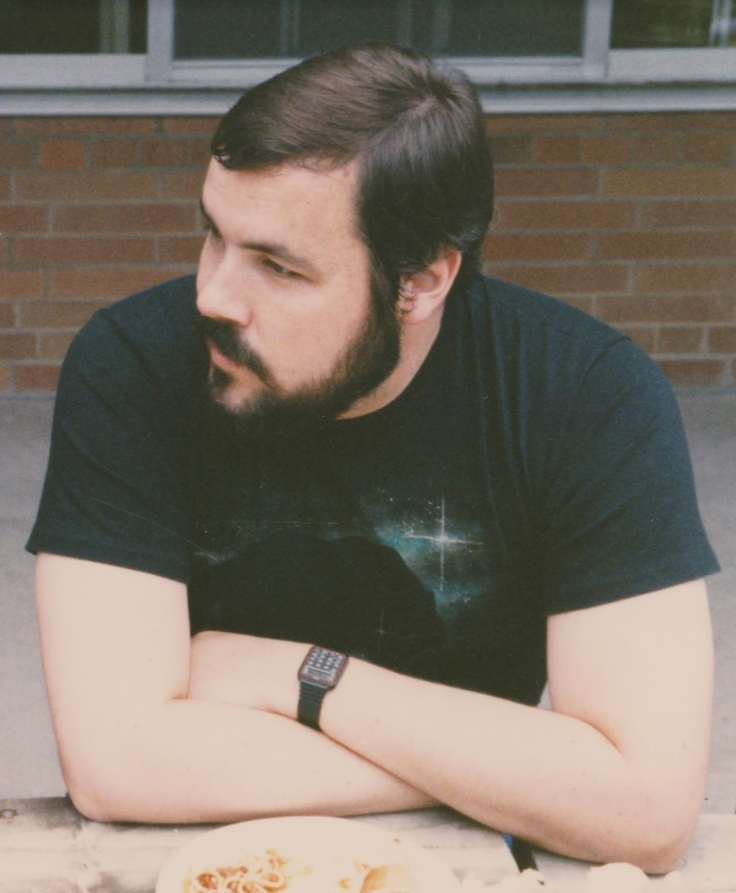
- Kube-McDowell at the Clarion Workshop in the summer of 1989
- Born: Michael Paul McDowell; August 29, 1954 (age 72); Philadelphia, Pennsylvania, U.S.
- Education: St. Joseph's High School; Michigan State University
- Occupation: Author
- Writing career
- Genres: Science fiction; non-fiction
- Notable awards: Pegasus Award (1994)
- Website: alternities.com/wp/

Michael Paul Kube-McDowell (born August 29, 1954), also known as Michael McDowell or Michael P. McDowell, is an American author of science fiction and non-fiction.

== Background ==
Born Michael Paul McDowell on August 29, 1954 (Philadelphia, Pennsylvania), he attended St. Joseph's High School (Camden, New Jersey) (Class of 1972) and Michigan State University.

== Writing career ==
Kube-McDowell has written for television, been a stringer for a daily newspaper, and published short fiction, reviews, assorted nonfiction and erotica. He was honored for teaching excellence by the 1985 White House Commission on Presidential Scholars. Kube-McDowell's short fiction has been featured in Analog, Isaac Asimov's Science Fiction Magazine and The Magazine of Fantasy and Science Fiction, as well as anthologies After the Flames and Perpetual Light. Three of his stories have been adapted as episodes of the TV series Tales from the Darkside. Outside of science fiction Kube-McDowell is the author of more than 500 nonfiction articles on subjects ranging from space careers to "scientific creationism" to an award-winning four-part series on the state of American education. Kube-McDowell's literary works have been recognized and highlighted at Michigan State University in their Michigan Writers Series.

== Bibliography ==
=== Series ===
==== The Trigon Disunity ====
- Emprise (1985)
- Enigma (1986)
- Empery (1987)

==== Star Wars: The Black Fleet Crisis ====
- Before the Storm (1996)
- Shield of Lies (1996)
- Tyrant's Test (1996)

=== Stand-alone novels ===
- Alternities (1988)
- Isaac Asimov's Robot City: Odyssey (1987)
- The Quiet Pools (1990)
- Exile (1992)
- The Trigger (1999) (with Arthur C. Clarke)
- Vectors (2002)

=== Young Adult novels ===
- Thieves of Light (1987) (writing as Michael Hudson)

=== Short stories ===
- I Shall Have a Flight to Glory (1992) (collected in Mike Resnick's alternate history anthology Alternate Presidents)
- The Inga-Binga Affair (1992) (collected in Mike Resnick's alternate history anthology Alternate Kennedys)
- Because Thou Lovest the Burning-Ground (1993) (collected in Mike Resnick's alternate history anthology Alternate Warriors)

== Awards ==
- Hugo Best Novel nominee (1991) : The Quiet Pools
- Philip K. Dick nominee (1985) : Emprise
- Pegasus Award for Best Performer (1994) as a member of the Black Book Band
