= The Domination =

Dystopian alternate history series by S. M. Stirling

The Domination of Draka series
- Cover image of first novel in the series
- Marching Through Georgia (1988); Under the Yoke (1989); The Stone Dogs (1990); Drakon (1996); Drakas! (anthology) (2000)
- Author: S. M. Stirling
- Country: Canada / America
- Language: English
- Genre: Science fiction, Dystopian, Alternate history
- Publisher: Baen Books
- Published: May 1988 – January 1996
- Media type: Print (hardback & paperback)
- No. of books: 4
- Followed by: Nantucket series

The Domination of the Draka (also called the Draka series or the Draka saga) is a dystopian science fiction alternate history series by American author S. M. Stirling.

The series comprises a main trilogy of novels as well as one crossover novel set after the original and a book of short stories.

The series focuses on Draka (later The Domination), a totalitarian, expansionist nation founded in Southern Africa by British settlers in the 18th century where an especially cruel manifestation of a slavery-regime plays an increasingly central role.

== Novels ==
Book #	Title	US/CAN release	UK release	ISBN
1	Marching Through Georgia	May 1, 1988	February 1991	ISBN 0-671-72069-4
A Draka airborne unit attempts to hold a mountain pass against the Germans in Ossetia as the Domination launches its invasion of Nazi-occupied Europe.
2	Under the Yoke	September 1, 1989	December 31, 1991	ISBN 0-671-69843-5
The Draka reshape Europe by turning the surviving population into serfs. Meanwhile an American agent infiltrates Draka society in an effort to gain contact with various resistance organizations.
3	The Stone Dogs	July 1, 1990	January 1, 1997	ISBN 0-671-72009-0
The long-standing protracted struggle between the Domination of the Draka and the Alliance for Democracy turns hot when the Draka unleash a new secret weapon.
4	Drakon	January 1, 1996	June 7, 1999	ISBN 0-671-87711-9
When an experiment goes wrong a female Draka is hurled into a parallel Earth and now seeks to pave the way for an invasion force.

Anthologies
Book #	Title	US/CAN release	ISBN
1	The Domination	May 31, 1999	ISBN 0-671-57794-8
An omnibus edition of the Draka Saga was published in 1999, containing the first trilogy, Marching Through Georgia, Under the Yoke and The Stone Dogs.
2	Drakas!	October 31, 2000	ISBN 0-671-31946-9
In 2000, Stirling edited Drakas!, a collection of short stories by other authors who develop plots based on the Domination premise.

== Fictional universe ==
The world of the Domination diverges when the Dutch Republic joins the American Revolutionary War two years earlier than in our history and is forced to cede the Cape Colony to the British following a resounding defeat. Renamed after Francis Drake, the newborn Crown Colony of Drakia (later Dominion and finally Domination of the Draka) becomes a haven for displaced American loyalists, Hessian mercenaries, Icelandic refugees, and French royalists fleeing the French Revolution. In an additional divergence, Patrick Ferguson is only wounded and not killed at the Battle of Kings Mountain and later moves to Drakia, where he is successful in having the new settlers adopt his Ferguson rifle.

The new settlers rapidly assimilate the earlier Boer population. With their greater numbers, the higher firepower of the Ferguson rifle, and later augmented by German and Confederate expatriates, they overrun and enslave the native population. With its capital at Archona, the Draka develop into a militaristic slave-owning society controlled by a hereditary plantation slavocracy. Other societal groups include a technocratic subclass of industrialists, a small Boer-dominated navy, and a secret police known as the Security Directorate; controlled by Confederate immigrant families out of “Skull House.”

Draka culture draws heavy inspiration from the Mughal Empire as well as classical antiquity. English is the only legally spoken language, and the Draka accent is described as being difficult for foreigners to imitate, with some Afrikaans influence. The economy is heavily dominated by cartels known as Combines, though there is also a considerable small-business private sector. The Draka currency is gold-backed known as the Auric.

The majority of the Domination’s free population owns at least one or two slaves. Indeed, subject races are estimated to comprise 90% of the Domination’s population; slaves, or “Serfs,” have no rights and are thus viewed less as living beings and more as expendable fodder, to be used for a variety of purposes. Politically, the Domination is ruled by a parliament of elected senators chosen by the Citizens through a fair vote, which in turn conduct a vote among themselves to appoint an “Archon,” or head of state, who serves for a seven year term. Citizens have a considerable degree of free speech, but any fundamental criticism of the State or the slave system is forbidden.

While originally, serfs were black Africans and citizenship was open to all white individuals, the Draka eventually began to see themselves as the one true Master Race; all non-Draka existed now as threats to be subjugated. Due to a societal fixation on military training from infancy, Draka citizen soldiers are depicted as being the equal of several elite enemy soldiers in combat; they give no quarter in battle and all prefer death to capture. The rest of the army is filled out by slave troops, known as Janissaries, who are less well-equipped but still formidable. Having leveraged conquered natural resources to offer research grants and incentives, Draka technology is shown to progress more rapidly than technology in reality; their military equipment is several decades ahead of their opponents, and by later books in the series includes genetically modified animals, combat spacecraft, and advanced computer viruses.

Over the course of the 19th century, the Draka conquer and enslave all of Africa, starting with Egypt during the Napoleonic Wars and ending with the Congo. Other world powers are likewise much more expansionist in this timeline, with Brazil seizing much of South America, Gran Colombia never breaking up, and the United States eventually annexing all of North America as well as Spain's Caribbean and Pacific possessions. Massive Draka aid to the Confederacy fails to avert a Union victory in the American Civil War. The Taiping Rebellion succeeds, but a weakened China soon cedes large territories and eventually becomes a protectorate of Japan. Joining the Allies of World War I, the Draka seize Ottoman and Bulgarian lands and then much of Central Asia from China, Afghanistan, and the collapsing Russian Empire.

== Plot summary ==
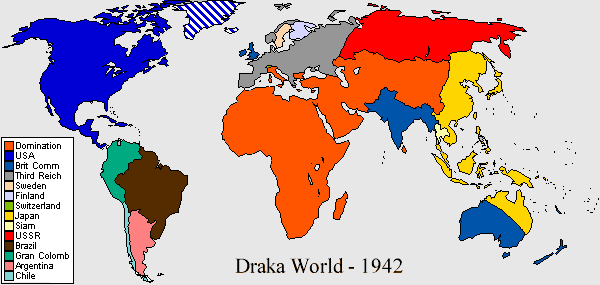
The Draka world in 1942

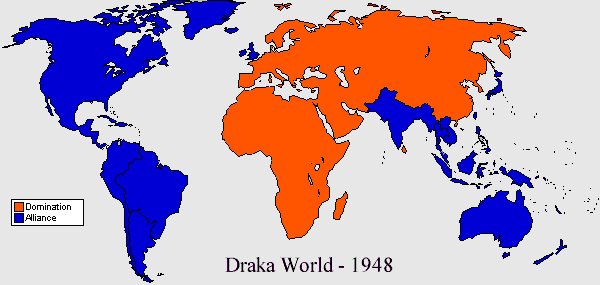
The Draka world in 1948

The first book of the series, Marching Through Georgia, is set during the "Eurasian War." The Soviet Union, weakened by civil war and overstretched from reinforcing their borders with the Domination, collapses to the Nazi invasion before a Draka attack falls on the German army in the Caucasus. While both sides' weaponry is somewhat more advanced than in our reality, with jet and rocket aircraft and advanced armored vehicles, that of the Draka proves superior. Since most European countries are loath to unite behind the Germans after the atrocities of the Nazi Party, the Draka are eventually able to conquer all of mainland Europe. Meanwhile, having already subdued what remained of China, Japanese forces are able to concentrate on the United States, seizing its Pacific possessions and raiding North America. The U.S. does not open a second front in Europe and eventually turns the tide against Japan. The Draka invade Japanese-occupied China and Korea, and the war ends in 1945 with multiple German and Japanese cities and bases destroyed by nuclear weapons. The remaining free countries of the world join the Alliance for Democracy, with the United Kingdom inundated with refugees and heavily fortified against any potential Draka attack.

The second book, Under the Yoke, depicts Europe under Draka rule. The Draka, having long applied modern science to the practice of slavery, ruthlessly crush any resistance and obliterate old institutions. Their methods even include the use of a thermonuclear weapon on the rebelling city of Barcelona. The third book, The Stone Dogs, depicts the cold war between the Draka and the Alliance, known as the Protracted Struggle, which is fought mostly on interplanetary colonies throughout the inner Solar System. The Alliance also intensifies its efforts to recruit Draka defectors, of which there are few. The Draka, due to their willingness to sacrifice human life for scientific gain, leapfrog the Alliance in biotech considerably, leading to the creation of the first transgene animals-the Ghouloons: part Gelada Baboon, part canine, part hunting cat, part human (for somewhat intelligence opposable thumbs) the Ghouloons are added to the Draka ranks as loyal guardians and shock troops, to the disgust of the Alliance.

In the 1970s, the exposure of an Alliance covert operation against a Hindu nationalist party leads to India formally seceding from the Alliance, only to be conquered and enslaved by the Draka within less than a week. Even so, long-term trends are depicted as favoring the Alliance; its larger economy and free population give it an advantage in physics and computer research. Both sides engineer a superweapon for the expected Final War; the Alliance creates a sophisticated computer virus which causes any Draka war machines to self destruct should they go to war-footing, while also secretly constructing a starship known as the New America, ready to escape to Alpha Centauri in the event of total defeat.

The Draka have more advanced biological sciences; by experimenting on slave subjects, Draka geneticists eventually develop a virus known as "The Stone Dogs," a heavily derived strain of HIV which can induce homicidal madness in those affected, which they infect most of the Alliances leadership with. To prevent losing the virus's secrecy following a breach in security, the Domination uses it preemptively on the Alliance in a surprise attack. In the resulting war, costing hundreds of millions of lives on both sides, the Alliance is narrowly defeated; a truce between Draka Archon Eric Von Shrakenberg and Commander Fredrick LaFarge allows the remaining alliance personnel to launch the starship. The Draka conquer the Earth, now devastated by a years-long nuclear winter. All remaining free humans are enslaved or granted limited Draka citizenship, allowing for their children to eventually vote and join the military.

The Domination eventually imposes “The Final Society,” securing their grip over the Solar System. Soon, baseline humans are hunted to extinction by the newly ascendant Homo Drakensis, who then produce a new variant of the species known as Homo Servus that is genetically tailored for servility, as well as unable to breed with the Draka "Master Race." Only a few isolated groups of baseline humans are said to survive and are kept locked in a Stone Age existence, with their former homelands used as Hunting Preserves by the Draka.

The fourth novel, Drakon, starts in 2442 when research into wormhole technology, or “Molehole” technology, needed to bridge the gap between Earth and the Alliance colony of Samothrace at Alpha Centauri, ends up sending a single Drakensis and a pursuing Alliance cyborg into an alternate 1995–2000 where the Draka never existed. In the original timeline, the Draka barely beat back a wormhole-enabled Alliance assault from Alpha Centauri, while in the alternate timeline, the Cyborg manages to prevent the Draka from reopening the wormhole and invading. Using technology captured from the interlopers, the alternate Earth begins to prepare for the next incursion of the Draka.

== Reception ==
De Witt Douglas Kilgore has described the series as an example of a "thought provoking" work from the military science fiction genre.

Fredric Smoler called the series "eerie", "distressing" and "perhaps the most haunting of dystopian alternate histories", commending Stirling for his courage to portray a dark, alternative scenario that others writers might "recoil from".

=== Criticism ===
Smoler said that series has "produced angry rejections of its plausibility, built on too-confident assertions about the impossibility of economically efficient slavery".

The series has been criticized on the internet for being historically and technologically implausible. When asked about these criticisms in an interview, Stirling answered:

There's a small internet industry of 'proving' that the Domination couldn't happen. I consider this a complement [sic]. How many people go on at great length trying to prove that vampires and werewolves don't exist?

Stirling's use of the Draka as point-of-view characters has led to accusations that he has some sympathy with them (for example, in his entry in The Encyclopedia of Science Fiction), to his dismay. He describes the Draka series as dystopias based on "suppos[ing that] everything had turned out as badly as possible, these last few centuries."

== Analysis ==
Smoler described the Draka's society as populist, racist, hedonistic and post-Christian, and overall, illustrative of "illiberal modernity". Dennis Showalter described Drakan society as "dystopian".

In 2000 the series has inspired an Internet website related to the BDSM subculture, a "Master/slave Registry... that enables Masters to register their slaves by number".
