= Under the Yoke (Stirling novel) =

Novel by S. M. Stirling

- Author: S. M. Stirling
- Language: English
- Series: The Domination
- Genre: Dystopian, Alternate history
- Publisher: Baen Books
- Publication date: September 1, 1989
- Publication place: United States
- ISBN: 0-671-69843-5
- OCLC: 20412565
- Preceded by: Marching Through Georgia
- Followed by: The Stone Dogs

Under the Yoke is a science fiction novel by American writer S. M. Stirling, the second of four books in his alternate history series The Domination. It was first published in the United States on September 1, 1989.

== Plot summary ==
Tanya von Shrakenberg, formerly a Draka tank operator during the Eurasian War, establishes a plantation in the formerly-French Touraine shortly after the Drakan subjugation of Continental Europe. Her slaves include Marya Sokolowska and Chantal Lefarge, formerly a Polish nun and a French Communist respectively.

Fredrick Kustaa, an agent for the Alliance secret service (the OSS), is involved in the effort to keep a resistance movement alive in Finland even as Draka tactics whittle them down. In Finland, he becomes grimly aware of the Dominations tactics, and the life of a rebel in its shadow. He smuggles weapons to the guerillas and later attempts to smuggle out the German professor Ernst Oerbach, who has vital knowledge on nuclear fusion which can be used in the ongoing “Protracted Struggle” between the Domination and the Alliance. Marya Sokolowska is Fred's contact in this second mission, enduring mental and physical abuse at the hands of Tanya as she struggles to maintain her secret. Meanwhile, Chantal is raped by Tanya's husband, Thomas Ingolfsson, and is impregnated with twins; this occurrence nearly drives her to commit suicide in disgust, but after discovering Marya’s part in the OSS conspiracy, she decides to force herself into the fold by threatening to expose the plot to the Landholders. Fred attends a gathering meant to celebrate the birth of Tanya’s twin children while in disguise, but the lie is revealed after he is forced to kill two of the Von Shrakenberg’s favorite Serfs, Big Tom and his daughter Yasmin, in his attempts to access the local radio to call an escape plane. He attempts to flee, but fails, leading to a tense stand-off between the Draka and the American, which ends when Fred reveals that he is in possession of a piece of weapons grade plutonium, set to go off if he or Marya were to die. To save the plantation, and in exchange for allowing Chantal to escape, Tanya’s brother Andrew carries the plutonium down into an underground bunker with Marya and Fred, allowing it to detonate safely at the cost of their own lives.

Chantal manages to escape to the United States of America on a submarine shortly after boarding the plane. In New York City, she gives birth to twins Fred and Marya LeFarge(named after her rescuers), who would later be the protagonists of the next book in the series, The Stone Dogs, and who - though biologically the children of a Draka father - would be staunch enemies of the Domination, and would be considered serfs in Draken Territory.
