= The Trigon Disunity =

The Trigon Disunity is a series of three books written by science fiction author Michael P. Kube-McDowell. Emprise was a Philip K. Dick Award nominee, and placed second in the annual Locus Poll for best first novel. The first edition covers were by Ron Miller.

== The novels ==
=== Emprise ===
In Emprise (1985, ISBN 0-425-07763-2), the world has been devastated by the Food and Fuel Wars turning once-powerful nations into loose groupings of isolated farming communities. Barter has replaced currency, and scientists, blamed for societal collapse, are burned at the stake. Hidden in the Idaho hills, astronomer Allen Chandliss struggles to maintain his primitive radio telescope to search for extraterrestrial intelligence, which he believes can improve life on Earth. After seventeen years a repeating signal is received from Cassiopeia. He sends a message to a group of scientists in England. A race begins to decode the signal and then find the resources to respond to it.

==== Enigma ====
In this second volume, Enigma (1986, ISBN 0-425-08767-0), takes place 150 later. The suspected aliens were, in fact, other humans who had achieved interstellar travel in the distant past.

=== Empery ===
In the third volume (1987, ISBN 0-425-09887-7, the catastrophe that befell the first human interstellar civilisation has been explained. They were destroyed by the alien Mizari from the Ursa Major cluster. The Mizari still present a threat.

== Reception ==
Orson Scott Card praised the trilogy as "fiction that satisfies as much at the story level a it does at the idea level," citing Kube-McDowell's "ability to deal with human beings as political animals."

J. Michael Caparula reviewed Empery in Space Gamer/Fantasy Gamer No. 80. Caparula commented that "Kube-McDowell demonstrates how easily well-meaning representative councils can rapidly degenerate into military bureaucracies. I highly recommend this series."
