= Exposure sheet =

Planning sheet for animators

An exposure sheet (also referred to as camera instruction sheet, dope sheet or X-sheet) is a traditional animation tool that allows an animator to organize their thinking and give instructions to the camera operator on how the animation is to be shot. It consists of five sections, and is a bit longer and a bit narrower, than A4. Every eighth line down is marked thicker than the rest and shows half a foot of film. One second of animation would take three of these sections (hence every line represents 1/24th of a second). Sound breakdown was often done on separate sheets called bar sheets made by the editor, and given to the animator who would transpose them to his dope sheet.

== Layout ==
The typical dope sheet is divided into sections which are separated by many vertical and horizontal lines, the horizontal lines represent one frame of film while the vertical ones separate the sections, for example:

1. The column on the far left is used by the animator to jot down notes on the path of the action and their thoughts about how the action should be visualized.
2. The next column is used to write down any dialog that may be happening in the scene. The sound is split up into its phonetic components and marked down in the frame that it appears in the film.
3. The central section is split up into several smaller columns, each one representing one level of animation. Animation seldom exceeds five levels of acetate cels; any more and they will seriously darken the lower levels. The numbers of the drawings are marked down in the order they are to be shot in while the second last column is for the background.
4. The final column is for camera instructions, giving information for panning, trucking and field size.
5. Finally, at the top of the dope sheet, the animator writes in the sequence number, page number, scene number and scene name.

== See also ==
- Traditional animation
- Animation
- Animation camera
