= David Weber bibliography =

This is the complete list of works by military science fiction and space opera author David Weber.

== Bibliography ==
The first-edition hardcover releases by Baen Books of War of Honor, Wind Rider's Oath, At All Costs, Hell Hath No Fury, Torch of Freedom, and Mission of Honor each contain a CD, holding electronic copies of all the David Weber books published by Baen up to that moment. The CD labels explicitly state that the contents are freely distributable. The CDs have been mirrored on various sites.

Many of Weber's books are available online, either in their entirety as part of the Baen Free Library or, in the case of more recent books, in the form of sample chapters (typically the first 25–33% of the work).

=== Honorverse ===
Works within the Honorverse fictional universe, derived from the Honor Harrington series

==== Honor Harrington series ====
This series follows Honor Harrington, a young officer in the Royal Manticoran Navy as she works her way up through the ranks. Throughout the series she encounters the many set-backs and road blocks that any underdog may face but with her extraordinary wits and determination she never lets anything get in her way of serving her Queen and Star Nation to the fullest.

1. On Basilisk Station (April 1993) ISBN 0-671-57793-X
2. The Honor of the Queen (June 1993) ISBN 0-671-57864-2
3. The Short Victorious War (April 1994) ISBN 0-671-87596-5
4. Field of Dishonor (October 1994) ISBN 0-671-57820-0
5. Flag in Exile (September 1995) ISBN 0-671-31980-9
6. Honor Among Enemies (February 1996) ISBN 0-671-87723-2
7. In Enemy Hands (July 1997) ISBN 0-671-57770-0
8. Echoes of Honor (October 1998) ISBN 0-671-57833-2
9. Ashes of Victory (March 2000) ISBN 0-671-57854-5
10. War of Honor (October 2002) ISBN 0-7434-3545-1
11. At All Costs (November 2005) ISBN 1-4165-0911-9
12. Mission of Honor (June 2010) ISBN 1-4391-3361-1
13. A Rising Thunder (March 6, 2012) ISBN 978-1-4516-3806-6
14. Uncompromising Honor (October 2, 2018) ISBN 978-1-4814-8350-6
15. Toll of Honor (April 2, 2024) ISBN 978-1-9821-9331-7

==== Works related to the Honor Harrington series ====
Worlds of Honor anthologies
Novellas and short stories related to the Honor Harrington series. Edited by Weber.

1. More Than Honor (January 1998) ISBN 0-671-87857-3
2. Worlds of Honor (February 1999) ISBN 0-671-57855-3
3. Changer of Worlds (March 2001) ISBN 0-671-31975-2
4. The Service of the Sword (April 2003) ISBN 0-7434-3599-0
5. In Fire Forged (February 2011) ISBN 1-4391-3414-6
6. Beginnings (July 2, 2013) ISBN 1-4516-3903-1
7. What Price Victory? (February 7, 2023) ISBN 1-9821-9241-0
8. Challenges (November 4, 2025)

Crown of Slaves sub-series

1. Crown of Slaves with Eric Flint (September 2003) ISBN 0-7434-7148-2
2. Torch of Freedom with Eric Flint (November 2009) ISBN 1-4391-3305-0
3. Cauldron of Ghosts with Eric Flint (April 8, 2014) ISBN 1-4767-3633-2
4. To End in Fire with Eric Flint (October 5, 2021) ISBN 1-9821-2564-0

Saganami sub-series

1. The Shadow of Saganami (October 2004) ISBN 0-7434-8852-0
2. Storm from the Shadows (March 2009) ISBN 1-4165-9147-8
3. Shadow of Freedom (March 5, 2013) ISBN 1-4516-3869-8
4. Shadow of Victory (November 1, 2016) ISBN 978-1-4767-8182-2

Young adult series

Focuses on Stephanie Harrington and the discovery of treecats.

1. A Beautiful Friendship (October 2011) ISBN 978-1-4516-3747-2
2. Fire Season with Jane Lindskold (October 2012) ISBN 978-1-4516-3840-0
3. Treecat Wars with Jane Lindskold (October 1, 2013) ISBN 978-1-4516-3933-9
4. A New Clan with Jane Lindskold (June 2022) ISBN 978-1-9821-9189-4
5. Friends Indeed with Jane Lindskold (March 2025) ISBN 978-1-6680-7245-5

Companion

- House of Steel: The Honorverse Companion (May 2013) ISBN 9781451638752—Includes the new novella I Will Build a House of Steel by David Weber.

The Manticore Ascendant series

It includes a short story published in Beginnings, "A Call to Arms", and is intended to include at least three novels.

1. A Call to Duty with Timothy Zahn (October 7, 2014) ISBN 1-4767-3684-7
2. A Call to Arms with Timothy Zahn and Thomas Pope (October 6, 2015) ISBN 1-4767-8085-4
3. A Call to Vengeance with Timothy Zahn and Thomas Pope (March 6, 2018), ISBN 978-1-4767-8210-2
4. A Call to Insurrection with Timothy Zahn and Thomas Pope (February 1, 2022), ISBN 1982125896
5. A Call to Deception with Timothy Zahn and Thomas Pope (expected July 7, 2026), ISBN 1668073315

Short stories (not included in other Honorverse collections)

- "Our Sacred Honor". Published in Infinite Stars (October 2017), ISBN 9781785654596: anthology edited Bryan Thomas Schmidt
- "Recruiting Exercise". Published in Noir Fatale (May 2019), ISBN 9781481483971: anthology edited by Larry Correia and Kacey Ezell
- "Heart of Stone". Published in Give Me Libertycon (June 2020), ISBN 9781982124649: anthology edited by Christopher Woods and T. K. F. Weisskopf
- "A Travesty of Nature". Published in Onward Libertycon June 2022, ISBN 9781946419460: anthology edited by Christopher Woods and T. K. F. Weisskopf

=== Dahak series ===
- Mutineers' Moon (October 1991) ISBN 0-671-72085-6
- The Armageddon Inheritance (October 1994) ISBN 0-671-72197-6
- Heirs of Empire (February 1996) ISBN 0-671-87707-0
- An omnibus re-issue of all three books, titled Empire from the Ashes, was released in hardcover in March 2003 (ISBN 0-7434-3593-1) and in trade paperback in February 2006 (ISBN 1-4165-0933-X)

=== War God series ===
1. Oath of Swords (February 1995), ISBN 0-671-87642-2
2. The War God's Own (May 1998), ISBN 0-671-87873-5
3. Wind Rider's Oath (May 2004), ISBN 0-7434-8821-0
4. War Maid's Choice (July 2012), ISBN 978-1-4516-3835-6 (HB)
5. The Sword of the South (August 4, 2015), ISBN 978-1476780849

- "Sword Brother", a novella published in the January 2007 edition of Oath of Swords, ISBN 1-4165-2086-4

=== Safehold series ===
The Safehold series

1. Off Armageddon Reef (January 2007) ISBN 978-0-7653-1500-7
2. By Schism Rent Asunder (July 2008) ISBN 978-0-7653-1501-4
3. By Heresies Distressed (June 2009) ISBN 978-0-7653-1503-8
4. A Mighty Fortress (April 2010) ISBN 978-0-7653-1505-2
5. How Firm a Foundation (September 2011) ISBN 978-0-7653-2154-1
6. Midst Toil and Tribulation (September 2012) ISBN 978-0-7653-2155-8
7. Like a Mighty Army (February 18, 2014) ISBN 978-0-7653-2156-5
8. Hell's Foundations Quiver (October 13, 2015) ISBN 978-0-7653-2187-9
9. At the Sign of Triumph (November 8, 2016) ISBN 978-0-7653-2558-7
10. Through Fiery Trials (January 8, 2019) ISBN 978-0-7653-2559-4

=== Furies series ===
- Path of the Fury (December 1992) ISBN 0-671-72147-X. This is a story of Alicia DeVries, a retired female marine commando, the fading Fury Tisiphone, and an AI running an advanced warship centuries in the future, who team up to hunt down space pirates.
- In Fury Born (April 2006) ISBN 1-4165-2054-6 is an expanded re-issue of Path of the Fury that includes a full length prequel novel about the protagonist.

With Richard Fox
Ascent to Empire series

This series is a prequel to the In Fury Born set a few hundred years before that book. This series is set during the League Wars and tells of the beginning of the rise of the house of Murphy.

1. Governor (June 2021), ISBN 978-1-9821-2540-0
2. Rebel (September 2024), ISBN 978-1-9821-9360-7

=== Shongairi series ===
1. Out of the Dark (September 2010; ISBN 978-0-7653-2412-2) is an extended version of the 78-page story of the same name in the anthology Warriors (2010), edited by George R. R. Martin and Gardner Dozois. ISBN 978-0-7653-2048-3
2. Into the Light (January 2021; ISBN 9780765331458), coauthored with Chris Kennedy, is a sequel to Out of the Dark.
3. To Challenge Heaven (January 2024; ISBN 9781250907394), coauthored with Chris Kennedy, is a sequel to Into the Light.

=== Other novels ===
- The Apocalypse Troll (January 1999; ISBN 0-671-57845-6). This is the story of a retired naval officer who witnesses an intense air battle from his yacht and rescues the downed pilot who turns out to be from the future. She was shot down by an interstellar enemy that she chased through time and space on their way to "Terra" to eliminate humans before they can win the war they are fighting in the future.
- The Excalibur Alternative (January 2002; ISBN 0-671-31860-8), expands "Sir George and the Dragon", a short story which appeared in the anthology Foreign Legions edited by David Drake (2001; ISBN 0-671-31990-6)

=== Short stories ===
- "The Captain from Kirkbean", collected by Harry Turtledove's in the anthology Alternate Generals (1998)
- "Out of the Dark" collected by Gardner Dozois and George R. R. Martin in the anthology Warriors (2010)
- "Washington's Rebellion" collected by Joan Spicci Saberhagen and Robert E. Vardeman in the anthology Golden Reflections (2011)
- "Dark Fall" Published on the Baen Website (2018)
- "Marching Through", collected by Chris Kennedy and James Young in the anthology Trouble in the Wind (2019)
- "Home Is Where the Heart Is", collected by Edward Willett in the anthology Shapers of Worlds (2020)
- "Fire from Heaven" Collected by Robert E. Hampson and Sandra L. Medlockand in the anthology The Founder Effect (2020)
- "Kamekura", Collected in Robert E. Hampson and Sandra L. Medlockand in the anthology The Founder Effect (2020)

=== Collections ===
- Worlds of Weber: Ms. Midshipwoman Harrington and Other Stories (September 2008) ISBN 978-1-59606-177-4

=== Shared universes ===
Bolo series

Works set in the Bolo fictional universe created by Keith Laumer

- Bolo! (January 2005) ISBN 0-7434-9872-0. Stories of Bolo tanks with artificial intelligence.
- Old Soldiers (January 2007) ISBN 1-4165-0898-8, a Bolo tank story

=== Collaborations ===
With Steve White
Starfire series (based on the Starfire games)

- Insurrection (November 1990) ISBN 0-671-72024-4 (chronologically this novel takes place after The Shiva Option)
- Crusade (March 1992) ISBN 0-671-72111-9
- In Death Ground (May 1997) ISBN 0-671-87779-8
- The Shiva Option (February 2002) ISBN 0-671-31848-9
- Omnibus collections:
  - The Stars at War (August 2004) ISBN 0-7434-8841-5 is an omnibus hardcover re-issue of Crusade and In Death Ground
  - The Stars at War II (July 2005) ISBN 0-7434-9912-3 is an omnibus hardcover re-issue of The Shiva Option and Insurrection with 20,000 words of connecting material and restored edits.

With John Ringo
Empire of Man series

- March Upcountry (May 2001) ISBN 0-671-31985-X
- March to the Sea (2001) ISBN 0-671-31826-8
- March to the Stars (January 2003) ISBN 0-7434-3562-1
- We Few (April 2005) ISBN 0-7434-9881-X
- Omnibus collections:
  - Empire of Man (February 2014) ISBN 1476736243; collects March Upcountry and March to the Sea
  - Throne of Stars (August 2014) (ISBN 978-1-4767-3666-2); collects March to the Stars and We Few

With Eric Flint
1632 series

- 1633 (July 2002) ISBN 0-7434-3542-7
- 1634: The Baltic War (May 2007) ISBN 1-4165-2102-X
- "In the Navy", a short story in the anthology Ring of Fire edited by Eric Flint (2004) ISBN 0-7434-7175-X, set in the world of the 1632 series

With Jacob Holo
Gordian Division series

- The Gordian Protocol (May 2019, ISBN 978-1-4814-8396-4)
- The Valkyrie Protocol (October 2020, ISBN 978-1-9821-2490-8)
- The Janus File (October 2022, ISBN 978-1-9821-9215-0)
- The Weltall File (June 2023, ISBN 978-1-9821-9265-5)
- The Thermopylae Protocol (June 2024, ISBN 978-1-9821-9343-0)

(Solo works by Jacob Holo in this series are omitted.)

Multiverse series
With Linda Evans:
- Hell's Gate (October 2006) ISBN 1-4165-0939-9
- Hell Hath No Fury (March 2007) ISBN 1-4165-2101-1
With Joelle Presby:
- The Road to Hell (March 1, 2016)
- untitled fourth volume (planned)

Multi-author collections

- The Warmasters (2002) ISBN 0-7434-3534-6, includes David Weber's Ms. Midshipwoman Harrington together with Island by Eric Flint and Choosing Sides by David Drake.
