= Saganami =

Saganami may refer to:

- Edward Saganami, a character in David Weber's Honorverse.
- The Shadow of Saganami, a spin-off novel set in the Honorverse.
- Saganami Island Tactical Simulator, a Honorverse-based tabletop wargame.
