= More Than Honor =

- First edition
- Author: David Weber, David Drake, S.M. Stirling
- Cover artist: David Mattingly
- Language: English
- Series: Honorverse
- Genre: Military science fiction
- Publication date: 1/1/1998
- Publication place: United States
- Media type: Print (Paperback)
- ISBN: 0-671-87857-3
- OCLC: 38114085
- Preceded by: N/A (first anthology)
- Followed by: Worlds of Honor

More Than Honor, published in 1998, was the first anthology of stories set in the Honorverse. The stories in the anthologies serve to introduce characters, provide deeper more complete backstory and flesh out the universe, so claim the same canonical relevance as exposition in the main series. David Weber, author of the mainline Honor Harrington series, serves as editor for the anthologies, maintaining fidelity to the series canons.

The book contains the following stories:

- "A Beautiful Friendship" by David Weber (HHA1 and Worlds of Weber). The story of the first meeting between humans (Stephanie Harrington) and treecats (Climbs Quickly). This story was later expanded to a full length young adult novel, published in 2011.
- "A Grand Tour" by David Drake: A story with few links to any other in the Honorverse setting. Careful reading may reveal similarities to the first novel in his RCN Series, in the characters, style, and attitude. Both were published in 1998. Indeed, Drake confirms that A Grand Tour is the conceptual antecedent of With the Lightnings.
- "A Whiff of Grapeshot" by S. M. Stirling. This story serves as background to the "Leveler Uprising" mentioned in the early chapters of In Enemy Hands. A radical Havenite faction stages an uprising against the rule of the Committee of Public Safety, wreaking havoc in the Havenite capital city of Nouveau Paris. With the Committee's security forces in complete disarray following an attack on its information network, the only forces able to intervene and restore order are Navy ships under the command of Admiral Esther McQueen, even though the Admiral is not precisely a supporter of the Committee and has an agenda of her own.
- "The Universe of Honor Harrington" by David Weber. A "deep background" essay covering such diverse topics as the physics of space travel, the mechanics space colonization and politics of various "star nations", such as Manticore, Haven and the Solarian League.

== Reception ==
The anthology was reviewed:

- by Carolyn Cushman in Locus, #446 March 1998
- by Burkholder Vicky in Voice of Youth Advocates, August 1998 edition
