= WS1 =

WS1 can refer to:

- Waardenburg syndrome, a genetic disorder
- Crown of Slaves, the 1st book in David Weber's Wages of Sin series
- WS-1, (Weishi Rockets-1) a 302mm self-propelled multiple rocket launcher
- FA WSL 1, the top tier of the FA Women's Super League in English football
- WS1, a candidate phylum of bacteria
- Ampere WS-1, a short-lived laptop manufactured in Japan
