= Worlds of Honor =

- First edition cover art
- Author: David Weber, Linda Evans, Jane Lindskold, Roland J. Green.
- Cover artist: David Mattingly
- Language: English
- Series: Honorverse
- Genre: Military science fiction
- Publication date: March 2000
- Publication place: United States
- Media type: Book, anthology
- Pages: 343
- ISBN: 0-671-57855-3
- OCLC: 43645114
- Preceded by: More Than Honor
- Followed by: Changer of Worlds

Worlds of Honor, published in 1999, was the second anthology of stories set in the Honor Harrington universe or Honorverse. The stories in the anthologies serve to introduce characters, provide deeper more complete backstory and flesh out the universe, so claim the same canonical relevance as exposition in the main series. David Weber, author of the mainline Honor Harrington series, serves as editor for the anthologies, maintaining fidelity to the series canons.

The book contains the following stories:

The Stray by Linda Evans
Set shortly after A Beautiful Friendship, this is an early story of human interaction with treecats.
What Price Dreams? by David Weber
Another story about human-treecat interaction, exploring the background to the treecats' extraordinary status in Manticoran society.
Queen's Gambit by Jane Lindskold
Roger III, King of Manticore, dies in what appears to be an accident. His daughter Elizabeth rises to the throne, and suspects that the death of her father may not have been an accident at all. Meanwhile, a cabal of Manticoran politicians make their moves in an attempt to influence Elizabeth's regency. As all sides make their moves, the new Queen Elizabeth learns a hard lesson about politics and compromise in the process.
The Hard Way Home by David Weber
Lieutenant Commander Honor Harrington, executive officer of the cruiser HMS Broadsword, is participating in a series of evaluation exercises of a new type of pinnace when an avalanche strikes a holiday resort on the planet Gryphon, killing hundreds and burying many others under meters of snow. Honor must take command of the rescue operations and save as many people as she and the men and women of Broadsword can.
Deck Load Strike by Roland J. Green
The planet Silvestria, located close to the Erewhon Wormhole Junction, is home to two low-tech warring nations. The strategic relevance of Silvestria is not lost to the Manticorans and their Havenite enemies. A war by proxy between both Silvestrian nations break out, with the Canmore Republic receiving support from Manticore and Erewhon, and the Kingdom of Chuiban being assisted by Havenite forces.

== Reviews ==
- Review by Carolyn Cushman (1999) in Locus, #456 January 1999
- Review by Mark W. Tiedemann (1999) in Science Fiction Age, March 1999, (1999)
- Review by Fred Patten (2000) in Yarf! The Journal of Applied Anthropomorphics #58
- Review by Jerzy Stachowicz (2006) in Nowa Fantastyka, 8/2006, p. 70
