= In Fire Forged =

2011 anthology by Timothy Zahn

- First edition
- Author: David Weber, Jane Lindskold, Timothy Zahn.
- Cover artist: David Mattingly
- Language: English
- Series: Honorverse
- Genre: Military science fiction
- Publication date: February 1, 2011
- Publication place: United States
- Media type: Print (Hardcover, 400 pages)
- ISBN: 1-4391-3414-6
- Dewey Decimal: 813/...
- LC Class: PS648.xx xxxx 2011
- Preceded by: The Service of the Sword
- Followed by: House of Steel

In Fire Forged, published February 1, 2011, is the fifth anthology of stories set in the Honor Harrington universe or Honorverse. The stories in the anthologies serve to introduce characters, provide deeper more complete backstory and flesh out the universe, so claim the same canonical relevance as exposition in the main series. David Weber, author of the mainline Honor Harrington series, serves as editor for the anthologies, maintaining fidelity to the series canons

The book contains the following stories:

"Ruthless" by Jane Lindskold, a sequel to her previous short story ("Promised Land" from The Service of the Sword), involving the Royal scion Michael Winton and Judith of Masada.

"An Act of War" by Timothy Zahn, is a sequel to his previous short story ("With One Stone" from The Service of the Sword). It features "Charles", a slippery, conniving, elusive, less than totally honest dealer in black-market technology.

"Let's Dance" by David Weber, is the longest story. It covers the Casimir raid prior to On Basilisk Station, and how then-Commander Honor Harrington broke up a slave depot on Casimir (an event mentioned in At All Costs).

"An Introduction to Modern Starship Armor Design", by Mr. Hegel DiLutorio, CAPT, RMN, ret. HMSS Hephaestus, 1906 PD is an in depth design study regarding the history and design of laser heads and armor.
