= The Shadow of Saganami =

2004 novel by David Weber

- First edition
- Author: David Weber
- Illustrator: Randy Asplundh
- Cover artist: David Mattingly
- Language: English
- Series: Honor Harrington series
- Genre: Science fiction
- Publisher: Baen Books
- Publication date: November 1, 2004
- Publication place: United States
- Media type: Print (hardback & paperback)
- Pages: 736
- ISBN: 0743488520; 9780743488525
- OCLC: 55800908
- Dewey Decimal: 813/.54 22
- LC Class: PS3573.E217 S54 2004
- Followed by: Storm from the Shadows

The Shadow of Saganami is a science fiction novel by American writer David Weber, published in 2004. Set in the Honorverse, it is the first in the Saganami Island series, spun off from the main Honor Harrington series. It debuted at No. 16 on The New York Times best seller list for hardcover fiction.

Honor appears in a cameo role. Other characters from the novels and several short stories take centre stage. These include Helen Zilwicki, introduced in "From the Highlands" (after a cameo in The Short Victorious War), and Abigail Hearns, introduced in Ashes of Victory and also seen in The Service of the Sword.

== Plot summary ==
The events of the novel are simultaneous with those of the novel At All Costs, which belongs to the main novel series of the Honorverse.

The story focuses on the shakedown cruise of the Edward Saganami-C-class heavy cruiser HMS Hexapuma (nicknamed Nasty Kitty), commanded by Captain Aivars Terekhov, a war veteran and former prisoner of war who has only recently been cleared for return to active naval service. The Hexapuma is assigned to the Talbott Cluster, a group of star systems that is holding votes on whether to be annexed into the Star Kingdom of Manticore. With the renewal of the war with Haven as well as annexation of parts of the Silesian Confederacy, Manticore assigns the Hexapuma to lead a small naval force to guard the Cluster during its discussions of the terms of the Cluster's formal annexation.

However, the Solarian League's Office of Frontier Security (OFS), greedy interstellar corporations, and genetic slaving corporations of Mesa do not want the Talbott Cluster annexed by Manticore. To try to hinder the discussions, they send an agent to offer support to groups violently opposed to annexation with the goal of causing civil unrest and give OFS an excuse to intervene under the pretence of "preserving regional peace". The oligarchs of the various Talbott Cluster star systems are also tenuous in their support of the annexation as they worry that their power will be diminished under Manticore. Additionally, because the annexation is supported by a local merchant cartel with a history of strong-arm tactis and economic abuse, much of the population is wary of supporting the annexation for fear those tactics and abuses will continue.

Hexapuma and her crew embark on a goodwill patrol of the Cluster's systems, meant to "show the flag" and deal with issues of piracy and smuggling. One of the major systems is Montana, where Stephen Westman bombs multiple government facilities without causing a single casualty. On nearby Kornati, Agnes Nordbrant carries out multiple bombings that slaughter hundreds of civilians. Both groups are supplied and supported secretly by the OFS agent known as 'Firebrand'. After the Hexapuma accidentally discovers a Mesan freighter delivering weapons to Westman, the freighter destroys the inspection pinnace sent by Terekhov, and the freighter is severely damaged by Hexapuma in reposnse. The remaining Mesan crew quickly surrenders and eventually provides information on an OFS task force being secretly sent to settle the unrest in the Cluster.

Terekhov assembles a small squadron of ships and leads them to the Monica system (which is near the Talbott Cluster), where he demands the surrender of the local fleet as well as the OFS ships masquerading as part of Monica's fleet. After Monica refuses, the battle results in the destruction of almost all of the Monican ships and about half of Terekhov's squadron. After threatening to destroy all of the remaining military infrastructure in Monica, Terekhov is able to hold the system long enough for reinforcements to arrive from the Talbott Cluster.

After repairing his ships enough for them to get underway, Terekhov and the Hexapuma return to Manticore where Queen Elizabeth III and the Home Fleet welcome them and applaud their service in the Cluster.

== Reception ==
The Shadow of Saganami debuted at No. 16 on The New York Times best seller list for hardcover fiction.

Reviews for the book were mostly positive. Publishers Weekly praised the narrative for demonstrating that "a hero can be anyone who does his or her job with honor, commitment and skill". John Joyce, reviewing for Scientific Computing & Instrumentation, stated "this book is very satisfying on several levels". The book was included in 2005 in the first volume of What Do I Read Next? A Reader's Guide to Current Genre Fiction from Gale.

The Midwest Book Review called it "[possibly] Weber's best tale in the Honorverse", stating that Weber "provides an action packed tale with a fully developed...cast". Alex Hormann, in reviewing the book for At Boundary's Edge, was disappointed with it. He said "[it didn't] add anything of its own" and "though as well-written as ever, really just retread[s] familiar ground".

== Sequels ==
The Shadow of Saganami is followed by several sequels:

Storm from the Shadows
(March 2009, Baen, 755 pages, ISBN 978-1-4165-9147-4)

After Manticore's Eighth Fleet is destroyed in a Havenite attack that used a new missile control system, Admiral Michelle Henke is thought killed in action. In reality, she was severely injured and captured by the Havenite forces. Due to orders from Admiral Thomas Theisman, the head of Havenite military forces, Henke is treated well as a prisoner and even visited by the president of the Republic of Haven, Eloise Pritchart. The Republic of Haven seems to have changed how things were under the People's Republic of Haven, and Henke develops a grudging respect for Theisman's and Pritchart's efforts to treat all their prisoners well. After six months as a prisoner, Henke is paroled and sent back to the Star Kingdom of Manticore under the provision that she cannot participate in the war against Haven. After arriving in Manticore, she is assigned to become second in command (under Vice Admiral Khumalo) of the Manticoran forces in the Talbott Cluster.

Manpower, the most powerful interstellar corporation in the Mesa system, assigns Aldonna Anisimovna to work with the government in the New Tuscan system, only Talbott system to decline annexation by Manticore. Through Anisimovna's machinations, the government of New Tuscany creates a false conflict between itself and Manticore through a series of provoking incidents, and a Solarian Fleet task force is dispatched to the Talbott Cluster under the leadership of the hot-headed and arrogant Admiral Josef Byng. Byng is unaware of Anisimovna's plans, which included him being assigned to this task force, and believes he is being sent to show the "neobarbs" from Manticore that they better not provoke the Solarian League or they'll face the might of the Solarian League Navy.

After several incidents where Byng deliberately provokes Henke, events come to a head in New Tuscany when the New Tucans make it appear a Manticoran vessel has attacked and destroyed one of their ships. Three Manticoran destroyers are sent to investigate the incident. After Anisimovna detonates a nuke on the New Tuscany space station as the destroyers are approaching, Byng destroys the Manticoran ships in a surprise attack under the pretense that the Manticorans had just attacked the space station. Admiral Henke gathers what ships she can and arrives in the New Tuscany system, demanding Byng's immediate surrender. He refuses several times, after which Henke destroys his ship from far beyond the range of any of Byng's weapons, and Byng's second in command surrenders immediately.

Back on Manticore, Honor Harrington convinces Queen Elizabeth III that the war between Haven and Manticore was engineered by Mesa to keep the two star nations occupied with each other instead of poking their noses around in Mesa's affairs. The OFS leadership tasks Solarian League Navy Fleet Admiral Sandra Crandall with handling the Manticoran ships in the Talbott Cluster. The book ends with a secret Mesan task force placing hundreds of stealth missile pods in the Manticoran system.

Shadow of Freedom
(March 2013, Baen, 439 pages, ISBN 978-1-4516-3782-3)

Dozens of independence-minded star systems in the Verge of the Solarian League have been receiving offers of support as well as weapons and supplies from a man representing himself as a benevolent Manticoran agent working in secret to help troubled star systems that want to break away from the Solarian League and its Office of Frontier Security. However, he's actually working to set up Manticore as a fall guy by making promises that don't end up being kept since Manticore is unaware of the promises being made.

After two Manticoran merchant ships and their crews are illegally detained in the Saltash system, Admiral Henke sends a small destroyer squadron to rescue them. The Saltash system government refused to cooperate, and the Manticoran forces destroyed or crippled the numerically-superior Frontier Fleet squadron while sustaining no Manticoran casualties. Manticoran forces led by Abigail Hearns then boarded Shona Station—in orbit around the planet Cinnamon—and freed the Manticoran merchants.

In the Mobius system, the system government carried out the slaughter of 2000 civilians, and Mobius Liberation Front retaliated violently. The despotic president of the Mobius system then requested assistance from OFS intervene, and the leader of the MLF sent a request to Manticoran forces in the Talbott Cluster to honor the offer of support the MLF thought had been offered. The anti-government violence on Mobius continues to escalate and the MLF sends a second request for assistance from Manticore. While Admiral Henke knows Manticore hasn't offered the assistance, she also knows that not responding would ruin the name and honor of Manticore in the Talbott Cluster and the Verge, so she sends Captain Terekhov to offer assistance.

He arrives to find OFS has already arrived and is—along with Mobius government forces—indiscriminately killing civilians and members of the MLF through mass executions and kinetic strikes on MLF targets and civilian population centers. Terekhov demands that OFS and the Mobius forces cease operations, and the Solarian forces in orbit abandon their ships and scuttle them. The OFS commander on the ground refuses, and threatens to kill even more civilians, so Terekhov orders a kinetic strike on her headquarters. The remaining OFS and Mobius system forces then completely surrender, and the Mobius civilians are rescued.

With rebellions against OFS and Frontier Fleet happening all over the Verge, and over 500 ships from the Solarian League Navy Eleventh Fleet either destroyed or captured at the Second Battle of Manticore, Admiral Henke moves quickly to take over the Meyers system and the Madras Sector before OFS and the SLN can regroup. In doing so, she captures Frontier Fleet Commodore Thurgood, and OFS Commissioner Verrochio and Vice Commissioner Hongbo, from who she is able to confirm many of the suspicions Manticore had about Mesan involvement in the Talbott Cluster and the Verge. The book ends with Henke assembling a fleet for the invasion of the Mesa system.

Shadow of Freedom was nominated for the 2014 Prometheus Award.

Shadow of Victory
(November 2016, Baen, 756 pages, ISBN 978-1-4767-8182-2)

This book tells much the same story as in Shadow of Freedom, but from different viewpoints. Specifically, it offers significant coverage of Mesan Alignment characters, giving many additional details about their planned evacuation of Mesa of members of the innermost layers of the Alignment "onion". It covers many details of the Yawata Strike from the point of view of the covert Mesan forces who implemented it. It also covers the main invasion of the Mesa system.
