= Changer of Worlds =

2001 anthology

Worlds of Honor
- First edition
- Author: David Weber, Eric Flint
- Cover artist: Carol Heyer
- Language: English
- Series: Honorverse
- Genre: Military science fiction
- Publisher: Baen Books
- Publication date: March 2001
- Publication place: United States
- Media type: Print (paperback)
- ISBN: 978-0-671-31975-5
- OCLC: 45284649
- Dewey Decimal: 813/.54 21
- LC Class: PS3573.E217 C48 2001
- Preceded by: Worlds of Honor
- Followed by: Service of the Sword

Changer of Worlds, published in 2001, was the third anthology of stories set in the Honor Harrington universe or Honorverse. The stories in the anthologies serve to introduce characters, provide deeper more complete backstory and flesh out the universe, so claim the same canonical relevance as exposition in the main series. David Weber, author of the mainline Honor Harrington series, serves as editor for the anthologies, maintaining fidelity to the series canons.

== Contents ==
The book (designated HHA3) contains the following stories (by David Weber unless otherwise marked):

=== Ms. Midshipwoman Harrington ===
(HH0), also reprinted in the Worlds of Weber collection depicting universes invented by David Weber

Midshipwoman Honor Harrington embarks on the heavy cruiser HMS War Maiden for her midshipman's cruise, the final pass-fail make-or-break shipboard training and testing that will see her accepted as an officer (ensign) or washed out as a civilian. The War Maiden, an aging heavy cruiser is on an anti-piracy and commerce protection mission which will take the ship to the chaos-ridden Silesian Confederacy. During her cruise, Honor experiences life on a Manticoran warship, learns from excellent officers and suffers under one pre-prejudiced and incompetent one, who unfortunately is the OCTO, the Officer Candidate ("snotty" or midshipman) Training Officer who is politically connected and been manipulated into giving Honor and her treecat Nimitz a particularly tough time, at the behest of Lord North Hollow. That corrupt peer is the father of Pavel Young, who had been sanctioned for attempting to rape Honor at the naval academy.

Her budding professionalism and poise wins her friends and engenders appreciation in the crew and stands in stark contrast to the behavior of her OCTO, Lt. Elvis Santino, and the ship's command team eventually removes him from his supervisory role. Honor blossoms in the environment standing out among the four midshipmen on their snotty cruise, but later learns a tough real-life lesson on command when the War Maiden battles a separatist Silesian ship, and takes heavy damage. Several of her fellow midshipmen as well as much of the crew are casualties. It survives only because Honor, the assistant tactical officer, is able to act when the Captain is disabled and other ranking officers in Auxiliary Control are cut off and trapped by battle damages. The title is a clear nod to C.S. Forester's "Mr. Midshipman Hornblower" short story.

=== Changer of Worlds ===
(HHA3)
When Honor Harrington returns to the family seat on 'pregnancy leave' with the mated treecats Nimitz and Samantha, after her kittens are born the two parents return to his clan after years in space. Honor in fact, spends her time with the Weapons Development Board and reports out the design concepts for the new classes of warships her experience with LAC carrier Q-ships and missile pods have given her during her recent tour in Silesia (Honor Among Enemies HH06). After hearing first-hand testimony of the perils and dangers of the ongoing Haven-Manticore war, and the possible annihilation the war entails for their race, the treecats are revealed to have a world spanning society and organization. An organization of elders that has concealed the true abilities of treecats for centuries from mankind, and one that now makes the momentous decision to extend their range off-world and "colonize" other worlds. This is the background explanation of why other adult treecats migrated off planet leading to their arrival on Grayson during the beginning of In Enemy Hands.

=== From the Highlands ===
by Eric Flint
In the eve of a former Havenite admiral, Amos Parnell's arrival to Old Earth to testify against the excesses and crimes of the Havenite regime, Helen Zilwicki, daughter of Captain Anton Zilwicki of the Royal Manticoran Navy, finds herself in the midst of an underground fight between StateSec agents, anti-slavery terrorists, mercenaries and an unscrupulous supercorporation centered on the rogue planet of Mesa, "Manpower Incorporated". This story reprises the Zilwicki family survivors who were first introduced in The Short Victorious War in the action where Mrs. Zilwicki was killed. This story along with Fanatic (in HHA4) serve together as background for the Wages of Sin spin-off novel sub-series books Crown of Slaves and Torch of Freedom, geographically covering events in the Solarian League Meyers Sector or the Torch-Erewhon region among the verge systems.

=== Nightfall ===
(HHA3)
The story of Oscar Saint-Just's accession to power as sole dictatorial ruler of the terror driven People's Republic of Haven. This story was most likely originally part of Ashes of Victory (in which it is a turning point in the plot), but cut down to a summary to save space. In the tale, the ambitious Havenite Secretary of War, Admiral Esther McQueen, who had long been at odds with Oscar Saint-Just and who had been carefully planning a coup against the ruling Committee of Public Safety which rubber stamps decisions made by Saint-Just and Chairman Rob Pierre, is forced to make her move before time, and her troops fight against the State Security forces commanded by Saint-Just throughout the streets of Nouveau Paris. The overthrow of the Committee seems imminent and civil war is about to break in the planet Haven, until Saint-Just makes a frightening move of his own.

== Reviews ==
- Review by Carolyn Cushman (2001) in Locus, #482 March 2001
- Review in Publishers Weekly
- Review in Library Journal (2001)
- Review in Kirkus Reviews (2001)
