= Mission of Honor =

2010 novel by David Weber

- First edition
- Author: David Weber
- Cover artist: David Mattingly
- Language: English
- Series: Honor Harrington series
- Genre: Military science fiction
- Publication date: June 22, 2010
- Publication place: United States
- Media type: Print (Hardback & Paperback)
- Pages: 600
- ISBN: 978-1-4391-3361-3
- Preceded by: At All Costs
- Followed by: A Rising Thunder

Mission of Honor is a science fiction novel by American writer David Weber, published on June 22, 2010 by Baen Books. It is the twelfth novel set in the Honorverse in the main Honor Harrington series.

== Plot summary ==
The book begins in January 1922 P.D. The Star Empire of Manticore remains at war with the Republic of Haven, despite their mutual losses during the Battle of Manticore. Now, the Star Empire is in danger of entering an entirely new conflict with the Solarian League, a galactic superstate with a population numbering several trillion. Though Manticore possesses a decisive tactical and technological edge over the Solarians with their anti-ship missiles and missile defense systems, the Solarians boast a fleet of over ten thousand capital ships. The planet Mesa and its shadow government continue to foment an increasingly hostile Manticoran-Solarian relationship for its own nefarious ends. At the same time, Mesa has launched a potentially devastating strike against the Manticore Home System itself, which has gone completely undetected by Manticore.

Meanwhile, Admiral Duchess Honor Alexander-Harrington of Manticore is dispatched on a diplomatic mission to the Republic of Haven, having convinced Queen Elizabeth III of Manticore that the Haven issue cannot be left unresolved in the wake of an increasingly likely confrontation with the Solarian League. Traveling to the Haven System itself in her civilian yacht, but escorted by her own 8th Fleet, she offers the Republic a chance to conclude their war diplomatically rather than face sure annihilation due to Manticore's unmatchable tactical advantage. Despite getting off to a good start, the negotiations become stalled when Havenite politicians obstruct the talks for personal political gain. Alexander-Harrington initially tolerates this effort in the interest of good diplomacy, but eventually publicly calls out the leader of the opposition politicians, forcing him to back down. However, the talks are suspended when word reaches Haven that a sneak attack, by seemingly unknown forces, has wrought havoc on the Manticore Home System's infrastructure.

While Alexander-Harrington is trying for a negotiated peace settlement with Haven, the Royal Manticoran Navy's 10th fleet led by Vice Admiral Michelle Henke is attacked by a Solarian task force at the Spindle System in the newly incorporated Talbott Quadrant. Admiral Sandra Crandall, commander of the Solarian Force, acting on her own desire for vengeance and Mesan manipulations and bribes demands the surrender of 10th Fleet and arrest of Henke. Baroness Medusa, Governor-General of the Talbott Quadrant, refuses to honor Crandall's demands. The Solarian forces begin their attack run but are ambushed by 10th Fleet in a lopsided victory, despite the fact that Henke has only a few dozen cruiser-sized ships to defend against 73 ships of the wall and their screening elements. After the destruction of the Solarian flagship and a third of the task force, Crandall's third in command assumes control and surrenders the survivors.

Shortly afterward, Mesa's secret Operation Oyster Bay is launched. Covert operations ships using a radically new drive technology have been operating in the Manticore System undetected and placed several stealth missile pods aimed at the three inhabited planets in the Manticore System. In a coordinated attack, the pods fire several volleys of new missile systems which proceed to destroy all of the important orbital infrastructures around Manticore, Sphinx, and Gryphon. Several million Manticoran civilians and naval personnel are killed. The Star Empire completely loses the space stations Hephaestus, Vulcan, and Weyland, and with their loss, the ability to construct new shipping and missiles. Grayson, Manticore's loyal ally, is similarly attacked. This is all happening at the same time that Manticore is facing a full-scale conflict with the Solarian League. Alexander-Harrington is recalled from the peace negotiations with Haven in the wake of the assault. She returns to discover that after station debris reentered the atmosphere of and impacted her homeworld of Sphinx, many of her closest relatives have died.

The Solarian League's leadership learns of both events in quick succession. The incompetent League military leadership, finally realizing the true scale of disparity between their ships and weapon systems and Manticore's, decides to go forward with a plan to invade the Manticore System itself with a force of 400 super-dreadnoughts, believing that the aftermath of the (Mesan) strike will leave Manticore possibly unprotected and unwilling to fight a protracted war, even if they successfully defend against this initial invasion. This idea that Manticore's system defenses have also been wrecked has been secretly purported by Mesa, which desires a situation in which the League is severely bloodied by just such a hapless invasion attempt. Meanwhile, Manticore is informed of the impending Solarian offensive through a covert channel on Beowulf. Manticoran leadership is confident of their ability to repel any Solarian attempts to invade the Home System but at the cost of expending great amounts of ammunition, which is now a precious commodity.

The situation appears in crisis until Captain Anton Zilwicki of Manticore, who had been thought dead, and Special Officer Victor Cachat of Haven finally arrive in the Haven System with a Mesan defector. They inform President Eloise Pritchart of the truth behind the nuclear attacks on Mesa, and also of Mesa's long-term goals as an organization called the Mesan Alignment. The defector also gives background information on the new technology which was used to attack Manticore. Pritchart decides that the information is too important to ignore and personally embarks with several important members of her administration for Trevor's Star, along with Zilwicki's party. She eventually meets with Queen Elizabeth and Admiral Alexander-Harrington, and the true threat posed by Mesa becomes clear to all.

Both sides realize that they have been manipulated over the past several decades by Mesa to fight each other so that they should not pose a threat to Mesa's masterplan for galactic domination. Despite ongoing diplomatic problems between them, and the certainty that many political factions in both Haven and Manticore will strongly disapprove of cooperation in the wake of such a long and bloody conflict, Elizabeth and Pritchart agree to both end the war for good and tentatively form a military alliance against Mesa and their Solarian pawns as the Star Empire and its armed forces await the arrival of the Solarian attack.

== Reception ==
It debuted at #13 on the New York Times Hardcover Fiction Best Seller List.

The book was reviewed by Jackie Cassada for the Library Journal who noted that "Fully realized characters and an incisive understanding of the military mindset lend believability to this dynastic space opera sure to be popular with series fans and lovers of military sf". Roland Green writing for Booklist noted that "Readers may feel confident that they will be Honored many more times and enjoy it every time." The book also was reviewed for Publishers Weekly, with the reviewer there writing that "Weber... combines realistic, engaging characters with intelligent technological projection and a deep understanding of military bureaucracy in the long-awaited 12th Honor Harrington novel." Lardas Mark writing for The Daily News praised the book saying that "Whether you're a longtime Honor Harrington fan or just discovering the series you will find "Mission of Honor" absorbing from the first page to the last. Indeed, David Weber's last page contains the most satisfying ending in the entire series."

Preceded by At All Costs	Honor Harrington books	Succeeded by A Rising Thunder
