= Uncompromising Honor =

2018 novel by David Weber

- Original cover
- Author: David Weber
- Cover artist: David Mattingly
- Language: English
- Series: Honor Harrington
- Genre: Military science fiction
- Publisher: Baen Books
- Publication date: October 2, 2018
- Publication place: United States
- Media type: Print (hardback & paperback), e-book,
- ISBN: 9781625796677
- Preceded by: A Rising Thunder

Uncompromising Honor is a science fiction novel by American writer by David Weber, released on October 2, 2018 by Baen Books. It is the fourteenth novel set in the Honorverse in the main Honor Harrington series. It was the first main series Honor Harrington book in five years.

== Plot summary ==
The story occurs in 1922 and 1923 "Post Diaspora," or 4025/4026 CE. The Grand Alliance of the Star Empire of Manticore, the Republic of Haven, the Protectorate of Grayson, and the newly independent Republic of Beowulf, among others, are at war with the Solarian League.

The Mesan Alignment, having worked for centuries in the background to establish a new galactic order under which it can impose genetic modification of the human race, has suffered several setbacks in recent years at the hands of the Alliance, especially those of Admiral Honor Harrington of Manticore. In response, the Alignment's leaders arrange an escalating series of atrocities.

While the League has an elected government, executive power is dominated by the Quintet, senior bureaucrats who hold permanent tenure in "Old Chicago," Planet Earth. The Alignment has extensively infiltrated the League's political and military institutions, but the "Mandarins," as they are commonly known, refuse to believe they are being played as they wage war on the Alliance.

The Mandarins are forced to grapple with the Alliance's massive technological and tactical advantages; the Solarian League Navy cannot hope to fight a pitched battle and survive, even with vastly superior numbers. Alignment agents convince them to authorize "Operation Buccaneer," the complete destruction of all space-borne infrastructure in every star system that continues to trade with their enemies. League commanders are given discretion to arrange for the evacuation of civilians first, but the "Parthian Shot" contingency authorizes mass-casualty hit-and-run raids as needed.

The Royal Manticoran Navy annihilates League raiding forces in the Prime and Ajay systems; a Manticoran detachment later beats back a raid on the Hypatia System, at the cost of 90 percent casualties. Later on, the Alignment accelerates "Operation Houdini" on the planet Mesa itself, which has been occupied by the Alliance; dozens of nuclear charges are detonated across the planet to erase evidence of the Alignment's existence and frame the Alliance for the deaths of millions of civilians.

Events come to a head when the League invades Beowulf. Though Alliance defenses are sabotaged by a secret Alignment weapon, the defenders still manage to defeat the League force. However, the Alignment has smuggled nuclear weapons aboard Beowulf's orbital habitats. The detonations kill more than 43 million people, mostly civilians, but also large numbers of Alliance officials. (Harrington's husband, Admiral Alexander, barely escapes with his life.) The bombings occur well after the total defeat of the League force, showing who is responsible.

In response, the Alliance decides to bring a swift end to its conflict with the League. In "Operation Nemesis," Admiral Harrington and her Grand Fleet enter the Solar System and demonstrate their overwhelming technological superiority, forcing the surrender of the Solarian League Navy without suffering a single casualty. To punish the League for its aggression and atrocities, Harrington has 2,000 years of built-up orbital infrastructure throughout the Solar System destroyed, although no civilians are killed. Harrington threatens to repeat this action in the next four most wealthy systems, and then the next four, and so on, unless the League accepts the surrender terms. The Mandarins refuse to give up, but military and political leaders on Earth, having uncovered the Alignment's infiltration of the League, depose them and promulgate reforms.

== Reception ==
Uncompromising Honor debuted at #9 on the New York Times Bestseller List.

The novel won the 2019 Dragon Awards in the Best Military Science Fiction or Fantasy Novel category.

Mark Lardas writing for The Daily News concluded that it is a "ripping good space opera". Don Vicha writing for Booklist praised Weber for "all the hard-and software details and tactical proficiency that [he] delivers like no one else, along with a large cast of well-developed, believable characters, giving each clash of fleets emotional weight." The reviewer for Publishers Weekly called the series "a juggernaut of military science fiction", cautioning that "the 14th novel in Weber's bestselling series (not counting spin-offs) offers no summary to orient readers". Carolyn Haley in her review for the New York Journal of Books wrote that criticized the book for not utilizing the titular character (Honor Harrington) until the final part, although she concluded that when that happens, Honor "lives up to all we expect of her, so the conclusion is satisfying".

The book was also reviewed by Don Sakers (2019) in Analog Science Fiction and Fact, January–February 2019.
