= A Rising Thunder =

2012 novel by David Weber

- Original cover
- Author: David Weber
- Cover artist: David Mattingly
- Language: English
- Series: Honor Harrington series
- Genre: Military science fiction
- Publisher: Baen Books
- Publication date: March 1, 2012
- Publication place: United States
- Media type: Print (hardback & paperback), E-book, Audiobook
- Pages: 464
- ISBN: 978-1-4516-3806-6
- Preceded by: Mission of Honor
- Followed by: Uncompromising Honor

A Rising Thunder is a science fiction novel by American writer by David Weber, released on March 6, 2012 by Baen Books. It is the thirteenth novel set in the Honorverse in the main Honor Harrington series. The novel was originally split into two books due to its size, leading in a delay of publication.

== Plot summary ==
The book begins in March 1922 P.D., sometime before the end of the previous novel, as tensions continue to escalate between the Star Empire of Manticore and the Solarian League after a number of battles. Manticore recalls all of its merchant vessels from Solarian space, and takes control of several wormholes, denying access to Solarian traffic. As the repercussions of these actions begin to reverberate throughout the League, its unelected controlling bureaucrats, known derisively as "the five Mandarins", start feeling the pressure from the transstellar corporations and criticism from the media. While it is clear that Manticore is in a position to inflict tremendous damage to the League economy, the Mandarins are not willing to pay the political and diplomatic price of taking responsibility for the actions of the League Navy, and continue to believe in the League Navy's technological superiority over the mere "neobarbs" of the Star Empire. They support Admiral Rajampet's planned invasion of the Manticore System, despite the risk that failure would make them look even weaker.

In the meantime, Captain Anton Zilwicki and Agent Victor Cachat arrive on Haven and present to President Eloise Pritchart their evidence of Mesan involvement in the assassinations that triggered the resumption of hostilities between Haven and Manticore. Upon hearing this and supporting information from a Mesan defector, Dr. Herlander Simões, Pritchart sets out on an unprecedented state visit to Manticore. The evidence is presented to a reluctant Empress Elizabeth, who is finally convinced that Haven is no longer the enemy and agrees not only to negotiate a peace treaty but to accept Pritchart's offer of military alliance against the upcoming League attack (a "re-run" of the same scene from Mission of Honor). Hearing about this visit and the intelligence Zilwicki and Cachat brought with them regarding Mesa's plans, the Beowulf government joins the new "Grand Alliance". Shortly afterward, Protector Benjamin Mayhew arrives from Grayson to participate in the peace talks and to represent the other members of the Manticoran Alliance. The Sphinxian treecats, of whom Honor's companion Nimitz is one, communicate to Honor their ability to detect the instant when a Mesan nanotech victim is triggered and offer to help defend the humans against it.

At Beowulf, a fleet meant to reinforce the League's 11th Fleet attempts to transition through the wormhole junction but is forced to retreat by the combined forces of the Beowulf System Defense Force and a Manticoran task force under the command of Admiral Alice Truman. Meanwhile, Solarian Admiral Filareta arrives at Manticore at the head of 11th Fleet, 427 superdreadnoughts strong, to find Honor with only 40 Manticoran SDs to her name. He confidently ignores her warnings that the Alliance is more than ready to deal with his attack. Harrington's trap involves another 150 Grayson SDs lying in stealth in front of 11th Fleet, while Haven's 250 SDs drop out of hyperspace behind it. (The Second Battle of Manticore, like the first, sets a record as the largest space battle in history.) Filareta realizes that his position is hopeless and orders a surrender, but his operations officer, a victim of the Mesan nanotech, instead triggers a wild launch of unarmed missiles and then a hidden bomb, destroying the flagship's bridge and killing everyone therein including himself. The resulting "battle" ends with nearly 300 Solarian ships destroyed at the cost of only a few LACs, and 1.2 million Solarians KIA, another 1.4 million captured, to a mere 2,000 Alliance casualties.

Upon news of 11th Fleet's destruction, the Mandarins find themselves having to deal with the resulting blow to the League's prestige. They accuse Manticore of perfidy and Beowulf of treason for its discordance with League policy towards Manticore. Their efforts to sway the public are successful. Meanwhile, Queen Elizabeth helps organize the marriage of the heir apparent, Prince Roger, to which much of Haven's political leaders are invited. President Pritchart announces that their peace treaty has been ratified by the Haven senate and that the Second Havenite-Manticoran War is officially over.

Admiral Rajampet is forced to kill himself by Mesan nanotech control. His deputy, Admiral Winston Kingsford, becomes the acting head of the Solarian League Navy. He informs Kolokoltsov that Manticore's technological advantage is so overwhelming that any further military confrontations would be a one-sided massacre similar to the Second Battle of Manticore. Even worse is the economic and political analysis. Ultimately, Kingsford presents Kolokoltsov with their only option: fighting a commerce-raiding war, until they can match Manticore's military capability or sue for terms. Kolokoltsov convinces the other Mandarins that their best chance to stay in power is to adopt Kingsford's recommendations, score some victories and only then attempt a negotiated settlement. They also have the Beowulfan government investigated for treason to divert attention away from their own failings. This maneuver results in the head of the Beowulf delegation to the Assembly declaring that her government intends to invoke a never-before-used section of the League constitution which allows member systems to secede from the League, to be confirmed by a referendum of Beowulfan voters (which is certain to pass by a huge majority).

== Reception ==
A Rising Thunder debuted at #3 on the New York Times Bestseller List. It dropped to #15 in the second week, #25 in the third week, #27 in the fourth week, and dropped off the list on April 22, 2012.

Liz Bourke, in her review on Tor.com, expressed disappointment in the "continuing...lack of focus" in the recent Honor Harrington books, which lack the "enthusiasm and vibrancy" of the earlier books. She also found "the spiraling profusion of names" caused problems in the political discussions and battle sequences, allowing for "little unity". Despite the problems she found, Bourke says there are "flashes" of the "solid character[s] and solid action and a relatively entertaining flow of techsposition", just less than is usually found in Weber's work.

=== Other reviews ===
- Review by Don Sakers (2012) in Analog Science Fiction and Fact, July–August 2012

| Preceded by Mission of Honor | Honor Harrington books | Succeeded by Uncompromising Honor |
