= Beginnings (Honorverse) =

- Author: David Weber, Charles E. Gannon, Timothy Zahn, Joelle Presby.
- Cover artist: David Mattingly
- Language: English
- Series: Honorverse
- Genre: Military science fiction
- Publisher: Baen Books
- Publication date: July 2013
- Publication place: United States
- Media type: Print (hardcover)
- ISBN: 9781451639032
- Preceded by: House of Steel

Beginnings is the sixth volume in the Worlds of Honor series in the Honorverse. It was published by Baen Books on July 2, 2013.

The book includes five stories:

- "By the Book" by Charles E. Gannon is an atypical story because it is set in the Solar System in the near future, more than 1200 years before any other story in the Honorverse.
- "A Call to Arms" by Timothy Zahn, is set in the beginnings of the Kingdom of Manticore, with the only attack on it before Honor Harrington's epoch.
  This was later re-worked into a book of the same name, by David Weber & Timothy Zahn with Thomas Pope, published in September 2015 as the second of the Manticore Ascendant series.
- "Beauty and the Beast" by David Weber, with the difficult beginnings of the relationship between Honor's future parents on Beowulf.
- "The Best Laid Plans" by David Weber, where the young Honor meets the treecat Laughs Brightly.
- "Obligated Service" by Joelle Presby, where a young Grayson woman who joined the Navy by obligation to her family changes her views, her situation and the situation of those around her. This story develops the story begun in the "Grayson letters".
