= Grav wave =

grav wave may refer to:

- gravitational wave, a concept in general relativity, a type of gravitational radiation
- gravity wave, a concept in fluid dynamics, a type of wave oscillation
- grav-wave, a fictional concept from the Honorverse, key to several plot points
