= Old Soldiers (disambiguation) =

Old Soldiers is a 2005 science fiction novel by David Weber.

Old Soldiers may also refer to:

- Old Soldiers (TV play), 1964
- "Old Soldiers" (Doctors), a 2001 television episode
- "Old Soldiers" (X-Men: The Animated Series), a 1997 television episode
- "Old Soldiers" (audio drama), a 2007 episode of Doctor Who: The Companion Chronicles
