= In Enemy Hands =

In Enemy Hands may refer to:

- In Enemy Hands (novel), novel by David Weber
- In Enemy Hands (film), 2004 American film
