= War of Honor =

2002 science fiction novel by David Weber

- First edition
- Author: David Weber
- Cover artist: David Mattingly
- Language: English
- Series: Honor Harrington series
- Genre: Military science fiction
- Publisher: Baen Books
- Publication date: 2002
- Publication place: United States
- Media type: Print (hardback & paperback)
- Pages: 880
- ISBN: 0-7434-3545-1
- OCLC: 50244019
- Dewey Decimal: 813/.54 21
- LC Class: PS3573.E217 W375 2002
- Preceded by: Ashes of Victory
- Followed by: At All Costs

War of Honor is a science fiction novel by American writer David Weber, and the tenth book in the Honor Harrington series. It was first published in 2002.

== Plot summary ==
Five years have passed since a truce was reached between Manticore and Haven, but there is still no formal peace treaty. Even though neither side wishes to resume fighting, political circumstances in both nations threaten to plunge them into war.

On Manticore, the administration of Prime Minister High Ridge focuses on strengthening its political position. They are determined to remain at least technically at war with Haven - peace would terminate the special war taxes they are diverting from the Royal Manticoran Navy's budget for their welfare programs and vote-buying schemes, and would end their ability to postpone elections in which they expect to lose their fragile majority. Manticore's allies, most notably Grayson and Erewhon, are infuriated with the new government's carelessness and outright rudeness in foreign affairs. From their seats in the House of Lords, Honor Harrington and Hamish Alexander voice their opposition to the High Ridge Administration's policies, and the government takes actions to discredit the war heroes.

Haven struggles to rebuild after the fall of the People's Republic. President Pritchart's administration faces increasing pressure from certain political factions that demand the Republic be more assertive in its negotiations with the Star Kingdom. Admiral Thomas Theisman has to restore the Havenite Navy's morale and fighting capabilities after the long war with Manticore and a protracted campaign to conquer the remnants of the old People's Republic.

The Andermani Empire, at the encouragement of the Republic's secretary of state, has adopted a confrontational stance with Manticore over the chaos-ridden Silesian Confederacy, and Honor Harrington is sent to the planet Sidemore, located near Silesian space, with a task force. She is ordered to go to Silesia at the behest of the Royal Navy's new management, who wishes to get her out of the political arena. The intention is to keep a close eye on the Andermani and their activities, and the risk of war between Manticore and the Empire is steadily rising.

Tensions also rise between Haven and Manticore. A new terminus of the Manticore Wormhole Junction has been discovered, and several worlds located near the new terminus request annexation into Manticore, triggering fears amongst the Havenites that Manticore is going to go on an expansionist rampage. The Manticoran government's ineptness and the schemes of some members of the Havenite government compound an already unstable scenario, and President Pritchart orders the Havenite Navy to launch "Operation Thunderbolt": the resumption of combat operations against Manticore.

War breaks out again. In a series of coordinated attacks the Havenites succeed in conquering every system the Manticorans had taken from them (except San Martin, which is recognized as a part of the Star Kingdom) and in devastating a critical Manticoran shipyard. Even Honor's fleet is attacked, despite the long distance between Haven and Sidemore, but, reinforced by the Protector's Own division of the Grayson Navy, she succeeds in defeating the Havenite forces. Baron High Ridge attempts to spread the blame around by forming a coalition government, but the Queen refuses the "request" of the Baron to convene a government. Because of this, High Ridge and all members of his government are left solely responsible for the criminally negligent handling of the military and the peace talks. The High Ridge administration falls in disgrace, and a new government takes over in the Star Kingdom, composed of the remnants of the earlier Cromarty government with Hamish Alexander's brother William as Prime Minister.

Now Haven is almost the technological equal of Manticore and its fleet of modern warships is significantly larger than the Manticoran navy. Erewhon has broken out of the Manticoran Alliance and has sided with Haven, handing them many of the latest technological developments of the Star Kingdom. The Havenites have the initiative and the Star Kingdom is shocked. However, the Andermani Empire joins the Manticoran side in the new war.

== Reviews ==
- Review by Carolyn Cushman (2002) in Locus, #500 September 2002
- (Polish) Review by Jerzy Stachowicz (2006) in Nowa Fantastyka, #283 April 2006 p71

Preceded by Ashes of Victory	Honor Harrington books	Succeeded by At All Costs
