= Crown of Slaves =

2003 novel by David Weber and Eric Flint

- First edition
- Author: David Weber
- Cover artist: David Mattingly
- Language: English
- Series: Honor Harrington series
- Genre: Science fiction novel
- Publication date: 4/1/2003
- Publication place: United States
- Media type: Print (hardback & paperback)
- ISBN: 978-0-7434-7148-0
- OCLC: 52547560
- Dewey Decimal: 813/.54 22
- LC Class: PS3573.E217 C76 2003
- Followed by: Torch of Freedom

Crown of Slaves is a 2003 novel by David Weber and Eric Flint set in the Honorverse; it has been billed as the first in the Crown of Slaves series, spun off from the main Honor Harrington series.

It features Honor herself only in a cameo role: other characters from the novels and several short stories take centre stage. These include Captain Anton Zilwicki and his adopted daughter Berry, introduced in From the Highlands, and Ruth Winton, introduced in Promised Land. "Jeremy X", the terrorist leader of the Audubon Ballroom, and Victor Cachat, one of the Republic of Haven's most capable agents, also appear.

== Plot summary ==
The novel continues the events that happened on From the Highlands, and is set over the background of the fight against genetic slavery.

The story begins after the truce between Manticore and Haven. Captain Zilwicki, his adopted daughter Berry, Princess Ruth Winton and the slave-turned-professor W.E.B. Du Havel are sent as Queen Elizabeth III's (not the Manticoran government's) official representatives to the funeral of a notorious Solarian anti-slavery activist, which will take place in Erewhon, a disgruntled member of the Manticoran Alliance.

Erewhon's location between Manticore, Haven and the Solarian League makes it a place where agents from the different star nations can play the intelligence game. From the first moment, Zilwicki, Berry and Ruth get entangled in a complex situation involving Havenite agents, ambitious Solarian Navy officers, violent Masadan mercenaries, the Audubon Ballroom and the powerful Mesan corporation Manpower Incorporated.

Each faction has interests of its own, which collide with those of the others: the Manticorans want to salvage their relation with Erewhon (and upset the Prime Minister who allowed that relationship to sour). The Havenites intend to show support for the anti-slavery cause and improve their own relationship with Erewhon, with the unstated goal of breaking Erewhon away from Manticore. The Erewhonese want someone — anyone — to help them deal with a Mesan-owned planet which is a threat to their security. The Solarian officers work to further the interests of a powerful political patron who believes that the League is on the verge of collapse and wants to be prepared for that event. The Mesans want to stay out of the limelight and prevent all the other factions from attacking their major industry: slave trading, while the Audubon Ballroom simply wants to hit Mesa anywhere they can. And even the Masadan mercenaries employed by the Mesans have their own agenda: to force Manticore to free several of their imprisoned companions.

The clash of interests comes to a head with an attempted kidnapping on Berry Zilwicki and Ruth Winton (who happens to be the sister of the leader of the Masadan mercenaries) aboard The Wages of Sin, Erewhon's main civilian space station. After Manpower's involvement is discovered, a haphazard alliance between the Manticorans, Solarians, Havenites and the Ballroom is organized to launch an attack on the Mesan-owned planet Verdant Vista, popularly known as "Congo".

The planet is taken from Manpower's hands, and it is decided to transform it into an independent nation of its own for escaped slaves, so that the conflict against Mesa may have a nation sponsoring it. The novel ends with Berry Zilwicki being crowned as Berry I, Queen of the new Kingdom of Torch.

== Reviews ==
- Review by Rochelle Buck (2003) in Deep Magic, #18, November 2003
- (Polish): Nowa Fantastyka 12/2005, p. 70
