= Worlds of Weber =

Short story collection by David Weber

Worlds of Weber: Ms. Midshipwoman Harrington and Other Stories
- Author: David Weber
- Cover artist: Bob Eggleton
- Language: English
- Genre: Science fiction novel
- Publisher: Subterranean Press (hardcover); Baen Books (paperback); Baen Ebooks
- Publication date: September 30, 2008 (hardcover); October 2009 (paperback)
- Publication place: United States
- Media type: Print (hardback & paperback), e-book
- Pages: 609 (hardcover); 960 (paperback)
- ISBN: 978-1-59606-177-4 (hc); ISBN 978-1-4391-3314-9 (pb); ISBN 1-4391-3314-X (pb)
- OCLC: 243941482

Worlds of Weber: Ms. Midshipwoman Harrington and Other Stories is a collection of short works by David Weber published in hardcover in September 2008 by Subterranean Press. Mass market paperback and e-book editions were released in October 2009 by Baen Books.

== Stories ==
Contents:	"Universe"
Introduction	(not applicable)
A Certain Talent	Roger Zelazny's "The Williamson Effect"
In the Navy	Grantville (1632 series)
The Captain From Kirkbean	Alternate Generals
Sir George and the Dragon	David Drake's Foreign Legions.
Sword Brother	Weber's own "War God series"
A Beautiful Friendship	Honorverse, (HHA1)
Ms. Midshipwoman Harrington	Honorverse, (HHA3)
Miles to Go	Keith Laumer's Bolos 3
The Traitor	Keith Laumer's Bolos 4

== Blurb ==
The following is a quote from Baen's promotional "blurb" about the book:

A mammoth volume (over 250,000 words) of the many facets of one of science fiction's most popular talents. Here are treecats, starships, dragons, alternate history, self-aware Bolo supertanks, wizards, sailing ships, ironclads—and, of course, Weber's fantastically popular starship commander, Honor Harrington. For nearly two decades, David Weber has been taking enthralled readers to destinations strange and fantastical, from his best-selling Honor Harrington novels and short stories to the heroic fantasy of Bahzell of the Hrandai, and the shared universe stories set in worlds of his own creation, and those of others, such as Eric Flint's best-selling Ring of Fire series, the popular Bolo series of Keith Laumer and more.

Visit 17th-century Magdeburg for the creation of the United States Navy a hundred and fifty years early, and go with John Paul Jones as he wins the Revolutionary War—For George III. Fight dragons and demons with U.S. Marines in a most unexpected campaign, find out how humans and treecats first met and share Honor Harrington's very first battle...

== See also ==
- Honorverse
- 1632 series
