= Torch of Freedom =

2009 novel by David Weber and Eric Flint

- First edition
- Author: David Weber and Eric Flint
- Cover artist: David Mattingly
- Language: English
- Series: Honor Harrington series
- Genre: Science fiction novel
- Publisher: Baen Books
- Publication date: November 3, 2009
- Publication place: United States
- Media type: Print (hardback & paperback)
- Pages: 602
- ISBN: 1-4391-3305-0 (ISBN 978-1-4391-3305-7)
- OCLC: 311764117
- Preceded by: Crown of Slaves
- Followed by: Cauldron of Ghosts

Torch of Freedom is a science fiction novel by American writers David Weber and Eric Flint, published on November 3, 2009. It is the second book in the Crown of Slaves series which runs parallel (timeline-wise) to the main Honor Harrington series. It is the sequel to the 2003 novel Crown of Slaves, also by David Weber and Eric Flint. The book includes a Baen CD Library disk.

== Plot ==
While Anton Zilwicki and Victor Cachat were working undercover on Mesa, Mesa launches an attack at Torch. Anton Zilwicki and Victor Cachat escape Mesa amidst general mayhem together with a defecting leading scientist. The attack against Torch is thwarted by Rear Admiral Luiz Rozsak of the Solarian League Navy, who had amassed a fleet in the interest of the Maya Sector.

Queen Berry becomes romantically involved with Hugh Arai, who, after being freed from slavery by Jeremy X from the Audubon Ballroom, worked as a commando for the Beowulf Biological Survey Corps (BSC), and was assigned by Jeremy X as Berry's bodyguard.

== Reception ==
The book was reviewed by Daniel Ostrowski for the Polish fanzine Fahrenheit.

Preceded by Crown of Slaves	Honor Harrington books	Succeeded by Cauldron of Ghosts
