= Old Soldiers =

2005 novel by David Weber

- First edition (publ. Baen Books); Cover art by David Mattingly
- Author: David Weber
- Language: English
- Publisher: Baen Books
- Publication date: 2005
- ISBN: 1-4165-0898-8 (first edition)
- Dewey Decimal: 813.54
- LC Class: PS3573.E217 O43

Old Soldiers (2005) is a science fiction novel by American writer David Weber, a sequel to the short story "With Your Shield" published in the anthology Bolo!, edited by the same writer. It details the future of the two survivors of that battle as they try to keep alive a remnant of humanity, deliberately separated off and sent far away from the war that is consuming both sides completely.
