= The Apocalypse Troll =

1999 novel by David Weber

- First edition
- Author: David Weber
- Cover artist: Charles Keegan
- Language: English
- Genre: Science fiction novel
- Publisher: Baen Books
- Publication date: 1999
- Publication place: United States
- Media type: Print (Paperback) & E-book
- Pages: 320
- ISBN: 978-0-671-57845-9
- Dewey Decimal: 813/.54 21
- LC Class: PS3573.E217 A8 1999

The Apocalypse Troll is a novel by American writer David Weber, first published by Baen Books in January 1999. It is a story about time travel and alien invasion.

== Plot summary ==
The story opens in the 25th Century, when a small force of human warships encounter a larger group of Kanga ships 'forty light-months from anywhere in particular'. The Kanga are a violently xenophobic alien race who have tried and failed to wipe out humanity in a war they are losing, which has lasted over 400 years. It becomes apparent that the Kanga force is a final desperate attempt to defeat the humans by using an untried time travel theory to go back in time many thousands of years and wipe out humanity before it became a threat. They will have to be stopped by any means.

They were partially successful and both humans and kangas arrived in the outer solar system in early 21st century. A final battle results in a single human space fighter chasing a kanga tender and its escort of fighters to the outer atmosphere of Earth. Only the accidental involvement of a task force of the US Navy prevented the death of humanity. The human fighter crashed into the ocean and one enemy fighter survived.

The badly injured human pilot survives her crash landing and is rescued by a passing yacht. The yacht is crewed singlehanded by a US Navy SEAL on his retirement cruise (Captain Dick Aston). The very young looking pilot is in a coma and has a hole right through her. The wound starts to heal before Dick's eyes and he spends the next 4 days feeding her while she remains in a healing trance. When she wakes she informs Dick she is Colonel Ludmilla Leonovna of the Terran Marines and no she isn't a Russian.

Ludmilla tells the story of the war and her arrival in 2007. Her healing is caused by a symbiote which came from a mutated bio-weapon of the Kanga, it helps its host in many ways. She also tells Dick that the enemy fighter is ‘crewed’ by a Troll. A Troll is psychopathic cyborg with a human brain created by the Kanga as warriors. Trolls hate both humanity and kangas and love to kill cruelly. Trolls also have a limited telepathic ability to read and influence about 30% of minds. Ludmilla is convinced the Troll will try to enslave or destroy humanity.

The next ten chapters deal with letting the world know about the troll without the troll knowing they know. Plans to destroy the troll are made while waiting for the troll to reveal itself. An impossible theft of Plutonium in the US concentrates plans there. Eventually the troll reveals itself by inculcating racial hatreds in a circular area of the southern US.

A final battle with the troll and its minions takes place in the mountains of North Carolina. Ludmilla destroys the troll at great risk to herself. However, in the process Dick is struck with a lethal weapon, and in desperation Ludmilla injects him with a sample of her own blood which while almost certainly lethal (as the bio-weapon is to more than 99% of the human race) hardly matters now.

Sometime later Dick revives and finds himself growing younger with his own symbiote in place, as he recovers the President visits and confirms that the Trolls ship was captured intact and he outlines plans to reverse engineer it and create a world government ensuring that this time the Kangas won't get anywhere near Earth, and humanity will be spared five centuries of war.

The President allows the two to slip away into hiding listed as dead in battle, and a few months later the couple are on their new yacht in the Pacific as they await a flash in the night sky, the silent monument to a crew who died centuries from home to save an Earth not their own.
