= Jan Kotouč =

Czech science fiction writer

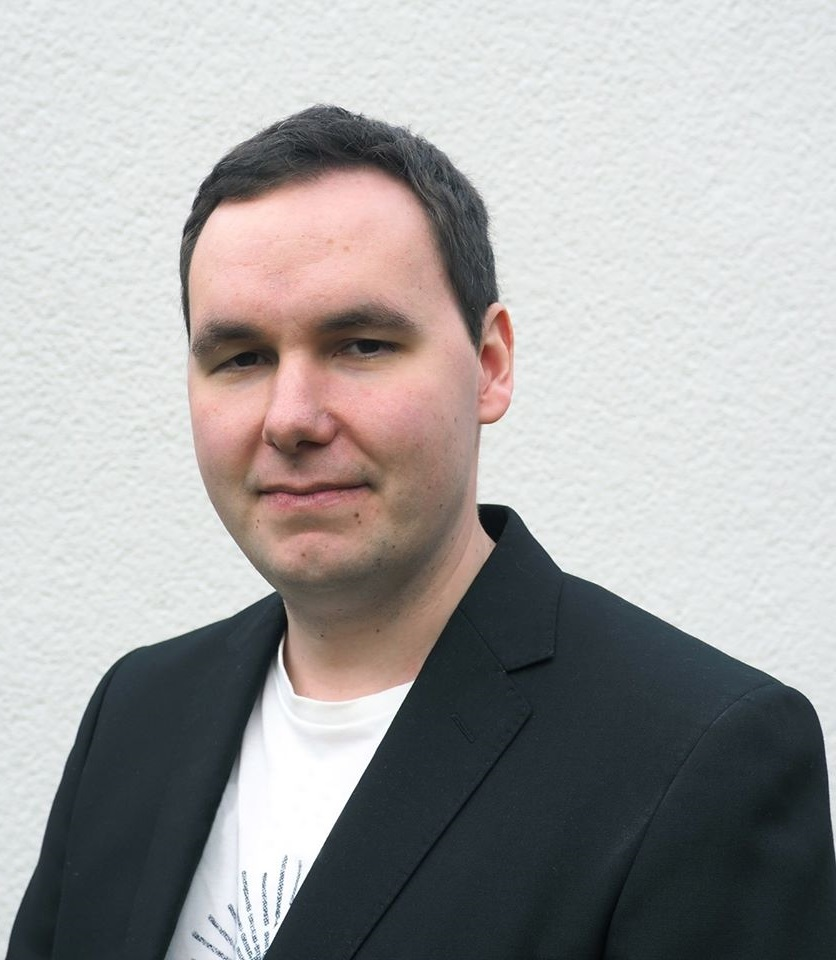
- Jan Kotouč (Feb 2020)
- Born: 1987 (age 38–39); Prague, Czech Republic
- Years active: 2008
- Website: www.jan-kotouc.cz

Jan Kotouč (born 1987) is a Czech military science fiction and space opera author. He is the author of several science fiction books and creator of Hirano Sector universe.

== Early life ==
Kotouč graduated from University of New York in Prague/La Salle University in 2013, with a master's degree in Mass Media and Communication.

== Writing career ==
Kotouč began writing short fan fiction stories taking place in the Star Wars universe, which he published on a Czech fan fiction website Jediland. He eventually began to write stories from his own created universe, Hirano Sector, a place on the verge of large scale inter-planetary conflict. In 2008 his novella from Hirano universe, Příliš blízké setkání (Eng: Too Close Encounter) won the Czech Cena Karla Čapka award in its category. It was subsequently published in Mlok anthology and in 2010 as a novel.

His first published novel was Pokračování diplomacie (2009; Eng: Continuation of Diplomacy). In 2012, his two-volume novel, Tristanská občanská válka (Eng: Tristan Civil War) was voted Book of the Year at the Aeronautilus Awards. The same year, Kotouč received an Encouragement Award from the European Science Fiction Society.

== Published works ==
Source: Legie

=== Sektor Hirano series ===
- Příliš blízké setkání (2008), novella published in Mlok anthology, rewritten and published as a novel in 2010; in English as Too close an encounter (2019)
- Pokračování diplomacie (2009)
- Tristanská občanská válka (2011), two volumes
- Volání do zbraně (2012)
- Na prahu očistce (2014)
- Bitva o Sinaj (2015)
- Simeral v plamenech (2016)
- Cíl: Kasimir (2017)

=== České země series ===
- Nad českými zeměmi slunce nezapadá (2016)
- Ofenziva českých zemí (2017)
- V tajné službě Koruny české (2019)
- Spojenci českých zemí (2020)

=== Agent John Francis Kovář series ===
This series was created by Miroslav Žamboch and Jiří Walker Procházka with books also written by other Czech authors.

- Invaze (2013), Agent John Francis Kovář volume 31

=== Central Imperium series ===
- Hranice Impéria (2019), in English as Frontiers of the Imperium (2019)
- Císař v exilu (2019), in English as Emperor in exile (2020)
- Obránci civilizace (2020), in English as Defenders of Civilization (2020)
- Odkaz Protektorů (2020), in English as The Protectors' Legacy (2022)

=== Other works ===
- Malá apokalypsa, Pevnost magazine 2011/10
- Nová éra, Pevnost magazine 2012/02
- Válečné hry, in Zpěv kovových velryb (2014), in English as War Games in Dreams from Beyond (2016)
- Velitelské rozhodnutí, XB-1 magazine 2013/07
- Bez iluzí, in Soumrak světů (2014), Agent John Francis Kovář volume 33
- Ex Luna, Annihilatio, in Capricorn 70 (2015)
- Zpátky do služby, part of e-book release Volání do zbraně (2015)
- Návrat na Tristan, part of e-book release Na prahu očistce (2015)
- Argentinské probuzení, in Ve stínu Říše (2017)
- Cena za službu, in Space opera 2018 (2018)
- Po Velké bouři, in Ve stínu apokalypsy (2018)
- Hippocratic Oath, in From the Ashes: Stories from The Fallen World (2019), in English only
