= Fire Season =

2012 novel by David Weber and Jane Lindskold

- Author: David Weber
- Cover artist: Daniel Dos Santos
- Language: English
- Series: Honor Harrington series
- Genre: Science fiction, young adult
- Publisher: Baen Books
- Publication date: October 15, 2012
- Publication place: United States
- Media type: Print (Hardback)
- Pages: 368
- ISBN: 978-1-4516-3840-0
- Preceded by: A Beautiful Friendship
- Followed by: Treecat Wars (2013)

Fire Season is a 2012 young adult science fiction novel by American authors David Weber and Jane Lindskold. Set in the fictional Honorverse, it is the second book in the prequel Stephanie Harrington series, part of the multi-part Honor Harrington series. It is a sequel to the 2011 A Beautiful Friendship by Weber.

Stephanie Harrington is an ancestor of the main series character Honor Harrington.

== Plot summary ==
The story takes place a few years after Stephanie Harrington is adopted by a Sphinxian treecat whom she has named Lionheart (and whose name among his own people is "Climbs Quickly"). During this time, Lionheart has witnessed Stephanie grow into a clever and confident human teenager. Yet Stephanie's move into adulthood comes at crucial time on many levels. Sphinx is undergoing "Fire Season" and Stephanie and her friend Karl Zivonik are constantly on fire duty to prevent the more dangerous brush fires from endangering the human population and the treecats. She and Karl personally save two treecat twin brothers, named Left-Stripe and Right-Stripe, from such a forest fire and deliver them both to her xeno-veterinarian father for treatment. Stephanie is also forced to contend with an official anthropological survey team that arrives in the kingdom with the express purpose of studying the treecats to determine whether or not they are sentient. Stephanie takes an immediate liking to the teenage son of the survey team's lead scientist, Anders Whittaker. Unbeknownst to Stephanie, Dr. Bradford Whittaker has intentionally brought his son along for this express purpose, believing that he and his team would need to circumvent the "paternalistic" Sphinx Forestry Service and its attempts to shield the treecats and Stephanie from him and his team.

With Stephanie's fifteenth birthday approaching, Stephanie is looking forward to getting tested on an aircar and obtaining a piloting license for her birthday. However, she is disappointed to hear that her parents have already planned a birthday party for her instead. While they have already invited her colleagues from the SFS as well as Dr. Scott MacDallan, his wife Irina and his treecat companion Fisher, she is told to invite any of her friends from the hang-gliding club, as her parents feel that she needs to spend more time with kids her age. Reluctantly, she invites the kids she most gets along with as well as Jessica Pheriss, a newcomer to Sphinx. She is later horrified to discover that her mother had accidentally invited her least favorite person in the club, Trudy Franchitti, but her horror is forgotten however when her mother also says she invited Anders as well. The party is a major success, as the hang-gliding club's members land at Stephanie's freehold and eat her mother's recent botanical experiments. It takes a serious dive however, when Trudy arrogantly expresses her hope that the survey team remain impartial about the treecats, as her wealthy family has much invested in the land the treecats live on. Stephanie shows considerable maturity in answering Trudy's comments without lashing out at her for her insensitivity and finds an unexpected ally in Jessica, who also looks upon Trudy with disfavor. In the aftermath of the party, Stephanie and Jessica become friends, with Stephanie discovering the Jessica's family is both large and poor, the result of her parents' wanderlust and her father being a "drifter". She asks her mother to offer Jessica's mother a job as a research assistant in her botanical experiments. Though her mother thinks Mrs. Pheriss might be a good fit, she cautions Stephanie about charity as her experience with Trudy has proven how it can backfire.

Meanwhile, Dr. Whittaker decides to study an abandoned treecat settlement without notifying the SFS and takes Anders and the rest of the team with him. Unfortunately, he lands them in a nearby bog and the air van begins to sink. His assistant, Dr. Langston Nez, manages to salvage much of their equipment from the air van but is seriously injured trying to get out. They soon discover that their communicators don't work for some reason and they realize that they are stranded without anyone knowing where to find them. The survey team's absence is eventually noticed by the spouses of two of its members and Stephanie, fearing for Anders, volunteers to search for them. The search is called off however when two large-scale fires break out and Stephanie and Karl are called in to help. Though ordered only to observe and report upon the progress of one of the fires, Lionheart soon detects the presence of a whole treecat clan trying to escape the fire and frantically gestures for them to go help. It soon becomes obvious that this treecat clan is far more leery of the humans than other treecats and Stephanie is forced to call in "reinforcements" – her friends from the hang-glider club – while Lionheart tries to reason with the clan. They manage to contain the fire long enough to evacuate the clan in one of her friend's vans, though not before Jessica and another treecat are almost killed by an exploding tree. As a consequence of this, Jessica finds herself bonded to the treecat she saved. It is then that the clan suddenly hears from Left-Stripe and Right-Stripe that there are humans in their previous nesting place and that they are in danger. Following Lionheart and the clan's gestures, Stephanie and her friends find the survey team just as a local swamp predator is closing in. Before Stephanie can shoot the creature with her pistol, the treecat clan runs to the surrounding trees and begins emitting a caterwauling that drives the creature off. With the survey team and the treecat clan rescued, Stephanie avoids any official sanctions for defying orders. Thankfully, Dr. Nez manages to live through the ordeal, which means the survey team can stay, despite Dr. Whittaker's actions. While Stephanie is overjoyed that Anders won't be leaving, Lionheart reflects upon how recent events have affected his people's attitudes towards the humans and how much larger his world has become with the humans in it.

== Reception ==
- Review by Carolyn Cushman (2013) in Locus, #624 January 2013
- Review by Don Sakers (2013) in Analog Science Fiction and Fact, April 2013
