= A Beautiful Friendship (novel) =

2011 novel by David Weber

- Hardcover cover
- Author: David Weber
- Cover artist: Daniel Dos Santos
- Language: English
- Series: Honor Harrington series
- Genre: Science fiction
- Published: 2011 (Baen Books)
- Publication place: United States
- Media type: Print (Hardback & Paperback)
- Pages: 361
- ISBN: 978-1-4516-3747-2
- LC Class: Pz7.W38747Be
- Followed by: Fire Season

A Beautiful Friendship is a 2011 young adult science fiction novel by American author David Weber. Set in the fictional Honorverse, the book serves as a prequel to the main Honor Harrington series, which takes place hundreds of years later in the fictional timeline.

It features Stephanie Harrington, an ancestor of the main character Honor Harrington who has been mentioned a number of times. The book is in fact based on a short story of the same name first published in 1998 as part of the anthology More Than Honor.

== Plot summary ==
In the early 37th century, the Harrington family moves from the planet Meyerdahl to the newly founded Star Kingdom of Manticore. Their eleven-year-old daughter, Stephanie, is unhappy with this change as their new home, the planet Sphinx, seems to have little to offer, especially with seasons lasting much longer than the Earth's. However, she changes her mind when the hunt for an unknown force that keeps stealing celery from the colonists' greenhouses leads her to an encounter with a new sentient species: a treecat, a six-limbed arboreal mammal going (unknown to Stephanie) by the name of Climbs Quickly. The two beings instantly share a psychic connection that future generations will come to call "bonding." This empathic/telepathic linking is involuntary and nearly instantaneous; like love at first sight. Climbs Quickly runs away back to his clan in the forest, which are revealed to be sentient beings that communicate through telepathy. Despite their sentience, they are still at the civilized level of hunter-gatherers, with no advanced machinery and only the early beginnings of agriculture. They are wary of revealing themselves to humans, which they realize are much more technologically advanced, but cannot be understood due to their lack of telepathic ability. Stephanie goes hang gliding several days later, unknown to her parents, as her way of scouting out the vast forest where she suspects Climbs Quickly lives. They sense each other and Climbs Quickly realizes that she is tracking him through their bond. He runs away from his clan's home in an attempt to prevent its discovery by humans. Stephanie crash-lands, caught by a storm, and Climbs Quickly realizes their bond compels him to protect her. They are approached by a hunting hexapuma, a six-legged puma native to the planet. Climbs Quickly calls for aid from his clan, which could overpower the hexapuma through sheer numbers, but he realizes that they will arrive too late. He fights the hexapuma and is stunned, and Stephanie rises to defend him despite her injuries. She buys enough time for the clan to arrive, and the clan literally rips the hexapuma to pieces. Her father arrives soon after, having tracked her wristband, and he takes both her and Climbs Quickly to heal and recover at their estate.

Two years later the bond between Climbs Quickly, named Lionheart by humans, and Stephanie has increased so they can understand their emotion and general meanings, despite a lack of clear language. Due to the discovery of the sentient animals, many scientists have arrived to study them, and they constantly pester Stephanie for information. Stephanie attends an event hosted by the mayor of her town in an effort to acclimatize her neighbors to her bond, but Trudy and several other immature children consider him a pet and almost anger Stephanie into a fight. Lionheart calms Stephanie, and they depart peacefully. It is revealed that only one other live human, Dr. Scott MacDallan, has bonded with a treecat, whom he addresses as Fisher. Stephanie and MacDallan arrange to meet, and they discuss the intrusion of scientists and public opinion regarding treecats. They agree to only disclose limited information to scientists, in fear that the treecats could be eradicated, much like previous sentient beings found by other humans on other planets. Stephanie is introduced to friends of MacDallan, and she begins creating a group of allies around her who understand and support treecats. Several days later Tennessee Bolgeo, an agent for Ustinov's Exotic Pets, Inc. arrives on the planet, looking to capture treecats in order to sell as exotic pets. He masquerades as a scientist researching treecats and looks into the range of their telepathic ability in order to decide how to best capture them alive. He develops small devices that sedate treecats once luring them in with celery, which treecats find amazingly delicious. He captures three and heads out to pick up a fourth caught in the forest. Meanwhile, in the forest, the trap is found and Climbs Quickly and Stephanie goes to investigate along with several clan members. They examine the trap, and Stephanie calls for help from Scott and his friends. Before they arrive, Bolgeo comes to collect the treecat and is apprehended by the treecats and Stephanie. He and his accomplices are imprisoned as punishment for poaching, and the book closes with Stephanie being accepted as a probationary ranger to guard the treecat population.

== Background ==
The short story "A Beautiful Friendship" was originally published in 1998, after Stephanie Harrington and her treecat Lionheart had already been mentioned in passing in the main series of novels.

The novel is split into two parts, the first of which, Unexpected Meetings, encompasses chapters 1 to 12 and is largely identical to the short story, adding only details like a number of dates. The second part, With Friends Like These..., tells an entirely new story taking place several months later.

== Reception ==
David Weber's first venture into young adult fiction was received with mixed reviews. Publishers Weekly considered the story to be one for fans rather than teenage readers. Liz Bourke, writing for Tor.com, felt the story disjointed and a pair of novellas and, compared to other examples of the genre, lacking a compelling adolescent voice.

=== Other reviews ===
- Review by Carolyn Cushman (2011) in Locus, #606 July 2011
- Review by Don Sakers (2011) in Analog Science Fiction and Fact, October 2011
- Review by Dan'l Danehy-Oakes (2011) in The New York Review of Science Fiction, December 2011
