= At All Costs (Weber novel) =

2005 science fiction novel by David Weber

- Author: David Weber
- Language: English
- Series: Honor Harrington series
- Genre: Military science fiction
- Publication date: 2005
- Publication place: United States
- Media type: Print (hardback & paperback)
- Pages: 864
- ISBN: 1-4165-0911-9
- OCLC: 61261222
- Dewey Decimal: 813/.54 22
- LC Class: PS3573.E217 A94 2005
- Preceded by: War of Honor
- Followed by: Mission of Honor

At All Costs is a science fiction novel by American author David Weber, first published in 2005. It is the eleventh book in the Honor Harrington series.

== Plot summary ==
Because the actions of the High Ridge government in War of Honor led to the Republic of Haven successfully attacking key Alliance shipyards, the Star Kingdom of Manticore finds itself disadvantaged in the ongoing war, with at least two years before any significant new construction may begin. Admiral Honor Harrington is placed in command of Eighth Fleet, the Manticoran Alliance's primary offensive force.

Strategically, the Eighth Fleet plans to instill enough operational caution and sensitivity to losses in Haven to force redeployments of starships in defensive postures, reducing Haven's offensive resources. To expedite this, they are assigned most of Manticore's cutting-edge war-fighting hardware, including the new "Apollo" self-guided missile system, which gives Manticoran missiles a massive range advantage over their Havenite counterparts, and "Keyhole" platforms that increase the efficacy of their own counter-missiles. Their first two raids frighten the Havenite populace somewhat, but on the third, at Solon, a defensive ambush led by Admiral Javier Giscard is waiting for them. Honor is sorely trounced, losing several ships and being forced to abandon a vessel captained by her best friend, Admiral Michelle "Mike" Henke, Countess Gold Peak; Henke is believed killed in action, but survives and is captured as a POW.

Honor continues to work closely with Hamish Alexander, now First Lord of the Admiralty, on the military and political challenges facing the Alliance, and they fall into the very romantic relationship the High Ridge government tried to insinuate during War of Honor. She and Hamish are married and conceive a son, Raoul, who is "tubed" while his mother goes into combat and is born before the end of the novel. Emily, assisted by Honor's mother Allison, a leading geneticist, also becomes a mother with Hamish.

Republic of Haven President Eloise Pritchart continues to work towards peacefully ending the war. She and her administration discover that Haven's Secretary of State Arnold Giancola sabotaged the peace talks. Unfortunately, both Arnold and his accomplice, Yves Grosclaude, are killed before questioning. This lack of proof prevents Pritchart from coming forward and accepting culpability for the current war, but she nonetheless sends Mike Henke back to Manticore with an offer for a peace conference.

Queen Elizabeth accepts, but several more cases of the nanotechnology are deployed in assassination attempts on other noteworthy Manticoran figures, including Queen Berry of Torch and her Head of Intelligence. This forces Elizabeth to resume the war, ordering the Eighth Fleet to attack the Lovat System. Honor does so and this time defeats Giscard's ambushers, resulting in his death and the destruction of most of his fleet.

Pritchart, with few options and devastated by her lover Giscard's death, realizes that Haven must conclude the war by force. She authorizes "Operation Beatrice," a direct strike at the Manticore System itself. The result is the largest space battle in recorded history, with Haven's Second and Fifth fleets pitted against the Manticoran Home, Third, and Eighth fleets.

During the battle, the Second fleet manages to totally destroy the Home Fleet with overwhelming numbers, suffering heavy losses in the process. Third Fleet redeploys into the Manticore system via a series of micro-jumps from the Manticore Wormhole Junction and engages Second Fleet, but is caught in a trap by the waiting Fifth Fleet; most of this force is destroyed engaging both Havenite fleets. Harrington then arrives with the Eighth Fleet in a mass transit. She obliterates the Fifth Fleet without any losses using Apollo missiles. Tourville surrenders the remainder of his Second Fleet. The entire battle lasts roughly an hour and renders both sides of the conflict incapable of further offensive action.

== Commentary ==
Most of the action takes place simultaneously with the events of The Shadow of Saganami. In addition to Manticore, Haven, and Grayson, front stage players (even those lurking in the wings of the stage) now include the Andermani, who have entered the Manticorian Alliance; the genetic slavers of Mesa, secretly striving to keep Manticore and Haven shooting at each other as long as possible; non-self absorbed elements of the Solarian League continuing the inexorable and glacier creep of League influence; and the inhabitants of the Talbot Cluster, clamoring for membership in the Star Kingdom after discovering the new Manticore Junction terminus in their region of space.

The book was released in hardcover in 2005 (with a CD-ROM containing free copies of other works written by Weber). Advance Reader Copies were made available for sale at baen.com some months previously, with a sizable portion of the book being "snippetted" on Baen's Bar for free.

== Analysis ==
David Weber has stated his original plan was to have Honor in charge of the third fleet during the final battle, and perish during the battle. Her son, then would have had his own series start as he came of age, at which point the Solarian League begins its breakup, and a long war begins.

Preceded by War of Honor	Honor Harrington books	Succeeded by Mission of Honor
