= Jiří Walker Procházka =

Czech writer

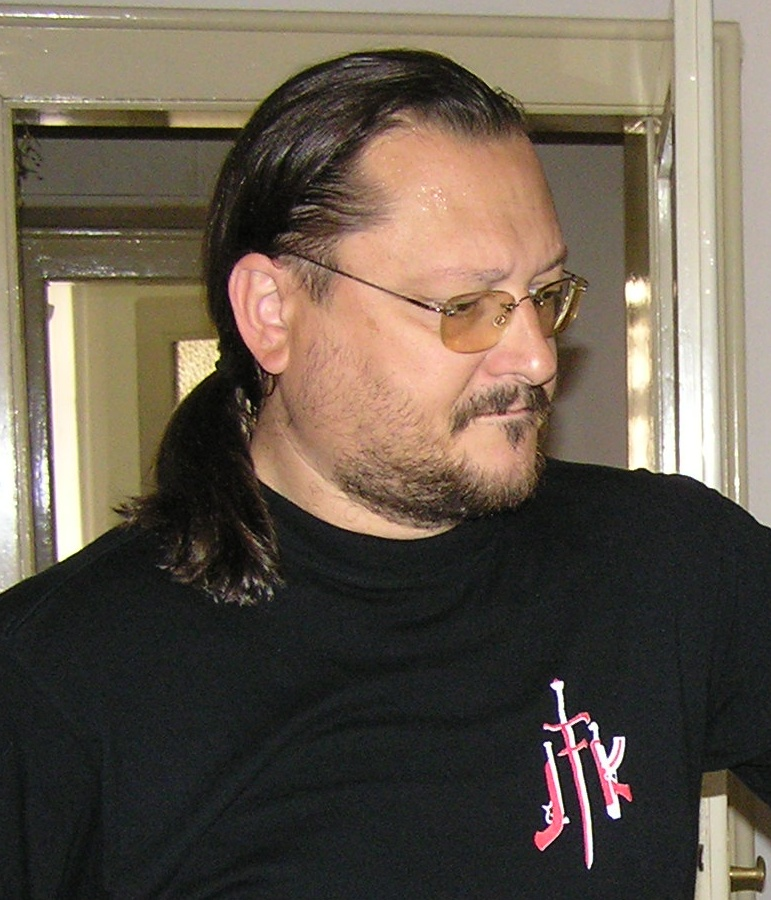
- Jiří Walker Procházka
- Born: 18 August 1959 (age 66); Kutná Hora, Czechoslovakia
- Other names: George P. Walker
- Occupation: Writer
- Known for: Science fiction, detective fiction

Jiří Walker Procházka (born 18 August 1959), also known by the pseudonym George P. Walker, is a Czech sci-fi and detective fiction author. In 1989, Procházka described himself as "the permanent political prisoner" because he had lived since his birth in communist Czechoslovakia.

== Career ==
His professional career started at the Research Institute for High Voltage Electronics (VÚSE) in Prague in 1982. He then worked for some time in a printers, during which time he wrote his first stories (around 1985). Afterwards, Procházka worked as an IT specialist, later becoming a writer and publisher. He was part of a wave of new authors that emerged from 1980 to 1990. His story Rox'n'Roll was written in 1988. Ondřej Jireš described Procházka as "a striking element in the Czech sci-fi waters" whose "highly imaginative stories became examples for a good many followers." According to Boris Hokr, Procházka was an author that opened the door to Czech sci-fi, alongside Ondřej Neff.

== Books ==
- Ken Wood a meč krále D'Sala (Ken Wood and the Sword of the King D'Sal), Ivo Železný, Prague 1991, first part of a fantasy series published under the name of George P. Walker. New edition 2008 published by Triton Prague.
- Tvůrci času (Creators of Time), Winston Smith, Prague 1991, sci-fi anthology.
- Ken Wood a perly královny Maub (Ken Wood and the Queen Maub's Pearls), Ivo Železný, Prague 1992, second part of a fantasy series published under the name of George P. Walker.
- Hvězdní honáci (Star Cowboys), Altar, Prague 1996, sci-fi novel, galactic space-opera, awarded by the SF, Fantasy and Horror Academy Award, ISBN 80-85979-07-1
- Jablka z Beltamoru (Apples from Beltamor), Ivo Železný, Prague 2002, 63rd part of the sci-fi serie Mark Stone.
- Totální ztráta rozměru (Total Loss of Dimension), Millenium Publishing, Prague 2003, sci-fi stories collection
- Agent JFK 1 - Pašerák (Bootlegger), Triton, Prague 2005, with Miroslav Žamboch,
- Agent JFK 2 - Není krve bez ohně (Where there's blood, there's fire), Triton, Prague 2005, with Miroslav Žamboch
- Agent JFK 3 - Meč a tomahawk (Sword and Tomahawk), Triton, Prague 2006, with Miroslav Žamboch,
- Agent JFK 4 - Armády nesmrtelných (Armies of Immortals), Triton, Prague 2006, with Miroslav Žamboch
- Agent JFK 11 - Podhoubí smrti (Breeding Ground Called Death), Triton, Prague 2007,
- Agent JFK 27 - Dlouhý černý úsvit (Long Black Dawn), Triton, Prague 2012,
- Druhý krok nikam (Second Step to Nowhere), Brokilon 2011, ISBN 978-80-7456-007-1 (free sequel to Total Loss of Dimension)
- Agent JFK 33 - Soumrak světů (Twilight of Worlds), Triton, Prague 2014, ISBN 978-80-7387-794-1, SF stories collection
- Mrtvá šelma - Souřadnice zločinu 1 (Dead Beast – Coordinates of Crime), Plus, Prague 2015, with Klára Smolíková, ISBN 978-80-259-0382-7
- Šest nevinných (Six Innocent), Pavel Mervart, Červený Kostelec 2015, ISBN 978-80-7465-161-8, with Josef Pecinovský, David Zábranský, Přemysl Krejčík, Jan Sviták, Lukáš Vavrečka
- Tajná dvojka A+B. Zločin mezi dinosaury Klára Smolíková; Jiří Walker Procházka; Viktor Svoboda, Fragment, Prague 2016

== Literary awards ==
- 1992 Ludvík Souček Award
- 1993 Certificate of Merit in the Karel Čapek literary contest
- 1997 Science-fiction, Fantasy and Horror Academy Award
- 1997 Ikaros Award
- 2002 Science-fiction, Fantasy and Horror Academy Award
- 2004 Science-fiction, Fantasy and Horror Academy Award
- 2015 Science-fiction, Fantasy and Horror Academy Award
- 2014 Grand Master of the SF genre
- 2015 Aeronautilus Award
