= Honorverse =

Fictional universe created by David Weber

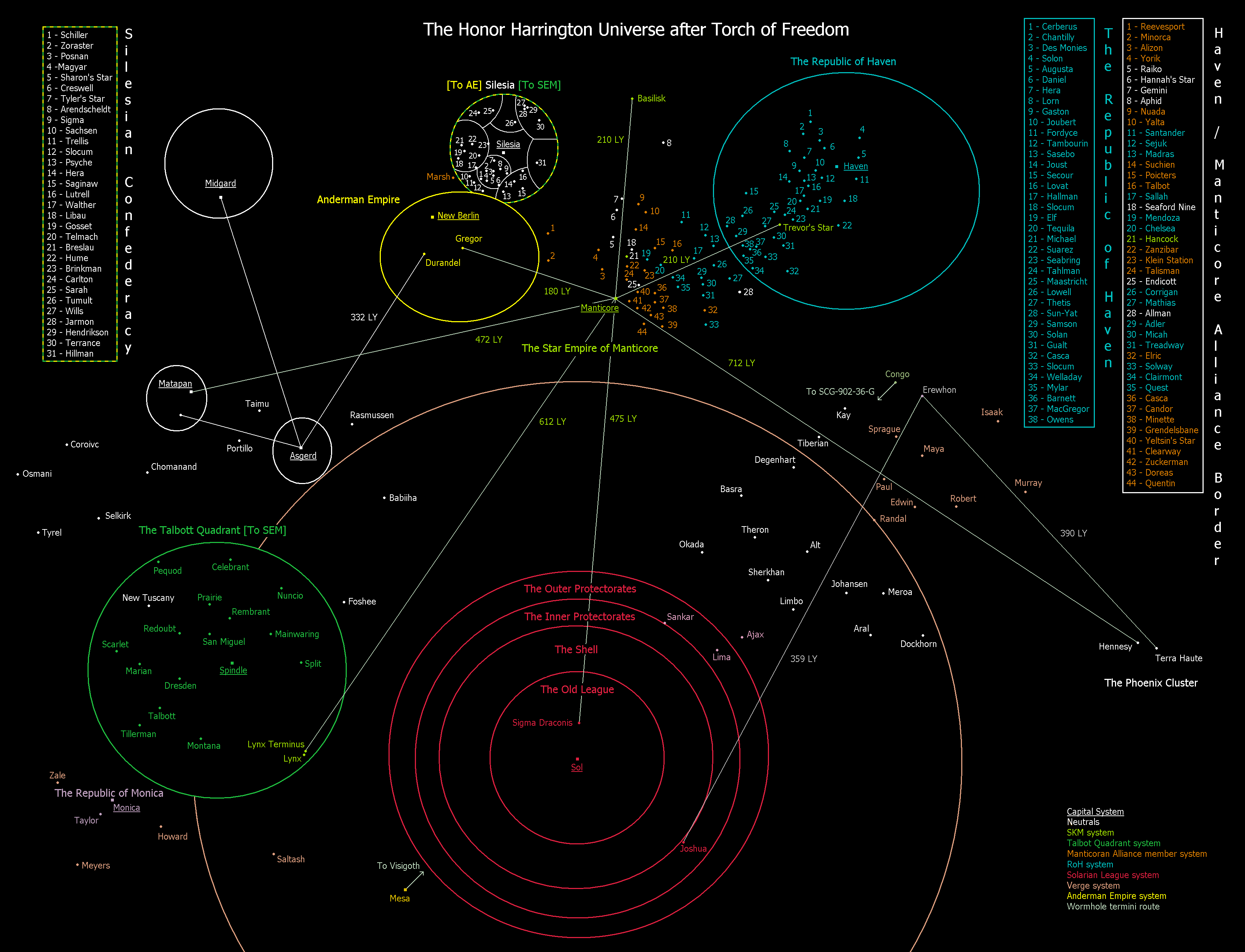
A fan-made map of the regions in which the "Honorverse" stories are set

The Honorverse is a military science fiction book series, its two subseries, two prequel series, and anthologies created by David Weber and published by Baen Books. They are centered on the space navy career of the principal protagonist Honor Harrington. The books have made The New York Times Best Seller list.

The series began with On Basilisk Station in 1993.

== Plot ==
The series follows Honor Harrington, military heroine and later, influential politician, during a time of extreme interstellar change and tension. Most of the more than 20 novels and anthology collections cover events between 4000 and 4022 AD with "PD" (Post-Diaspora) dating beginning with a dispersal to the stars from the Sun ("Sol") in 2103 AD. The main series novels are set primarily in a timeline beginning 40 years after Harrington's birth on October 1, 3962 AD (1859 PD), and some short stories flesh out her earlier career. Additional novels and shorter fiction take place up to 350 years earlier, and still-earlier canon history is filled in between narratives and in appendices attached to the main novels and anthologies.

The political makeup and history of the series frequently echoes actual history, particularly that of Europe in the last half of the second millennium. The series is consciously modeled on the Horatio Hornblower series by C. S. Forester, and its main character, like Horatio Hornblower, on a mix of Thomas Cochrane and Admiral Lord Nelson. Weber originally planned for Harrington to die in the fifth book. This was later changed to parallel Nelson by having her die at the peak of her career in the climactic Battle of Manticore in 1921 PD (4024 AD), then continue the series with her children as the main protagonists. However, collaborating author Eric Flint intervened, asking for the invention of a mutual enemy for both the Star Kingdom of Manticore and the Republic of Haven to oppose in a spy-and-counterspy spin-off sub-series the two contractually agreed to co-write, just as they have contracts to write in Flint's 1632 universe. This "rethink" and redesign caused Weber to move the series' internal chronology up by about 20 years and begat the Crown of Slaves novel, first in the "Crown of Slaves" sub-series based on a number of the short stories of the first four collections. In this scenario, proxies for Manticore and Haven oppose the same hidden enemy, the genetic slavers and powers behind the government and corporations of the planet of Mesa. Mesa is later revealed in Mission of Honor to be part of a secret cabal of about a dozen highly capable planets that are busily building a secret navy using advanced technologies at a secret planet and known to itself as the Mesan Alignment. The Mesan Alignment's navy has new technology and conducts a sneak attack on Manticore in 1922 PD during the twelfth mainline novel, Mission of Honor. The Mesans have a 600-year-old secret program to reinstitute purposeful genetic engineering of humans and break up the Solarian League, while taking down all opponents opposing such genetic engineering. This makes the staunchly anti-genetic-slavery star nations of Haven, Manticore, and various associates of the planet Beowulf primary targets of the Mesan Alignment. The "Crown of Slaves" sub-series books and last two mainline Honorverse novels detail the rising extent of this threat.

As the two sub-series progress, albeit with somewhat-separate casts of characters, each is expected by Weber to carry the detailed storyline events particular to their astrographical region forward and tie together into an ongoing plotline concerning the massive and monolithic Solarian League, which foreshadowing in the most recent novels suggests is about to undergo severe disruption. The thirteenth mainline novel, A Rising Thunder, ties together events in both sub-series and synchronizes the timeline of each sub-series with Honor Harrington's mainline novels. This book confirms the Solarian League is officially now the new Mesan cat's paw, effectively at war with both the Star Empire of Manticore and the Republic of Haven, as it has been manipulated into error after error by the operatives of the Mesan Alignment.

== Setting ==
Among a handful of anthologies, the thirteen Honor-centered novels, and two subordinate sub-series starring some different characters, the universe first explored in On Basilisk Station has a diasporal historical background for the backstory storyline, in which mankind, over almost two millennia, migrated to systems beyond the Sol system, first in slower-than-light starships, then by increasingly efficient and effective hyperspace drive-propulsion systems. Early daughter colonies also spawned colonies, forming regional networks of related populations. With travel limited to slower-than-light speeds, any marginally habitable nearby planet was of interest, and Earth's scientists went through a period in which they regularly genetically modified the human genome for survival positive adaptations to marginal environments, such as heavy gravity, thin atmosphere, thick atmospheres, or toxic environments (e.g. Grayson). Some corporate entities also began breeding for super soldiers and superior intellects, good looks, sexual prowess, etc., or mixes of such traits, practices that led to a horrific "Final War" on Old Earth. Long-established and advanced daughter colonies like Beowulf mounted a variety of rescue missions and initiated a thousand-year effort to clean up the Earth gene pool. For a time, the cultural centre moved off the Earth as it took about 500 years for the planetary economy to recover its pre-eminence within its shell of highly populated, highly developed planets. Located in the center of the spherical Solarian League, Earth's Old Chicago eventually re-emerged as the nominal League Capital.

By the Gregorian calendar currently in use, the Honorverse novels are dated beginning with year 2103 A.D.—the epoch date of the Diaspora's beginning.

The FTL hyperspace propulsion system in the stories is around 600 years old at the time period in which the novels are placed. This technology uses the ability to "sail" along a vast network of "gravity waves" on different successively higher hyperbands, each higher band giving a more-efficient speed multiplier but requiring more powerful (therefore bulkier and more expensive) engines to reach; the higher bands significantly shortening transit times on a given gravity wave for a given base speed, which is limited by particle densities and radiation shielding as Newtonian speeds increase. Analogous to prevailing trade winds creating certain favoured sea routes on Earth, the relatively static fixed gravity waves form favoured travel paths. A lack of gravity waves in some regions means that they must be plodded across by relatively slower means. These favorite routes and desert crossing points are susceptible to illegitimate exploitation by pirates and commerce-raiding warships, both interested in preying on the rich pickings of the interstellar merchant cargo ships that carry upwards of 2–7 million metric tonnes of cargo.

Within each hyperband, ships have a local speed limited by particle densities that, at high relative speeds, become cosmic radiation. Better physical shielding or a better particle shield generator enables faster speeds within the band, on which base speed, multiplied by that band's multiplier, results in shorter journey times. Merchant ships have immense size and thin walls with virtually no physical shielding, as well as cheaper, relatively weak particle shield generators and hyper generators. Commercial carriers, like sailing ships and freight trains of Old Earth, trade off journey time by increased size and volume carried, so as to keep shipping costs economical. Military vessels, having no profit motive and already physically shielded, also carry better particle shield generators and can attain much faster interstellar voyage times both within a band, and because their better protections enables them to enter higher hyperbands with higher local particle counts, but higher speed multipliers.

The interaction of gravity effects also manifest in much rarer, generally widely scattered wormholes, through which hyperdrive equipped ships can travel virtually instantaneously between the wormhole's end points. In some systems, several of these wormholes are found to be co-located forming an irresistible trading nexus, perhaps because their ends have some mathematical affinity: they occur with entrances relatively close together in very small spatial volumes.

The greatest known aggregation of these co-located "Junctions" or Terminus Loci occurs in the Manticore binary star system, whose wormholes connect the wormhole junction to six (later seven) other star systems, giving the Manticore system an astrographic position to be coveted, and an immense revenue stream from transit tolls, manufacturing and trade, and a large carrying trade.

In the stories, no means of faster-than-light interstellar communications exists. Messages between star systems must be physically carried by starships. Even using the fastest ships available as couriers, this communications "lag" between worlds has many consequences, greatly increasing the responsibility placed upon starship captains and senior military commanders far from home, complicating the coordination of military campaigns, and allowing a single accident or attack to render a planet incommunicado.

The stories include numerous dependent and independent polities and several major star nations including two giant aggregations of many planets, Haven and the Solarian League. Protagonist Honor Harrington is a citizen of the Star Kingdom of Manticore which is, during the first 20 or so works of the series, the key rival and the main stellar protagonist against the star-conquering (People's) Republic of Haven; these two nations are consciously based on Imperial Britain and Napoleonic France, although Haven also seems to be influenced by the former Soviet Union. The first books deal with a universe of escalating tensions and military incidents until war breaks out in the third novel and lasts until the formal peace in A Rising Thunder, the thirteenth mainline novel. Each star nation suffers horrendous losses at the end of the eleventh novel, At All Costs, during the Battle of Manticore, when Haven makes an all-out bid to conquer the Star Kingdom before general deployment of a feared 'super weapon'. In the anthologies, Eric Flint and Weber wrote stories that birthed the first sub-series, resulting in the novels Crown of Slaves and Torch of Freedom. The sub-series introduced some far-more dangerous adversaries, the interstellar corporations of Mesa: Manpower Unlimited, Jessyk Combine, and others. This group was then revealed to be part of the even more dangerous and hidden secret adversaries of the shadowy Mesan Alignment. The Alignment included corrupted leaders of Solarian Core worlds promoting the destruction of the old order. Mesan puppet masters are revealed to be pulling the strings of corrupt Solarian League bureaucrats and admirals in both the sub-series and the main series. Enormously ambitious, the Alignment plans the overthrow of the Solarian League, and the complete destruction of the Star Kingdom of Manticore, Haven, Beowulf, and all of those polities' historic allies.

Disruptive technological advances have been few in the Honorverse for most of the 500 years leading up to the series; as the series opens, that technological stagnation has led to a similar stagnation in both military strategy and tactics. During the course of the book series, both forms of stagnation (technological and military) are brought to a violent end by developments stemming from the Havenite/Manticoran Wars, which give both Haven and Manticore a substantial technological advantage over the Solarian League by the time of the most recently published books of the series.

== Concept and creation ==
David Weber didn't set out to create a female protagonist; "it was the way the character came to me," Weber explains. "I didn't set out to do it because I thought that it was especially politically sensitive on my part or because I thought it was likely to strike a chord with female readership or be a financial success. It was just the way that the character first presented herself." Weber doesn't find writing a female character particularly challenging, because, he says, "I'm writing about a human being who happens to be female." When he first started writing, he had developed her entire back story before he started the first book. However, since he knew from the beginning that these books would become a series, he deliberately set Honor up as a character who changes and grows. One example Weber offers is that in The Short Victorious War, Honor off-handedly refers to her genetically enhanced metabolism, which isn't fully explored until In Enemy Hands: "It was one of those little things that I knew about or that I was holding in reserve," Weber says.

The first name of his character—Honor—had come to Weber long before the last name did. Weber knew that if the Honor novels worked, she was inevitably going to be compared to C. S. Forester's Horatio Hornblower, so he saw to it that she had the same initials. He said, "There are certainly, clearly, similarities between the two. There are also huge differences. And Honor has never been as neurotic as Hornblower was. Hornblower always carried a massive sense of inferiority around with him. Honor never did." Weber also feels that in the later books in the series, she has more in common with Admiral Horatio Nelson than Hornblower. Weber revealed in the foreword to Storm from the Shadows that it had originally been his intent to kill her off in the Battle of Manticore, thus further echoing Nelson's death (in his greatest battle, Trafalgar) and have the emerging Mesa problem be dealt with by the next generation, specifically her children. When writing At All Costs, he decided instead to keep her alive, and move the Mesan-related events up, to be her problem.

== Publication ==
Many of Weber's books are available at the Baen Free Library; chapters of some texts are otherwise available online. The first-edition hardcover releases of War of Honor, At All Costs, Torch of Freedom, and Mission of Honor contained a CD with copies of most of Weber's published books at the time, labeled for free redistribution.

=== Honor Harrington series ===
1. On Basilisk Station (April 1992) ISBN 0-671-57793-X / HH1
2. The Honor of the Queen (June 1993) ISBN 0-671-57864-2 / HH2
3. The Short Victorious War (April 1994) ISBN 0-671-87596-5 / HH3
4. Field of Dishonor (December 1994) ISBN 0-671-57820-0 / HH4
5. Flag in Exile (September 1995) ISBN 0-671-31980-9 / HH5
6. Honor Among Enemies (February 1996) ISBN 0-671-87723-2 / HH6
7. In Enemy Hands (July 1997) ISBN 0-671-57770-0 / HH7
8. Echoes of Honor (October 1998) ISBN 0-671-57833-2 / HH8
9. Ashes of Victory (March 2000) ISBN 0-671-57854-5 / HH9
10. War of Honor (October 2002) ISBN 0-7434-3545-1 / HH10
11. At All Costs (November 2005) ISBN 1-4165-0911-9 / HH11
12. Mission of Honor (June 2010) ISBN 1-4391-3361-1 / HH12
13. A Rising Thunder (March 2012) ISBN 1-4767-3612-X / HH13
14. Uncompromising Honor (October 2018) ISBN 9781481483506 / HH14

The Honor Harrington series has been produced several times in audiobook format, at first in cassette (90 min) format by Library of Congress, narrated by Madelyn Buzzard (books 1–10), later by Audible Frontiers beginning in 2009, narrated by Allyson Johnson.

=== Spin-offs ===
The Honorverse is a tightly plotted, highly organized invention that was designed with a specific overarching storyline. Its storyline has shifted from the original plan to include new enemies, and did not result in the battle death of heroine Honor Harrington, as was planned originally for book five, and then later for book eleven. The series' canon is maintained solely by its creator, who acts as editor of the works in the universe by other collaborating authors.

Like some of the strategy employed by co-author Eric Flint in his 1632 series, the series has, starting with War of Honor, begun incorporating a broader viewpoint from more than one central character, many of whom, like in the 1632 series, appeared in other series works as supporting characters. Stories in the Worlds of Honor collections directly lead to events and character stars of the Crown of Slaves (CoS) sub-series, whereas the Shadow of Saganami's star cast and some of the characters of the CoS derive directly from the mainline novels. Both contain purposely invented new protagonist characters as well. Weber deliberately has synchronized events in the mainline series with the tellings of local knowledge and vice versa in both sub-series. In other words, the broad front on which he is now telling the overall story is geographically distinct, but synchronized in his timeline: events in one quadrant will affect life and events in the related narratives centred on other main characters.

Short fiction in the series serves as deep backstory or, like the short stories centred directly on Honor Harrington, exposes episodes of her earlier career in much the same way C. S. Forester revealed the not-yet-in-command life of the young Horatio Hornblower. Some of the more important of these tales reveal a greater knowledge of Sphinx's native species, letting the reader in on knowledge not known even to the Honorverse occupants. Among these tales are the revealed history of how treecats and humans first bonded, how the treecats protected and bonded with the royal family, and other treecat tales of greater or lesser importance, such as how the treecat society decided to migrate to the stars. Other short stories expose points of view and life problems from places around the larger universe. Some offer insights to life behind enemy lines in the view of its citizens and their experience, or that of a protagonist in the Verge, or in the Solarian League.

==== Worlds of Honor anthologies ====
Stories and essays by David Weber, along with other writers invited by him to participate. The stories may either precede or be concurrent with the main Honor Harrington series.

1. More Than Honor (January 1998) ISBN 0-671-87857-3 / HHA1—three stories by authors David Weber, David Drake, and S. M. Stirling plus a Honorverse background history, and including the story in which treecats and some of their characteristics first come to human knowledge.
2. Worlds of Honor (February 1999) ISBN 0-671-57855-3 / HHA2—five stories by authors David Weber (two stories), Linda Evans, Jane Lindskold and Roland J. Green.
3. Changer of Worlds (March 2001) ISBN 0-671-31975-2 / HHA3—four stories by authors David Weber (three stories) and Eric Flint. The short novel Ms. Midshipwoman Harrington is built around the Honorverse's eponymous character.
4. The Service of the Sword (April 2003) ISBN 0-7434-3599-0 / HHA4—six stories by authors David Weber, Jane Lindskold, Timothy Zahn, John Ringo, and Eric Flint; one by John Ringo and Victor Mitchell jointly. Originally to have been titled In Fire Forged—a title that was re-used for a different book in 2011.
5. In Fire Forged (February 2011) ISBN 978-1-4391-3414-6 / HHA5
6. Beginnings (July 2013) ISBN 978-1451639032 / HHA6
7. What Price Victory? (February 2023) ISBN 978-1982192419 / HHA7—stories by Timothy Zahn & Thomas Pope, Jane Lindskold, Jan Kotouč, Joelle Presby and David Weber
8. Challenges: Tales from the Earliest Days of the Star Kingdom (November 2025)

==== Crown of Slaves series ====
The story of agents Anton Zilwicki (Manticore) and Victor Cachat (Haven) and their strange alliance to uncover the dark power that manipulated their two nations into war, and put an end to the true enemy's plans. This series is concurrent with the main Honor Harrington series.

1. From the Highlands (short novel in Changer of Worlds) by Eric Flint—introduces the main characters of the series.
2. Fanatic (novella in The Service of the Sword) by Eric Flint—furthers the character of Victor Cachat.
3. Crown of Slaves (September 2003) ISBN 0-7434-7148-2 / CS1; with Eric Flint—the two character groups introduced in From the Highlands re-encounter each other at a state funeral in Erewhon. High-level international politics and spy-craft ensue.
4. Torch of Freedom (November 2009) ISBN 1-4391-3305-0 / CS2; with Eric Flint—Victor Cachat and Anton Zilwicki, the universe's two top spies, work together to undertake a dangerous mission to the heart of Mesa, home of the evil corporation Manpower Unlimited, to gather information that may end the second war between their respective governments, Haven and Manticore.
5. Cauldron of Ghosts (eBook March 15, 2014, hardcover April 8, 2014) ISBN 9781476736334 / CS3; with Eric Flint—Zilwicki and Cachat return to Mesa—only to discover that even they have underestimated the Alignment's ruthlessness and savagery.
6. To End in Fire (October 5, 2021) ISBN 1982125640 / CS4; with Eric Flint—Agents of the Grand Alliance join forces with Solarians to uncover the vast interstellar conspiracy operating against them.

==== Shadow series ====
The story of Admiral Michelle Henke and several graduates of Saganami Island when the Star Kingdom annexes the Talbott Cluster to become the Star Empire. (Also referred to as the Saganami Island series.) This series is concurrent with the main Honor Harrington series.

1. The Shadow of Saganami (October 2004) ISBN 0-7434-8852-0 / SI1: The novel is primarily set in the remote Talbott Cluster, connected to Manticore via a newly discovered junction terminus, and includes characters already introduced in other works, such as Helen Zilwicki and Abigail Hearns, as well as brief appearances by many others.
2. Storm from the Shadows (March 2009) ISBN 978-1416591474 / SI2: The novel continues the events in the Talbott Cluster (now Quadrant), and centers around Honor Harrington's best friend Admiral Michelle Henke and characters from the original book of the series. The events of the book include the results of Talbott government's signing its constitution and becoming part of the Star Empire of Manticore. The shadow conflict between Mesa and Manticore heats up as more Mesa-orchestrated incidents accrue to bring about war between Manticore and the Solarian League.
3. Shadow of Freedom (March 2013) ISBN 1-4516-3869-8, ISBN 978-1-4516-3869-1 / SI3: The novel continues the events in the Talbott Quadrant as the conflict with the Solarian League turns to outright war. Attacks on Manticoran shipping by Frontier Security and continued manipulation by the Mesan Alignment spur Admiral Henke to first react, then adopt a policy of offensive (versus defensive) operations. This culminates in Manticore's first offensive victory of the war, the previous Manticoran victories having been defensive in nature.
4. Shadow of Victory (November 1, 2016) ISBN 978-1-4767-8182-2 / SI4: The novel continues events in the Talbott Quadrant as the war with the Solarian League heats up, more local star systems rebel against the Solarian League's domination, and the Mesan Alignment becomes increasingly active behind the scenes. Concludes with Michelle Henke's invasion of the Mesa system in an attempt to get to the bottom of the growing pile of circumstantial evidence about the Alignment's activities.

==== The Star Kingdom series ====
This series features Stephanie Harrington, Honor Harrington's distant ancestor, and the first human to be adopted by a treecat. This series precedes the main Honor Harrington series.

1. A Beautiful Friendship (October 2011) ISBN 1-4516-3747-0 / SK1
2. Fire Season (October 15, 2012) by David Weber and Jane Lindskold ISBN 978-1-4516-3840-0 / SK2
3. Treecat Wars (October 1, 2013) by David Weber and Jane Lindskold ISBN 978-1-4516-3933-9 / SK3
4. A New Clan (June 7, 2022) by David Weber and Jane Lindskold ISBN 9781982191894 / SK4
5. Friends Indeed (March 4, 2025) by David Weber and Jane Lindskold ISBN 978-1-6680-7245-5 / SK5

==== Manticore Ascendant series ====
This series, which begins eleven years after the first book in The Star Kingdom series, features Travis Uriah Long, an enlisted Navy man and later an officer, and is centered on the small Manticoran Navy of that time. This series precedes the main Honor Harrington series.

1. A Call to Duty (September 15, 2014) by David Weber and Timothy Zahn. ISBN 978-1-4767-3684-6 / MA1
2. A Call to Arms (October 6, 2015) by David Weber and Timothy Zahn with Thomas Pope. ISBN 978-1-4767-8085-6 / MA2 It is expanded from the short story of the same name originally published in the Beginnings anthology.
3. A Call to Vengeance (March 7, 2018) by David Weber and Timothy Zahn with Thomas Pope. ISBN 978-1-4767-8210-2 / MA3
4. A Call to Insurrection (February 1, 2022) by David Weber and Timothy Zahn with Thomas Pope. ISBN 978-1982125899 / MA4
5. A Call to Deception (estimated release date February 2, 2027) by David Weber and Timothy Zahn with Thomas Pope. ISBN 978-1668073315 / MA5

A Call to Insurrection won the 2022 Dragon Awards in the Best Military Science Fiction or Fantasy Novel category.

==== Expanded Honor series ====
This series only has one published novel as of 2024, but based on publisher Simon and Schuster's marketing, is likely to contain standalone stories featuring minor characters from the mainstream novels.

1. Toll of Honor (April 2024) ISBN 978-1982193317

==== Companion ====
In 2013, Baen published House of Steel: The Honorverse Companion (May 7, 2013). The book is divided into two sections: a new novella written by Weber titled I Will Build My House of Steel and The Honorverse Companion, a collection of information about the Honorverse setting compiled by a fan group. The novella follows Roger Winton, a naval lieutenant who later becomes king. A reviewer for Analog Science Fiction and Fact wrote "I can't imagine a fan of the Honorverse who wouldn't want this book".

=== Ad Astra databooks ===
- Honor Harrington: Saganami Island Tactical Simulator (2005) ISBN 0-9748797-4-6

Saganami Island Tactical Simulator fleet boxes

1. Honor Harrington: Saganami Island Tactical Simulator: Manticoran Fleet Box 1 (2006) ISBN 0-9748797-5-4
2. Honor Harrington: Saganami Island Tactical Simulator: Havenite Fleet Box 1 (2006) ISBN 0-9748797-6-2
3. Honor Harrington: Saganami Island Tactical Simulator: Andermani Fleet Box 1 (2006) ISBN 1-934153-02-8
4. Honor Harrington: Saganami Island Tactical Simulator: Silesian Fleet Box 1 (2006) ISBN 1-934153-05-2
5. Honor Harrington: Saganami Island Tactical Simulator: Havenite Fleet Box 2 (2010)

Ship books

1. Honor Harrington: Saganami Island Tactical Simulator: Shipbook 2: Silesian Confederacy (2006) ISBN 0-9748797-7-0
2. Honor Harrington: Saganami Island Tactical Simulator: Shipbook 3: The Short Victorious War (2010)

Jayne's Intelligence Review

1. Jayne's Intelligence Review: The Royal Manticoran Navy (2006) ISBN 1-934153-08-7
2. Jayne's Intelligence Review: The People's Republican Navy (2007) ISBN 1-934153-09-5

Ships of the Fleet

1. Honor Harrington: Ships of the Fleet: 2006 (2005) ISBN 0-9748797-2-X
2. Honor Harrington: Ships of the Fleet: 2007 (2006) ISBN 0-9748797-9-7

=== Appearances in anthologies and collections ===
==== Anthologies ====
- The Warmasters (May 2002) ISBN 0-7434-3534-6: An anthology, containing the Honorverse short novel Ms. Midshipwoman Harrington. The story has previously appeared in a Worlds of Honor collection.
- Letter from Stephanie (2011) (Baen.com) Baen Free Stories 2011 By David Weber
- Grayson Navy Letters Home (2012) (Baen.com) Baen Free Stories 2012 By Joelle Presby
- Infinite Stars (October 2017) ISBN 9781785654596: A Bryan Thomas Schmidt anthology that contains the previously unpublished Honorverse short story "Our Sacred Honor".
- Dark Fall (2018) (Baen.com) Baen Free Stories 2018 By David Weber
- Noir Fatale (May 2019) ISBN 9781481483971: An anthology edited by Larry Correia and Kacey Ezell that contains the previously unpublished Honorverse short story "Recruiting Exercise".
- Give Me Libertycon (June 2020) ISBN 9781982124649: An anthology edited by Christopher Woods and T.K.F. Weisskopf that contains the previously unpublished Honorverse short story "Heart of Stone". The story is expanded on in the Star Kingdom series novel A New Clan.
- Onward Libertycon (June 2022) ISBN 9781946419460: An anthology edited by Christopher Woods and T.K.F. Weisskopf that contains the previously unpublished Honorverse short story "A Travesty of Nature". The story is expanded in Toll of Honor.
- Requiem: An Honor Harrington Story (2023) (Baen.com) Baen Free Stories 2023 By David Carrico

==== Collections ====
- Worlds of Weber (September 2008) ISBN 978-1-4391-3314-9/ISBN 1-4391-3314-X: A David Weber collection that includes nine short stories, set both in and out of the Honorverse. The two Honorverse stories have previously appeared in Worlds of Honor collections.
- Worlds (February 2009) ISBN 1-4165-9142-7: An Eric Flint collection containing the Honorverse short novel From the Highlands. The story has previously appeared in a Worlds of Honor collection.

=== In other media ===
In 2006, an Honor Harrington movie was announced by Echo Valley Entertainment. However, later information suggested that it would actually be a television series, to be written and produced by Peter Sands. When David Weber was asked which actress he envisioned as Honor Harrington, he replied, "I don't think there's anyone out there who has the proper combination of height, physicality, and demonstrated acting ability to be 'perfect' for the role, so my mind is fairly open on this topic." Actress Claudia Christian, who plays Susan Ivanova on Babylon 5, has been suggested as a potential candidate; Weber says "She's much shorter than Honor, but so are most women, and I think she could handle the physicality... I think it's more important to have someone who can portray Honor's character and command style than it is to have someone who is six feet two inches tall." Weber's concern is that the director would push Christian to re-create Ivanova's character while playing Honor and "Ivanova's command style is totally different from Honor's."

An Honor Harrington wargame, Saganami Island Tactical Simulator (SITS), was released at Gen Con in 2005 by Ad Astra Games.

An Honor Harrington video game called Honorverse: The Online Game was announced in August 2008; a beta was scheduled to be released in the Spring of 2010.

In 2014 Evergreen Studios announced plans to make a multi-platform adaptation of the Honor Harrington character, under the title Tales of Honor. A mobile game called Tales of Honor: The Secret Fleet was released that year for Android and iOS platforms. Tentative plans at that point also included a television series and a feature film. Evergreen Studios shut down in 2015, which led to the cancelation of most of their projects, including the mobile game, which is no longer available.

Also, in 2014, a five-issue comic book miniseries Tales of Honor: On Basilisk Station from Top Cow Productions, adapting the novel, began on March 5, 2014, concluding later that year. In 2015, Top Cow also released Tales of Honor: Bred to Kill, an original story.

== Stories listed by internal chronology ==
Honorverse year (from)	Honorverse year (to)	Story title	Author	Published	Code
250 P.D. (2352 C.E.)	250 P.D.	"By the Book"	Charles E. Gannon	July 2, 2013 (in Beginnings)	HHA6
552 P.D. (March)	1916 P.D. (March)	"Dark Fall"	David Weber	September 14, 2018 (on Baen website, also in Baen Free Stories 2018)	—
1512 P.D.	1512 P.D.	"Traitor"	Timothy Zahn & Thomas Pope	February 7, 2023 (in What Price Victory?)	HHA7
1518 P.D.	1519 P.D.	"A Beautiful Friendship"	David Weber	January 1, 1998 (in More than Honor—also forms first section of the novel A Beautiful Friendship)	HHA1
1518 P.D.	1521 P.D.	A Beautiful Friendship (novel)	David Weber	October 2011 (young adult novel)	SK1
1519 P.D. (January)	1519 P.D. (January)	“Letter from Stephanie”	David Weber	2011, Baen Free Stories	—
1520 P.D.	1520 P.D.	"The Stray"	Linda Evans	February 1999 (in Worlds of Honor)	HHA2
1522 P.D.	1522 P.D.	Fire Season	David Weber & Jane Lindskold	October 2012 (young adult novel)	SK2
1522 P.D.	1522 P.D.	Treecat Wars	David Weber & Jane Lindskold	October 2013 (young adult novel)	SK3
1522 P.D.	1522 P.D.	"Heart of Stone"	David Weber	June 2020 (in Give Me Libertycon—also forms first chapter of A New Clan)	—
1522 P.D.	1522 P.D.	A New Clan	David Weber & Jane Lindskold	June 7, 2022 (young adult novel)	SK4
1523 P.D.	1523 P.D.	"Deception on Gryphon"	Jane Lindskold	February 7, 2023 (in What Price Victory?)	HHA7
1523 P.D.	1524 P.D.	Friends Indeed	David Weber & Jane Lindskold	March 4, 2025 (young adult novel)	SK5
1529 P.D.	1533 P.D.	A Call to Duty	David Weber & Timothy Zahn	September 15, 2014	MA1
1539 P.D.	1543 P.D.	A Call to Arms (novel)	David Weber & Timothy Zahn with Thomas Pope	September 15, 2015	MA2
1543 P.D.	1543 P.D.	"A Call to Arms"	Timothy Zahn	July 2, 2013 (in Beginnings)	HHA6
1543 P.D. (end)	1544 P.D. (December)	A Call to Vengeance	David Weber & Timothy Zahn with Thomas Pope	March 7, 2018	MA3
1542 P.D. (Prologue)	1546 P.D. (end)	A Call to Insurrection	David Weber & Timothy Zahn with Thomas Pope	February 1, 2022	MA4
c. 1652 P.D.	c. 1652 P.D.	"What Price Dreams?"	David Weber	February 1999 (in Worlds of Honor)	HHA2
1842 P.D.	1842 P.D.	"Beauty and the Beast"	David Weber	July 2, 2013 (in Beginnings)	HHA6
c. 1844 P.D. (December)	c. 1914 P.D. (December)	"I Will Build a House of Steel"	David Weber	May 7, 2013 (in House of Steel: The Honorverse Companion)	—
March 1846 P.D.	December 1877 P.D.	"First Victory"	David Weber	February 7, 2023 (in What Price Victory?)	HHA7
c. 1870 P.D.	c. 1870 P.D.	"Our Sacred Honor"	David Weber	October 17, 2017 (in Infinite Stars anthology)	—
1872 P.D.	1872 P.D.	"The Best Laid Plans"	David Weber	July 2, 2013 (in Beginnings)	HHA6
1873 P.D.	1873 P.D.	"Recruiting Exercise"	David Weber	May 7, 2019 (In Noir Fatale)	—
c. 1880 P.D.	c. 1880 P.D.	"Ms. Midshipwoman Harrington"	David Weber	February 27, 2001 (in Changer of Worlds)	HHA3
c. 1883 P.D.	c. 1883 P.D.	"Queen's Gambit"	Jane Lindskold	February 1999 (in Worlds of Honor)	HHA2
c. 1890 P.D.	c. 1890 P.D.	"The Hard Way Home"	David Weber	February 1999 (in Worlds of Honor)	HHA2
c. 1892 P.D.	c. 1892 P.D.	"Promised Land"	Jane Lindskold	March 25, 2003 (in The Service of the Sword)	HHA4
c. 1895 P.D.	c. 1895 P.D.	"Ruthless"	Jane Lindskold	2011 (in In Fire Forged)	HHA5
c. 1899 P.D.	c. 1899 P.D.	"Let's Dance"	David Weber	2011 (in In Fire Forged)	HHA5
c. 1900 P.D. (March 3)	c. 1901 P.D. (January)	On Basilisk Station	David Weber	April 1992	HH1
1902 P.D.	1902 P.D.	"With One Stone"	Timothy Zahn	March 25, 2003 (in The Service of the Sword)	HHA4
c. 1903 P.D. (April)	c. 1903 P.D. (May)	The Honor of the Queen	David Weber	June 1993	HH2
?	?	"A Grand Tour"	David Drake	January 1, 1998 (in More than Honor)	HHA1
c. 1904 P.D.	c. 1905 P.D. (May)	The Short Victorious War	David Weber	April 1994	HH3
c. 1905 P.D. (June)	c. 1906 P.D.	Field of Dishonor	David Weber	December 1994	HH4
c. 1905 P.D. (March)	c. 1907 P.D. (August)	Toll of Honor	David Weber	April 2024	
1906 P.D. (c. September)	1906 P.D.	"Deck Load Strike"	Roland J. Green	February 1999 (in Worlds of Honor)	HHA2
c. 1907 P.D.	c. 1907 P.D. (August)	Flag in Exile	David Weber	September 1995	HH5
Spring 1907 P.D.	Spring 1907 P.D.	"A Ship Named Francis"	John Ringo & Victor Mitchell	March 25, 2003 (in The Service of the Sword)	HHA4
1907 P.D.	1907 P.D.	"Requiem"	David Carrico	2023, Baen Free Stories	—
c. 1908 P.D. (September)	c. 1910 P.D. (March)	Honor Among Enemies	David Weber	February 1996	HH6
c. 1910 P.D.	c. 1910 P.D.	"Changer of Worlds"	David Weber	February 27, 2001 (in Changer of Worlds)	HHA3
c. 1911 P.D. (July)	c. 1911 P.D. (July)	"A Whiff of Grapeshot"	S. M. Stirling	January 1, 1998 (in More than Honor)	HHA1
c. 1911 P.D.	c. 1911 P.D. (December)	In Enemy Hands	David Weber	July 1997	HH7
c. 1912 P.D. (February)	c. 1913 P.D. (December)	Echoes of Honor	David Weber	October 1998	HH8
1913 P.D.	1913 P.D.	"Let's Go to Prague" {between ch. 2 & 3 of Ashes of Victory}	John Ringo	March 25, 2003 (in The Service of the Sword)	HHA4
c. 1913 P.D. (December)	c. 1915 P.D. (May)	Ashes of Victory	David Weber	March 1, 2000	HH9
c. 1914 P.D.	c. 1914 P.D.	"An Act of War"	Timothy Zahn	2011 (in In Fire Forged)	HHA5
1914 P.D.	1914 P.D.	"From the Highlands"	Eric Flint	February 27, 2001 (in Changer of Worlds)	HHA3
c. 1914 P.D. (December)	c. 1914 P.D. (December)	"Nightfall" {expanded ch. 33 of Ashes of Victory}	David Weber	February 27, 2001 (in Changer of Worlds)	HHA3
c. 1915 P.D. (May)	c. 1915 P.D. (May)	"Fanatic"	Eric Flint	March 25, 2003 (in The Service of the Sword)	HHA4
c. 1918 P.D. (June)	c. 1918 P.D. (August)	"The Service of the Sword"	David Weber	March 25, 2003 (in The Service of the Sword)	HHA4
c. 1918 P.D.	c. 1919 P.D.	War of Honor	David Weber	October 2002	HH10
c. 1918 P.D.	c. 1919 P.D.	Crown of Slaves {takes place after the beginning and before the end of War of Honor, insert before ch. 22}	David Weber & Eric Flint	August 26, 2003	CS1
c. 1919 P.D.	c. 1919 P.D.	"The Silesian Command"	Jan Kotouč	February 7, 2023 (in What Price Victory?)	HHA7
1919 P.D. (November)	1922 P.D. (April)	Torch of Freedom	David Weber & Eric Flint	November 6, 2009	CS2
c. 1920 P.D. (June)	c. 1921 P.D. (June)	The Shadow of Saganami {between ch. 14 & 15 of Torch of Freedom}	David Weber	October 26, 2004	SI1
c. 1920 P.D. (July)	c. 1921 P.D. (August)	At All Costs {between ch. 14 & 15 of Torch of Freedom}	David Weber	November 2005	HH11
1921 P.D. (October)	1922 P.D. (April)	“Grayson Navy Letters Home”	Joelle Presby	2012, Baen Free Stories	—
c. 1921 P.D. (March)	c. 1921 P.D. (December)	Storm from the Shadows	David Weber	March 3, 2009	SI2
1921 P.D. (December)	1922 P.D. (May)	Mission of Honor	David Weber	June 29, 2010	HH12
c. 1921 P.D. (December)	c. 1922 P.D. (March)	"Obligated Service"	Joelle Presby	July 2, 2013 (in Beginnings)	HHA6
c. 1922 P.D.	c. 1922 P.D.	"If Wishes Were Space Cutters"	Joelle Presby	February 7, 2023 (in What Price Victory?)	HHA7
c. 1922 P.D. (March)	1922 P.D. (August)	A Rising Thunder	David Weber	March 1, 2012	HH13
1922 P.D. (February)	1922 P.D. (August)	Shadow of Freedom	David Weber	March 5, 2013	SI3
1922 P.D. (May)	1922 P.D. (October)	Cauldron of Ghosts	David Weber & Eric Flint	March 15, 2014	CS3
1921 P.D. (February)	1922 P.D. (October)	Shadow of Victory	David Weber	November 1, 2016	SI4
1922 P.D. (July)	1923 P.D. (March)	Uncompromising Honor	David Weber	October 2, 2018	HH14
1923 P.D. (February)	1924 P.D. (July)	To End in Fire	David Weber & Eric Flint	October 2021	CS4

== See also ==
- List of fictional universes in literature
