= Linda Evans (author) =

American science fiction writer

- Born: Linda Ellen Evans; December 6, 1958; Crawfordsville, IN
- Died: June 13, 2023 (aged 64); Pinellas Park, Florida
- Education: Flagler College
- Occupation: Author
- Writing career
- Genres: Science fiction, fantasy

Linda Ellen Evans (December 6, 1958 – June 13, 2023) was an American science fiction writer. She was an author of ten novels and four anthologies, as well as of several other co-authored novels. In 1996 her published novels had sold more than 100,000 copies. She has been published in English, German, and Russian, as well as hardback, paperback, and book-club editions.

== Early life ==
Evans was born December 25, 1958. She grew up in Crawfordsville, Indiana and attended Crawfordsville High School. After graduation she attended Flagler College in St. Augustine, Florida.

She began a career at the University of Florida in the 1980s, working in the university's College of Dentistry and its Gator Band office. During the 1990s, Evans was employed at the University of Florida's Institute of Food and Agricultural Sciences as a writer in the department of Marketing and Communications and during the late 2000s in the institute's International Programs office. Her title was Coordinator Educational Media/Communications and International Focus Newsletter Editor. She was a writer, editor, webmaster and web graphic designer, photographer and print-document graphic designer, marketing and public relations specialist, event coordinator, and international-visitor tour organizer. Evans retired from the University of Florida after a 28-year career there.

== Works ==
- Sleipnir — Baen (1994), As Evans' first published work, Sleipnir required ten years to produce between beginning to write and its first printing.
- Far Edge of Darkness — Baen; First Edition (July 1, 1996)

While many assume that Sleipnir was intended to be part of a series, this is not actually true. The novel was always intended to be a stand-alone work. A possible sequel has been contemplated. The ending is Heinleinian, in that it suggests action to come without actually intending for the story to continue. While some readers find this unsatisfying, the book did not, as is sometimes reported, end on a cliffhanger.

The second novel, Far Edge of Darkness, was intended as the first half of the story and it does end with a literal cliffhanger, meaning the story is unfinished and has been since 1996. The sequel is currently in outline stage.

=== Anthologies ===
Bolos 3: The Triumphant - Including novellas: "The Farmer's Wife", "Little Red Hen" (co-written with Robert R. Hollingsworth), and "Little Dog Gone"

Bolos 4: Last Stand (1996) - Includes Evans' fictional "historical essay" of humanity's contacts with alien races

Bolos 6: Cold Steel (2002) - Includes Evans' novella titled "Though Hell Should Bar the Way"

Worlds of Honor, in David Weber's Honor Harrington Universe. Includes Evans' novella "The Stray", which is a far-future murder mystery in which the sole witness is an alien incapable of producing verbal language

=== With David Weber ===
- Bolos: Book 3 The Triumphant

Includes 3 novellas by Evans (one in collaboration with Robert R. Hollingsworth) and David Weber wrote a fourth novella on his own; Evans' are "The Farmer's Wife", "Little Red Hen", and "Little Dog Gone"

- Worlds of Honor

Evans wrote the opening novella, "The Stray", while writing in Weber's Honor Harrington universe; Weber did not co-author that novella.

Hell's Gate series

- Hell's Gate ISBN 1-4165-0939-9 (2006)
- Hell Hath No Fury ISBN 1-4165-2101-1 (2007)
- The Road to Hell also with co-author Joelle Presby ISBN 978-1-4767-8067-2 (2016)

=== With John Ringo ===
- The Road to Damascus ISBN 0-7434-7187-3 (read online) (2004) - Written by Evans from John Ringo's outline, set in Keith Laumer's Bolos universe

=== With Robert Asprin ===
- Time Scout (1995)
- Wagers of Sin (1996)
- Ripping Time (2000)
- The House That Jack Built (2001)
- For King and Country (2002)

All of the Time Scout series are by Evans from outlines by Asprin. Ripping Time and The House That Jack Built are one complete story. The other three stand alone as novels.
