= David B. Mattingly =

American illustrator and painter

- Born: June 29, 1956 (age 68); Fort Collins, Colorado, United States
- Occupation(s): Illustrator, painter
- Known for: Book cover artwork
- Website: www.davidmattingly.com

David Burroughs Mattingly (born June 29, 1956) is an American illustrator and painter, best known for his numerous book covers of science fiction and fantasy literature.

== Early life and career ==
Mattingly was born in and grew up in Fort Collins, Colorado, and was inspired at age twelve to enter the visual arts, and discovered matte art. Mattingly first attended Colorado Institute of Art, then transferred to Art Center College of Art and Design. He left from there to take a job as a matte artist at Disney Studios. There he worked on the production of The Black Hole. He also worked on films including Tron, Dick Tracy, The Watcher in the Woods, and Stephen King's The Stand miniseries. After seven years, he became the head of the matte department there. He later worked on the films I, Robot and Hail, Caesar!.

After moving to New York, Mattingly was under contract at Ballantine Books. He has done more than 2000 book covers for Ballantine, Baen, Ballantine, Bantam, Berkley, Dell, Alfred A. Knopf, Marvel Comics, Omni, Playboy, Ace, Penguin, Scholastic, Signet, and Tor. He later took a matte art teaching position at the School of Visual Art, and then the Pratt Institute, where he is an adjunct professor. He teaches digital matte painting and compositing at both institutions. Mattingly is the subject of the 1996 book Alternate views, alternate universes: the art of David B. Mattingly by Cathleen Cogswell. He currently works as an independent matte artist and illustrator in addition to his teaching.

== Publications ==
David created 55 of 64 covers for K. A. Applegate's Animorphs series. He also created covers for all of David Weber's Honorverse science-fiction series. He has been the Artist Guest of Honor at a number of conventions, including Technicon 24 and Loscon 42. He has also published a handbook on digital matte painting, The Digital Matte Painting Handbook.

=== Books ===
- David B. Mattingly (2011), The Digital Matte Painting Handbook, Indianapolis, IN: Wiley; ISBN 978-0-470-92242-2
