= David Weber =

American science fiction and fantasy author (born 1952)

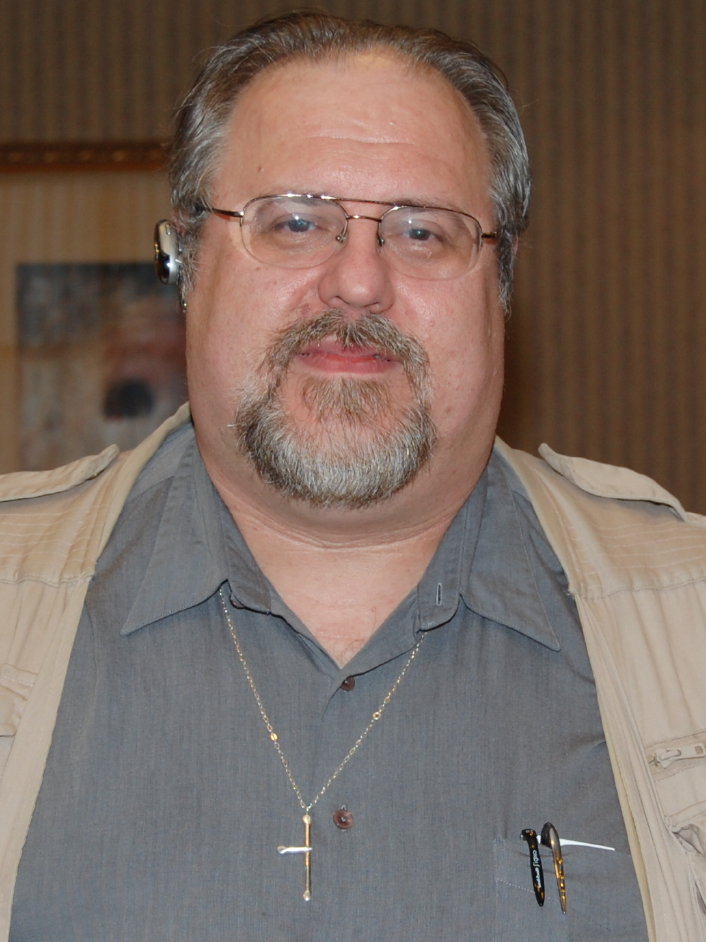
- Weber at CONduit 17 (26 May 2007)
- Born: David Mark Weber; October 24, 1952 (age 73); Cleveland, Ohio, U.S.
- Education: Warren Wilson College; Appalachian State University (MA)
- Occupations: Novelist, short story author
- Spouse: Sharon Weber/Sylvia Hipp(first wife)
- Children: 3
- Writing career
- Language: English
- Genres: Science fiction (esp. military science fiction), fantasy, alternate history)
- Notable works: Honor Harrington series, Safehold series, War God series
- Website: davidweber.net

David Mark Weber (born October 24, 1952) is an American science fiction and fantasy author. He has written several science-fiction and fantasy books series, the best-known of which is the Honor Harrington science-fiction series. His first novel, which he worked on with Steve White, sold in 1989 to Baen Books. The company remains Weber's major publisher.

== Writing career ==
Born in Cleveland, Ohio, on October 24, 1952, Weber began writing while in fifth grade. Some of Weber's first jobs within the writing/advertising world began after high school when he worked as copywriter, typesetter, proofreader, and paste-up artist. He later earned an undergraduate degree from Warren Wilson College in Asheville, North Carolina and an M.A. in history from Appalachian State University in Boone, North Carolina.

Weber's first published novels grew out of his work as a wargame designer for the Task Force board wargame Starfire. Weber used the Starfire universe as a setting for short stories that he wrote for the company's Nexus magazine, and he also wrote the Starfire novel Insurrection (1990) with Stephen White after Nexus was canceled; this book was the first in a tetralogy that concluded with their final collaboration, The Shiva Option (2002), which was included in The New York Times Best Seller list.

Weber was influenced by C. S. Forester, Patrick O'Brian, Keith Laumer, H. Beam Piper, Robert A. Heinlein, Roger Zelazny, Christopher Anvil and Anne McCaffrey.

Weber's novels range from epic fantasy (Oath of Swords, The War God's Own) to space opera (Path of the Fury, The Armageddon Inheritance) to alternate history (1632 series with Eric Flint) and military science fiction.

A lifetime military history buff, David Weber has carried his interest of history into his fiction. He is said to be interested in most periods of history, with a strong emphasis on the military and diplomatic aspects.

Weber prefers to write about strong characters. He develops a character's background story in advance in considerable detail because he wants to achieve that degree of comfort level with the character. Weber has said he writes primarily in the evenings and at night.

Weber says he makes an effort to accept as many invitations to science fiction conferences and conventions as he can, because he finds the direct feedback from readers that he gets at conventions extremely useful. He makes a habit of Tuckerizing people from fandom, particularly in the Honor Harrington books (see, e.g., Jordin Kare).

In 2008, Weber donated his archive to the Department of Rare Books and Special Collections at Northern Illinois University.

Weber received four Dragon Awards.

== Personal life ==
Weber and his wife, Sharon, live in Greenville, South Carolina with their three children and "a passel of dogs".

Weber is a lay speaker in the United Methodist Church, and he tries to explore in his writing how religions (both real-life and fictional) can be forces for good on the one hand, and misused to defend evil causes on the other.

Weber is a member of the American Small Business Administration, the Science Fiction and Fantasy Writers of America (SFWA), and the National Rifle Association of America.

== Published works ==
Weber's main works are contained in the following series:

- Honorverse
- Dahak
- War God
- Empire of Man
- Safehold
