= Ernest Martin Jehan =

- Born: 2 February 1878; Forest, Guernsey, Channel Islands
- Died: 7 December 1929 (aged 51)
- Military career
- Allegiance: United Kingdom
- Branch: Royal Navy
- Service years: 1894–1920
- Rank: Lieutenant
- Commands: HM Armed Smack Inverlyon; HMS PC-55
- Conflicts: First World War: Atlantic U-boat Campaign; Action of 15 August 1915
- Awards: Distinguished Service Cross

Ernest Martin Jehan DSC (2 February 1878 – 7 December 1929) was a British officer in the Royal Navy during the First World War. Jehan is best known for the sinking of a German U-boat by him and his crew aboard the smack Inverlyon. He began the war as a warrant officer and was decorated and commissioned after sinking SM UB-4 (2).

== Early life and career ==
Born in Forest, Guernsey, on 2 February 1878, Ernest Martin Jehan had worked as a plasterer before joining the Royal Navy on 8 February 1894, when he reached the age of eighteen; he signed up for 12 years service initially. At the age of 18, he was described as being 5 feet 2.5 inches (1.588 m) with dark brown hair, brown eyes and a "dark" complexion.

Jehan's first posting on 4 February 1894 was to the stone frigate HMS Impregnable, then based on the former HMS Howe, where he was rated boy seaman. He was then moved to HMS Boscawen (on the former HMS Trafalgar) on 22 February 1895, then HMS Victory I on 10 July 1895 and HMS Australia on 12 September 1895, where on turning eighteen he was rated ordinary seaman. He briefly returned to Victory I from 6 February before being posted to HMS Fox on 14 April 1896. He was rated able seaman on 11 June 1896, when he also began specialist gunnery training.

Jehan was posted to HMS Duke of Wellington I on 8 July 1899, and was rated leading seaman on 28 October 1899. He then transferred to the naval gunnery school HMS Excellent on Whale Island on 5 December 1899, and then briefly to the torpedo school HMS Vernon in September 1900, before returning to Excellent on 25 November. He was posted to HMS Duke of Wellington on 2 December HMS Raven on 9 December and back to Duke of Wellington I on 26 March 1901. He joined HMS Eclipse on 30 May 1901 and was rated petty officer 2nd class on 14 October. He returned Excellent 8 April 1903, and was rated petty officer 1st class on 17 June 1904. He briefly went back to Vernon on 28 June before returning to Excellent on 10 November. He was posted to HMS Sappho on 1 December 1904.

Jehan was then promoted to acting gunner (a warrant rank) on 11 April 1905. He served as an interpreter during a visit to Portsmouth by the French fleet in August 1905 but failed a preliminary French exam in October that year. His rank was confirmed on 2 April 1906. He was largely employed on training duties in various establishments around Portsmouth until on 11 July 1910, he was appointed to the crew that took the light cruiser HMCS Rainbow to Canada, one of two warships purchased by Canada from the British Admiralty. There he remained aboard the Canadian cruiser at Esquimalt, British Columbia, until ordered back to England in 1913, arriving back on 19 November. On 4 April 1914, just prior to the outbreak of the First World War, Jehan was posted to HMS Dryad, a torpedo boat converted into a minesweeper. From Dryad he was sent to Inverlyon as the commanding officer.

== Action of 15 August 1915 ==
Action of 15 August 1915
- Part of First World War; Atlantic U-boat Campaign
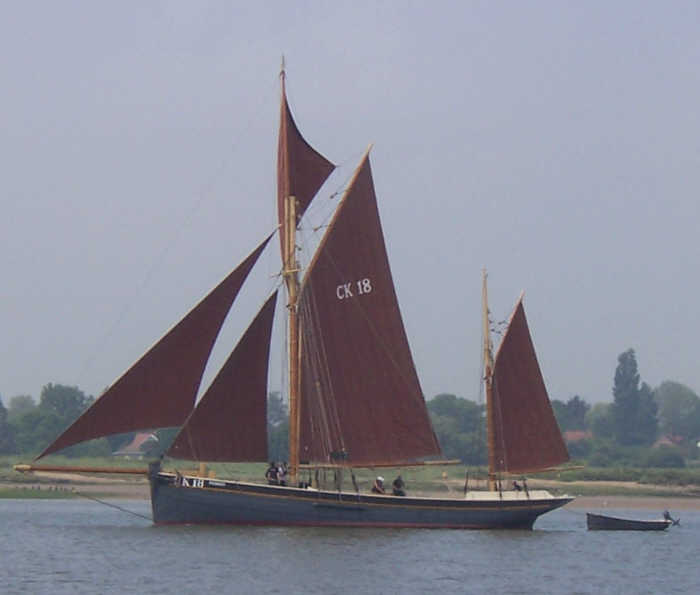
- A smack, similar to Inverlyon.
Date	15 August 1915
Location	off Great Yarmouth, England, North Sea, Atlantic Ocean
Result	British victory

Belligerents
United Kingdom	German Empire

Commanders and leaders
(United Kingdom) Ernest Martin Jehan	(German Empire) Karl Gross

Strength
1 smack	1 submarine

Casualties and losses
none	14 killed 1 submarine sunk

The action of 15 August 1915 was a small naval battle involving Ernest Jehan. In 1915, the German Empire had begun its first U-boat campaign of the First World War. U-boats operated all around the British Isles, attacking allied warships and merchant vessels. The allies therefore began conducting counter-submarine activities. One of the first countermeasures to be taken was the deployment of Q-ships, merchant ships armed with hidden heavy weapons to lure out and destroy German submarines.

Inverlyon, a fishing smack, was one of these vessels. Fitted with a 3-pounder and commanded by Jehan, Inverlyon sailed for enemy-infested waters. While sailing off the coast of Great Yarmouth on 14 August 1915, Gunner Jehan received news that a merchant ship, the Bona Fide, of 59 tons, had been stopped by the German submarine UB-4 and subsequently scuttled with explosives by a boarding party. By the next day Ernest had rushed to the Bona Fide's last known position, at about 20:20 hours, The German sub surfaced near the Inverlyon. Then from the submarine's conning tower came the shouts from a German sailor ordering Inverlyon's crew to prepare for boarding. Naturally the Q-ship disregarded the German officer's order. Jehan waited until the submarine came to 30 yards (27m) away, when he gave the command to raise the White Ensign and open fire. A series of three rounds from the sailing ship's gun struck the U-boat's conning tower and bridge, disabling the German commander. UB-4 then drifted behind Inverlyon, where her gun crew fired another six shots into UB-4's hull while others raked the sub with small arms fire. The U-boat then began to take on water from the bow area; the submarine was almost vertical before slipping beneath the waves and getting caught on Inverlyon's fishing net. Because the submarine was caught on Inverlyon's net, Jehan sent a message home asking if the submarine should be raised and salvaged. The Admiralty replied with a negative response, so the net was simply cut, allowing UB-4 to finish sinking to the bottom. All of the crew and commanding officer, Lt. Karl Gross, were killed. As result of the battle, Ernest Martin Jehan was awarded the Distinguished Service Cross on 19 November 1915, and promoted to lieutenant.

== After Inverlyon's cruise ==
By 1916, Jehan was relieved of the Inverlyon and sent to HMS Sarpedon as the executive officer. Later he commanded HMS PC-55 from 1919 to 1920 and retired on 29 October 1920. Jehan died on 7 December 1929 aged fifty-one.

== Notes ==
Due to Inverlyon's sinking of UB-4, Jehan became the first and only commander to sink a modern steel submarine with a sailing vessel. Daniel Herbert Jehan, who was possibly Ernest's twin brother, was also awarded the Distinguished Service Cross for his actions in the war. Ernest's son, Ernest Frederick Jehan, went on to fight in the Second World War.

== See also ==
- Action of 15 October 1917
- Action of 17 November 1917
- Felix von Luckner, commander of the Seeadler
- SMS Seeadler, a sail-rigged vessel that served with distinction during World War I.
- USS Irene Forsyte (IX-93), a sail-rigged Q-ship used by the US Navy during World War II
- USCGC Eagle (WIX-327), one of the last sail-rigged vessels to see combat in war.

== Bibliography ==
- Colledge, J. J. (1970). Ships of the Royal Navy: An Historical Index, Volume 2: Navy-built Trawlers, Drifters, Tugs and Requisitioned Ships. Newton Abbot: David & Charles. ISBN 978-0-7153-4396-8. OCLC 60073522.
- Gibson, R. H.; Maurice Prendergast (2003) [1931]. The German Submarine War, 1914–1918. Annapolis, Maryland: Naval Institute Press. ISBN 9781591143147. OCLC 52924732.
- Messimer, Dwight R. (2002). Verschollen: World War I U-boat losses. Annapolis, Maryland: Naval Institute Press. ISBN 978-1-55750-475-3. OCLC 231973419.
- Tarrant, V. E. (1989). The U-Boat Offensive: 1914–1945. Annapolis, Maryland: Naval Institute Press. ISBN 978-0-87021-764-7. OCLC 20338385.
