= HMS Fearless =

Seven ships of the Royal Navy have been named HMS Fearless:

- HMS Fearless (1794) was a 12-gun gunvessel launched in 1794 and wrecked in 1804 in Plymouth Sound in the company of a dockyard lighter. Heavy weather forced both vessels to cut from Cawsand Bay and drove them ashore near Redding Point. That only one man was lost was due to the efforts of Cawsands fishermen with lanterns and ropes.
- HMS Fearless (1805) was a 12-gun gun-brig launched in 1804 and wrecked, without loss of life, in 1812 on rocks of Cape St Sebastian near Cadiz.
- HMS Fearless (1837) was a wooden paddlewheel survey vessel, formerly the GPO's Flamer transferred and renamed in 1837, and broken up in 1875.
- HMS Fearless (1886) was a torpedo cruiser launched in 1886 and sold in 1905.
- HMS Fearless (1912) was an Active-class scout cruiser launched in 1912 and scrapped in 1921.
- HMS Fearless (H67) was an F-class destroyer launched in 1934. She was damaged by aircraft and scuttled in 1941.
- HMS Fearless (L10) was a Fearless-class landing platform dock launched in 1963. She participated in the Falklands War and the Gulf War, and was paid off in 2002.

== Battle honours ==
- Heligoland 1914
- Jutland 1916
- Norway 1940
- Atlantic 1941
- Malta Convoys 1941
- Mediterranean 1941
- Falkland Islands 1982

== In popular culture ==
- A fictional helicopter assault ship named HMS Fearless appears in the Axis of Time books.
- Two fictional Royal Manticoran Navy warships commanded by Honor Harrington are called HMS Fearless - a light cruiser that appears in On Basilisk Station and a heavy cruiser that appears in The Honor of the Queen, both books by David Weber.
- A fictional man-of-war named HMS Fearless appears in the game Assassin's Creed IV: Black Flag as half of one of the game's five separate "Legendary Ship" battles, alongside her sister ship, Royal Sovereign .
