= Fearless class =

Fearless class may refer to:

- Fearless-class landing platform dock
- Fearless-class patrol vessel

== See also ==
- HMS Fearless
