= HM Armed Smack Inverlyon =

British fishing boat

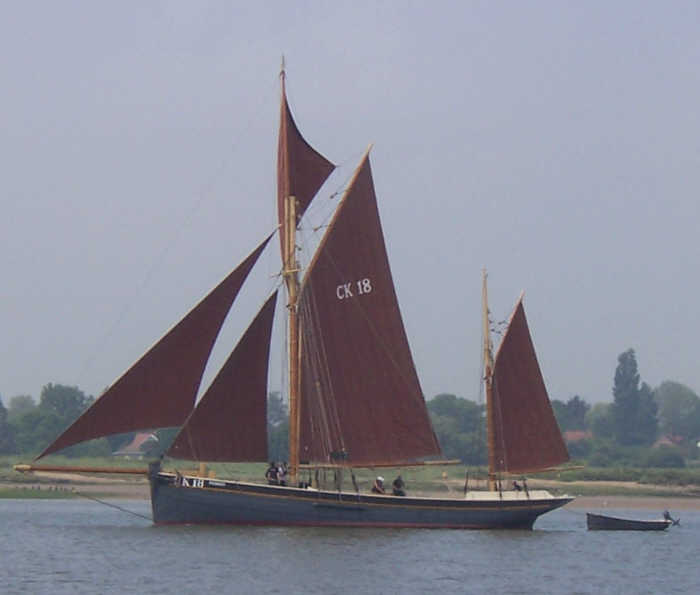
- A fishing smack similar to the "Inverlyon"

History

United Kingdom
- Name: Inverlyon
- In service: 2 August 1915
- Out of service: 1916
- Home port: Lowestoft
- Fate: Sunk, 1 February 1917

Service record
- Commanders: Gunner Ernest Martin Jehan
- Victories: German submarine UB-4
- Awards: Admiralty submarine bounty (cash award to crew)

General characteristics
- Type: Smack
- Tons burthen: 59
- Propulsion: None
- Sail plan: Two masts, fore-and-aft rigged
- Complement: 7
- Armament: 1 × 3-pounder (47 mm) or 6-pounder (57 mm) gun (Note: Hugh Perkins and J. David Perkins, whose works are substantially the same, identify Inverlyon's weapon as a 3-pounder (47 mm), while J. J. Colledge, in volume 2 of Ships of the Royal Navy, identifies it as a 6-pounder (57 mm) gun.)

His Majesty's or HM Armed Smack Inverlyon was a fishing smack that was converted to a Q-ship during the First World War. Q-ships served as decoys to lure German submarines near enough so that concealed weapons could be brought to bear and sink the submarines. On 15 August 1915, Inverlyon succeeded in luring German submarine UB-4 within range and sinking her with nine shots from her gun. The Royal Navy Gunner in command of the vessel, Ernest Martin Jehan, received the Distinguished Service Cross and members of Inverlyon's crew shared the bounty offered for German submarines. After Inverlyon's Q-ship career ended, she returned to fishing, but was sunk by U-55 on 1 February 1917.

== Career ==
Action of 15 August 1915
- Part of World War I Atlantic U-boat Campaign
Date	15 August 1915
Location	Off the coast of Great Yarmouth, England
Result	British victory

Belligerents
Imperial German Navy	Royal Navy

Commanders and leaders
Karl Gross †	Ernest Martin Jehan

Strength
UB-4, 14 crewmembers	Inverlyon, unknown number of crew

Casualties and losses
14 KIA, UB-4 sunk	none

Inverlyon was a fishing smack of 59 tons burthen that was a part of the fishing fleet at Lowestoft on the Suffolk coast. The wooden boat had a flush deck, two masts, and no engine. Inverlyon's sails were fore-and-aft rigged and may have been red ochre in colour, the traditional sail colour for British smacks.

In February 1915, Germany began its first submarine offensive of the First World War. During this campaign, enemy vessels in the German-defined war zone (German: Kriegsgebiet), which encompassed all waters around the United Kingdom, were to be sunk, and the British fishing fleet was not exempt. In mid-June, for example, the German submarine UB-2 had sunk six smacks off Lowestoft in a two-day period.

One method devised to deal with U-boat attacks was the decoy or Q-ship, designed to lure submarines that were targeting merchant shipping close enough that concealed guns or other weapons could sink them. Inverlyon was selected to become a Q-ship, was outfitted with either a 3-pounder (47 mm) or a 6-pounder (57 mm) gun, and entered the service of the Royal Navy on 2 August 1915. Inverlyon's fishing crew and skipper were all temporarily inducted into the Trawler section of the Royal Naval Reserve. Regular Royal Navy Gunner Ernest Martin Jehan and three other gunners from HMS Dryad—a former torpedo boat operating as a minesweeper from Lowestoft—were assigned to Inverlyon, with Jehan in command.

On 14 August, the 59-ton smack Bona Fide was stopped by a U-boat, boarded, and sunk with explosives 35 nautical miles (40 mi; 65 km) east-northeast from Lowestoft. This attack was probably by UB-4, because she was operating in that area on her fourteenth patrol. Regardless of the identity of Bona Fide's attacker, UB-4 did approach a group of smacks in the vicinity the next day. Unknown to UB-4's commander, Oberleutnant zur See Karl Gross, (Note: Karl Gross' name is also spelled as Karl Groß in some sources.) one of the fishing vessels was the disguised Inverlyon. (Note: Both of the Perkins works report the date of the encounter as Sunday, 16 August 1915, but 16 August 1915 was actually a Monday. Messimer (p. 129), Gibson and Prendergast (pp. 50–51), and Uboat.net (Helgason, Guðmundur. "WWI U-boats: UB 4". German and Austrian U-boats of World War I - Kaiserliche Marine - Uboat.net.) all report the date of the encounter as 15 August 1915.)

Around 20:20, UB-4 surfaced near Inverlyon, and Gross, on the conning tower of UB-4, began shouting out commands to Inverlyon's crew in German. Jehan, after waiting until UB-4 closed to within 30 yards (27 m) of Inverlyon, ordered the White Ensign raised and gave the command to open fire. A burst of three rounds from the Inverlyon's weapon scored hits on the conning tower, the second shot destroying part of the bridge and sending Gross into the water. UB-4, with no one at the helm, drifted behind Inverlyon, and when clear, Inverlyon's gunner unleashed another six shots into the hull of UB-4 at point-blank range. All the while, small arms fire from Inverlyon's crew peppered the submarine. The U-boat began going down by the bow, becoming nearly vertical before disappearing below the surface. Inverlyon's fishing skipper, a man named Phillips, dived in to attempt the rescue of a crewman from UB-4. Phillips was unable to reach him before the crewman went under and met same fate as Gross and UB-4's twelve other crewmen.

As UB-4 went down she fouled Inverlyon's nets—which had been deployed to keep up the appearance of a real fishing boat—essentially anchoring Inverlyon in place. The Q-ship's crew, not having a wireless set on board, sent word of the encounter with another smack. This was followed up by releasing messenger pigeons the following morning, requesting instructions on what to do with UB-4. The thought of salvaging the snagged U-boat was rejected, so the nets were cut, freeing UB-4 to sink to the bottom. UB-4's wreck lies at position 52°43′N 2°18′E. On 19 November 1915 Jehan was awarded the Distinguished Service Cross (DSC) for the sinking of UB-4, and the crewmen of Inverlyon split the submarine bounty paid by the Admiralty. (Note: There is no mention of the amount of the bounty for sinking UB-4, but the Admiralty bounties were typically £5 per crewman on the submarine, which would have been £70 in the case of UB-4. See: Messimer, pp. 158, 170, 222, for examples of the £5 per capita bounty.)

About three weeks after she sank UB-4, Inverlyon had the opportunity to sink another U-boat, but was unsuccessful. The U-boat encountered may have been either UB-2 or UB-16, which both sank fishing vessels in the area on 7 and 8 September. By 1916, Inverlyon had ended her short-lived Q-ship career and returned to being a fishing boat. Jehan, in addition to his DSC, was subsequently specially promoted to lieutenant on 4 January 1916 for his war service; he retired from the Royal Navy on 29 October 1920.

On 1 February 1917, the German submarine U-55 shelled and sank Inverlyon 15 nautical miles (28 km) from Trevose Head at position 50°47′N 5°5′W; there were no reported casualties.

== See also ==
- SMS Seeadler, a sail-rigged vessel that served with distinction during World War I.
- USS Irene Forsyte, a sail rigged Q-ship used by the US Navy during World War II
- USCGC Eagle, one of the last sail-rigged vessels to see combat in World War II.
- HMS Prize, a topsail schooner in which Lieutenant William Sanders earned the Victoria Cross for an action with U-93 during World War I

== Bibliography ==
- Colledge, J. J. (1970). Ships of the Royal Navy: An Historical Index, Volume 2: Navy-built Trawlers, Drifters, Tugs and Requisitioned Ships. Newton Abbot: David & Charles. ISBN 978-0-7153-4396-8. OCLC 60073522.
- Gibson, R. H.; Maurice Prendergast (2003) [1931]. The German Submarine War, 1914–1918. Annapolis, Maryland: Naval Institute Press. ISBN 9781591143147. OCLC 52924732.
- Messimer, Dwight R. (2002). Verschollen: World War I U-boat losses. Annapolis, Maryland: Naval Institute Press. ISBN 978-1-55750-475-3. OCLC 231973419.
- Tarrant, V. E. (1989). The U-Boat Offensive: 1914–1945. Annapolis, Maryland: Naval Institute Press. ISBN 978-0-87021-764-7. OCLC 20338385.
