= Flag in Exile =

1995 novel by David Weber

- First edition
- Author: David Weber
- Cover artist: Gary Ruddell
- Language: English
- Series: Honor Harrington series
- Genre: Military science fiction
- Publisher: Baen Books
- Publication date: 1995
- Publication place: United States
- Media type: Print (Paperback)
- Pages: 416
- ISBN: 0-671-31980-9
- OCLC: 45463432
- Dewey Decimal: 813/.54 21
- LC Class: PS3573.E217 F57 2001
- Preceded by: Field of Dishonor
- Followed by: Honor Among Enemies

Flag in Exile is a science fiction novel by American writer David Weber, first published in 1995. It is the fifth book in the Honor Harrington series. In the story, the disgraced Honor enters a self-imposed exile on Grayson.

== Plot summary ==
After the scandal caused by killing Pavel Young in a duel, Honor retreats to Grayson until things settle down on Manticore. She intends to oversee the development of her Steading, and overcome the death of Paul Tankersley.

Honor struggles with the survivor's guilt her many battles have left her with, but soon finds that she cannot afford to dwell on her emotions. With the war between Manticore and Haven still raging, the fast-expanding but still inexperienced Grayson Space Navy needs someone to put it in fighting shape. Honor is eventually given the rank of admiral in the Grayson navy and command of a superdreadnought squadron. She conducts her squadron and the rest of her adoptive nation's fleet through several battle exercises to improve them.

Meanwhile, Haven stages a new operation capturing two planets deep in Alliance territory. A Manticore task force and half the Grayson Navy leave to liberate these planets, but Haven was banking on this and now are sending another task force to destroy Grayson's orbital infrastructure and arm its rival planet, Masada, with modern weapons.

The events surrounding Honor's last adventure on Grayson have caused political turmoil on the reactionary, patriarchal planet. Even though she has the support of Protector Benjamin Mayhew IX and the Grayson government, and the respect and gratitude of the people of Grayson, several of her fellow Steadholders refuse to accept her and plot to bring down Mayhew's reforms by resorting to terrorism. They sabotage a dome which was being built and financed by Honor. The dome collapses mid-construction and kills dozens of young children. When it appears that the government discovered their conspiracy, they attempt to assassinate Honor but this fails as well. Reverend Julius Hanks, the head of the Grayson Church, gives his life to shield Honor from an assassin's fire, and the assassin is so horrified by his act that he surrenders to police custody and makes a full confession as to the conspiracy and its leader. When confronted at an assembly of the Steadholders, the leader invokes his ancient right to trial by combat and Honor herself, acting in her official capacity as Protector Benjamin's Champion, meets him sword-to-sword and kills him.

Shortly thereafter the Havenite task force arrives to destroy Grayson's orbital infrastructure, but underestimating the size of the remaining Grayson Navy they release their contingent destined for Masada before engaging and being defeated by Honor and the ships under her command. The released contingent turns to engage Grayson's now battle-damaged ships, but are bluffed into thinking that Honor's ships are not as badly damaged as they actually are and that reinforcements are in system, so they retreat back to Havenite space.

The other leading member of the conspiracy, desperate to keep himself safe, has most of his co-conspirators assassinated and personally votes for the government to heap even more accolades and titles on Honor.

== Themes ==
The book's depiction of Alfredo Yu, the redeemed ex-Havenite captain, starts the series' trend towards showing many of the Havenites as decent people on a personal level.

=== Author's note ===
An author's note from David Weber at the end of the book describes Weber's sorrow about the Oklahoma City bombing, which was somewhat similar to the destruction of Williard Mueller Middle School in the story and occurred after the writing of Flag in Exile, but before its publication.

== Reviews ==
- Review by Carolyn Cushman (1995) in Locus, #415 August 1995
- Review by John C. Bunnell (1995) in Dragon Magazine, September 1995
- Review by John C. Bunnell (1995) in Dragon Magazine, November 1995
- Review by Rachel Russell (1995) in Science Fiction Age, November 1995
- Review by Norm Hartman (1997) in Space & Time, Summer 1997

Preceded by Field of Dishonor	Honor Harrington books	Succeeded by Honor Among Enemies
