= UB4 =

UB4 may refer to

- UB4, a postcode district in the UB postcode area
- SM UB-4, a World War I German submarine
