= Field of Dishonor =

1994 novel by David Weber

- First edition
- Author: David Weber
- Cover artist: Gary Ruddell
- Language: English
- Series: Honor Harrington series
- Genre: Science fiction
- Published: 24 November 1994 (Baen Books)
- Publication place: United States
- Media type: Print (hardback & paperback)
- Pages: 352 pp (first edition, paperback)
- ISBN: 0-671-87624-4 (first edition, paperback)
- OCLC: 43962041
- Preceded by: The Short Victorious War
- Followed by: Flag in Exile

Field of Dishonor is a science fiction novel by American writer David Weber, first published in 1994. It is the fourth book in the Honor Harrington series, the only book in the series to not feature space warfare.

== Plot summary ==
Immediately following The Short Victorious War, Honor returns to Manticore as a hero following the victory at Hancock Station, her ship undergoing much needed repairs. Captain Pavel Young, Honor's bitterest enemy, is about to face a court-martial for cowardice before the enemy, punishable by death. Under threat from Young's father, Earl North Hollow, Young is instead demoted and dishonorably discharged from the Navy. Despite the reprieve, North Hollow suffers a fatal heart attack and Young becomes the new Earl of North Hollow. The Star Kingdom officially declares war on the People's Republic of Haven.

Seeking revenge on Honor, Pavel Young first tries to discredit her and then hires a professional duelist, former Royal Marine Denver Summervale, to challenge Honor's lover Paul Tankersley to a duel. Paul is killed by Summervale while Honor is on Grayson overseeing her Steading and formally being appointed Steadholder, as promised in The Honor of the Queen.

Paul's death is a severe blow to Honor, and she determines to kill Summervale no matter the cost to herself. Several of Honor's friends and comrades track Summervale to a hidden retreat where they force him to confess to being hired to kill Paul, though this immediately guarantees his immunity to prosecution given the way the confession is extracted.

Honor confronts Summervale and goads him into challenging her by calling him a paid assassin before witnesses. Both Young and Summervale are confidently expecting Honor to be killed, but she slaughters Summervale in the following duel. Honor then proclaims to the assembled media that Summervale was hired to kill Paul Tankersley and herself by Pavel Young.

Young goes into hiding, to deny Honor an opportunity to challenge him, planning to wait until repairs on the Nike are completed and Honor is shipped back to the front. Despite being ordered by Earl White Haven to not pursue Young, Honor uses a technicality of the House of Lords chamber rules to demand that she be formally seated with them, and uses the opportunity to denounce Young publicly and challenge him to a duel. Risking total loss of face and political strength, Young is forced to agree.

In the duel, Young panics and turns, shooting Honor in the back, before being cut down by Honor before the Master of the field can even react. The outraged aristocracy removes Honor from the House of Lords and political pressure forces the navy to remove Honor from command and place her on half-pay, with no active assignment. Honor decides to return to Grayson until the crisis subsides.

== Reviews ==
- Review by Carolyn Cushman (1994) in Locus, #404 September 1994
- Review by John C. Bunnell (1994) in Dragon Magazine, November 1994
- Review by Norm Hartman (1997) in Space & Time, Summer 1997

Preceded by The Short Victorious War	Honor Harrington books	Succeeded by Flag in Exile
