= Anacapa =

Anacapa may refer to:

- Anacapa Island, an island near the coast of California
- Anacapa Island Lighthouse, a lighthouse on Anacapa Island
- USS Anacapa (AG-49), a World War II Q-ship of the US Navy
- USCGC Anacapa (WPB-1335), an active cutter of the US Coast Guard
