= Honor Among Enemies =

1996 novel by David Weber

- First edition
- Author: David Weber
- Cover artist: David Mattingly
- Language: English
- Series: Honor Harrington series
- Genre: Military science fiction
- Publisher: Baen Books
- Publication date: 1996
- Publication place: United States
- Media type: Print (Paperback) & e-books
- Pages: 538
- ISBN: 0-671-87723-2
- OCLC: 34281858
- Dewey Decimal: 813/.54 20
- LC Class: PS3573.E217 H66 1996
- Preceded by: Flag in Exile
- Followed by: In Enemy Hands

Honor Among Enemies is a 1996 science fiction novel by American writer David Weber. It is the sixth book in the Honor Harrington series. In the book, Honor returns to active duty from her political exile on Grayson to command a Q-ship and fight space pirates.

== Plot summary ==
After more than three years in exile on Grayson, several of Honor's old political enemies decide to try to kill two birds with one stone. Klaus Hauptman is able to have Honor appointed as commander of HMAMC Wayfarer, a prototype Q-ship. He believes that Honor will either deal with the piracy problems that are causing him losses in the Silesian Confederacy or die trying. Due to the war consuming the majority of skilled officers and ratings, Honor is forced to take along a large portion of problem personnel and fresh out ratings on their first cruise.

Wayfarer includes space for carrying a squadron of Light Attack Craft (LACs), a large number of missile pods that can be quickly deployed through the ship's rear cargo doors, and unusually heavy energy weaponry for the ship's intended role, but it is essentially still a merchant ship: unarmored, much slower than a regular navy vessel, and with lighter defenses.

Honor's orders are to lead a squadron of four Q-ships to fight piracy in the Silesian Confederacy. Although piracy is a chronic problem in Silesia, the Royal Navy managed to keep it somewhat in check until the war began; with the fleet needed elsewhere piracy has gone completely out of control and the powerful Manticoran merchant cartels demand that the Navy do something. There are other considerations: Silesia is something of a disputed territory between the Star Kingdom of Manticore and the Andermani Empire.

While Honor leads her crew in battles against various pirates, the Havenites are also conducting covert commerce raiding in Silesia, in an attempt to destabilize Manticoran trade in the region and present themselves in a more favorable light to the Andermani.

The Havenite light cruiser PNS Vaubon, under Citizen Commander Warner Caslet, had been pursuing a particularly loathsome group of raiders whose actions were repugnant to most of the Havenite officers involved. When Caslet sees some of these raiders attacking what he thinks is a Manticore merchant ship he decides to attack the raiders, despite being outnumbered. The Wayfarer destroys the raiders and Caslet is forced to surrender Vaubon to the superior vessel.

With the additional intelligence gathered by the Havenites, Honor takes the fight to the pirates led by the terrorist Andre Warnecke and with a hostage gambit liberates the planet Sidemore, which had been occupied by the pirates.

A side plot during this is that of Aubrey Wanderman, a rating on his first cruise, who is brutally attacked by another rating, Randy Steilman. Terrified of Steilman's apparent untouchability, Wanderman refuses to report Steilman, and is taken under the wing of Horace Harkness, who trains Wanderman in the coup de vitesse, a form of martial arts. Later, after Steilman attempts to engineer the death of Ginger Lewis, Wanderman beats Steilman into a bloody mess, and Steilman's plot to desert is uncovered.

After her defeat of the pirates, Honor goes looking for the Havenite commerce raiders. This leads to a larger-scale conflict with Havenite forces. Klaus Hauptman has traveled on the liner Artemis to see the piracy situation first-hand in Silesia, and Honor encounters them just as the Havenites are closing in on the Artemis. In the ensuing battle, Wayfarer is able to destroy two Havenite battlecruisers but is itself ultimately destroyed. The few surviving members of Honor's crew, along with several Havenite prisoners, are rescued and return to Andermani space. Because of Honor's bravery in saving Hauptman's life during the battle the two are reconciled.

== Analysis ==
Honor Among Enemies also depicts life in the lower ranks of the Royal Manticoran Navy, following young crewman Aubrey Wanderman through his adaptation to life onboard Wayfarer and his troubles with and eventual victory over a band of thug-like crewmen. Steilman's bullying of Wanderman echoes midshipman Simpson's bullying of Hornblower in C.S. Forester's Mr. Midshipman Hornblower; Simpson, like Steilman was another disgruntled misfit, too old for his rank, seeking vengeance on someone better than himself.

The novel also plays up Honor Harrington's similarities with Horatio Hornblower, as one chapter shows Captain Harrington reading one of C.S. Forester's "darned good" Hornblower novels.

Like previous books in the series, a good portion of the novel is told from the perspective of People's Navy officers, including the aforementioned Warner Caslet and his tactical officer Shannon Foraker, introduced in the preceding Flag in Exile. Their motivations and characters are more fully explored and shown to be in many ways the moral equal of the Manticorans, including Caslet's determination to pursue raiders whose actions have gone beyond the pale, far outside acceptable practice under the laws of war. It also introduced Admiral Javier Giscard, commander of the Havenite raiders, and his political watchdog (and lover) Eloise Pritchart.

== Reviews ==
- Review by John C. Bunnell (1996) in Dragon Magazine, July 1996
- Review by Carolyn Cushman (1996) in Locus, #425 June 1996, (1996)
- Review by Pat McMurray (1997) in Vector 192
- Review by Neil Jones (1997) in Interzone, #118 April 1997

Preceded by Flag in Exile	Honor Harrington books	Succeeded by In Enemy Hands
