= HMS Fearless (L10) =

1965 Fearless-class landing platform dock of the Royal Navy

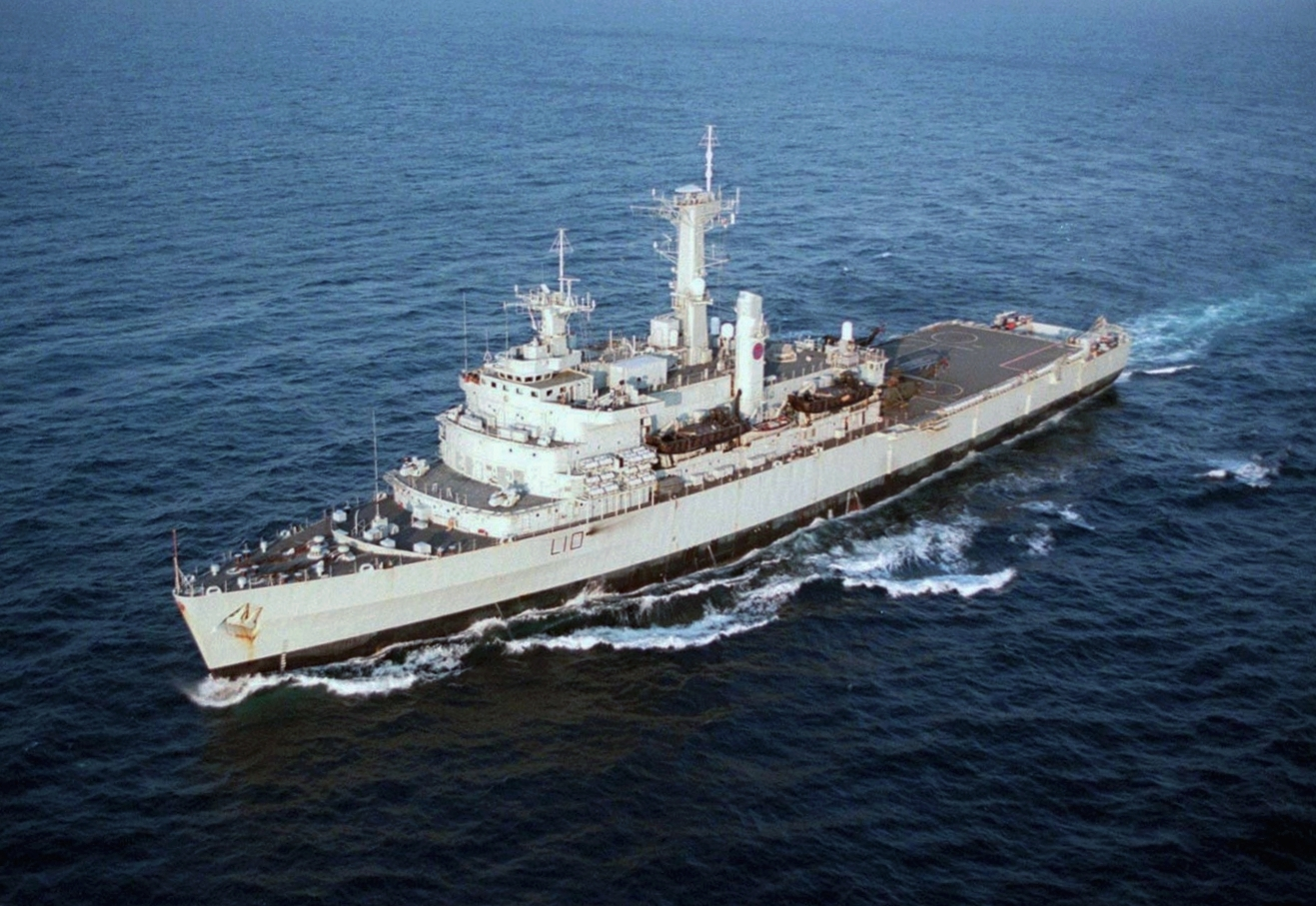
- HMS Fearless off North Carolina, 9 May 1996

History

United Kingdom
- Name: Fearless
- Builder: Harland and Wolff, Belfast
- Laid down: 25 July 1962
- Launched: 19 December 1963
- Sponsored by: Lady Hull, wife of Field Marshal Sir Richard Hull
- Commissioned: 25 November 1965
- Decommissioned: 18 March 2002
- Identification: Pennant L10; IMO number: 4907177
- Motto: Explicit Nomen; ("The name says it all")
- Fate: Scrapped Ghent harbour (BE) 2008

General characteristics
- Class & type: Fearless-class landing platform dock
- Displacement: 12,120 tons (full load)
- Length: 520 ft (160 m)
- Beam: 80 ft (24 m)
- Draught: 21 ft (6.4 m)
- Propulsion: 2 × English Electric 2 shaft geared steam turbines. 22,000 shp (16,000 kW) total
- Speed: 21 knots (39 km/h)
- Complement: 580
- Armament: 4 x 4 Seacat SAM (as originally fit); 2 × BMARC GAM B01 20 mm. single mounts; 2 × Phalanx CIWS (added post-Falklands War)
- Aircraft carried: Landing platform for up to 5 Sea King helicopters.

HMS Fearless (L10) was a Royal Navy amphibious assault ship that served from 1965 until 2002. One of two Fearless-class landing platform docks, she was based in HMNB Portsmouth and saw service around the world over her 37-year life. She was the last steam-powered surface ship in the Royal Navy.

The ship featured a floodable internal dock, accessed via a ramp at the stern for vehicles to embark, at sea, the stern would be partially submerged, allowing landing craft to load or unload vehicles and personnel directly from the deck. She carried four Landing Craft Utility (LCU)s in the well dock and four smaller Landing Craft Vehicle Personnel (LCVP) mounted on davits along the superstructure. Accommodation was provided for up to 400 embarked troops, which could be increased to 700.

== Role ==
The landing platform docks (LPD) supported a Royal Marines amphibious assault force and provided a platform for the Headquarters capability prior to, and during, the assault phase. The Royal Marines served aboard as the 4th Assault Squadron. The Squadron included crew for the four LCU, four LCVP and the Beach Party, which was equipped with a Land Rover, a Bedford 4-ton truck, two tractor units, one a track layer, the other equipped with a bucket, and a Centurion BARV. The squadron also had duties aboard, (ensuring equipment and troops got to shore as they were needed), radio operators and administration.

== Service ==
Fearless was the first purpose-built landing platform dock (LPD) commissioned by the Royal Navy. Constructed in Belfast by Harland and Wolff, she was launched in 1963 and completed sea trials before entering service in 1965.

Her first operational deployment involved acting as a command platform for British counter-terrorism operations in Aden, where she supported Royal Air Force aircraft and embarked elements of the Irish Guards. During the British withdrawal, she served as flagship of a 25-platform task group.

In 1968, following her service in Aden, Fearless was used as the venue for discussions between Harold Wilson and Ian Smith regarding the future of Rhodesia. Smith's government had issued a Unilateral Declaration of Independence (UDI) in defiance of Britain's position on ending white minority rule.

Between 1969 and 1970, Fearless was commanded by Captain John Gerard-Pearse. During this period, she undertook a tour of the Far East and provided emergency aid to Bangladesh following the Bhola cyclone, transporting 59 Royal Engineers Squadron, later reformed as 59 Independent Commando Squadron.

In July 1972, Fearless transported several Centurion AVRE demolition vehicles, derived from the Centurion tank, to Northern Ireland for deployment under Operation Motorman.

Fearless appeared in the 1977 James Bond film The Spy Who Loved Me, portraying the vessel that recovers Bond's escape pod and filmed the previous year near Malta.

=== Falklands War (1982) ===
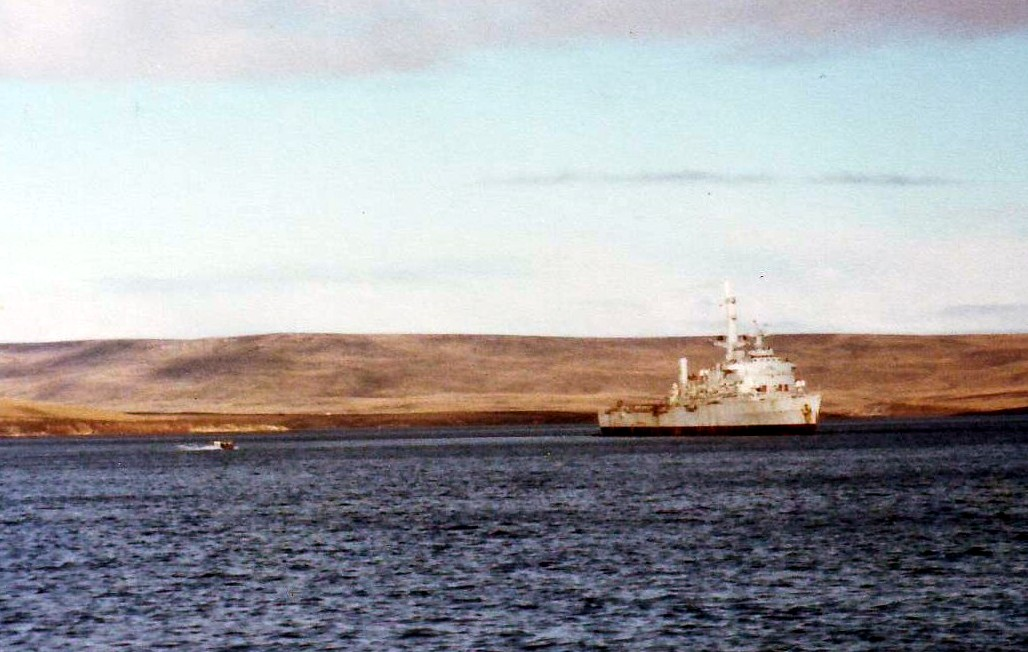
Fearless in San Carlos Water, during the Falklands War

Sounds on board of HMS Fearless during the Falklands War.

Fearless was part of the British naval force committed to Operation Corporate during the 1982 Falklands War. Equipped with modern satellite communications, she hosted the headquarters staff of Commodore Michael Clapp the Commodore Amphibious Warfare (COMAW), Brigadier Julian Thompson, Commanding Officer of 3 Commando Brigade, and elite elements of the landing force.

Two of her landing craft were instrumental in rescue operations following the bombing of HMS Ardent. Royal Marine Coxswain Corporal Alan White received a commendation from Admiral Sir John Fieldhouse after rescuing 41 crew in Foxtrot 7, one of four LCVPs aboard Fearless. Foxtrot 7 is now preserved at the Royal Marines Museum in Portsmouth. Acting Colour Sergeant Brian Johnston, the coxswain of HMS Fearless's Foxtrot 4, was posthumously awarded the Queen's Gallantry Medal for his actions rescuing more than 100 men from Antelope.

Rescue of Lt Lucero

Lieutenant Ricardo Lucero of the Argentine Air Force was shot down while attacking British ships in San Carlos Water on 25 May 1982. He ejected and was rescued by a Fearless LCU. He was treated aboard then transferred to the hospital ship Uganda. Lucero was killed in an air crash in March 2010.

Sinking of LCU F4

On 8 June 1982, Foxtrot 4 was tasked with carrying six Land Rovers loaded with vital communications equipment for 5th Infantry Brigade from Goose Green to Fitzroy. The craft had reached Goose Green during darkness but because the vehicles were urgently required forward, it began its return passage in daylight rather than waiting for darkness, despite the threat from Argentine air attack.

At about 19:50 local time and about 2.5 nautical miles east of Fox Point, Foxtrot 4 was attacked by four A-4B Skyhawks of Grupo 5. According to the Argentine Air Force's official history, Danilo Rubén Bolzán in C-204 attacked Foxtrot 4; a bomb struck the landing craft, destroying the stern and killing six of her eight-man crew, including Acting Colour Sergeant Johnston. Foxtrot 4 remained afloat long enough for the eleven survivors to be rescued. A replacement landing craft was subsequently named Foxtrot J in Johnston's memory.

The BARV from Fearless was stuck in deep mud whilst pushing an LCU of Blue Beach.

After the Argentine surrender on 14 June 1982, Fearless continued to support the landing force and amphibious operations, and eventually sailed back to Great Britain. She carried returning personnel from 3 Commando Brigade, vehicles and stores.

== Refit ==
She was placed out of commission in 1985 and remained inactive for three years before undergoing a two-year refit at Devonport, recommissioning in 1991. During the refit, her 1940s-era 40 mm Bofors guns and 1960s-era Sea Cat surface-to-air missile launchers were removed. In their place, two BMARC GAM-B01 20 mm cannons were installed on the bridge wings, along with two Phalanx CIWS mounts staggered on the mid deck.

From 1991 until 1995 she supported the sea training phase of initial officer training, undertaken at Britannia Royal Naval College, as part of the Dartmouth Training Squadron.

She was due to undertake an operation in the Gulf, but that was handed to HMS Ocean in 2000. Her last major duty was to take part in amphibious exercises shortly before decommissioning.

=== Decommissioned ===
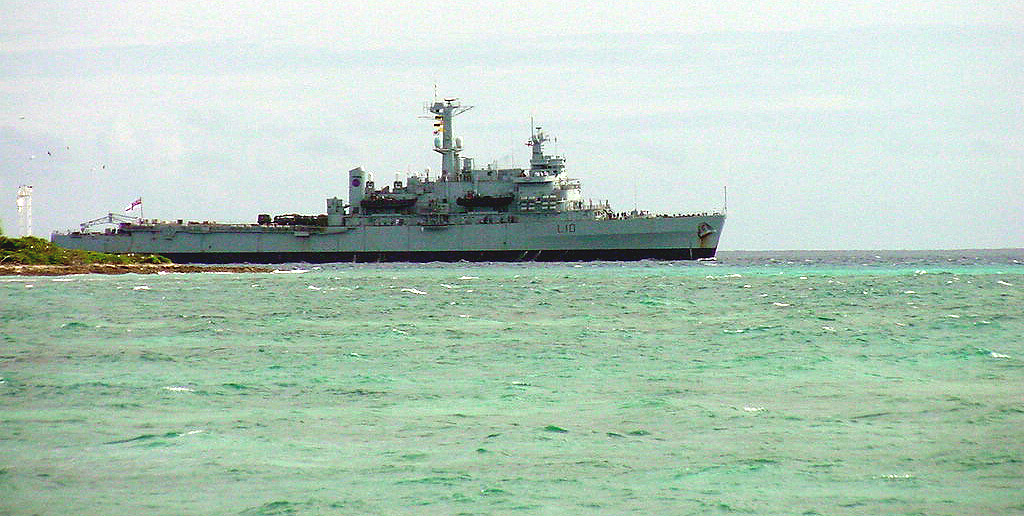
HMS Fearless in the Indian Ocean, 16 November 2001.

Fearless was decommissioned in 2002 and awaited disposal in Fareham Creek, Hampshire, moored alongside her sister ship Intrepid. In October 2007, it was reported that Fearless was to be scrapped in Belgium, five years after the vessel was officially mothballed in Portsmouth. On 17 December 2007, Fearless was towed to Ghent in Belgium to be broken. This was the first warship successfully exported for recycling by any Western government that fully complied with international agreements and the principles concerning environmentally sound management of waste.

Replacement LPDs Albion and Bulwark were ordered during the 1990s. They were commissioned in 2003 and 2005 respectively.
