= Forest, Guernsey =

Parish in southern Guernsey

Forest
- Parish
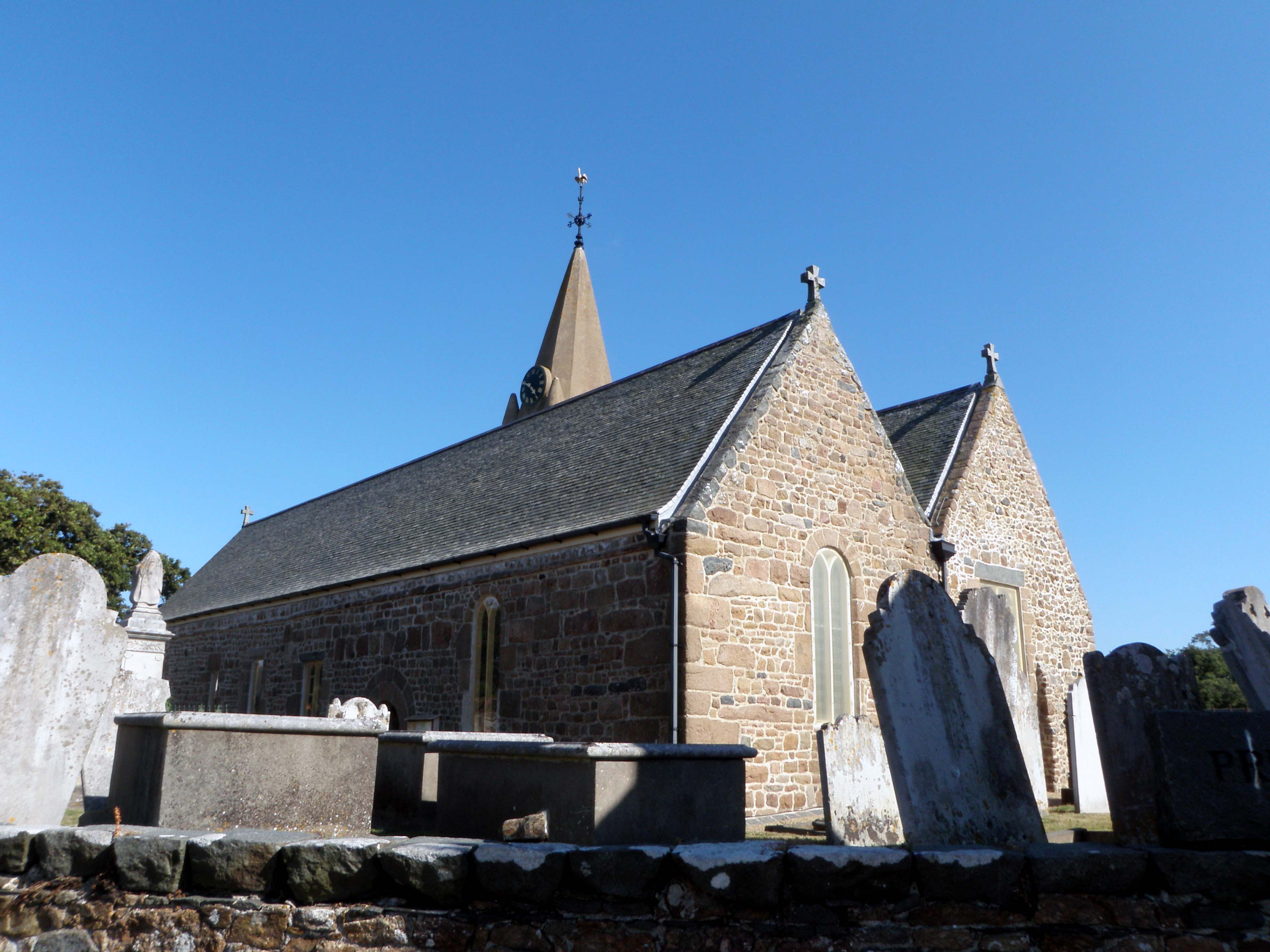
- Ste Marguerite de la Foret parish church

- Flag

- Location of Forest in Guernsey
- Coordinates: 49.4258°N 2.5976°W
- Crown Dependency: Guernsey, Channel Islands

Government
  - Electoral district: West

Area
  - Total: 4.2 km^{2} (1.6 sq mi)

Population (2019)
  - Total: 1,546
  - Density: 370/km^{2} (950/sq mi)
- Time zone: GMT
  - Summer (DST): UTC+01
- Website: www.forestparish.org.gg

The Forest (Guernésiais: La Fouarêt, French: La Forêt) is a parish in Guernsey. It is the highest parish on the island, with altitudes of up to about 100 m. The full title of the parish is Ste Marguerite de la Foret, after the parish church.

The old Guernésiais nickname for people from La Fouarêt was bourdaons (lit. 'bumblebees').

The postal codes for street addresses in this parish begin with GY8.

Forest was the first parish in the Island to receive some unwelcome visitors. Chief Officer Inspector W Sculpher recorded the following in the Occurrence Book dated Wednesday, 3 July 1940: "I beg to report that at about 8pm on 30th June a number of German Armed Forces landed at the Airport, Forest."

== Geography ==
The Forest is located in the south of Guernsey. It borders the parishes of St Peter's to the west, St Saviour's to the north-west, St Andrew's to the north and St Martin's to the east.

Beaches The south coast is mostly made up of cliffs, but the beaches in The Forest include:

- Le Portelet (inaccessible from land; it can be accessed by swimming from Petit Bôt or by boat)
- Part of Petit Bôt

Relief The parish goes up to an altitude of about 100 m (the highest in the island). The only low areas are at the coast, where there are steep cliffs.

== Climate ==
The Meteorological Observatory has been at Guernsey Airport since it was built in 1939.

Climate data for Forest, Guernsey (Guernsey Airport)
Month	Jan	Feb	Mar	Apr	May	Jun	Jul	Aug	Sep	Oct	Nov	Dec	Year
Record high °C (°F)	13.3 (55.9)	15.0 (59.0)	19.4 (66.9)	24.3 (75.7)	25.9 (78.6)	30.8 (87.4)	31.7 (89.1)	34.3 (93.7)	30.6 (87.1)	23.6 (74.5)	16.8 (62.2)	15.6 (60.1)	34.3 (93.7)
Mean daily maximum °C (°F)	8.7 (47.7)	8.4 (47.1)	10.0 (50.0)	11.8 (53.2)	14.9 (58.8)	17.5 (63.5)	19.5 (67.1)	19.8 (67.6)	18.0 (64.4)	15.1 (59.2)	11.8 (53.2)	9.5 (49.1)	13.8 (56.8)
Daily mean °C (°F)	6.9 (44.4)	6.5 (43.7)	7.8 (46.0)	9.2 (48.6)	12.1 (53.8)	14.5 (58.1)	16.6 (61.9)	17.0 (62.6)	15.5 (59.9)	13.0 (55.4)	10.0 (50.0)	7.8 (46.0)	11.4 (52.5)
Mean daily minimum °C (°F)	5.0 (41.0)	4.6 (40.3)	5.6 (42.1)	6.6 (43.9)	9.2 (48.6)	11.5 (52.7)	13.6 (56.5)	14.1 (57.4)	12.9 (55.2)	10.8 (51.4)	8.1 (46.6)	6.0 (42.8)	9.0 (48.2)
Record low °C (°F)	−7.8 (18.0)	−7.2 (19.0)	−2.2 (28.0)	−1.4 (29.5)	0.1 (32.2)	5.4 (41.7)	8.3 (46.9)	9.2 (48.6)	5.8 (42.4)	3.5 (38.3)	−0.8 (30.6)	−3.8 (25.2)	−7.8 (18.0)
Average precipitation mm (inches)	92.5 (3.64)	70.2 (2.76)	67.0 (2.64)	53.1 (2.09)	50.9 (2.00)	45.5 (1.79)	42.1 (1.66)	47.7 (1.88)	57.5 (2.26)	95.0 (3.74)	104.3 (4.11)	112.9 (4.44)	838.7 (33.02)
Average precipitation days (≥ 0.2 mm)	19.3	15.7	15.9	13.2	11.9	10.4	11.0	10.6	12.4	17.3	18.8	18.6	175.0
Average snowy days	2.8	4.0	1.3	0.6	0.0	0.0	0.0	0.0	0.0	0.0	0.5	1.7	11.0
Mean monthly sunshine hours	61.0	85.6	127.6	194.7	234.5	246.6	250.7	230.1	180.1	117.1	77.8	58.2	1,864
Percentage possible sunshine	22.7	29.1	34.7	47.7	49.6	51.2	51.7	52.0	47.8	35.3	28.7	22.8	41.8
Source: Guernsey Met Office 2014 Weather Report

== Features ==
The features of the parish include:

- Forest church
- Forest Methodist church
- Coast
  - A cliff walk along the South coast
  - Petit Bôt bay
  - Le Portelet
- Guernsey Airport
- Guernsey's highest point
- Le Perron du Roi megalith
- Military:
  - Parish war memorial inside church Lych gate
  - Tower 13, Petit Bôt Bay
  - St Clair Battery dating from the Napoleonic Wars
  - Saints Bay Battery dating from the Napoleonic Wars
  - German Occupation Museum
  - German fortifications, built during the occupation 1940–45
- Abreuvoirs
- A number of protected buildings

The parish of the Forest hosts:

- Forest Douzaine Room
- Aurigny has its head office on the airport property
- The Mallard Cinema
- Countryside walks
- The Met Office

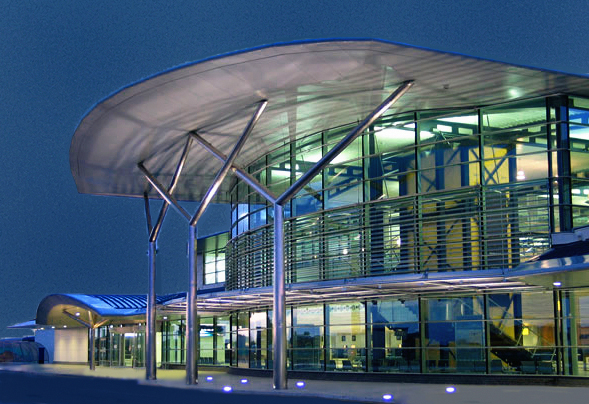
Guernsey Airport terminal

== Main roads ==
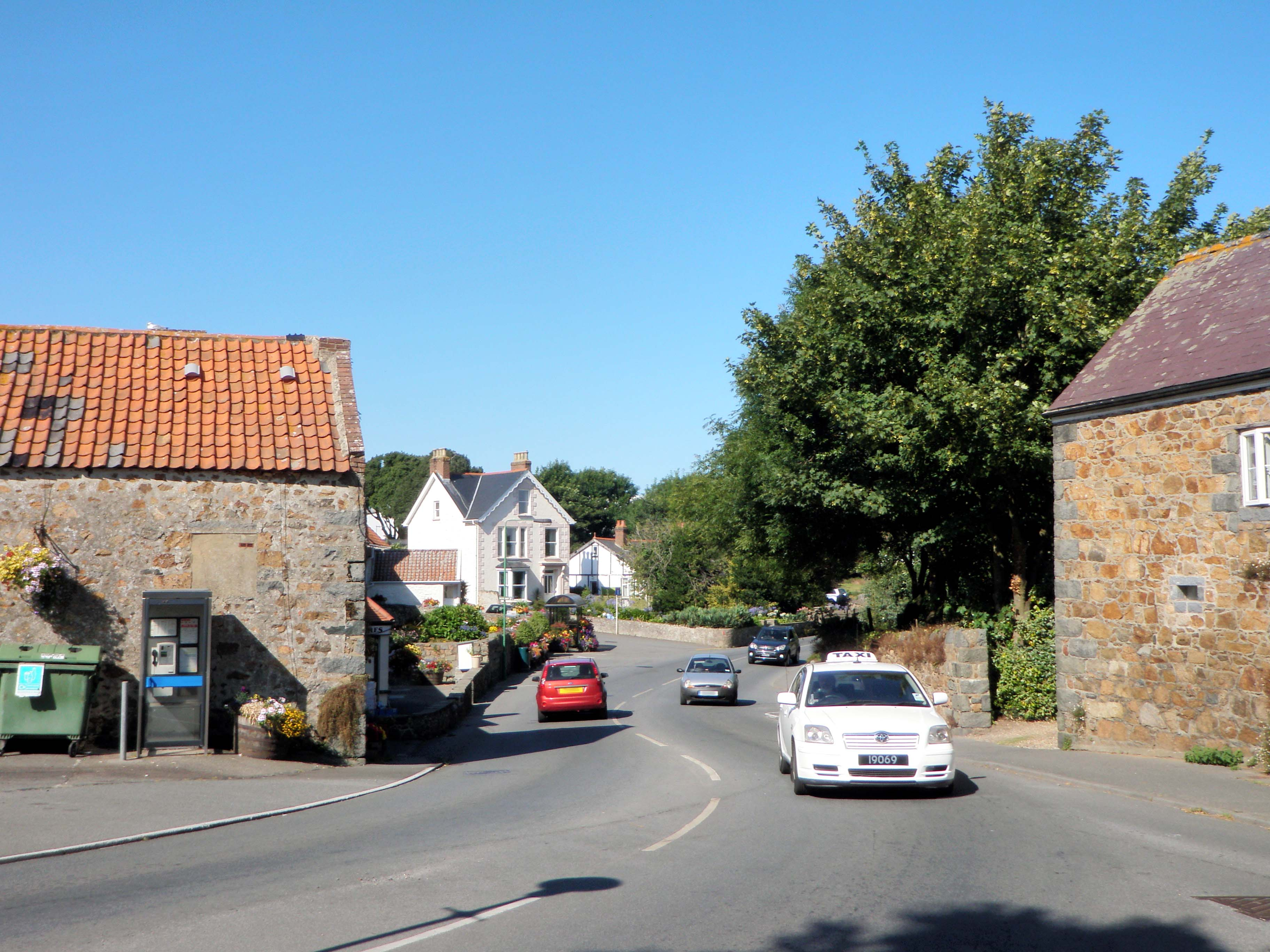
The road near Guernsey Airport

The following main roads (listed from west–east) provide important links between The Forest and the other parishes:

- Rue De Manoir (leads to Torteval)
- Rue De Farras (leads to St Peter's)
- Route Des Blicqs (leads to St Andrew's, St Peter Port and the North of the island)
- Forest Road (leads to St Martin's)

The following main roads (listed from west–east) are also very important as they provide access to the Parish Centre and the Airport:

- Rue Des Landes
- Le Bourg

== Politics ==
Forest comprised part of the West administrative division with Torteval, St. Saviour's and St. Pierre-du-Bois, until the 2018 referendum implemented a single constituency.

In the 2016 Guernsey general election there was a 3,188 or 74% turnout to elect five Deputies. Those elected (in order of votes received) being Al Brouard, Andrea Dudley-Owen, Emilie Yerby, David De Lisle and Shane Langlois.

== Notable people ==
- Ernest Martin Jehan, Royal Navy officer during World War I
- Thomas de la Rue, founder of De La Rue plc
- William Le Lacheur, sea captain with strong links to Costa Rica
