= The Short Victorious War =

1994 science fiction novel by David Weber

- First edition
- Author: David Weber
- Language: English
- Series: Honor Harrington series
- Genre: Military science fiction
- Publisher: Baen Books
- Publication date: 1994
- Publication place: United States
- Media type: Print (paperback) & e-book
- Pages: 376
- ISBN: 0-671-87596-5
- OCLC: 29980818
- Preceded by: The Honor of the Queen
- Followed by: Field of Dishonor

The Short Victorious War is a science fiction novel by American writer David Weber, first published in 1994. It is the third book in the Honor Harrington series.

Its title comes from a quotation by Vyacheslav von Plehve in reference to the Russo-Japanese War: "What this country needs is a short, victorious war to stem the tide of revolution." That quotation is one of the novel's two epigraphs; the other is a quotation from Robert Wilson Lynd: "The belief in the possibility of a short decisive war appears to be one of the most ancient and dangerous of human illusions."

== Plot summary ==
The People's Republic of Haven finds itself teetering at the edge of economic disaster. Unable to maintain its massive welfare state in the face of inflation and deficit and with opposition to the government getting bolder, the leaders of the People's Republic decide to resort to war against Manticore. A short, victorious war, they believe, will both distract the proles from their current economic problems and allow them to use the riches of the Manticore system to prop up their welfare state.

Meanwhile, Honor returns to duty after injuries she sustained in The Honor of the Queen to command the brand-new battlecruiser HMS Nike, the pride of the Royal Manticoran Navy, with some of her old crew aboard and with her old Academy friend Michelle Henke as executive officer. But on their way to her post, the engineers of the Nike discover a flaw in one of her fusion reactors, which hampers her first operational deployment to the critical Manticoran base at Hancock Station.

Honor spends the time her ship is in dock by beginning her first real romantic relationship with the senior engineering officer of Hancock Station's maintenance facility, Captain Junior Grade Paul Tankersley.

The Havenites start the war Honor had been struggling to prevent in the previous books. Their plan is to launch probing missions on Manticoran Alliance members to push the Alliance into re-deploying its forces to create weak points and allow them to strike at Manticore directly.

They are aided greatly in this through the use of Project Argus, stealthy sensor platforms purchased from the Solarian League and planted in Alliance systems to watch the movements of Manticore forces. Havenite ships on ballistic courses with no active systems are able to collect the data dumps from the sensor platforms without being detected by Manticore forces. When Admiral Sarnow's superior deploys most of Hancock Station's ships to other star systems to guard against further Havenite provocation, the Argus net allows the Havenites to see this weakness in the Manticore position, and they decide to attack Hancock Station in force.

Honor joins Admiral Mark Sarnow's fleet alongside her old enemy, Pavel Young. With most of the Royal Manticoran Navy deployed elsewhere to prevent the Havenite provocations, Honor and Admiral Sarnow find themselves forced to defend Hancock Station from a vastly superior Havenite armada. With the help of Honor's unorthodox tactics, the task force is able to hold off the Havenites for long enough for reinforcements to arrive. In the final stages of the battle Pavel Young, startled by an impact on his ship and technically in command of the formation, orders the formation to scatter. Honor, realizing the battle can still be won by quickly closing Manticore reinforcements, reassembles the fleet, resulting in a crushing Havenite defeat. At the end of the novel, Young is removed from command, placed under arrest and is to be court-martialed at Manticore. Capt. Tankersley is promoted to Captain of the List and ordered back to Manticore aboard Nike for reassignment.

After the first disastrous battles of the war, three Havenite revolutionaries—Robert S. Pierre, Oscar Saint-Just, and Cordelia Ransom—led the overthrow of their "Legislaturalist" government by killing hereditary President Harris and nearly his entire government during his birthday celebration with an air strike by shuttles of the Havenite Navy. They blame the killings on the Navy, and using the fear of a possible military coup form a "Committee of Public Safety" to rule the People's Republic "until a new government can be formed". They begin a purge of senior military officers and political figures to cement their rule.

== Analysis ==
This novel is much less Honor-centered than the previous two, and the war is depicted from many perspectives.

== Reviews ==
- Review by Carolyn Cushman (1994) in Locus, #398 March 1994
- Review by John C. Bunnell (1994) in Dragon Magazine, May 1994
- Review by Norm Hartman (1997) in Space & Time, Summer 1997

Preceded by The Honor of the Queen	Honor Harrington books	Succeeded by Field of Dishonor
