= Mary B Mitchell (Q-ship) =

1892 schooner converted to Q-ship

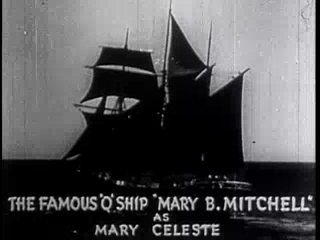

History

United Kingdom
- Name: Mary B Mitchell (Q-9)
- Completed: 1892
- Commissioned: 5 May 1916
- In service: 1916-1919
- Fate: Returned to merchanrt service 1919, wrecked 1944
- Notes: Converted to Q-ship at HMNB Falmouth

General characteristics
- Type: Q-ship
- Tonnage: 227 gross tons
- Length: 128 ft (39 m)
- Beam: 24 ft (7.3 m)
- Height: 11 ft (3.4 m)
- Propulsion: sail + auxiliary motor
- Armament: 1 ×12 pounder naval gun, 2 × 6 pounder guns, 2 × Lewis guns
- Notes: motor & armaments fitted 1916, disarmed 1919

Mary B Mitchell was a British schooner completed in 1892 that served as a Q-ship during the First World War. She was in service from April 1916 until the end of hostilities, operating in the Southwest Approaches from her base in Falmouth. She had several encounters with German U-boats in her career, and was credited with the destruction of two, though post-war analysis established that no U-boats were sunk. She had a reputation for being an efficient and successful vessel.

After the war she returned to merchant service but was wrecked in 1944.

== Early career ==
Mary B Mitchell was built by Paul Rogers in 1892 at Carrickfergus, as a three-masted topsail schooner. She was owned by Lord Penrhyn and served for a period as a yacht, before being put to work as a coaster. In 1916 she was requisitioned by the Admiralty to be used as a Q-ship.

== Service history: World War One ==
In April 1916 she was at Falmouth, where she was requisitioned for service as a Q-ship. She was armed and outfitted, under the command of Lt. M Armstrong RNR, to carry a 12-pounder and two 6-pounder guns as well as two machine guns and small arms. She commissioned on 5 May 1916 and sailed on her first patrol on 26 June, returning to Falmouth on 25 July. During this period she sailed the usual sea routes in the Channel and the Southwest Approaches, masquerading as a merchant ship and inviting attack by a German U-boat. Over the following months she undertook a series of such patrols, in a variety of disguises. Great success was claimed

On 20 June 1917, under the command of Lt J Lawrie and in the guise of the French schooner Eider, she encountered a U-boat sailing west of Brittany, which approached and opened fire. Mitchell carried out her role as a decoy, being hove to and abandoned until he U-boat was within 600 yards, when she returned fire scoring several hits. At this the U-boat dived and was not seen again. The U-boat, later identified as UC-65, was not damaged. That evening, Mitchell had a further encounter, which unfolded in the same way, though on this occasion the U-boat was more wary, and Mitchell's crew had a more difficult time before scoring hits on their assailant. This U-boat, UC-17, was also not damaged.

On 3 August 1917 Mitchell had her third encounter, sailing south of Start Point in the guise of the French schooner Cancalais. She encountered a U-boat, UC-75, which approached, opening fire at a range of nearly three miles. Mitchell's crew again hove to and the panic party abandoned ship, while the gun crews waited for their target to come into range. However the U-boat was too cautious, and after being shelled for fifteen minutes, Lawrie elected to clear away and close under engine power. Mitchell was able to score some hits before the U-boat disappeared, but no loss was confirmed. For these actions Lawrie was awarded the DSO.

== Later career ==
Mary B Mitchell was decommissioned in 1919 and returned to merchant service. She appeared in the 1935 Hammer film The Mystery of the Mary Celeste as the Mary Celeste.

She had a long career surviving into the Second World War. In December 1944 she was wrecked in a gale in the Solway Firth and written off.

== Commemoration ==
Inscription on commemorative plaque, Bangor town centre.

"The Mary B Mitchell was the most famous of the Port Penrhyn slate ships and a local legend.
She was a three-masted topsail schooner built by Paul Rodgers at Carrickfergus in 1892.
Length overall was 129 feet and beam 24 feet.
With her local crew she delivered slate to Hamburg and London until the First World War when, in 1916 she became one of the first "Q" ships or decoy vessels.
With her twelve pounder and two six pounders she was responsible while under sail for sinking at least two submarines in the western approaches in 1917.

After the war she had engines fitted and returned to trade.
She almost survived the Second World War but was driven ashore in a gale in the Solway in December 1944.
All the crew were saved."

February 1998

The Mary B Mitchell is commemorated in Bangor, Wales, by a memorial plaque and a bronze weathervane which adorns the city’s new shopping precinct. It was designed and made by Ann Catrin Evans and Roger Wyn Evans. The plaque gives a brief account of the ships history, while the weathervane depicts her in silhouette.

== Assessment ==
The Mary B Mitchell had a good reputation as a Q-ship following the First World War, being credited with the destruction of two U-boats. This reputation has persisted to this day, although post-war analysis showed neither of the U-boats she engaged had been sunk, and that her achievement had been overestimated.

Opinions differ on the effectiveness of the Q-ships. One source regards them as greatly overrated, diverting skilled seamen from other duties without sinking enough U-boats to justify the strategy, while another suggests Q-ships were all the more important in the early stages of the fight against the U-boat because so few methods had appeared to work, though their effectiveness declined as the war at sea progressed.

== See also ==
- SMS Seeadler (1915)

== Bibliography ==
- Chatterton, E Keble : Q-Ships and their story. (1922) ISBN (none)
- Forde, Frank (2000) [1981]. The Long Watch. Dublin: New Island Books. ISBN 1-902602-42-0.
- Forde, Frank (1988). Maritime Arklow. Dún Laoghaire: Glendale Press. ISBN 0-907606-51-2.
- Halpern, Paul (1995) A Naval History of World War I Routledge ISBN 1-85728-498-4
- Preston, Antony (1982). Submarines. London: Bison Books. ISBN 0-86124-043-X.
- Ritchie, Carson (1985). Q-Ships. ISBN 0-86138-011-8.
