= Q-ship =

Heavily armed merchant ships with concealed weaponry

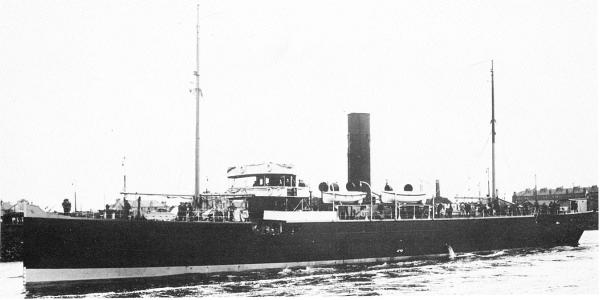
British First World War Q-ship HMS Tamarisk

Q-ships, also known as Q-boats, decoy vessels, special service ships, or mystery ships, were heavily armed merchant ships with concealed weaponry, designed to lure submarines into making surface attacks. This gave Q-ships the chance to open fire and sink them.

They were used by the British Royal Navy and the German Kaiserliche Marine during the First World War and by the Royal Navy, the Kriegsmarine, the Imperial Japanese Navy, and the United States Navy during the Second World War.

Though legally recognised as an acceptable tactic of military deception, there has been debate as to their usefulness in combat, enjoying only marginal success.

== Etymology ==
The Q in Q-ship stands for Queenstown, in Ireland, because Haulbowline Dockyard, in Cork Harbour, was responsible for the conversion of many mercantile steamers to armed decoy ships during the First World War. The majority appear to have been converted in larger navy yards such as Devonport.

== Early uses of the concept ==
The general idea and legal framework for the Q-ship derives from the classic ruse de guerre of "sailing under false colours". As a long standing element of naval tactics, warships may legally disguise themselves in various ways in transit so long as the proper flags are hoisted before firing commences. Numerous examples exist of the tactic, which is used both defensively and offensively.

Examples of the tactic used against commerce raiders are HMS Kingfisher in the 1670s and French disguised brigs during the French Revolutionary Wars. An example of the latter was beaten back by the privateer lugger Vulture out of Jersey.

== First World War ==
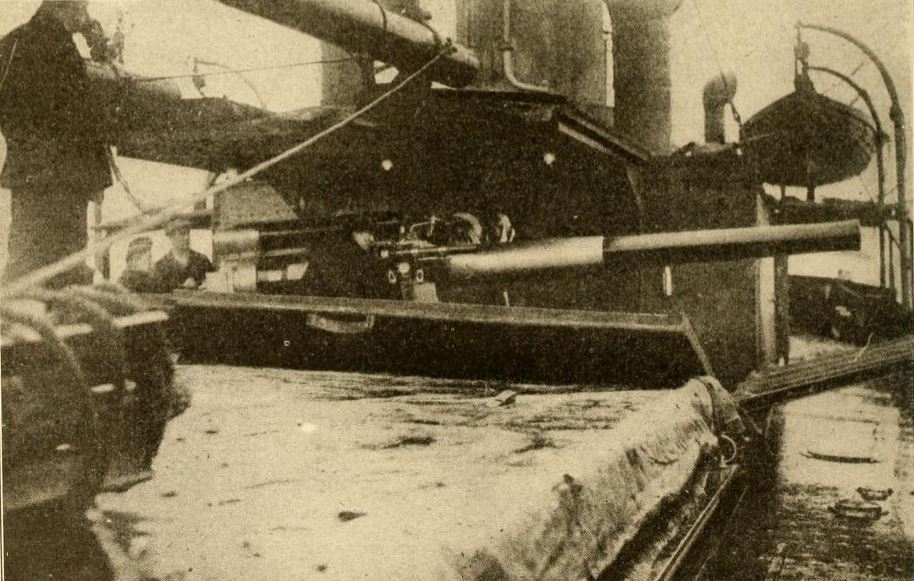
Q-ships hid naval guns behind moveable or pivoting panels

=== Royal Navy ===
In 1915, during the First Battle of the Atlantic, Britain was in need of a countermeasure against the U-boats that were harassing its sea lanes. Convoys, which had proved effective in earlier times (and would again prove effective during the Second World War), were rejected by the resource-strapped Admiralty and the independent captains. Depth charges would start to become available only in early 1916 and so almost the only chance of sinking a submarine was by gunfire or by ramming while on the surface.

Submarines could attack by torpedo or by deck gun. Torpedoes can be used while the vessel is submerged and invisible to her target, and deck guns are used on the surface. Torpedoes were expensive, unreliable, and a submarine only carried a limited number of them. Ammunition for a deck gun, however, was inexpensive and plentiful in comparison. As a result, submarine captains preferred to surface and use their deck gun on most targets. However, when encountering a warship, submarine commanders could recognise the threat they posed and use a torpedo, or simply not engage.

A solution to this was the creation of the Q-ship, one of the most closely guarded secrets of the war. Their codename referred to the vessels' home port, Queenstown, in Ireland. They became known by the Germans as a U-Boot-Falle ("U-boat trap"). A Q-ship would appear to be an unarmed merchant ship and so an easy target but in fact was a warship that carried hidden armaments. A typical Q-ship might resemble a tramp steamer sailing alone in an area that a U-boat was reported to be operating.

By seeming to be a suitable target for the U-boat's deck gun, a Q-ship was intended to lure a submarine into surfacing to attack. Once the U-boat was vulnerable, perhaps even gulled further by pretence of some crew dressed as civilian mariners "abandoning ship" and taking to a boat, the Q-ship would drop its panels and immediately open fire with its deck guns. At the same time, the vessel would reveal her true colours by raising the White Ensign (the Royal Navy flag). When successfully fooled, a U-boat could quickly become overwhelmed by several guns to its one or defer from firing and try to submerge before it became mortally wounded.

The first Q-ship victory was on 23 June 1915, when the submarine HMS C24, cooperating with the decoy vessel Taranaki, sank U-40 off Eyemouth. The first victory by an unassisted Q-ship came on 24 July 1915 when Prince Charles sank U-36. The civilian crew of Prince Charles received a cash award. The following month an even smaller converted fishing trawler renamed HM Armed Smack Inverlyon successfully destroyed UB-4 near Great Yarmouth. Inverlyon was an unpowered sailing ship fitted with a small 3-pounder (47 mm) gun. The British crew fired nine rounds from their 3-pounder into UB-4 at close range, sinking her with the loss of all hands despite the attempt of Inverlyon's commander to rescue one surviving German submariner.

On 19 August 1915, HMS Baralong sank U-27, which was preparing to attack the nearby merchant ship Nicosian. About a dozen of the U-boat sailors survived and swam towards the merchant ship. The commanding officer, allegedly fearing that they might scuttle her, ordered the survivors to be shot in the water and sent a boarding party to kill all who had made it aboard. This became known as the "Baralong incident".

HMS Farnborough (Q.5) sank U-68 on 22 March 1916. Her commander, Gordon Campbell, was awarded the Victoria Cross (VC). New Zealanders Lieutenant Andrew Dougall Blair and Sub-Lieutenant William Edward Sanders faced three U-boats simultaneously in Helgoland (Q.17) while becalmed and without engines or wireless. Forced to return fire early, they managed to sink one U-boat and avoid two torpedo attacks. Sanders was promoted to lieutenant commander, eventually commanding the topsail schooner HMS Prize in command of which he was awarded the Victoria Cross for an action on 30 April 1917 with U-93, which was severely damaged. Helgoland, while the ship sustained heavy shellfire, waited until the submarine was within 80 yards (73 m), whereupon he hoisted the White Ensign and Prize opened fire. The submarine appeared to sink and he claimed a victory. However, the badly damaged submarine managed to struggle back to port. With his ship accurately described by the survivors of U-93, Sanders and his crewmen were all killed in action when they attempted a surprise attack on UB-48 on 14 August 1917.

According to Warships of World War I by H. M. LeFleming, the Royal Navy converted 58 from merchant ships (18 were sunk by U-boats), in addition to 40 Flower-class sloops and 20 PC-boats. However Conway's All the World's Fighting Ships 1906–1921 claims that no fewer than 157 named submarine decoy vessels converted from other types of ship, in addition to another ten whose name was unknown. It agrees with LeFleming about the number of sloops and PC-boats. These ones were completed as Q-ships, disguised as coastal freighters and differed from regular service PC-boats. None was lost in the war. The Flower-class sloops were designed on merchant ship lines thus making them easily adaptable for conversion to Q-ships, 39 being completed as such while the other was converted after being torpedoed. These all had single funnels as the merchant ship silhouette was left to the builders. The "Flower-Q's" were employed mainly on convoy and anti-submarine work. Nine were lost during the war.

After the war, it was concluded that the effectiveness of the Q-ship initiative had been greatly overrated by diverting skilled seamen from other duties without sinking enough U-boats to justify the strategy. Estimates differ because of the uncertainty of the attribution of lost submarines, but in a total of approximately 150 engagements, British Q-ships destroyed or assisted in the loss of around 12 to 15 U-boats and damaged 60, at a cost of 27 to 38 Q-ships lost out of about 200. Q-ships were thus responsible for under 10% of all U-boats sunk, ranking them well below the use of ordinary minefields in effectiveness. Around half of Q-ship successes took place in June to September 1915, after which the ships were much less effective. With the second round of unrestricted submarine warfare in 1917, Q-ships sunk only 3 submarines, dwarfed by the ~28 sunk by undisguised warships.

=== Imperial German Navy ===
The Imperial German Navy commissioned six Q-boats during the Great War for the Baltic Sea into the Handelsschutzflottille. None was successful in destroying enemy submarines. The German Q-ship Schiff K heavily damaged the Russian submarine Gepard of the Bars class on 27 May 1916. The famous Möwe and Wolf were merchant raiders, vessels designed to disrupt enemy trade and sink merchantmen, rather than attack enemy warships.

== Second World War ==
=== Germany ===
Germany employed at least 13 Q-ships, including the Schürbeck which sank the British submarine HMS Tarpon. The German Atlantis, which sank a number of ships with a total tonnage of 145,960 t including the Norwegian tanker Tirranna on 10 June 1940, was more of a merchant raider.

=== Japan ===
The Imperial Japanese Navy converted the 2,205-ton merchant ship Delhi Maru into a Q-ship. On 15 January 1944, she departed from Nagaura (now Sodegaura on Tokyo Bay) on her first mission in company with the submarine chaser Ch-50 and the netlayer Tatu Maru. At 22:00, the vessels were detected by the submarine USS Swordfish, which launched three torpedoes. Delhi Maru was hit by all three on her port bow; following a number of internal explosions, she broke in two, the forward section sinking immediately and the aft section sinking later in heavy seas. Although Swordfish was depth charged by Ch-50, she escaped unscathed.

=== United Kingdom ===
Nine Q-ships were commissioned by the Royal Navy in September and October 1939 for work in the North Atlantic:

- 610-ton HMS Chatsgrove (X85) ex-Royal Navy P-class sloop PC-74 built 1918
- 5,072-ton HMS Maunder (X28) ex-King Gruffyd built 1919
- 4,443-ton HMS Prunella (X02) ex-Cape Howe built 1930
- 5,119-ton HMS Lambridge (X15) ex-Botlea built 1917
- 4,702-ton HMS Edgehill (X39) ex-Willamette Valley built 1928
- 5,945-ton HMS Brutus (X96) ex-City of Durban built 1921
- 4,398-ton HMS Cyprus (X44) ex-Cape Sable built 1936
- 1,030-ton HMS Looe (X63) ex-Beauty built 1924
- 1,090-ton HMS Antoine (X72) ex-Orchy built 1930

Prunella and Edgehill were torpedoed and sunk on 21 and 29 June 1940 without even sighting a U-boat. The rest of the vessels were paid off in March 1941 without successfully accomplishing any mission.

=== United States ===
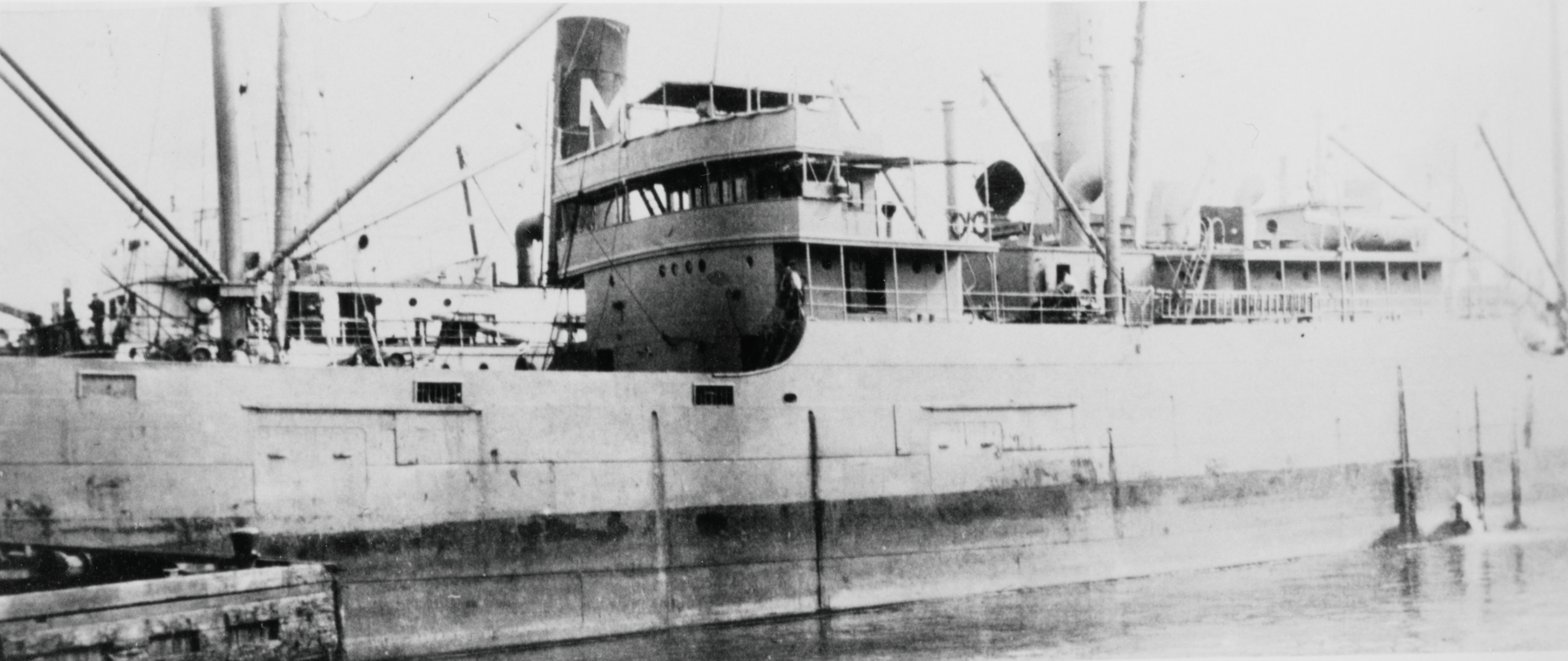
USS Atik (AK-101)

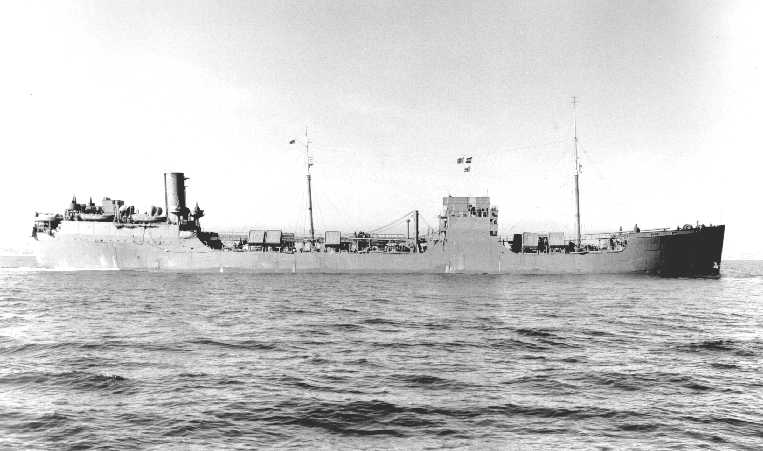
USS Big Horn (AO-45)

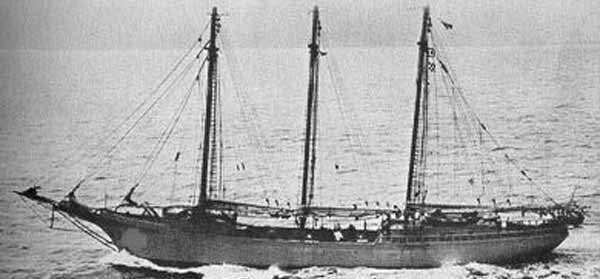
USS Irene Forsyte (IX-93)

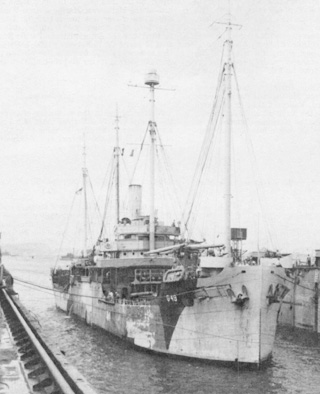
Hinged flaps aft of the anchor hid 3-inch guns aboard USS Anacapa (AG-49)

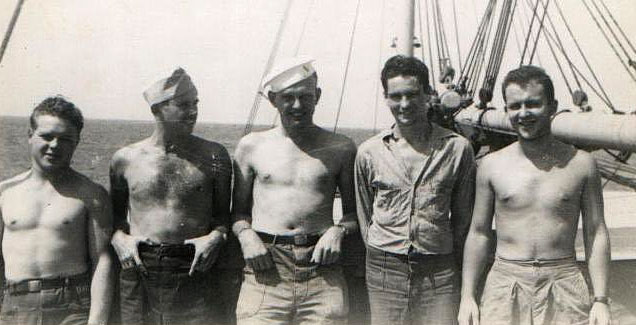
Yeomen and supply clerks of USS Anacapa exhibiting non-regulation attire typical of U.S. sleeper ship duty to imitate merchant vessels

By 12 January 1942, the British Admiralty's intelligence community had noted a "heavy concentration" of U-boats off the "North American seaboard from New York to Cape Race" and passed along this fact to the United States Navy. That day, U-123 under Kapitänleutnant Reinhard Hardegen, torpedoed and sank the British steamship Cyclops, inaugurating Paukenschlag (literally, "a strike on the kettledrum" and sometimes referred to in English as "Operation Drumbeat"). U-boat commanders found peacetime conditions prevailing along the coast: towns and cities were not blacked out and navigational buoys remained lit; shipping followed normal routines and "carried the normal lights". Paukenschlag had caught the United States unprepared.

Losses mounted rapidly. On 20 January 1942, Commander-in-Chief, United States Fleet (Cominch), Ernest J. King, sent a coded dispatch to Commander, Eastern Sea Frontier (CESF), requesting immediate consideration of the manning and fitting-out of "Queen" ships to be operated as an antisubmarine measure. The result was "Project LQ".

Five vessels were acquired and converted secretly at the Portsmouth Naval Shipyard, Kittery, Maine:

- the Boston beam trawler MS Wave, which briefly became the auxiliary minesweeper USS Eagle (AM-132) before becoming USS Captor (PYc-40),
- SS Evelyn and Carolyn, identical cargo vessels that became USS Asterion (AK-100) and USS Atik (AK-101) respectively (these hull numbers were actually duplicates of the USS Lynx and the USS Lyra respectively),
- the tanker SS Gulf Dawn, which became USS Big Horn (AO-45), and
- the schooner Irene Myrtle, which became USS Irene Forsyte (IX-93).

The careers of all five ships were almost entirely unsuccessful and very short, with USS Atik sunk on its first patrol with all hands on 26 March 1942. COMINCH strongly criticized the program and all Q-ships patrols ended in 1943.

American Q-ships also operated in the Pacific Ocean. One was USS Anacapa (AG-49), formerly the lumber transport Coos Bay, which was converted to Q-ship duty as project "Love William". Anacapa was not successful in engaging any enemy submarines, although she is believed to have damaged two friendly subs with depth charges when they were improperly operating in her vicinity. Anacapa was also withdrawn from Q-ship duty in 1943 and served out the remainder of World War II as an armed transport in the South Pacific and Aleutian Islands.

The US Navy did not use a consistent hull classification symbol for its Q-ships (AG, AK, AO, IX and PYc were all used). That and the unprecedented use of duplicate hull numbers for Asterion and Atik reflected the great secrecy attached to those ships.

== Proposed use against modern pirates ==
Attacks on merchant ships by pirates originating on the Somalia coast have brought suggestions from some security experts that Q-ships be used again to tempt pirates into attacking a well-defended ship.

== Survivors ==
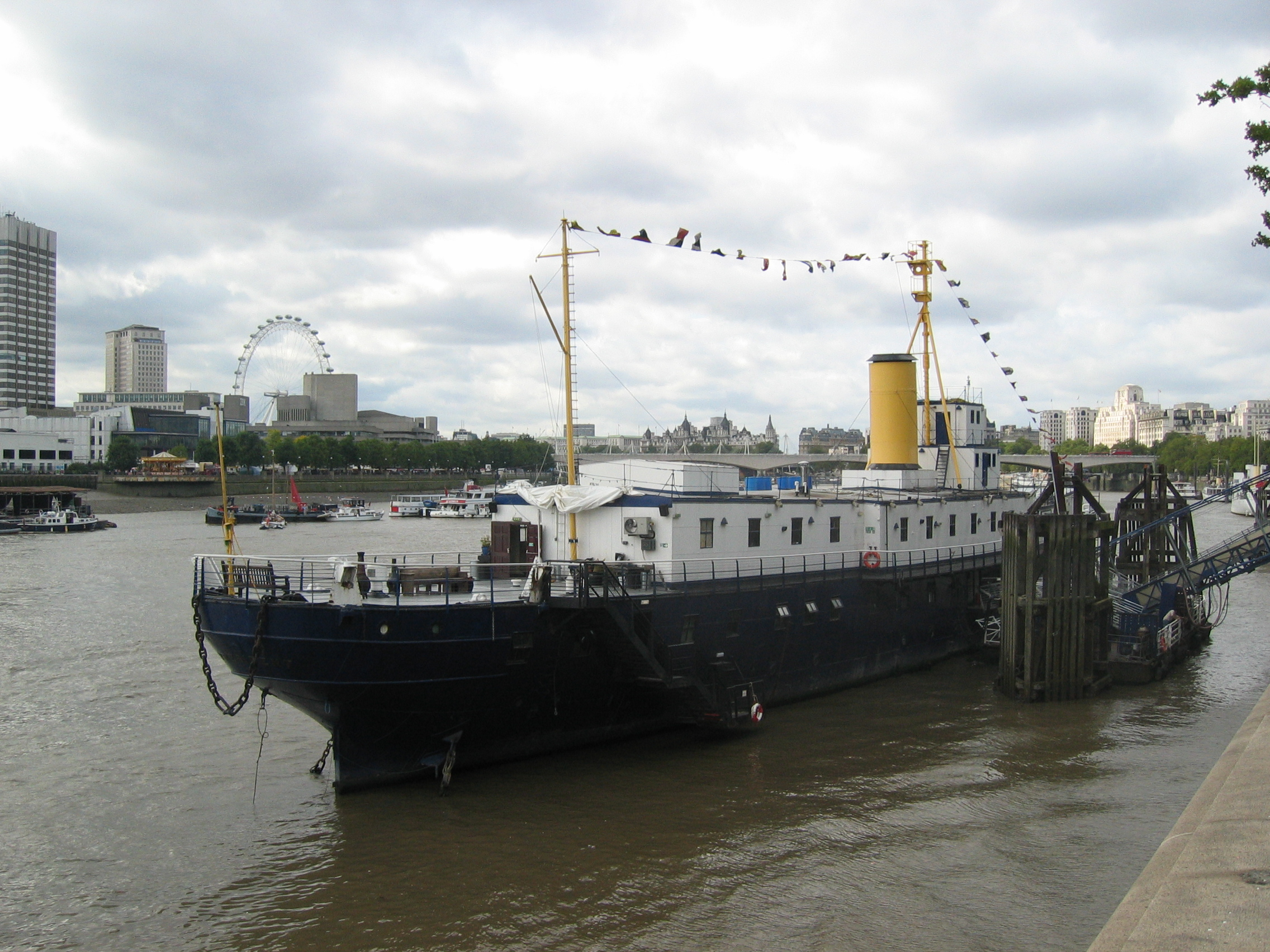
HMS President in the Thames

A surviving example of the Q-ships is HMS Saxifrage, a Flower-class sloop of the Anchusa group completed in 1918. She was renamed HMS President in 1922 and served as the London Division RNR drill ship until 1988, when she was sold privately and remained moored at King's Reach on the Thames until 2016, when her mooring was sold to Thames Water to facilitate the Thames Tideway Tunnel project. President was towed to Chatham Dockyard, on the River Medway, in Kent, where she is now abandoned. She was towed from the Dockyard to the breakers on July 17, 2026.

== Q-ships in fiction ==
The Alfred Noyes poem "Kilmeny" is about a Q-ship, a British trawler equipped with two deck guns that destroys a German submarine during World War I.

In Ernest Hemingway's novel Islands in the Stream, the main character, Thomas Hudson, commands a Q-ship for the US Navy around Cuba as he hunts the survivors of a sunken German U-boat.

In Edward L. Beach Jr.'s novel Run Silent, Run Deep, Japanese Q-ships make two appearances, with one surprising the Walrus and the second being attacked by the Eel in the final battle of the story.

Malcolm Lowry's novel Under the Volcano (1947) tells the story of Geoffrey Firmin, an alcoholic British consul in the small Mexican town of Quauhnahuac, on the Day of the Dead, 2 November 1938. Geoffrey Firmin reflects back to his time as a naval officer during World War I, when he was court-martialed and subsequently decorated for his actions aboard a Q-ship (the captured German officers disappeared and were allegedly burned alive in the boiler).

In the Clive Cussler book series Oregon Files, the main base of operations is a Q-ship, a converted lumber carrier. The crew are mercenaries and former US covert and military personnel who carry out missions around the world in support of US policy while earning their living performing mercenary operations.

The 1951 movie Operation Pacific features a battle with a Q-Ship by the fictional submarine USS Thunderfish, inspired by an encounter with an enemy ship by the USS Growler.

=== In science fiction ===
As with other naval concepts, the idea of a Q-ship has also been applied to space vessels in fictional works:

Q-ships feature prominently in David Weber's Honor Harrington series of books. Harrington destroys a Q-ship in the first novel, On Basilisk Station, and commands a squadron of Q-ships in the sixth novel, Honor Among Enemies. In the tenth book in the series, War of Honor, Thomas Bachfisch commands a pair of privately owned Q-ships.

In the January/February 2020 issue of Analog Science Fiction and Fact, Joel Richards has a short story, "Q-ship Militant".

In 1983, Q-ships were introduced to Steven Cole's tactical board wargame Starfleet Command in the magazine Nexus issue #4, which featured scenarios involving Q-ships in the game setting. It became a staple of the Star Fleet Battles universe. Q-ships in the gaming universe were warships built to mimic the appearance and electromagnetic signature of a civilian freighters but with hidden weapons, fake cargo, and robust shields. Their function was to lure pirates or enemy raiders into attacking them. Though chunky and slow, they possessed heavy shields and firepower. In the game, a Q-ship could not be detected until it powered up war devices that were not common to commercial vessels.

== See also ==
- Armed merchantmen – Merchant ship equipped with guns, usually for defensive purposes
- CAM ship – British merchant ships with onboard fighter aircraft
- Commerce raiding – Form of naval warfare
- East Indiaman – Merchant ships operating under charter or license to European East India companies
- False flag – Covert operation designed to deceive
- Harold Auten of Q-ship HMS Stock Force awarded VC
- Mary B Mitchell (Q-ship) – 1892 schooner converted to Q-ship
- Merchant aircraft carrier – British and Dutch civilian limited-purpose aircraft carriers used in WWII
- Merchant raiders – Warship type disguised as a non-combatant
- Tonnage war – Military strategy aimed at merchant shipping
