= On Basilisk Station =

1993 novel by David Weber

- First edition
- Author: David Weber
- Cover artist: Laurence Schwinger
- Language: English
- Series: Honor Harrington series
- Genre: Military science fiction
- Publisher: Baen Books
- Publication date: 1993
- Publication place: United States
- Media type: Print (Paperback) & E-book
- Pages: 422
- ISBN: 0-671-72163-1
- OCLC: 27773315
- Dewey Decimal: 813/.54 21
- LC Class: PS3573.E217 O5 1999
- Followed by: The Honor of the Queen

On Basilisk Station is a science fiction novel by American writer David Weber, first published in 1993. It is the first book in his Honor Harrington series, and follows Commander Honor Harrington and Her Majesty’s light cruiser Fearless during their assignment to the Basilisk system. Though Basilisk Station and the planet of Medusa have become a dumping ground for military officers from Honor's home star system of Manticore who are currently in disfavor, she is determined to discharge her duty regardless of the circumstances.

The story follows Honor and her crew as they deal with the responsibilities of their assignment. When their duty leads them to discover events that would lead to an invasion of Medusa, they have no choice but to act.

== Plot summary ==
The Star Kingdom of Manticore is gearing up for a likely war with Haven. However, some political factions do not believe that the war is inevitable and therefore hinder the Government's plans, including the necessary reinforcement of Basilisk. The Government, whose majority is slim, has little choice than to acquiesce and leave Basilisk almost undefended—until Honor Harrington is assigned there.

The People's Republic of Haven finds that its economy is increasingly strained due to its welfare state and massive military budget, thus forcing their leaders to end their standoff with Manticore by any means necessary. Possession of Basilisk and its wormhole terminus would give Haven a strategic advantage over the Star Kingdom.

=== Prologue ===
Sidney Harris, the Hereditary President of the People's Republic of Haven, discusses the economic and military situation with his cabinet. Secretary of the Economy Walter Frankel presents the latest grim economic projections, blaming the naval budget. Admiral Amos Parnell retorts that the fleet is required to hold on to recently acquired star systems, and blames the bleak economic situation on the increases in the Basic Living Stipend instead. Frankel responds that the BLS increases are the only thing keeping the mob in check. Neither man is willing to budge, and both concede that additional income is required and, per the DuQuesne Plan the source of this income should be new conquests. Moving southwards towards Erewhon is rejected as too dangerous as the Solarian League could see it as a threat. Moving westwards towards the Silesian Confederacy is seen as the better option, but the Basilisk system is in the way, and the Basilisk system contains a terminus of the Manticore Wormhole Junction. The decision is made to take over the Basilisk system and Admiral Parnell is tasked with drawing up plans to that effect.

=== The story ===
Commander Honor Harrington, freshly graduated from the Royal Manticoran Navy's Advanced Tactical Course, assumes command of the light cruiser HMS Fearless, as it completes an extensive weapons refit, discovering, to her chagrin, that its normal complement of weapons has been stripped, replaced primarily by a "grav lance" commissioned by Admiral Sonja Hemphill. While Harrington uses it to perform spectacularly in the first round of a series of war games, her ship is summarily crushed in all following ones, and for the same simple reason: the grav lance is devastatingly effective at close range, but Fearless has neither the armour nor the other weaponry needed to close with an enemy ship.

In order to cover up the embarrassing failure of her experiment, Admiral Hemphill (a cousin of Sir Edward Janáček, First Lord of the Admiralty), has Fearless reassigned to picket duty on Basilisk Station, a remote outpost of Manticore. At Medusa, Harrington finds Basilisk's picket fleet commanded by Captain Lord Pavel Young, a spoiled noble whose lacklustre career is due in part to his attempt to rape Honor at the Academy several years earlier, and who has set up a ploy to ruin Honor's career. Taking his heavy cruiser Warlock off to Manticore for a "desperately needed" refit, Young leaves Honor and Fearless as the sole RMN unit responsible for the Basilisk system's security, a duty almost impossible to perform with a single ship.

With hard work and clever use of resources, Honor soon has revitalised the RMN’s presence in Basilisk, capturing several prizes on charges of smuggling, and turning around the abysmal opinion of the fleet held by system personnel. During this, Honor learns of a long-standing drug ring catering to the Medusan aborigines, a three-legged sentient species at a Bronze Age technology level. The drug, mekoha, has a place in Medusan religion for its hallucinogenic properties, but can also be used to incite them to furious violence. Fearless's investigations reveal that humans have been synthesizing it on the planet for distribution to the nomadic members of the species. A raid on this drug lab also reveals the presence of further contamination: breech-loading flintlock rifles designed specifically for Medusan use, and crude enough for the Medusans to manufacture themselves.

Whilst embroiled in this plot and trying to uncover who might be behind it, Honor Harrington becomes a figure of political note for the first time. In order to capitalize on Honor's accomplishments and discredit the conservatives in the government who are pushing for the Kingdom's withdrawal from Basilisk, a group of officers and politicians conspire to delay the completion of Warlock's refit and keep Young away from his post for as long as possible.

Harrington and her crew get to the bottom of the sprawling plot: Haven, intent on conquering Medusa for their own, have arranged for a coup de main against Basilisk. By whipping some of the Medusan nomads into a killing frenzy that will sweep across the planet in a haze of blood, they can claim legal pretext to swoop in and take control of the system before Manticore can respond, as a preamble to invading Manticore itself

The ground force of Medusans is easily dealt with by Fearless's complement of Marines. However, the other half of the plan is the Sirius, a Havenite Q-ship disguised as a freighter with the task of signalling the Havenite fleet. Harrington cripples the one other Havenite ship in orbit (a diplomatic courier) and sends Fearless in pursuit of Sirius, notifying Manticore of the impending invasion. What follows is a grueling battle in which Fearless is crippled, but Sirius' captain is sufficiently vexed by the damage inflicted by the small light cruiser that he turns Sirius about to ensure that she is destroyed. In doing so, he inadvertently brings Sirius within range of Fearless' grav lance, and Sirius is destroyed.

Manticore reinforces the system in time to greet the “visiting” Haven task force, who leave after a suitable interval to inform Haven of failure. After extensive repairs just to get her mauled ship underway, Honor returns to the Star Kingdom to a hero’s welcome. Promoted twice to Captain of the List, Honor is disappointed when the light cruiser is retired from service, but instead, she is given command of a newly constructed Star Knight-class heavy cruiser, re-christened as the new Fearless.

== Characters ==
In addition to Honor Harrington, the story includes the first appearances of Alistair McKeon, Hamish Alexander, Lord Pavel Young, Andreas Venizelos, Rafael Cardones, Estelle Matsuko, Paul Tankersley, Mercedes Brigham, Prescott Tremaine, Klaus Hauptman, and Allen Summervale.

== Reviews ==
- Review by Don D'Ammassa (1993) in Science Fiction Chronicle #162, May 1993
- Review by Carolyn Cushman (1993) in Locus #389, June 1993
- Review by John C. Bunnell (1993) in Dragon Magazine, September 1993
- Review by Norm Hartman (1997) in Space & Time, Summer 1997
- Review [French] by Stéphane Manfrédo (1999) in Galaxies #14
- Review by Stephen Deas (2000) in Vector 214
- Review by Stephen Theaker (2009) in Theaker's Quarterly Fiction #29

The book was reviewed for the Polish fanzine Esensja by Magda Fabrykowska.

== Analysis ==
Suanna Davis discussed the book as one of the examples in her article on Representations of Rape in Speculative Fiction, in the context of Honor Harrington's backstory as survivor of an attempted rape from her days as a naval cadet.
