= USS Anacapa =

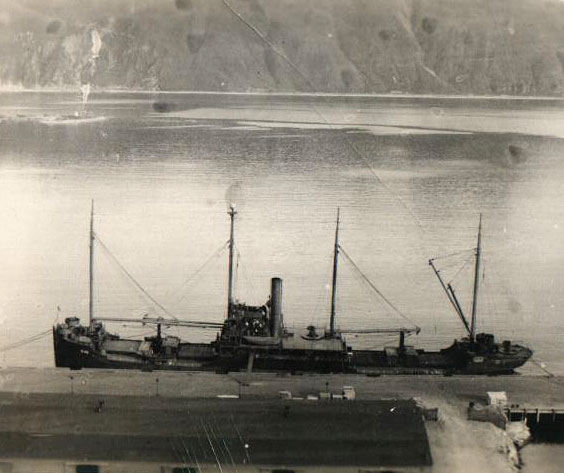
- USS Anacapa (AG-49) docked in Alaska

History

United States
- Name: Coos Bay (original name as a transport ship for the Coos Bay Lumber Company)
- Launched: 15 February 1919
- Completed: May 1919
- Acquired: 20 June 1942
- Commissioned: 31 August 1942
- Decommissioned: 21 March 1946
- Renamed: USS Anacapa (AG-49)
- Reclassified: Miscellaneous Ship, AG
- Stricken: 12 April 1946
- Fate: Transferred to the Maritime Commission, refitted and saw further service as a merchant ship. Wrecked and sunk in the Columbia River, 1964.

General characteristics
- Displacement: 7,500 tons (full load)
- Length: 336 ft (102 m)
- Beam: 50 ft (15 m)
- Draft: 20 ft (6.1 m)
- Speed: 9 knots max.
- Complement: 155
- Armament: 2 × 4-inch/50-caliber guns; 2 × 3-inch/50-caliber guns; 5 × 20mm Oerlikon cannons; 1 depth charge projector; (all concealed)

USS Anacapa (AG-49) was a Q-ship in the United States Navy. She was named for Anacapa, an island near the coast of California.

== Construction ==
The ship was built by Pusey & Jones Corp. in 1919 at Wilmington, Delaware. She was operated by a number of different owners under a number of different names including Castle Town (1919), Lumbertown (1936) and Coos Bay (1942). Before acquisition by the Navy, she was being operated as a lumber ship by the Coos Bay Lumber Co. She was acquired by the Navy and converted for naval service as a Q-ship and placed in commission as Anacapa (AG-49) on 31 August 1942. Anacapa was converted as project "Love William" under which she would appear to be a merchant vessel while actually carrying concealed weapons to attack enemy submarines.

== World War II Pacific Ocean operations ==
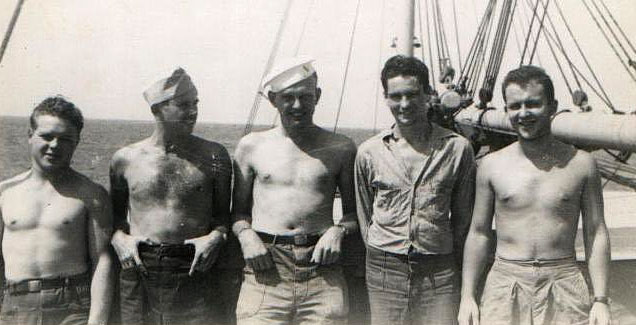
Yeomen and storekeepers of the USS Anacapa in shockingly non-regulation attire typical of Q-ship duty

The ship was crewed by Navy personnel, but all carried merchant marine papers and dressed like merchant seamen. Anacapa cruised off the west coast of the US acting as a decoy to attract enemy submarine attack. Like other Q-ships, she carried empty oil drums and large logs both to simulate cargo and to provide additional buoyancy if torpedoed. Anacapa was not successful in engaging any Japanese submarines. However, she rescued 38 survivors of the torpedoed tanker Larry Doheney near Mendocino, California in October, 1943. It is also believed that she damaged two friendly submarines with depth charges when they were improperly operating in her vicinity.

"Her skipper, Comdr. Albert M. Wright of San Diego, recalled several occasions when subchasers, not in on the secret, came alongside to warn that she was in dangerous waters and ordered her to follow them to port. 'After dark or in bad visibility,' Wright said, 'we would reverse course and intentionally lose them. It was a dirty trick, and I hope commanding officers weren't too severe on their deck officers when they learned they had lost us.'"

Late in 1943 she was relieved of Q-ship duty and served out the rest of the war as an armed transport, based first at Pearl Harbor and later at Anchorage. Her ports of call included Tarawa, Saipan, Guam, Ulithi, Truk, Nukufetau, Adak, Attu, and Dutch Harbor.

The ship was originally built with a relatively shallow draft and flat bottom to allow her to navigate far upstream in the rivers of Oregon and Washington in order to load lumber and logs. This made for a rough ride in the open ocean, but it also proved quite valuable in the island-hopping campaign in the South Pacific as Anacapa's shallow draft allowed her to deliver cargo to islands without improved ports. She was often the first ship in to re-supply Marines on Pacific islands as soon as major combat had ceased.

== Decommissioning ==
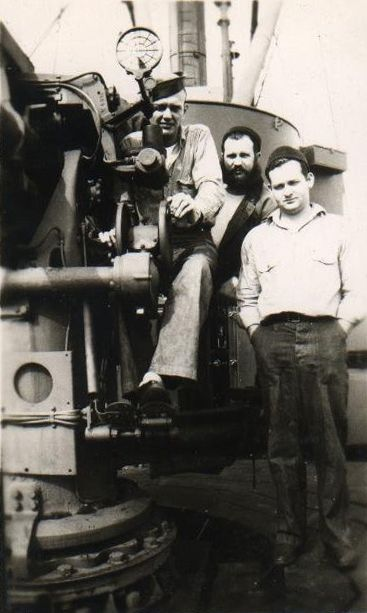
Crew and 4" gun mount. These guns were disguised as crates when not in use.

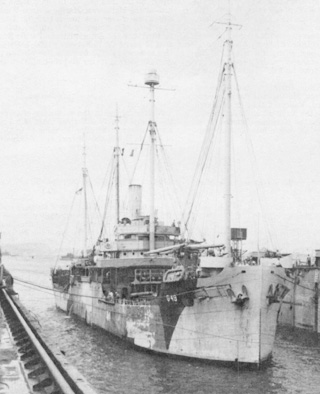
Hinged flaps aft of the anchor hid 3" guns.

Anacapa returned to San Francisco in March, 1946, was decommissioned, transferred to the Maritime Commission, and saw further service as a merchant ship. Initially, she was given back her old name of Coos Bay (1946), but was later renamed George Olson in 1947. She was wrecked and sunk under that name while hauling lumber in the Columbia River on 30 January 1964, although the wreck is sometimes confused with the wreck of the George L. Olson, a wood-hulled lumber vessel that sunk in the Columbia River in 1944.

The USS Anacapa was awarded the American Campaign Medal - Asiatic-Pacific Campaign Medal - World War II Victory Medal

== Bibliography ==
- Beyer, Edward F. & Beyer, Kenneth M. (1991). "U. S. Navy Mystery Ships". Warship International. XXVIII (4). International Naval Research Organization: 322–372. ISSN 0043-0374.

- USS Anacapa entry in Dictionary of American Naval Fighting Ships
