= Fearless-class landing platform dock =

Royal Navy vessel

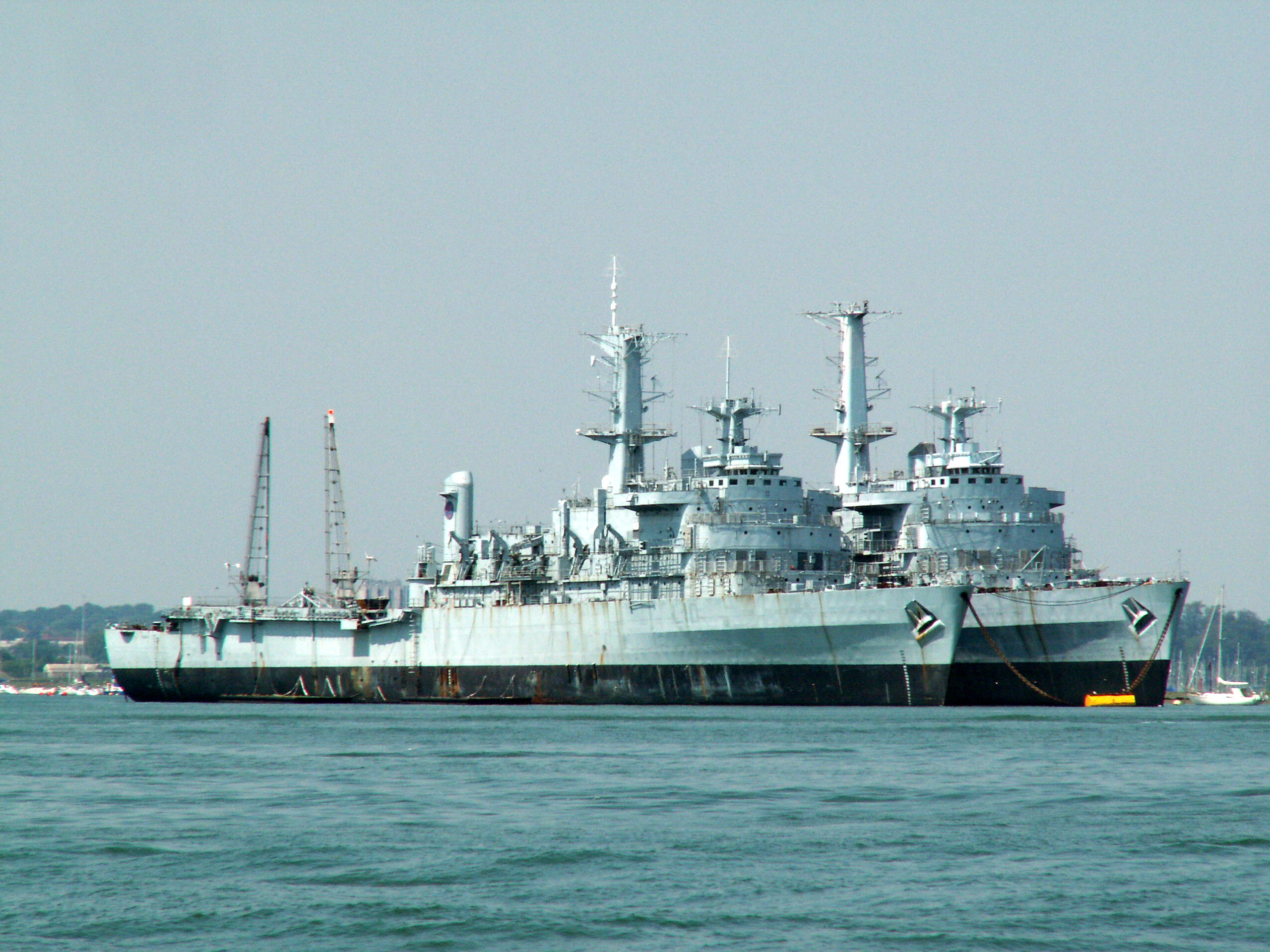
- HMS Fearless and HMS Intrepid

Class overview
- Name: Fearless class
- Operators: Royal Navy
- Succeeded by: Albion class
- In commission: 1965–2002
- Completed: 2
- Retired: 2

General characteristics
- Type: Landing platform dock
- Displacement: 11,060 long tons (11,237 t) standard 12,120 long tons (12,314 t) full load 16,950 long tons (17,222 t) ballasted and dock flooded
- Length: 158.5 m (520 ft)
- Beam: 24.4 m (80 ft)
- Draught: 6.3 m (21 ft)
- Propulsion: 2 steam turbines; 22,000 shp (16,000 kW)
- Speed: 22 knots (41 km/h)
- Boats & landing craft carried: 4 medium landing craft (in dock); 4 light landing craft (on davits)
- Capacity: Up to 700 troops; 15 tanks; 27 vehicles
- Complement: 580
- Armament: 2 anti-aircraft guns; 4x4 Seacat SAM (originally fit); 2x Phalanx CIWS (added post-Falklands War)
- Aircraft carried: 5 helicopters

The Fearless-class landing platform docks were the first purpose-built amphibious assault vessels in the Royal Navy. The class comprised two ships: HMS Fearless and HMS Intrepid.

Designed as landing platform docks (LPD), they were designed to transport and land troops by sea either using Landing Craft Utility (LCU) or helicopters. As constructed, the ships have an internal dock that is accessed via the stern—while in port, vehicles can drive up the stern ramp and into the internal vehicle decks. At sea, the ships could partially submerge themselves at the stern, flooding the internal dock and allowing landing craft to come right up to the edge of the vehicle deck.

Each ship carried four LCUs in the stern dock, with four smaller landing craft on davits on the superstructure. They provided accommodation for up to 400 troops, which could be increased to 700, if no vehicles were carried.

== Service ==
Intrepid was put into extended reserve in 1991, effectively removing her from active service. While in this state, she was used as a source of spares to maintain Fearless. Intrepid was finally withdrawn from service in August 1999. Fearless was kept in service, and continued to be deployed in concert with HMS Ocean until the end of 2002, when she too was withdrawn from service, ready for the Albion class to enter the fleet. The Fearless class were the last steam-powered surface vessels in Royal Navy service.

== Ships ==
Pennant	Name	(a) Hull builder (b) Main machinery manufacturers	Laid down	Launched	Accepted into service	Commissioned	Estimated building cost
L10	Fearless	(a) Harland & Wolff Ltd, Belfast (b) English Electric Co Ltd, Rugby (steam turbines) (b) David Brown & Co Ltd, Huddersfield (gearing)	25 July 1962	19 December 1963	November 1965	25 November 1965	£11,250,000
L11	Intrepid	(a) John Brown & Co Ltd, Clydebank (b) English Electric Co Ltd, Rugby (steam turbines) (b) David Brown & Co Ltd, Huddersfield (gearing)	19 December 1962	25 June 1964	March 1967	11 March 1967	£10,300,000

== See also ==
Equivalent landing ships of the same era

- Anchorage class
- Ouragan class
