= SM UB-4 =

Type UB I submarine of the German Imperial Navy

- UB-4 sometime in 1915

History

German Empire
- Name: UB-4
- Ordered: 15 November 1914
- Builder: Germaniawerft, Kiel
- Yard number: 242
- Laid down: 3 November 1914
- Launched: March 1915
- Commissioned: 23 March 1915
- Fate: Sunk, 15 August 1915

General characteristics
- Class & type: Type UB I submarine
- Displacement: 127 t (125 long tons) surfaced; 142 t (140 long tons) submerged
- Length: 28.10 m (92 ft 2 in) (o/a)
- Beam: 3.15 m (10 ft 4 in)
- Draught: 3.03 m (9 ft 11 in)
- Propulsion: 1 × propeller shaft; 1 × Daimler 4-cylinder diesel engine, 59 bhp (44 kW); 1 × Siemens-Schuckert electric motor, 119 shp (89 kW)
- Speed: 6.47 knots (11.98 km/h; 7.45 mph) surfaced; 5.51 knots (10.20 km/h; 6.34 mph) submerged
- Range: 1,650 nmi (3,060 km; 1,900 mi) at 5 knots (9.3 km/h; 5.8 mph) surfaced; 45 nmi (83 km; 52 mi) at 4 knots (7.4 km/h; 4.6 mph)
- Test depth: 50 metres (160 ft)
- Complement: 14
- Armament: 2 × 45 cm (17.7 in) bow torpedo tubes; 2 × torpedoes; 1 × 8 mm (0.31 in) machine gun
- Notes: 33-second diving time

Service record
- Commanders: Oblt. Karl Gross (Note: Karl Gross' name is also spelled as Karl Groß in some sources.); 23 March – 15 August 1915
- Operations: 14 patrols
- Victories: 4 merchant ships sunk (10,942 GRT)

Seiner Majestät UB-4 was a German Type UB I submarine (U-boat) in the German Imperial Navy (German: Kaiserliche Marine) during World War I. She was sunk by a British Q-ship disguised as a fishing smack in August 1915.

UB-4 was ordered in October 1914 and was laid down at the Germaniawerft shipyard in Kiel in November. UB-4 was a little more than 28 metres (92 ft) in length and displaced between 127 and 142 tonnes (125 and 140 long tons), depending on whether surfaced or submerged. She carried two torpedoes for her two bow torpedo tubes and was also armed with a deck-mounted machine gun. UB-4 was broken into sections and shipped by rail to Antwerp for reassembly. She was launched and commissioned as SM UB-4 in March 1915. (Note: "SM" stands for "Seiner Majestät" (English: His Majesty's) and combined with the U for Unterseeboot would be translated as His Majesty's Submarine.)

UB-4 conducted the first sortie of the Flanders Flotilla in April, during which she sank the Belgian Relief ship Harpalyce, the first ship credited to the flotilla. She sank three more ships from mid-April to mid-August. On 15 August, UB-4 surfaced near the British Q-ship Inverlyon and was sunk by gunfire from the sailing vessel. None of UB-4's 14 crewmen survived the attack.

== Design and construction ==
After the German Army's rapid advance along the North Sea coast in the earliest stages of World War I, the German Imperial Navy found itself without suitable submarines that could be operated in the narrow and shallow environment off Flanders. Project 34, a design effort begun in mid-August 1914, produced the Type UB I design: a small submarine that could be shipped by rail to a port of operations and quickly assembled. Constrained by railroad size limitations, the UB I design called for a boat about 28 metres (92 ft) long and displacing about 125 tonnes (123 long tons) with two torpedo tubes. (Note: A further refinement of the design—replacing the torpedo tubes with mine chutes but changing little else—evolved into the Type UC I coastal minelaying submarine. See: Miller, p. 458.) UB-4 was part of the initial allotment of eight submarines—numbered UB-1 to UB-8—ordered on 15 October from Germaniawerft of Kiel, just shy of two months after planning for the class began.

UB-4 was laid down by Germaniawerft in Kiel on 3 November. As built, UB-4 was 28.10 metres (92 ft 2 in) long, 3.15 metres (10 ft 4 in) abeam, and had a draft of 3.03 metres (10 ft). She had a single 59-brake-horsepower (44 kW) Daimler 4-cylinder diesel engine for surface travel, and a single 119-shaft-horsepower (89 kW) Siemens-Schuckert electric motor for underwater travel, both attached to a single propeller shaft. Her top speeds were 6.47 knots (11.98 km/h; 7.45 mph), surfaced, and 5.51 knots (10.20 km/h; 6.34 mph), submerged. At more moderate speeds, she could sail up to 1,650 nautical miles (3,060 km; 1,900 mi) on the surface before refueling, and up to 45 nautical miles (83 km; 52 mi) submerged before recharging her batteries. Like all boats of the class, UB-4 was rated to a diving depth of 50 metres (160 ft), and could completely submerge in 33 seconds.

UB-4 was armed with two 45-centimeter (17.7 in) torpedoes in two bow torpedo tubes. She was also outfitted for a single 8-millimeter (0.31 in) machine gun on deck. UB-4's standard complement consisted of one officer and thirteen enlisted men.

After work on UB-4 was complete at the Germaniwerft yard, UB-4 was readied for rail shipment. The process of shipping a UB I boat involved breaking the submarine down into what was essentially a knock down kit. Each boat was broken into approximately fifteen pieces and loaded onto eight railway flatcars. In early 1915, the sections of UB-4 were shipped to Antwerp for assembly in what was typically a two- to three-week process. After UB-4 was assembled and launched sometime in March, she was loaded on a barge and taken through canals to Bruges where she underwent trials.

== Service career ==
The submarine was commissioned into the German Imperial Navy as SM UB-4 on 23 March under the command of Oberleutnant zur See Karl Gross, a 29-year-old first-time U-boat commander. (Note: Gross was in the Navy's April 1905 cadet class with 36 other future U-boat captains, including Hermann von Fischel, Carl-Siegfried Ritter von Georg, Kurt Hartwig, and Hans von Mellenthin. See: Helgason, Guðmundur. "WWI Officer Crews: Crew 4/05". German and Austrian U-boats of World War I - Kaiserliche Marine - Uboat.net.) UB-4 soon joined the other UB I boats then comprising the Flanders Flotilla (German: U-boote des Marinekorps U-Flotille Flandern), which had been organized on 29 March. When UB-4 joined the flotilla, Germany was in the midst of its first submarine offensive, begun in February. During this campaign, enemy vessels in the German-defined war zone (German: Kriegsgebiet), which encompassed all waters around the United Kingdom (including the English Channel), were to be sunk. Vessels of neutral countries were not to be attacked unless they definitively could be identified as enemy vessels operating under a false flag.

UB-4 kicked off operations for the new flotilla when she departed on her first patrol on 9 April. The following day, she sank the first ship credited to the Flanders Flotilla. The 5,940 GRT British-flagged Harpalyce, which had been chartered by the American Commission for Relief in Belgium, was headed for Norfolk, Virginia, United States, in ballast after delivering relief supplies to Rotterdam. UB-4 came upon the steamer between Harwich and the Hook of Holland and pulled to within about 100 yards (91 m). Despite the fact that the ship had a pass of safe-conduct from Germany, was marked with the words "Belgian Relief" on her side, and was flying a white flag with the same wording, Gross torpedoed the vessel without warning. Harpalyce sank in about five minutes, which allowed no time to launch any of the lifeboats. The Dutch steamers Elisabeth and Constance, and the American steamer Ruby picked up survivors. Herbert Hoover, head of the relief committee, reported that his organization's charter of the ship ended after delivery of the cargo in Rotterdam, but expressed disbelief that the ship could have been the victim of a torpedo attack, given the "distinct assurance" that ships engaged in the relief effort "would not be molested". Harpalyce's master and 14 others from the 44-man crew died in the attack. Harpalyce was the largest ship sunk by UB-4 during her career.

UB-4's followed up the sinking of Harpalyce by sinking the Greek ship Ellispontos, a steamer of 2,989 gross register tons (GRT). Ellispontos was en route to Montevideo from Amsterdam when sunk by Gross and UB-4 on 17 April. Although German U-boats sank over 100,000 tons of shipping in each of May and June, UB-4 did not contribute to those totals. She did add one ship to the 98,000-ton tally for July when she sank the Belgian ship Princesse Marie Jose and her load of coal on 29 July. The 1,954 GRT steamer had sailed from Dunston and was headed to Bordeaux when sunk 1.5 nautical miles (2.8 km; 1.7 mi) from the Shipwash Lightship off Harwich.

=== Sinking ===
Action of 15 August 1915
- Part of U-boat Campaign of World War I
Date	August 15, 1915
Location	Off the coast of Great Yarmouth, England 52°42′N 2°18′E
Result	British victory

Belligerents
Imperial German Navy	Royal Navy

Commanders and leaders
Karl Gross †	Ernest Martin Jehan

Strength
UB-4, 14 crewmembers	Inverlyon, unknown number of crew

Casualties and losses
14 KIA, UB-4 sunk	none

On 14 August, the 59 GRT British fishing smack Bona Fide was stopped by a U-boat, boarded, and sunk with explosives 35 nautical miles (65 km; 40 mi) east-northeast of Lowestoft. According to the website Uboat.net, this attack was likely by UB-4, because she was operating in the area on her fourteenth patrol. Regardless of the identity of Bona Fide's attacker, UB-4 did approach a group of smacks in the vicinity the next day, but unbeknownst to UB-4's commander, Gross, one of the fishing vessels was actually a British decoy ship. (Note: Perkins reports the date of the encounter as Sunday, 16 August 1915, but 16 August 1915 was actually a Monday. Messimer (p. 129), Gibson and Prendergast (pp. 50–51), and Uboat.net (Helgason, Guðmundur. "WWI U-boats: UB 4". German and Austrian U-boats of World War I - Kaiserliche Marine - Uboat.net.) all report the date of the encounter as 15 August 1915.)

The decoy or Q-ship was His Majesty's Armed Smack Inverlyon, a smack that had been outfitted with a concealed 3-pounder (47 mm) gun. Around 20:20, UB-4 drew within 30 yards (27 m) of Inverlyon and Gross, on the conning tower of UB-4, shouted out commands to Inverlyon's crew in German. After waiting until the right moment, Ernest Jehan, a Royal Navy gunner in command of Inverlyon, ordered the White Ensign raised and gave the command to open fire. A burst of three rounds from the 3-pounder scored hits on the conning tower, the second destroying part of the bridge and sending Gross into the water. UB-4, with no one at the helm, drifted behind Inverlyon, and when clear, the 3-pounder fired another six shots into the hull of UB-4 at point blank range. All the while small arms fire from Inverlyon's crew peppered the submarine. The U-boat began going down by the bow, becoming nearly vertical before disappearing below the surface. A member of Inverlyon's crew attempted the rescue of one crewman from UB-4, but was unable to reach him before he went under, meeting the same fate as the other thirteen crewmen.

As UB-4 went down, her hulk fouled the Inverlyon's nets—which had been deployed to keep up the appearance of a real fishing boat—essentially anchoring Inverlyon in place. The Q-ship's crew, not having a wireless set on board, sent word of the encounter with another smack, and followed up by releasing messenger pigeons the following morning, requesting instructions on what to do with UB-4. The thought of salvaging the snagged U-boat was rejected, so the nets were cut, freeing UB-4 to sink to the bottom. UB-4's wreck lies at position 52°43′N 2°18′E. Jehan was awarded the Distinguished Service Cross for the sinking of UB-4, and the crewmen of Inverlyon split the submarine bounty paid by the Admiralty. (Note: There is no mention of the amount of the bounty for sinking UB-4, but the Admiralty bounties were typically £5 per crewman on the submarine, or £70 in the case of UB-4. See: Messimer, pp. 158, 170, 222, for examples of the £5 per capita bounty.)

== Summary of raiding history ==
Ships sunk or damaged by SM UB-4
Date	Name	Nationality	Tonnage (Note: Tonnages are in gross register tons)	Fate
10 April 1915	Harpalyce	United Kingdom	5,940	Sunk
17 April 1915	Ellispontos	Greece	2,989	Sunk
29 July 1915	Princesse Marie Jose	Belgium	1,954	Sunk
14 August 1915	Bona Fide	United Kingdom	59	Sunk
		Total:	10,942	

== Bibliography ==
- Bendert, Harald (2000). Die UB-Boote der Kaiserlichen Marine, 1914-1918. Einsätze, Erfolge, Schicksal (in German). Hamburg: Verlag E.S. Mittler & Sohn GmbH. ISBN 3-8132-0713-7.
- Gröner, Erich; Jung, Dieter; Maass, Martin (1991). U-boats and Mine Warfare Vessels. German Warships 1815–1945. Vol. 2. Translated by Thomas, Keith; Magowan, Rachel. London: Conway Maritime Press. ISBN 0-85177-593-4.
- Gardiner, Robert; Gray, Randal, eds. (1985). Conway's All the World's Fighting Ships 1906–1921. Annapolis, Maryland: Naval Institute Press. ISBN 978-0-87021-907-8. OCLC 12119866.
- Gibson, R. H.; Maurice Prendergast (2003) [1931]. The German Submarine War, 1914–1918. Annapolis, Maryland: Naval Institute Press. ISBN 9781591143147. OCLC 52924732.
- Karau, Mark D. (2003). Wielding the Dagger: the MarineKorps Flandern and the German War Effort, 1914–1918. Westport, Connecticut: Praeger. ISBN 978-0-313-32475-8. OCLC 51204317.
- Messimer, Dwight R. (2002). Verschollen: World War I U-boat losses. Annapolis, Maryland: Naval Institute Press. ISBN 978-1-55750-475-3. OCLC 231973419.
- Miller, David (2002). The Illustrated Directory of Submarines of the World. St. Paul, Minnesota: MBI Pub. Co. ISBN 978-0-7603-1345-9. OCLC 50208951.
- Tarrant, V. E. (1989). The U-Boat Offensive: 1914–1945. Annapolis, Maryland: Naval Institute Press. ISBN 978-0-87021-764-7. OCLC 20338385.
- Williamson, Gordon (2002). U-boats of the Kaiser's Navy. Oxford: Osprey. ISBN 978-1-84176-362-0. OCLC 48627495.
