= USS Irene Forsyte =

Schooner of the United States Navy

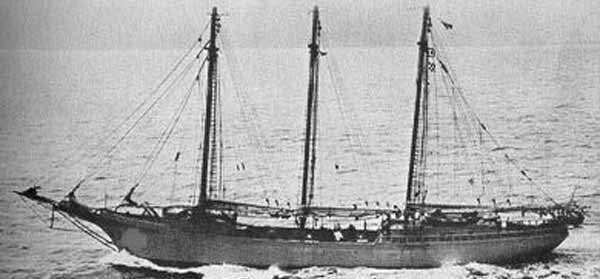

History

Canada
- Name: McLean Clan
- Namesake: Clan MacLean
- Owner: H. W. Adams
- Port of registry: Lunenburg, Nova Scotia, 1920–1929; Windsor, Nova Scotia 1929-c. 1932
- Builder: McLean Construction Company
- Launched: 1920
- Identification: Official number: 141697; Code Letters TQDK
- Fate: Sold to American owners in 1930s

United States
- Name: USS Irene Forsyte
- Laid down: 1920
- Launched: 1922
- Acquired: by purchase, 16 November 1942
- Commissioned: 26 August 1943
- Decommissioned: 16 December 1943
- Reclassified: IX-93, 7 December 1942
- Stricken: 22 December 1944
- Fate: Sold, 18 October 1945; Sunk 21 December 1951

General characteristics
- Type: Q-ship
- Tonnage: 283 GRT
- Length: 144 ft (44 m)
- Beam: 27 ft 7 in (8.41 m)
- Sail plan: Tern Schooner
- Speed: 13 knots (24 km/h; 15 mph)
- Armament: 1 × 4 in (100 mm) gun; 1 × 40 mm gun; 2 × 20 mm guns; 1 × Mousetrap anti-submarine rocket

USS Irene Forsyte (IX-93) was a three masted schooner originally built as MacLean Clan which was briefly converted to a Q-ship, of the United States Navy.

== In commercial service ==
The three-masted schooner MacLean Clan was built in 1920 by the MacLean Construction Company, Mahone Bay, Nova Scotia for H.W. Adams of Lunenburg, Nova Scotia. Built at the end of the era of three masted merchant schooners, she was one of two schooners built by MacLean construction in 1920, the other being the auxiliary tern schooner Cote Nord. Maclean Clan worked in the coastal trade into the 1930s. She had an auxiliary engine installed in 1926 and was sold and re-registered in Windsor, Nova Scotia in 1929. In the early 1930s she was purchased by Captain Thomas Antle. Renamed Irene Myrtle, the schooner barely survived the tough trade conditions of that time and was in poor condition by the end of the decade. Given a new lease on life by the increased shipping traffic provoked by the war, she served in the coal trade between New England and Nova Scotia into 1942. That summer, while the ship was loading coal at New London, Connecticut, Captain Antle died and the ship was eventually put up for sale.

== Acquired by the US Navy ==
At this time, the U.S. Navy began looking for a smaller coastal vessel to serve as a Q-ship, complementing the larger decoy ships Big Horn, Asterion, and Atik. Purchased on 16 November 1942, for about US$12,000, the schooner was renamed Irene Forsyte and given hull designation symbol IX-93 on 7 December. She was delivered to the Thames Shipyard of New London, Connecticut, for conversion. Fitted with new engines, quick-firing armament, as well as concealed radar and sonar equipment, the auxiliary was commissioned 26 August 1943.

== Service history ==
Based on the experience of Q-ships during World War I, it was hoped Irene Forsyte, with her relatively heavy armament concealed, could lure German submarines into close quarters on the surface and sink them with gunfire. Success in the venture would require a good disguise. After a volunteer crew sailed the schooner from New London on 29 September 1943, she changed her name and flag to that of a Portuguese Grand Banks fishing schooner. The crew also further concealed the guns and altered her rigging and profile. The disguised Q-ship then stood southeast in hopes of encountering enemy submarines.

Originally, the Navy planned to use the vessel off the "Trinidad corner" where U-boats had congregated and where several schooners had been attacked. However, by the time she was ready for sea, the situation had changed and she was given orders to sail on or about 26 September for Recife, Brazil, along the Maury Track.

In the early morning hours of 4 October 1943, a dispatch from Irene Forsyte reported that she was hove to at approximately 38°N, 66°W (near Bermuda). The schooner's seams had opened during the course of a heavy storm and her pumps were just able to keep ahead of the flooding. The message further stated that the condition might become serious if the heavy weather continued; permission was requested to proceed to Bermuda for repairs. Commander-in-Chief, U.S. Atlantic Fleet (CINCLANT), ordered two tugs to proceed to the scene and render assistance. Later in the day, however, Irene Forsyte reported that no assistance was needed and that she was proceeding to Bermuda. The tugs were recalled. She anchored in Hamilton Harbour, Bermuda, and was reconditioned.

Immediately a Board of Investigation convened to determine why the vessel had been permitted to go to sea in such obviously unseaworthy condition. In commenting on the report of the Naval Inspector General, the Commander-in-Chief, United States Fleet, Admiral Ernest J. King wrote:

The conversion of USS Irene Forsyte is an instance of misguided conception and misdirected zeal, which, coupled with inefficiency resulting from lack of supervision by competent authority; has cost the government nearly half a million dollars in money and a serious waste of effort. In addition, much valuable material that can ultimately be used has been frozen for the better part of one year. The facts and circumstances responsible therefor are set forth in detail in the enclosures.

I recognize that the actions of the officers were, in general, motivated by a desire to assist in the war effort. However, it appears to be a fact that some of the officers concerned took advantage of the broad authority that was granted in the interests of secrecy to obtain equipment that did not contribute to the military value of the vessel. Furthermore, the failure to ascertain, prior to or during conversion, that the vessel was unseaworthy is an indication of professional incompetence on the part of the officers concerned. The Commander, Eastern Sea Frontiers, and the Commandant, Third Naval District, after such further investigation as they may deem necessary, will take appropriate corrective and disciplinary action. Disposal of the vessel has been provided for in other correspondence.

The practice of granting to Frontier Commanders and District Commandants uncontrolled authority to implement projects of this nature has been discontinued.

The schooner arrived New York 8 November 1943 and, after an inspection three days later, she was decommissioned 16 December. Transferred to the War Shipping Administration, she was used for a time on a loan basis by the Merchant Marine Cadet Corps as a training ship until returned to the Navy for disposal on 28 November 1944. Stricken from the Naval Vessel Register on 22 December 1944, the schooner was transferred to the Maritime Commission and eventually sold at public auction 18 October 1945.

== Fate ==
Purchased by a Cuban shipping firm, she was renamed Santa Clara and served another six years in the island trade. The aging schooner met her end off La Ceiba when, heavily laden, she ran into bad weather, took on water and sank on 21 December 1951.

== Awards ==
- American Campaign Medal
- World War II Victory Medal

== Bibliography ==
- Beyer, Edward F. & Beyer, Kenneth M. (1991). "U. S. Navy Mystery Ships". Warship International. XXVIII (4). International Naval Research Organization: 322–372. ISSN 0043-0374.
