= The Honor of the Queen =

1993 novel by David Weber

- First edition
- Author: David Weber
- Cover artist: Laurence Schwinger
- Language: English
- Series: Honor Harrington series
- Genre: Military science fiction
- Publisher: Baen Books
- Publication date: 1993
- Publication place: United States
- Media type: Print (hardback and paperback)
- Pages: 422
- ISBN: 0-671-72172-0
- OCLC: 316892473
- Dewey Decimal: 813/.54
- LC Class: PS3573.E217 H69 2000
- Preceded by: On Basilisk Station
- Followed by: The Short Victorious War

The Honor of the Queen is a science fiction novel by American writer David Weber, initially published in 1993. It is the second book in the Honor Harrington series. In the book, naval captain Honor Harrington must engage in diplomatic talks with Planet Grayson, whose citizens are fiercely patriarchal.

== Plot summary ==
Three years after the events of On Basilisk Station, Captain Honor Harrington returns to the Star Kingdom following an extended anti-piracy campaign in the Silesian Confederacy. Harrington's ship, HMS Fearless, is tasked with escorting a small Manticoran squadron on a diplomatic mission to the planet Grayson, a society governed by deeply sexist and patriarchal norms. The mission is led by Admiral Raoul Courvosier, Honor's mentor and close friend. As the long-anticipated war with Haven is looming close, Manticore is working to form an Alliance with many small nations. Grayson is critical to this effort. Adding to the tension, Haven is negotiating its own alliance with Masada, Grayson's historical rival.

The Manticoran ships arrive at the star system where Grayson is located and are greeted by the small Grayson Navy. The welcome is soured when the Graysons see Harrington, a woman, in uniform. After several hostile confrontations, Harrington leaves the system to escort a convoy of freighters, even though Courvosier tries to convince her to stay.

After Harrington departs with three of the four Manticoran warships, Courvosier begins diplomatic efforts with Admiral Bernard Yanakov, the commander of the Grayson Navy. However, their efforts are abruptly halted as a Masadan fleet attacks Grayson, targeting space stations across the system. Courvosier and Yanakov join forces against the Masadans. Unbeknownst to them, the Masadans command two Havenite warships that swiftly overwhelm Grayson's outdated defenses, resulting in the tragic deaths of both Courvosier and Yanakov.

Harrington's ships return to Grayson and are attacked by Masadans, damaging one of her ships. After entering Grayson's orbit, they are appraised of the critical situation following the battle and the death of Courvosier. Honor strong-arms Protector Benjamin into allowing her to take a leading role in the defense of Grayson. She also then defends him against Masadan assassins, losing one of her eyes, earning her a great deal of acclaim from the Grayson people.

Grayson soon learns that Masada has built an advanced base within Grayson's star system. Leading her ships and the remnants of the Grayson fleet, Harrington defeats a group of Masadan warships. One of her prisoners tells Harrington that there are POWs at the base that he suspects are being ill-treated. An assault led by Harrington's Marines follows and the Masadan base is captured; they find most of the Manticoran prisoners executed and all the female prisoners horrifically brutalized. Harrington nearly performs an on-the-spot execution of the Masadan commander.

On Masada, the Havenite advisers see that Masada's bid to conquer Grayson is doomed and try to pull out. However, the Masadans find out and seize control of the Haven Sultan-class battlecruiser Saladin, which they have renamed Thunder of God. It's captain, Alfredo Yu, catches wind of the mutiny and pulls as many Havenite crewmembers off the ship as he can, leaving the Masadan fanatics in possession of a ship that outguns all of Harrington's remaining ships.

Harrington calls for reinforcements while she prepares to fight the Masadans. The Manticorans' superior tactical skills, and the Masadans' unfamiliarity with their ship, allow them to inflict much more damage on Thunder of God than expected, but Thunder of God, by sheer weight of fire, is able to destroy a ship and inflict severe damage on Fearless. Manticoran reinforcements arrive in-system undetected. Despite knowing the outcome is hopeless, Harrington commits Fearless against Thunder of God hoping to do enough damage to prevent them from attacking Grayson. In a desperate gamble, the Manticoran reinforcements distract the Masadan crew at a crucial moment, allowing Fearless to destroy the larger ship.

With Grayson secured, a joint Manticore-Grayson fleet occupies Masada. Alfredo Yu and his Havenite refugees from Saladin surrender to the Graysonites; several defect, including Yu himself. Protector Benjamin decorates Harrington with the Star of Grayson and appoints her as Steadholder (governor) of a new fief on Grayson, allowing her to help Benjamin speed up his planned social reforms. Finally, the Manticoran government creates Harrington a Countess and names her a Companion of the Knights of King George.

== Analysis ==
"The Grayson society" introduced in this book has been a subject of academic analysis by Steven Hrotic in his book Religion in Science Fiction. Hrotic writes that the Graysons represent "positive examples of a religion not because they lack flaws, but because they are willing to admit their flaws, and change".

== Reviews ==
- Review by Carolyn Cushman (1993) in Locus, #390 July 1993
- Review by John C. Bunnell (1993) in Dragon Magazine, September 1993
- Review by Norm Hartman (1997) in Space & Time, Summer 1997
- Review by Stephen Deas (2000) in Vector 214

The book was reviewed for the Polish fanzine Esensja by Magda Fabrykowska.

Preceded by On Basilisk Station Preceding Short Story: in Changer of Worlds (sub-series: Worlds of Honor #3) Ms. Midshipwoman Harrington	The Honor of the Queen; Honor Harrington books Central figure: Honor Harrington In Chronological Order: Second Novel in book series Publication order: Second work published (©1993 MMPB, 2000 HC)	Succeeded by The Short Victorious War (1994 MMPB, 2000 HC); HC: ISBN 0-671-87596-5
