= Rick Cook (writer) =

American author (1944–2022)

- Born: 1944
- Died: January 13, 2022 (aged 77–78)
- Other name: Sir Richard Ironsteed
- Occupation: Writer
- Years active: 1987–1998
- Website: rickcooks.blogspot.com

James Richard Cook (1944 – January 13, 2022) was an American author of novels and stories.

== Personal life and death ==
James Richard Cook was born in 1944. In 1988, Cook was living in Phoenix, Arizona. That June, he was a contestant on Jeopardy!; over the course of two days, he won a boxed Jeopardy! game, a Caribbean resort vacation on Saint Martin via Eastern Air Lines, and US$12,300 (equivalent to $33,484 in 2025). In the Society for Creative Anachronism, where he co-founded the Kingdom of Atenveldt, he was known as Sir Richard Ironsteed. Cook died on January 13, 2022.

== Published works ==
=== Articles ===
As of January 2022, Locus listed five articles published by Cook:

- Schmidt, Stanley, ed. (July 1986). "A Long Stern Chase: A Speculative Exercise". Analog Science Fiction and Fact. Vol. 106, no. 7. Davis Publications. p. 32.
- Schmidt, Stanley, ed. (December 1986). "The Season of the Witch". Analog Science Fiction and Fact. Vol. 106, no. 12. Davis Publications. p. 4.
- Baen, Jim, ed. (November 1988). "Robert A. Heinlein and the Coming Age of Space". New Destinies. Vol. VI. Baen Books. p. 76. ISBN 0-671-69796-X.
- Schmidt, Stanley, ed. (August 1989). "Neural Nets". Analog Science Fiction and Fact. Vol. 109, no. 8. Davis Publications. p. 86.
- With Manly, Peter L. (April 1992). Schmidt, Stanley (ed.). "Cyberspaced Out: Manners and Mores in the Global Village". Analog Science Fiction and Fact. Vol. 112, no. 5. Davis Publications. p. 52.

=== Stories ===
As of January 2022, Locus listed 13 stories published by Cook:

- Schmidt, Stanley, ed. (January 1987). "Mortality". Analog Science Fiction and Fact. Vol. 107, no. 1. Davis Publications. p. 104.
- Schmidt, Stanley, ed. (October 1987). "Catalyst". Analog Science Fiction and Fact. Vol. 107, no. 10. Davis Publications. p. 144.
- Schmidt, Stanley, ed. (February 1988). "Dreamers". Analog Science Fiction and Fact. Vol. 108, no. 2. Davis Publications. p. 116.
- Schmidt, Stanley, ed. (April 1988). "Seance". Analog Science Fiction and Fact. Vol. 108, no. 4. Davis Publications. p. 80.
- Bradley, Marion Zimmer, ed. (August 1988). "Revised Standard Virgin". Sword and Sorceress. Vol. V. DAW Books. pp. 272–280. ISBN 0-88677-288-5.
- Baen, Jim, ed. (November 1988). "Megaphone". New Destinies. Vol. VI. Baen Books. pp. 76–93. ISBN 0-671-69796-X.
- Schmidt, Stanley, ed. (April 1989). "Hackers". Analog Science Fiction and Fact. Vol. 109, no. 4. Davis Publications. p. 56.
- Herron, Jon L., ed. (1992). "Spelling Lesson". Midnight Zoo. Vol. 2, no. 4. Walnut Creek, California: Experiences Unlimited. pp. 45–47.
- Schmidt, Stanley, ed. (December 1992). "…And He Did Ride". Analog Science Fiction and Fact. Vol. 112, no. 14. Bantam Doubleday Dell. p. 96.
- With Manly, Peter L. (July 1994). Schmidt, Stanley (ed.). "Symphony for Skyfall". Analog Science Fiction and Fact. Vol. 114, no. 8&9. Bantam Doubleday Dell. p. 78. (Nominated for the 1995 Theodore Sturgeon Award)
- With Manly, Peter L. (December 1995). Schmidt, Stanley (ed.). "Unfinished Symphony". Analog Science Fiction and Fact. Vol. 115, no. 15. Dell Magazines. p. 10.
- With Manly, Peter L. (May 1997). Schmidt, Stanley (ed.). "On the Application of Quantum Probability Tunneling to Improve Manufacturability of Printed Circuit Board Designs: A Case Study". Analog Science Fiction and Fact. Vol. 117, no. 5. Dell Magazines. p. 92.
- Schmidt, Stanley, ed. (October 1998). "O'Carolan's Revenge". Analog Science Fiction and Fact. Vol. 118, no. 10. Dell Magazines. p. 61.

=== Novels ===
As of January 2022, Locus listed eight books published by Cook:

- Wizard's Bane. Baen Books. January 1989. ISBN 0-671-69803-6.
  The first in Cook's Wizardry series, the novel and its December second printing were originally sold for US$3.50 (equivalent to $9.09 in 2025).
- Limbo System. Baen Books. July 1989. ISBN 0-671-69835-4.
  Originally sold for $3.50 (equivalent to $9.09 in 2025).
- The Wizardry Compiled. Baen Books. December 1989. ISBN 0-671-69856-7.
  The sequel to Wizard's Bane, it originally sold for $3.95 (equivalent to $10.26 in 2025) with cover art by Larry Schwinger.
- The Wizardry Cursed. Baen Books. March 1991. ISBN 0-671-72049-X.
  The third Wizardry novel originally sold for $4.95 (equivalent to $11.7 in 2025) with cover art by Gary Ruddell.
- Mall Purchase Night. Baen Books. November 1993. ISBN 0-671-72198-4.
  Originally sold for $4.99 (equivalent to $11.12 in 2025), with cover art by Gary Ruddell.
- The Wizardry Consulted. Baen Books. November 1995. ISBN 0-671-87700-3.
  The fourth book in the Wizardry series, it originally sold for $5.99 (equivalent to $12.66 in 2025) with cover art by Cortney Skinner and Newell Convers.
- The Wizardry Quested. Baen Books. February 1996. ISBN 0-671-87708-9.
  The fifth novel in the Wizardry series originally sold for $5.99 (equivalent to $12.3 in 2025) and had cover art by Newell Convers and John Pierrard.
- The Wiz Biz. Baen Books. September 1997. ISBN 0-671-87846-8.
  Omnibus of Wizard's Bane and The Wizardry Compiled, it originally sold for $6.99 (equivalent to $14.02 in 2025), with cover art by Tom Kidd.
