= Mutineers' Moon =

1991 science fiction novel by David Weber

- Author: David Weber
- Cover artist: Paul Alexander
- Language: English
- Series: Dahak series
- Genre: Science fiction
- Publisher: Baen Books
- Publication date: October 1991
- Publication place: United States
- Pages: 315
- ISBN: 0671720856
- Followed by: The Armageddon Inheritance

Mutineers' Moon is a 1991 science fiction novel by American writer David Weber. It is the first book in his Dahak trilogy, and is available in the Baen Free Library.

It was later republished in the Empire from the Ashes compendium.

== Plot summary ==
The book's premise is that the Moon is a massive space ship controlled by a self-aware computer that wants its rightful crew back aboard.

=== Prologue ===
The book begins with a mutiny aboard the planetoid-sized Utu-class starship Dahak of the Fourth Imperium, a technologically advanced multi-star system empire more than 55,000 years old. The mutiny is led by its ambitious and psychopathic Chief of Engineering, Captain Anu, and Commander Inanna. Anu intends to take his followers to a planet where they can survive the genocidal attacks of the "Achuultani", a mysterious alien race that periodically exterminates intelligent life and has already destroyed the previous three Imperiums and the dinosaurs.

The loyal crew is caught by surprise and overwhelmed. The captain therefore orders Dahak to execute "Red Two Internal", flooding the vessel's interior with deadly substances and forcing both sides into the lifeboats. The ship is then ordered to admit only loyal crew members and eject the mutineers. The command kills the captain as well, however, leaving no one aboard to destroy the mutineers' warships or reverse Anu's sabotage of the power generators. Although Dahak detects the sabotage before all its power plants are destroyed, the damage forces it to shut down communications and all non-essential systems. By the time repairs are complete, decades later, the loyal crew have been systematically exterminated and Dahak can neither return to the Imperium nor destroy the mutineers without violating conflicting orders.

This dilemma lasts for approximately 50,000 years, until Earth's early space programme sends Lieutenant Commander Colin MacIntyre to map the dark side of the Moon, unaware that it is Dahak in disguise.

=== Story ===
Dahak hijacks Colin's mission and fakes his death, since returning with his data would expose the ship. Its AI explains the situation and persuades Colin, a descendant of the loyalists, to become its new captain and destroy the mutineers. Colin reluctantly agrees, particularly after evidence emerges that the Achuultani are beginning another incursion. Dahak surgically enhances him with superhuman strength, speed and resilience, as well as electronics allowing unprecedented control of Imperium technology.

Dahak has long known that Anu's forces are based beneath the South Pole in Antarctica, but their fortress is protected by force fields that can only be overcome with Dahak's heavy weapons, which would kill a significant proportion of Earth's population. Colin therefore returns home, reconnects with his elder brother Sean, and recruits him to identify Anu's agent within the space programme. Their investigation is detected, and the brothers fight off mutineers at the cost of Sean's life before Colin is captured by another group.

The group is led by former missile technician Horus, whose faction supported Anu during the original mutiny but subsequently mutinied against him and fled to Earth. They entered stasis to survive the primitive civilisation Anu had imposed on the planet and, as civilisation re-emerges, have waged a covert war against him. Their battleship, the Nergal, commands a large network of human agents, many descended from its crew. Colin's arrival changes the balance because Dahak has finally intervened.

The Nergal and Horus's faction join Colin in a plan to destroy Anu. They destroy several important installations, forcing Anu to recall his senior personnel to Antarctica, while agents inside his fortress steal the access codes. The allies then feign defeat, allowing the agents to transmit the codes once Anu lowers his guard. They launch a full assault supported by Dahak's orbital weapons. The attack is costly, but Anu and his forces are destroyed, with Commander Inanna's brain ripped out.

Dahak's power forces Earth's governments to submit to Colin as Planetary Governor. However, the approaching Achuultani threat leaves little time to unite the planet, and the Imperium remains silent even after Dahak's communications are restored. Colin leaves Earth in Horus's care and departs for the nearest Fleet Imperium base, seeking Imperial assistance.

== Concept and creation ==
Author David Weber says the genesis for this book began with a question: "Assume that Earth doesn't actually have a Moon, but rather a giant starship disguised as our Moon which has been there for at least 50 or 60,000 years. Where did it come from, why did it come here, and why hasn't it left?" Weber says the answer to those questions built the foundation for this book and its sequels.

== Cancelled anime adaptation ==
A division of North American anime distributor A.D. Vision was working on an anime adaptation of this series, but it was cancelled with the 2009 bankruptcy of A.D. Vision.
