= Belisarius series =

Alternate history and military history novel series

Volumes I and II reprinted in hardcover and released together (September 2007).

The Belisarius Series is a fictional saga in the alternate history and military history subgenres of science fiction, written by American authors David Drake and Eric Flint. Its protagonist is a real historical figure, the late Roman general Flavius Belisarius (505–565 AD).

The saga is published by Baen Books wherein an overarching theme ties each book together.

== Books ==
Originally intended as a trilogy as outlined by David Drake, each of the initial drafts were divided into two books. The series consists of the following six books:

1. An Oblique Approach (1998)
2. In the Heart of Darkness (1998)
3. Destiny's Shield (1999)
4. Fortune's Stroke (2000)
5. The Tide of Victory (2001)
6. The Dance of Time (2006)

All of these are available as e-books from Baen. The first four were in the Baen Free Library until removed in early 2013.

- Islands (novella) by Eric Flint in The Warmasters (2002; ISBN 0-7434-7185-7)

=== Omnibus reprints ===
Each volume contains two novels.

- Belisarius I: Thunder at Dawn (ISBN 9781416555681) Cover art by Kurt Miller.
- Belisarius II: Storm at Noontide (ISBN 9781416591481)
- Belisarius III: The Flames of Sunset (ISBN 9781439132807)

== Plot ==
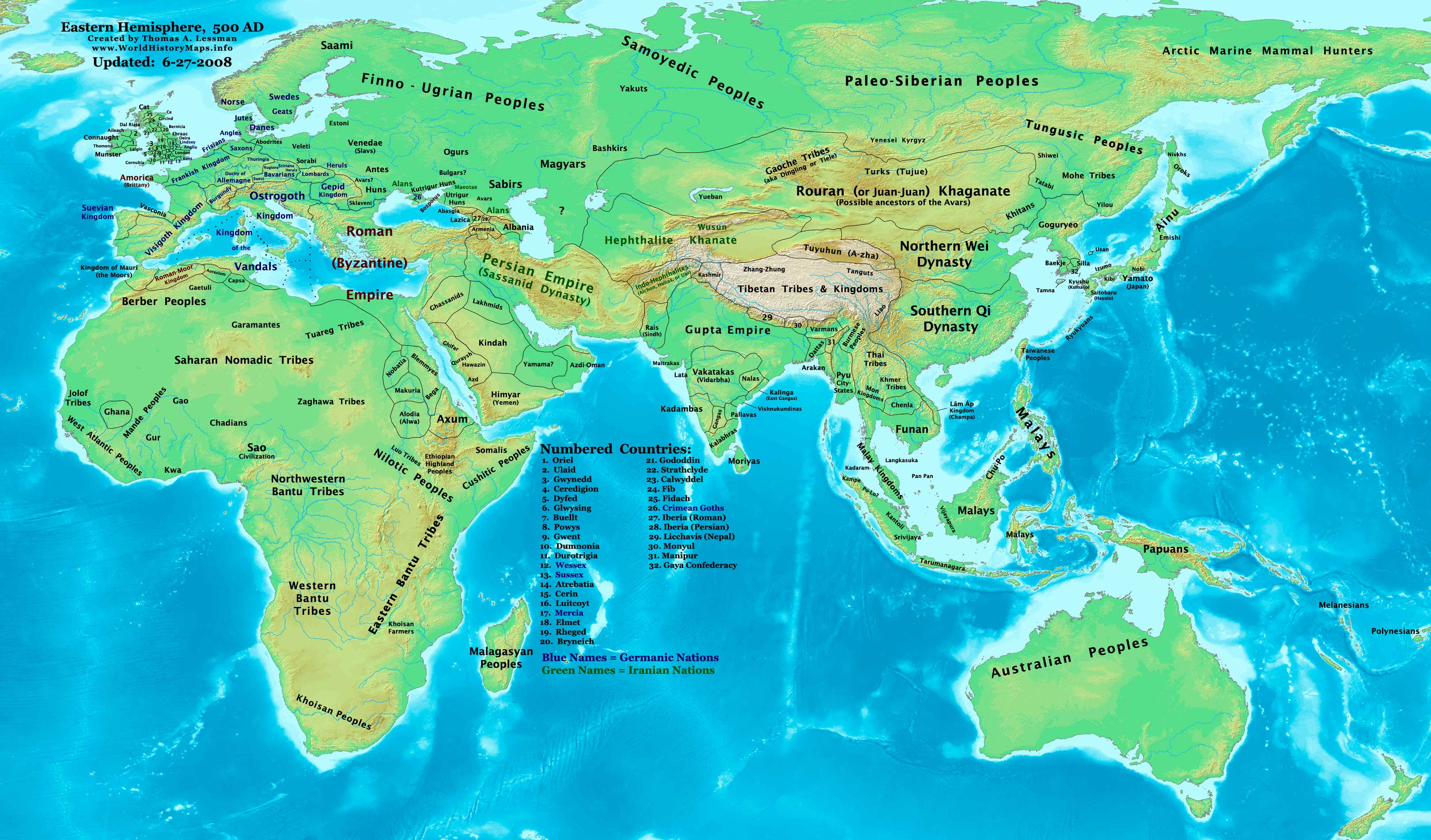
The Eastern Hemisphere c. 500, a few decades before the time the series is set

The premise of this science fiction (more specifically alternate history) series is that a war between two competing societies in the future spills over to 6th century Earth. The New Gods back the Malwa Empire of India (Note: References the Malwa region of Central India, part of the Gupta Empire in the 6th century.) and commence attempts to conquer the world and stamp out meritorious accomplishment as a means to privilege and instead favor planned eugenics and hereditary birth (autocracy) in order to change the future. Meritorious performance is seen to originate in the Eastern Roman Empire, and the root cause of a future that must be changed by conquest, and Malwa has a malleable society and the base power for their intervention. Anything in the way (other Indian kingdoms, the Sassanid Persian Empire, and so forth) must be crushed, including plans to deal with China after Byzantium falls.

The Malwa Empire is advised and controlled by a calculating cyborg (human/machine) interface named Link, and the empire uses gunpowder technology to conquer most of the rest of India. To counter this, the other side, crystalline entities originating in humanity's far future after much adaptive exploration of the galaxies, contacts the Byzantine general Belisarius via a local holy man and shows him the vision of the future with Malwa conquering the Byzantine Empire and the world. This in essence, puts the problem of thwarting the horrible future visions exposed by the crystal in Belisarius's lap even as emissaries of the far off Malwa Empire are visiting Rome to establish a factional struggle to divide Byzantium—and are becoming very popular amongst some of the ruling class and with the Emperor Justinian in particular, forcing Belisarius and friends to move surreptitiously.

Belisarius, though a cataphract general (heavy cavalry) more attuned to direct approaches, is no stranger to either intrigues or indirect methods—and is thus a good choice for the crystalline emissary to contact within the Byzantine political situation, as he must work with imperfect tools, including the suspicious Byzantine Emperor Justinian I and the Empress Theodora, to thwart the hidden Malwa plotting and invasion. He and his wife thus spearhead a conspiracy to save the empire despite its rulers, setting out to build an alliance with Byzantium's historical enemy, Persia, with whom they are currently effectively at war, the African Kingdom of Axum—a naval and trading power of the day which is so far away little is known of it or its capabilities, and various Indian forces and individuals that remain in opposition to Malwa—which may or may not be out there, but which are suggested by the visions presented by the mysterious crystal—whatever agenda it might have. So starts "just another day at the office" for what is arguably one of the best general officers known to history.

An Oblique Approach primarily revolves around Belisarius, a grand-master of the indirect approach, and a few trusted confidants forming a conspiracy to save the empire under the nose of their jealous and dangerously paranoid emperor. This is a period of seeming calm that precedes any major conflict between rivals where the conspiracy struggles to play catch up and not let its existence be discovered by friend or foe—an important deception hoping to gain both information and time. During the conflict and action, the greater part of this book, the Byzantines are at war with the Sassanid Persian Empire, and the general takes uncharacteristic "great risks" instead of indirection at one point to bring that conflict to a speedy end. This uncharacteristic event in turn partially exposes his conspiracy to his good friend, a fellow general who becomes part of the intrigue and willing co-conspirator thereafter.

In the Heart of Darkness primarily revolves around Belisarius learning the strengths and weaknesses of both his Axumite allies and his Malwa enemies. The cataphract general personally travels to India to explore for vulnerabilities (spy) among the Malwa Empire's peoples, and spars dangerously both with the rulers themselves and their spies planted in Constantinople. The conspiracy against the Malwa expands to a few others and establishes a secret research site overseen by his wife and a discredited naval officer who carry on an affair seemingly under the nose of a Malwa spy, dance further in 'feigned disaffection' with spies of the Malwa and their allies within Byzantium and so tend to things in Byzantium with the added cast of a fellow General (Belisarius' best friend) and his spy mistress.

Belisarius meanwhile leaves the dangers of both his emperor—being too popular can be a 'bad thing' and his stunning victories in the first book against the Persians made him so—and cultivates the Kingdom of Axum as allies, a naval power of the day, and leads a five-man invasion of his 'exposed' Malwa enemies (nominally diplomatic friends).

The events in this book provide him time to plan out various contingencies which come to bear fruit in surprising ways in the later sequels and allow the West's own gunpower tech researchers to get started. During his journey, the spy mission and deception allow Belisarius to become better able to communicate and understand the crystalline emissary "Aide".

Belisarius learns of his true enemy, the mysterious entity known as Link, an artificial intelligence that uses human bodies as its interactive device. It concludes with the war between the Byzantines led by Belisarius against his Malwa enemies transforming from a cold to a hot war as Belisarius, separated from his companions by urgent circumstances born of intrigue and might—is hotly pursued fleeing half of Malwa's might, alone and unaided, some 1500 miles from the Malwa capital (Modern Delhi) to make his way back home to the west. His companions (and people they gathered along the way during the course of the spying parts of the book) are also variously pursued, but saved by prior contingency planning by the wily general, who is at least as good at deceptions as he is at indirections (But they are complementary skills).

Destiny's Shield deals with the Malwa invasion of the Persian Empire, and the growing of an alliance and trust between the Byzantines and Persians to stop the invasion and to cement a permanent peace. Belisarius' actions and magnanimous behavior as victor in the first book will pay a pivotal role as the third book develops and the secret war against the Malwa turns hot. Belisarius leads an under-strength expeditionary force in much more characteristic "indirect approaches" to the aid of the Persian empire which as a new ally had requested four to five times as many troops. The Malwa invade the gut of Persia by sea through the Persian Gulf during the monsoons with an unbelievably huge (Asian) army (to the Persians and other Byzantium generals) which force succeeds in battering the unwary and surprised Persians (forcing them to seek peace with Justinian) and penetrates as far as Babylon thereby pinning most of Persia's military might and paralyzing its capabilities whilst also invading from the Hindu Kush by land into eastern Persia. Belisarius gains the trust of the Persian Emperor, uses the chance of conspiracy and treason as a hole card, and generally totally upsets the Malwa plans of conquest by repeatedly tactically showing one thing and strategically moving unseen in surprising real tactics when it matters.

Fortune's Stroke covers the later events of the Malwa Invasion of Persia as Belisarius must campaign against Rana Sanga, a Rajput general of great skill who befriended Belisarius during the second book of the series, who is loyal to the Malwa through an overdeveloped adherence to honoring his given word. The campaign is but another stratagem (developing like a good mystery story) while in fact, Belisarius is carefully marking time and giving other events set in motion by himself and the conspiracy members time to bear fruit and astonish both friends, and readers in the events and results.

The Tide of Victory begins the third phase of the war against the Malwa, with Belisarius appointed commander of a combined Byzantine/Persian army to invade India while Axum and the Kushans (a tribe turned against the Malwa in the subterfuges of Fortune's Stroke) carry out operations north and south of him. By moving boldly, the obvious again is demonstrated as delightfully false in the stratagems of Belisarius and the developments at times both delight and dismay his allies. In the end, "In Belisarius we trust" becomes a motto of all save the Malwa.

The Dance of Time concludes the series as the disparate events set in motion by Belisarius unfold, creating the opportunities that he hopes will end the threat that the Malwa pose to Rome once and for all.

== Reception and analysis ==
A reviewer for Gizmodo included the series in his list of "Preposterously Manly Fantasy Series", describing the protagonist as "a master of the battlefield but in action and in strategy... equally skilled at playing politics or getting his hands dirty".

A reviewer for Tor.com noted that the authors are "not using the story of Belisarius—they’re using the characters in a different story. Though I suppose that in itself testifies to the popularity of Belisarius".

Volume 2 was reviewed in Nowa Fantastyka (2007/2).

== See also ==
- The General series—Another series plotted by David Drake, with a main character and story inspired by the historical Belisarius
- Lest Darkness Fall—By L. Sprague de Camp; another scenario of Belisarius and his time being impacted by a (far more sympathetic) visitor from the future
