= The War God's Own =

1999 fantasy novel by David Weber

First edition (publ. Baen Books) Cover artist:Larry Elmore

The War God's Own is a fantasy novel by American writer David Weber, published in 1999. The second book in his War God series, it follows the adventures of Bahzell Bahnakson and his friend Brandark. The novel is set in a swords and sorcery land with dwarves, elves, humans, hradani, and halflings—the Five Races of Man. There is a pantheon of Gods, some good and some vile. It is followed by Wind Rider's Oath, published in 2004.

== Plot ==
Bahzell and Brandark come to Belhadan, a major port city, where they are met by Sir Vaijon, a knight-probationer of the Order of Tomanāk. Vaijon, as many members of the local chapter of Tomanāk's order, is very offended by the notion of a hradani champion, as the hradani are generally viewed as barbarians, and more likely to serve the dark gods than not. The general discomfort finally comes to a head, in a duel between Bazhell and Vaijon after Vaijon accuses Bazhell of serving the dark gods, which Bazhell handily wins. A personal appearance from Tomanāk dispels most further prejudice against him. Shortly thereafter they set off for Hurgrum, as Sharnā, one of the dark gods, has been interfering in hradani politics. Along the way they meet up again with Wencit of Rūm, the last white wizard, and another champion of Tomanāk, a human woman named Kaeritha.

On arriving in Hurgrum, Bazhell tells his father about Sharnā's meddling and his involvement with the heir of one of Bahnak's enemies. He then swears in an entire hradani chapter of the Order of Tomanāk, and they launch an attack on Sharnā's underground church. However, the time required to get to the center of the church allows Sharna's high priest to summon a demon, which Bahzell, Vaijon and Kaeritha have to fight. Vaijon stabs it, but loses his sword in the process. When they return to Hurgrum, Tomanāk returns it to him, and at the same time claims sword-oath from him as a champion.

Having rooted out Sharnā's church, one final crisis awaits. Bahzell, and the Order of Tomanāk, must repel an invasion by a force of Sothoii warriors, acting under the orders of Matthian, Warder of Glanharrow, who is acting without permission out of his deep hatred for the hradani. His superiors arrive in time, and the entire force surrenders to the Order. Bahzell leaves for the Sothoii lands with Kaeritha, leaving Vaijon to organize the hradani Order of Tomanāk.

== Characters ==
- Bazhell Bahnakson of the Horse Stealer hradani. The son of Bahnak, the prince of Hurgrum, the first hradani champion of Tomanak in more than 1,200 years.
- Brandark Brandarkson of the Bloody Sword hradani.
- Sir Vaijon of Almerhas, a knight-probationer, and later champion, of the Order of Tomanāk.
- Kaeritha, a champion of Tomanāk who joins Bazhell in his effort to defeat Sharnā.
- Wencit of Rūm, an ancient white wild wizard.
- Tomanāk Orfro, God of War and Justice.
