= Baen Free Library =

Digital library

- Website type: Digital library
- Owner: Baen Books
- Creator: Eric Flint
- Website: www.baen.com/allbooks/category/index/id/2012
- Commercial: No
- Registration: No
- Launched: 1999; 27 years ago
- Current status: Active

The Baen Free Library is a digital library of the science fiction and fantasy publishing house Baen Books where 61 e-books as of June 2016 (112 e-books as of December 2008) can be downloaded free in a number of formats, without copy protection. It was founded in late 1999 by science fiction writer Eric Flint and publisher Jim Baen to determine whether the availability of books free of charge on the Internet encourages or discourages the sale of their paper books.

The Baen Free Library represents an experiment in the field of intellectual property and copyright. It appears that sales of both the e-books made available free and other books by the same author, even from a different publisher, increase when the electronic version is made available free of charge.

Baen Ebooks also sells individual e-books and a subscription-based e-book program. The books in the Free Library are available via the website for Baen Ebooks in various formats including HTML, Rich Text Format, and EPUB as well as unencrypted .mobi for Kindle.

== Baen CDs ==
In 2002, Baen also started adding CD-ROMs into some hardcovers of newest titles in successful series. They contain the complete series of novels preceding the printed book (for those books that were the latest in a series), other works by the same author, some works by other authors, and multimedia bonuses. The CD-ROMs have a prominent permissive copyright license which expressly encourages free-of-charge copying and sharing, including over the Internet.

Some of these CDs also contain MP3 audiobook versions. As of 2015 CD 24 Invasion published in 2010 was the last promotional Baen CD.

- CD 01 Honorverse also contains The Shadow of the Lion and 1632 among others.
- CD 06 Wind Rider's Oath and CD 06b Shadow of Saganami were published in 2004.
- CD 13 1634: The Baltic War and CD 13 The Best of Jim Baen's Universe 2006 were published in 2006.
- CD 22 Mission of Honor also contains Exodus and 1633 among others.
- CD 23 1635: The Eastern Front features the 1632 and Heirs of Alexandria series among others.
- CD 24 Cryoburn was replaced by CD 24 Invasion in the Secret World Chronicles.
