= Oath of Swords =

1995 fantasy novel by David Weber

- First edition cover
- Author: David Weber
- Cover artist: Larry Elmore
- Language: English
- Series: War God series
- Genre: Fantasy
- Publisher: Baen Books
- Publication date: 1995
- Publication place: United States
- Media type: Print (Paperback) & E-book
- ISBN: 0-671-87642-2
- OCLC: 31869943
- Followed by: The War God's Own

Oath of Swords is a fantasy novel by American author David Weber, the first in the War God series. It follows the adventures of Bahzell Bahnakson and his friend Brandark; the format is a swords-and-sorcery land with dwarves, elves, humans, and hradani—the Four Races. There is a pantheon of gods, some good—the Gods of Light—and some vile—the Dark Gods.

== Plot ==
Bahzell Bahnakson is an exchange hostage in Navahk. While taking the back way out of the palace to meet his friend Brandark, he hears screaming. When he investigates he finds a hradani woman named Farmah being raped and brutally beaten by the crown prince Harnak. He attacks Harnak and frees Farmah, smuggling her out of the city with the help of another servant woman, Tala. He sends the women towards Hurgrum, then strikes off in another direction, hoping to draw pursuit away from them. Brandark joins him, and together they set off east to try to find work. Unfortunately, hradani are not popular in other lands, and they are unwelcome in most places they go. The wealthy dwarven merchant Kilthandaknarthas hires them as caravan guards and they travel with him for some time, beating off several attacks by a group of assassins called the Dog Brothers, who are connected to Sharna's church. Harnak, who has been secretly worshiping Sharna, is the one who arranged for the Dog Brothers to be sent after Bahzell, because as long as Bahzell is alive he is a threat to Harnak's position. Bahzell and Brandark do not yet realize this.

Eventually, Bahzell and Brandark leave Kilthan in a city called Riverside. Bahzell finds a job as a bar bouncer but is fired after another assassination attempt fails. While walking to the inn where he and Brandark are staying, he again hears screaming; he follows the screaming into an alley, where he rescues a noblewoman named Zarantha from the Empire of the Spear. She tells the city guard that she is his employer, saving him from jail. Brandark, with Zarantha's help, begins writing a song in honor of Bahzell.

As they travel, there are more attacks by the Dog Brothers. They also encounter more divine intervention in their trip, which Bahzell resents, culminating in a personal appearance by Chesmirsa, the Singer of Light, in an effort to recruit Bahzell for her brother Tomanāk. Shortly after that divine visit, Rekah is badly hurt and Zarantha is kidnapped. Zarantha was planning to set up a mage academy in her native land to give her countrymen the training they need. She has been kidnapped by dark wizards, allowing them to harness her life energy for a magical working. They would prefer to take her home first, as they will get more out of the working if they do it on her own soil. The hradani leave Zarantha's armsman Tothas and Rekah behind, and set off after Zarantha.

Harnak and the church of Sharna in Navahk have decided that this has gone on long enough. They use a human sacrifice to raise a demon, which they send after Bahzell, and to enchant a sword to allow Sharna himself to reach through the bearer and strike directly. The demon catches up with Bahzell and Brandark as they flee. Bahzell wins, with Tomanāk's help, and finally agrees to take sword-oath as a champion of Tomanāk. He and Brandark once again run, eventually entering the lands of the half-elven Purple Lords. Bahzell's compulsion for rescuing people leads him to interfere with a Purple Lord who is in the middle of throwing an entire village out into the wilderness for being short of rent. He kills the Purple Lord and instructs the townspeople to blame everything on a band of invading hradani, to draw the pursuit. Harnak is also following them, and the Purple Lords end up tracking him, believing him to be the one who killed the lord of the village.

Harnak eventually catches up with Bahzell and the two of them do battle, in order to strike out at Bahzell and Tomanāk, who fights against him through his champion. Bahzell eventually defeats Harnak. Brandark fights the prince's entire guard, all of whom had been in the grip of the Rage, and is mortally wounded. Calling out to Tomanāk, Bahzell demands to know why his friend must die. Tomanāk tells Bahzell that he can heal Brandark through Bahzell, if he can see Brandark as fully healed. Bahzell is successful and Brandark's fatal wounds heal, leaving him alive and recovering, though missing an ear and two fingers. The two companions then travel to Bortalik Bay, where they receive a message from Zarantha that she is safe and well and that her father has adopted the two hradani. She offers them any assistance that her house can provide. Bahzell gets them, and they set off for Belhadan.

== Characters ==
Bahzell Bahnakson of the Horse Stealer hradani. The son of Bahnak, prince of Hurgrum, Bahzell has a strong sense of honor, which gets him into trouble from the get-go as he cannot ignore the injustices that happen around him. He is very stubborn and tends to react with violence to any threat that crosses his path. He initially has very little respect for, and not a trace of awe towards, any of the gods, Light or Dark, because of the curse of "the Rage" that his people suffered at the hands of the followers of Carnadosa, and the apparent indifference of the Gods of Light to their predicament.

Brandark Brandarkson of the Bloody Sword hradani. The son of one of Churnazh's Bloody Sword allies, Brandark is generally held in contempt in Navahk for his civility, which is seen as weakness, and is disliked by the prince for his political satire. He is something of dandy dresser with an effete mannerism, an intellectual and a scholar with a lifelong ambition to become a bard (though he lacks a decent singing voice), which is why he favors the goddess Chesmirsa. He has a witty sense of humor and a vicious way with words, which go hand in hand with his fighting skills.

Crown Prince Harnak of Navahk of the Bloody Sword hradani. Harnak is a truly loathsome person in every respect, as he enjoys causing pain and humiliation to others and cares about nothing but his own pleasures. It is this reason that causes him to worship the Dark God Sharna, who offers him more pleasures of the flesh than he could ever have imagined and promises to him the throne of Navahk in the future.

Kilthandahknarthos (Kilthan): A dwarf merchant who hires Bazhell and Brandark on as caravan guards.

Zarantha: a noblewoman who was sent to the Empire of the Axe for schooling when she was discovered to be a mage. She plans to create a mage academy in her native land, as without proper training and protection the mages there usually die before coming into their powers. She befriends Bazhell and Brandark, and they help her get home.

Wencit of Rūm: an ancient white sorcerer. Wencit is the last remaining member of the Council of Ottovar and the most powerful wizard in the world. He wanders about Norfressa, enforcing the ancient Strictures of Ottovar, the code of law that governs the use of magic, and assists Bahzell and Brandark in saving Zarantha's life from the Carnadosan priests. He has a wry sense of humor and an uncanny ability to know things about people he's never met.

Tomanāk Orfro: God of War and Justice. He is the most powerful god after the father Orr and the war general of the Gods of Light. Throughout the story he attempts to recruit Bahzell into his service, believing that he has what it take to serve the forces of good in the world.

== The races of man ==
Humans: Humans are one of the three original races of man, and actually the first of the three. They are also the only ones to have wizardry. At present Wencit of Rūm is the only white wizard.

Dwarves: One of the original three races of man, the dwarves prefer to live underground, and have an affinity for stone and metal. This is related to a talent that some dwarves have: the ability to manipulate stone with a form of magic, Sarthnasikarmanthar. Dwarves tend to be ambitious and interested in trade; many are fantastically wealthy.

Hradani: Hradani are one of the original three races of man. Larger and tougher than humans, they were originally a very calm, deliberate people. However, in the Wizard Wars many years ago, the dark wizards used wizardry to change the Hradani genetically, in order to use them as shock troops. As a result, male hradani are subject to mad flares of violent anger, known as the Rage. Because of this, and because they served the dark (albeit unwillingly) during the Fall of Kontovar, they are generally hated and feared. After the Fall they fled to deserted areas and were generally reduced to barbarism.

Elves: Elves were created by the two ancient white wizards Ottovar and Gwynetha. Originally a group of magic users called witches, who were much harder to police than wizards were, they traded their ability to work magic for immortality. They tend to isolate themselves from the world, remaining in their city of Saramfel.

Halflings: Halflings are short creatures with small ivory horns, that began to appear after the Fall. Where they came from is unsure, but it is possible that they are the result of careless shielding by dark wizards in the Fall of Kontovar.

== Reception ==
The book was reviewed for the Polish fanzine Esensja by Jarosław Loretz.

== Publication ==
The original edition was released in February 1995 (ISBN 0-671-87642-2).

The books in the War God series are:

1. Oath of Swords
2. The War God's Own (May 1998), ISBN 0-671-87873-5
3. Wind Rider's Oath (May 2004), ISBN 0-7434-8821-0
4. Sword Brother, a novella published together with a January 2007 edition of Oath of Swords, ISBN 1-4165-2086-4
5. War Maid's Choice (July 2012), ISBN 978-1-4516-3835-6 (HB)
6. The Sword of the South (August 4, 2015), ISBN 978-1476780849
