= Strega =

Strega, the Italian word for witch, may refer to:

- Strega, a group of pagan magic users who are part of the protectors of Venice in the Heirs of Alexandria series by Mercedes Lackey, Eric Flint, and Dave Freer
- Strega, a group of Persona-users in the video game Persona 3
- Stregheria, or the Strega tradition of modern Italian witchcraft

== Other ==
- Strega (liqueur)
- Strega (novel), by Andrew Vachss
- Strega Prize, an Italian literary award
- Strega, a P-51 Mustang that races at the Reno Air Races
