= The Armageddon Inheritance =

1993 novel by David Weber

- First edition
- Author: David Weber
- Cover artist: David B. Mattingly
- Language: English
- Series: Dahak series
- Genre: Military science fiction
- Publication place: United States
- Preceded by: Mutineers' Moon
- Followed by: Heirs of Empire

The Armageddon Inheritance is a science fiction novel by American writer David Weber, formed by two books containing a total of 27 chapters. It is the second book in his Dahak trilogy (after Mutineers' Moon, and before Heirs of Empire). Thematically, it forms a duology with Mutineers' Moon; the latter dealt with the suppression of Anu's mutiny as part of the groundwork for repelling the Achuultani assault, whilst Heirs of Empire is more of a stand-alone bildungsroman work concerning survival on a remote planet. In 2003, it was republished in the omnibus volume Empire from the Ashes.

== Plot summary ==
=== Book 1 ===
After the events of Mutineers' Moon, the evil mutineer Anu has been defeated by the warship Dahak, aided by its new captain, Colin MacIntyre. As the highest-ranking officer of the Imperium present, MacIntyre had elevated himself to the rank of "Governor of Earth" in order to absolve the loyalist mutineers of their crimes; he then unified the worlds' governments under his authority (backed up by his advanced Imperial armaments and Dahak) and set Horus the task of preparing defenses against the Achuultani scouts, which have been methodically advancing on the Sol system, detected by self-destructing Imperial sensor arrays. This gave frantic defenders under Lieutenant Governor Horus and his assistant, Gerald Hatcher, barely two years to pacify the holdouts to the new world order (such as the Asian Alliance), to modernize the world economy, and to construct and power a planetary defense shield, as well as construct and train a space fleet and the fortresses on the ground which will support the fleet; and then of course to defeat both the scouts and the main Achuultani incursion. The primary holdout to participation in the planetary defense plan was the Asian Alliance, a group of all Asian nations except Japan and the Philippines. It was effectively controlled by a Marshal Tsien Tao-ling, who is convinced to join by the obvious military imbalance (the moon having disappeared, and several Middle Eastern nations forcibly disarmed by Imperium technology-equipped troops) and by the promise of considerable local autonomy and control of four seats on the nine-person council advising Horus. Regardless, the military programs soon get underway. To withstand the Siege (as the coming attack on Earth has come to be called) the Earth's defenses consists of front line spaceships, constructed by "orbital industrial units" left behind by Dahak (clanking replicators, in other words); a planetary shield powered by a core tap; and all backed up by numerous hypermissile launchers built into "Planetary Defense Centers" (sheared off and embedded with armaments mountains around the Earth).

In the meantime, Colin and his new wife, Jiltanith (daughter of Horus), take Dahak and depart for the nearest known Imperial system to seek military aid from the Imperium; little is expected to come of this quest, as Dahak had been attempting to contact the Imperium via his FTL "hypercom", but failing completely.

The first system they arrive at, the Sheskar system, is devoid of life, its inhabited planet shattered to pieces in what apparently was a civil war using gravity warping implosive "gravitonic warheads". Even worse, the system had not been reclaimed by the Imperium as it should have (due to its strategically vital location). Reluctantly, they proceed to Defram, where they find merely two barren orbs. Their next visit the planet Keerah in the Kano system; they reason that Defram was simply a Fleet base, and so perhaps a civilian system would have more answers or life.

In Keerah, they are attacked by an automated quarantine orbital system; after disabling it, Colin and his crew discover that the dead planet had fallen victim to a horrific biological warfare agent designed to be effective against all forms of life (by rapidly mutating until a successfully lethal form is obtained), which spread throughout the entire Empire (the form of government having changed in the ensuing thousands of years) too quickly to be contained, thanks to widespread use of a teleportation (or "mat-trans" as it was known) device. Colin makes the fateful decision to go straight to the Bia system and the planet Birhat—the military and political centers of the Empire. This decision means that it would be impossible for them to return to Earth in time to help defeat the scouts.

At Birhat, they discover an enormous number of installations in the system, such as a shield which protects not merely the planet of Birhat, but the entire inner system. After successfully picking his way through a labyrinth of emergency programming protecting "Mother" (the master computer overseeing the Fleet and the Bia system), Colin resorts to ordering Mother to implement "Case Omega"—an order which, unbeknownst to him, appoints the senior surviving Fleet official and civil servant as Emperor. This unexpected elevation has the happy side effect of granting Colin control of the Imperial Guard Flotilla: 78 planetoids, each vastly more powerful than Dahak (but also vastly stupider). The crew of Dahak immediately sets to work reactivating and repairing the planetoids so they can return to Earth.

=== Book 2 ===
Book 2 begins with a different point of view; the subject is now a minor Achuultani tactical officer named Brashieel, attached to the scout forces about to drop out of hyperspace and destroy Earth. However, the Achuultani warships are extremely slow in hyperspace, and the Earth defenders use their several hours of advance notice to prepare an ambush in the outer system. The ambush, while successful (because of the element of surprise and the generally superior Imperial technology), nevertheless sets the tone for the rest of the Siege by being extremely bloody on both sides.

During the months that Colin's crew in Birhat labor to get the Imperial Guard up and running, the scouts duel the Earth forces, hurling asteroid after asteroid at the shield while whittling down the fortresses and ships, all in preparation for their final blow: hurling the entire moon of Iapetus down the gravity well of Sol at high speed, and aimed directly at Earth. Seven months after the first battle, the "Hoof" (as the Achuultani term their immense kinetic weapon) is about to impact Earth, piercing through the weakened defenders "like a bullet through butter". At the last moment, the Imperial Guard arrives and as they drop out of hyperspace, blasts the Achuultani escort and the moon into dust using gargantuan gravitonic warheads.

Unfortunately, all is not well. Dahak recovers from some wreckage computer records about the main Achuultani force: some 3 million vessels more powerful than the scouting vessels, intended to back up the various scout forces. Somewhat fortunately, this invincible force has divided up into at least two fleets, and so Colin develops a plan to exploit the Enchanach Drive's somewhat awkward side effect of accidentally causing stars to go nova (due to the gravitonic shear stress of drive activation too near a star). With the Imperial Guard, they lay an ambush for the first fleet, having intercepted its courier, and lure it into an otherwise unremarkable star system. There they briefly engage the Achuultani (to ensure they are sucked far enough into the system, past the hyperlimit that they cannot escape, and to gather some more military information); the opposing fleet's having stepped into Colin's "mousetrap", the Enchanach Drives of eight planetoids simultaneously activate, inducing a supernova which obliterates Sorkar's forces.

The second trap does not go as well. Like in the first, the Guard ambushes the second force (this time laying a dense field of hypermines, which account for a quarter of the million Achuultani vessels), but some of Sorkar's couriers had escaped and warned Hothan's fleet of the nova trap, so that stratagem was unusable. Instead, Colin traps Hothan's forces in normal space (again, using the Enchanach Drive's side effect to exploit the hyperdrive's limitation of being unable to work in a sufficiently deep gravity well). With a good deal of luck and a well-timed planetoid assault on the flank, the Achuultani command structure disintegrates and they are routed.

Once again, Colin's forces are elated by their success and what they believe to be a crushing victory ending the Achuultani "Great Visit", and once again Dahak discovers ominous news in the wreckage of the Achuultani command ship: the final segment of 200,000 vessels much more capable than the previous ones, had been held in reserve, and would shortly attack Earth (they having deduced its location from the timing of Colin's attacks) if the Guard did not stop them. The odds are against their depleted, battered ships lacking fresh supplies of hypermines, but they have little choice. The battle goes poorly, and they win thanks only to a suicide plunge by Dahak, in which Dahak hacks into and kills the computer truly in charge of the Great Visit. This is so effective because it had been previously discovered that the explanation for the various Achuultani anomalies (their lack of females, the oddly inconsistent state and stasis of their technology, their constant war making and hyper-xenophobia etc.) was that their civilization had been greatly distorted many millions of years ago, and they had entrusted the survival of their species to a computer roughly the equal of Dahak. That computer turned out to have the personality flaw of ambition, and deliberately perpetuated the state of war it needed to justify to its programming its continued tyrannical control. With the death of Dahak and BattleComp, the Achuultani fleet panics, flees, and is destroyed or captured.

As it turns out, Dahak had successfully copied himself to another planetoid, and so survived in essence. And a message from Earth, explaining that Isis Tudor had decoded enough of the Achuultani genetic structure for an eventual prospect of cloning a female Achuultani—the first free female for millions of years. Against this hopeful note and the prospect of a war of liberation to free the rest of the Achuultani from the control of the master computer, the novel ends.

== General and cited references ==
- The Armageddon Inheritance, David Weber; first published December 1993 by Baen Books. ISBN 978-0-671-72197-8
