= The Shadow of the Lion =

2002 novel by Mercedes Lackey

- Author: Mercedes Lackey, Dave Freer, Eric Flint
- Language: English
- Genre: Alternate history, Fantasy
- Publication date: 2002
- Publication place: United States

The Shadow of the Lion is an alternate history/historical fantasy novel set primarily in the Republic of Venice in the 1530s. It is a part of the Heirs of Alexandria series. The book was written by Mercedes Lackey, Eric Flint and Dave Freer and combines elements from the styles of all three authors, such as Lackey's approach to tolerance and magic and Flint's sense of history alteration. The book was published in various e-book formats in the Baen Free Library and on Baen CD #01 (Honorverse).

== Characters ==
- Aldanto, Ceasare: Milanese sell-sword and spy.
- de Chevreuse, Francesca: Most powerful courtesan in Venice, formerly of Orleans.
- Garavalli, Maria: A sharp-tougued canaler, one of the most feared women in the canals.
- Hakkonsen, Eric: An Icelander, bodyguard and mentor to Manfred.
- Jagiellon: Grand Duke of Lithuania, possessed by the demon Chernobog.
- Lopez, Eneko: A Basque cleric and ecclesiastical magician. (Ignatius of Loyola)
- Manfred, Earl of Carnac, Marquis of Rennes, Baron of Ravensburg: Nephew of the Holy Roman Emperor.
- Marina, Dottore Luciano: Strega Grand Master, wearer of the Winged Mantle.
- Montescue, Katerina (Kat): Heiress to the bankrupt House Montescue, she works as a smuggler.
- Valdosta, Benito: Grandson of the Duke of Ferrara and a pickpocket while in hiding.
- Valdosta, Marco: Grandson of the Duke of Ferrara and a skilled doctor (when trained) and powerful mage, he is the heir to House Valdosta and the Lion Crown.
- Winged Lion of Venice: The city's ancient guardian, which answers only to the wearer of the Winged Mantle.

== History ==
=== Point of divergence ===
In our own universe, Hypatia of Alexandria was killed for her non-Christian views, shortly before the destruction of the Library by an angry mob. In this universe, Hypatia was converted to Christianity by John Chrysostom, and stopped the mob from destroying the Library. She continued her correspondence with John and St. Augustine, which eventually led to the modern (1530s) divisions of the Church. The Library was a great storehouse of magical knowledge—the inference being that the information was lost to us in this universe when the Library was destroyed. In this universe, while magic is not commonplace its existence is no secret to the general populace and is practiced by those with the inborn power and/or discipline to use it. Notably, the clergy utilize elemental magic.

=== Church in Europe ===
==== Petrines ====
Led by the Grand Metropolitan in Rome, the Petrine branch of the Church (named for St. Peter and built on the teachings of Hypatia and Chrysostum) is the creed of choice in Italy and Spain, with a relatively large following in Aquitaine. The Petrines are noted for taking a mediative role in politics and a more tolerant attitude to other faiths.

==== Paulines ====
Most of central and northern Europe follow the Pauline creed (named for St. Paul and based on the writings of St. Augustine). The Paulines are recognized for a general intolerance to all non-Christians, though some members of the Church are more politic about it than others. There is no official head of the Pauline church, though the Holy Roman Emperor is the "Bulwark of the Faith".

== Great Powers of Europe ==
=== Italy ===
- Ferrara: Like Venice, the Ferrarese are politically non-aligned, and they serve as agents to both the Empire and the Grand Metropolitan. Duke Enrico Dell'Este, grandfather of Marco and Benito, is known as the Old Fox.
- Genoa: The only rivals of the Veneze on the open seas, in terms of both trade and navy.
- Milan: The Milanese and the Visconti house are the leaders of the Motagnards, who are bent on the Empire annexing northern Italy. They are oblivious to the fact that this is the last thing the Empire wants. Caesare Aldanto hails from Milan.
- Venice: The most trade-oriented and tolerant city in Europe.
- Verona: Venice's land-based rival

=== Others ===
- Aquitaine: A realm that encompasses most of our universe's France and England. Francesca de Chevreuse hails from the southern capital, Orleans.
- Grand Duchy of Lithuania and Poland: Dominating most of eastern Europe, the Duchy is ruled by the iron fist of Grand Duke Jagiellon, who is possessed by the demon Chernobog.
- Holy Roman Empire: Ruling over all of central Europe, including Austria, Germany, and Denmark, the Empire is the most powerful nation in Europe, and adheres to the Pauline creed. Manfred of Brittany is an heir to the Empire, currently ruled by Charles Fredrik Hohenstauffen.
- League of Armagh: A coalition of Celtic states, most of their territory lies in the British Isles. Manfred of Brittany is the heir to a part of the League as well as the Empire.

== The novels ==
- The Shadow of the Lion by Mercedes Lackey, Eric Flint & Dave Freer

ISBN 978-0-7434-3523-9 ISBN 0-7434-3523-0 Copyright© 2002

- This Rough Magic by Mercedes Lackey, Eric Flint & Dave Freer

ISBN 978-0-7434-7149-7 ISBN 0-7434-7149-0 Copyright© 2003
Webscription electronic version

- A Mankind Witch by Dave Freer

ISBN 978-0-7434-9913-2 ISBN 0-7434-9913-1 Copyright© 2005
Webscriptions electronic version

- Much Fall of Blood by Mercedes Lackey, Eric Flint & Dave Freer

ISBN 978-1-4391-3351-4 ISBN 1-4391-3351-4 Copyright© 2010
Webscriptions electronic version

- Burdens of the Dead, by Mercedes Lackey, Eric Flint, and David Freer.

ISBN 978-1476736686 Copyright 2014

- All the Plagues of Hell, by Eric Flint and Dave Freer.

ISBN 978-1481483612. December 2018
