= John Moore (American author) =

American engineer and writer

- Born: June 15, 1959 (age 67); Pennsylvania, US
- Occupation: Writer
- Writing career
- Period: 1986–present
- Genres: Fantasy, science fiction

John F. Moore (born June 15, 1959) is an American engineer and a writer of fantasy and science fiction primarily under the short name John Moore.

== Biography ==
John Moore grew up in a suburb of Philadelphia. After high school, he moved to Texas and attended the University of Houston at night. He spent ten years working towards a diploma in chemical engineering. While studying he worked in the oilfields and as a truck driver, and began his writing career. In 1989 he finally received his engineering degree and began working as an engineer. He lived and worked in Houston, Texas as of 2014.

== Works ==
At college Moore became interested in Isaac Asimov's Science Fiction Magazine, and after a year decided to write a story and send it to the magazine. It was not accepted, but he did receive a letter from assistant editor Darrell Schweitzer from which he learned of fanzine and science fiction conventions. Moore joined the Fandom Association of Central Texas (FACT), began attending workshops for writers participating in the Writers of the Future contest, and wrote his first serious fiction.

Moore's early stories were mostly science fiction thrillers. These include the techno-thriller Heat Sink, written in 1991 but only published in 2010 as an e-book. It describes a near future in which Canadian and Russian scientists try to melt the polar ice to gain access to new oil fields. Moore's earliest published story in the ISFDB catalog is "Bad Chance", a two-page item in the January 1986 issue of Space and Time. His short works have also seen print in Aboriginal SF, New Destinies, Realms of Fantasy, Marion Zimmer Bradley's Fantasy Magazine, Tomorrow, Writers of the Future, and elsewhere.

Beginning with Slay and Rescue (1993), most of Moore's longer works have been light, humorous fantasies set in the mythical "Twenty Kingdoms." These have been compared to the writings of Terry Pratchett and Robert Asprin. He was influenced to use humor in his fiction by comedian Bill Hicks when both were students at the University of Houston. At the Comedy Workshop, Moore studied the techniques of performers like Hicks, Sam Kinison, and Ellen DeGeneres to develop his own sense of comic timing and pacing.

His fantasies have been published in a number of languages other than English, notably German, Czech and Russian. The Czech version of his novel The Unhandsome Prince was actually published before the first edition in English. As for his other novels, Slay and Rescue is available in all three languages; The Unhandsome Prince in Czech and Russian, and Heroics for Beginners in Czech and German. Heroics for Beginners and Bad Prince Charlie were also published in Poland.

== Works ==
The Internet Speculative Fiction Database (ISFDB) is a source for all listings except where noted otherwise.

=== Novels ===
==== The Twenty Kingdoms ====
- Slay and Rescue (1993), ISBN 0-671-72152-6
- The Unhandsome Prince (Czech edition 2004; US edition 2005) ISBN 0-441-01287-6
- Heroics For Beginners (2004), ISBN 0-441-01193-4
- Bad Prince Charlie (2006), ISBN 0-441-01396-1
- A Fate Worse Than Dragons (May 2007), ISBN 0-441-01495-X

==== Other novels ====
- Heat Sink (2010)
- The Lightning Horse (2014) ISBN 978-1937105679

=== Short stories ===
- "Bad Chance" (Space and Time, #69, Winter 1986) (as by John F. Moore)
- "Sight Unseen" (Aboriginal SF, October 1986)
- "Trackdown" (Aboriginal SF, February–March 1987) (as by John F. Moore)
- "Lineage" (Salarius: New Age Science Fiction and Fantasy Talent, May 1987) (as by John F. Moore)
- "Freeze Frame" (New Destinies, Volume VI, Winter 1988)
- "If Jesus Loves You" (Nøctulpa #3, February 1988)
- "High Fast Fish" (L. Ron Hubbard Presents Writers of the Future, Volume IV, June 1988)
- "Mindset" (Beyond #14, 1989) (as by John F. Moore)
- "Bio-Inferno" (Starshore, Summer 1990)
- "The Great Pickle Caper" (Starshore, Fall 1990)
- "A Match on the Moon" (Figment #3, April 1990)
- "The Worgs" (Marion Zimmer Bradley's Fantasy, Summer 1990) (as by John F. Moore)
- "Hell on Earth" (Aboriginal Science Fiction, January–February 1991)
- "Sacrificial Lamb" (Aboriginal Science Fiction, Summer 1992)
- "A Job for a Professional" (Tomorrow Speculative Fiction, October 1993)
- "Excerpts from the Diary of Samuel Pepys" (Realms of Fantasy, April 1995)
- "Doorway to Hell" (The Anthology from Hell: Humorous Tales from WAY Down Under, March 2012)
- "High Noon Zombies" (Flush Fiction, Volume II: Twenty Years of Letting It Go!, May 2016)

=== Nonfiction ===
- "Wastelandian Symbolism in Rory Harper's Petrogypsies" (1989)
- "An Archaeology of the Future: Ursula Le Guin and Anarcho-Primitivism" (1995)
- "Shifting Frontiers: Mapping Cyberpunk and the American South" (1996)
- "Miracle Stalker: Personal and Social Transformation in Arkady and Boris Strugatsky's Roadside Picnic" (1997)
