= New Destinies =

Paperback science fiction magazine

First edition Cover art by David A. Cherry

New Destinies, Vol. VI/Winter 1988—Robert A. Heinlein Memorial Issue, edited by Jim Baen, (Baen Books, ISBN 0-671-69796-X).

This issue of The Paperback Magazine of Science Fiction and Speculative Fact was published after the death of Robert A. Heinlein earlier that year. It contains a few of his stories, several tributes, and two poems of his that were never published before. Additionally there are other short stories by several writers.

The table of contents:

- "In Appreciation: Robert A. Heinlein" by Jerry Pournelle
- "The Long Watch" by Robert A. Heinlein
- "Dance Session": poem by Robert A. Heinlein
- "Rah Rah R.A.H." by Spider Robinson
- Excerpts from The Notebooks of Lazarus Long by Robert A. Heinlein
- "Robert A. Heinlein and the Coming Age of Space" by Rick Cook
- More Excerpts from The Notebooks of Lazarus Long by Robert A. Heinlein
- "The Man Who Traveled in Elephants" by Robert A. Heinlein (Heinlein's favorite story)
- "Farewell to the Master" by Dr. Yoji Kondo and Dr. Charles Sheffield
- "The Witch's Daughters": poem by Robert A. Heinlein

Other stories:

- "Copyright Violation" by Spider Robinson
- "The Blabber" by Vernor Vinge
- "Counting Up": essay by Charles Sheffield
- "Megaphone" by Rick Cook
- "Freeze Frame" by John Moore
- "King of All" by Harry Turtledove
