= Wind Rider's Oath =

2004 fantasy novel by David Weber

First edition (publ. Baen Books) Cover artist: Clyde Caldwell

Wind Rider's Oath is a fantasy novel by American writer David Weber, the third book in the "War God" series. It follows the adventures of Bahzell Bahnakson and his friend Brandark. The format is a swords-and-sorcery land with dwarves, elves, humans, halflings and hradani - the 5 Races. There is a pantheon of Gods, some good and some vile. It is followed by Sword Brother, a novella published together with a January 2007 edition of Oath of Swords, the second book in the series.

== Plot ==
At the end of The War God’s Own, Bahzell had accepted the surrender of the much larger force commanded by the Sothoii Baron Tellian. Bahzell, Brandark and Kaeritha are now visiting the Baron's castle from which the baron rules a large portion of the Sothoii Empire. The surrender by Baron Tellian has caused political unrest within the Sothoii nation as does the presence of Bahzell and his entourage of Hradani, members of most recent chapter of the War God's monks.

Bahzell and his fellow Hradani run to the aid of the remnant of a herd of Coursers who were attacked by minions of one of the evil gods. For centuries these phenomenal, sentient horses have been revered by the Sothoii. They sometimes form lifelong mental links with a few select Sothoii warriors who are then known as "Windriders". Bahzell is the first non-Sothoii to become a windrider and rides a Courser who, like Bahzell, has become a champion of the war god. This, along with the obvious effort and sacrifice the Hradani have made to save the Coursers does much to alleviate the political tensions.

Meanwhile, Kaeritha, another war god champion, obeys her call to the Sothoii Warmaids, who are keen that there is no diminution of their legal rights. The devotees of the vile gods continue - as a third strand of their long-planned attack on the Sothoii - to manipulate and attack in Baron Tellian’s own lands.

== Characters ==
- Bahzell Bahnakson of the Horse Stealer hradani. The son of Bahnak, the prince of Hurgrum, the first hradani champion of Tomanak in more than 1,200 years.
- Brandark Brandarkson of the Bloody Sword hradani.
- Kaeritha, a champion of Tomanak who joins Bahzell in his effort to defeat Sharna.
- Tomanāk Orfro, God of War and Justice.
