= The General series =

Military science fiction by S. M. Stirling and David Drake

The General (also known as the Raj Whitehall series, after the lead character) is a set of military science fiction books written by S. M. Stirling from an outline by David Drake.

Inspired by the Byzantine commander Belisarius, the series shares numerous common elements with the more recent Belisarius series by Drake and Eric Flint.

== Books ==
=== Original series ===
Bellevue series

Centering on Raj Ammenda Halgern da Luis Whitehall, written by S. M. Stirling and David Drake.

1. The Forge (1991)
2. The Hammer (1992)
3. The Anvil (1993)
4. The Steel (1993)
5. The Sword (1995)

The first two books were also published as an omnibus Warlord (2003), which was reissued as Hope Reborn (March 2013). The last three in another omnibus as Conqueror (2003). The second two books were published as an omnibus Hope Rearmed (March 2014). The final novel was published with The Chosen in an omnibus as Hope Renewed (July 2014).

=== Follow-on series ===
Visigar series

1. The Chosen (1996) written by S. M. Stirling and David Drake.

This was republished in an omnibus with "The Sword" as Hope Renewed (July 2014).

Hafardine series

1. The Reformer (1999) written by S. M. Stirling and David Drake.
2. The Tyrant (2002) written by Eric Flint and David Drake.

These were republished in an omnibus as Hope Reformed (November 2014).

Duisberg series

1. The Heretic (April 2013; Tony Daniel & David Drake)
2. The Savior (September 2014; Tony Daniel & David Drake)

== Bellevue series ==
=== Plot ===
The first five books are set on the planet Bellevue, previously part of a high-technology galactic civilization (the Federation). Interstellar civilization collapsed during "The Fall", when extensive civil war greatly reduced the planet's technology level. Technology has redeveloped only slowly: the most advanced groups have reached the level of single-expansion steam engines, wrapped-brass-cartridges, breech-loading rifles (Martini-Henry lock or very similar) and lever-action carbines, cast-steel breech-loading cannon, simple revolvers, etc. Progress is slow: the breech-loading rifle design has not changed for over two hundred years, and other groups still use flintlock or percussion cap weapons.

The concept of computer technology has become the basis of religion throughout the world, the Spirit of Man, with priestly Hierarchs, Sysups, and an Inquisition called the Anti-Viral Cleansers. This religion is split into two competing sects: The Spirit of Man of the Stars, the state religion of the Civil Government, and Spirit of Man of This Earth, which is more popular among the barbarian Military Governments. The people of Bellevue speak various evolved dialects, including Sponglish, Spanjol, Namerique and Paytoiz, with elements of English, French and Spanish apparent. At the time of the Fall the planet had no horses, so now cavalry is mounted on thousand-pound dogs of various breeds.

The books begin in the Year of the Fall 1103, when the protagonist Raj Whitehall and his friend Thom Poplanich stumble on a still-working remnant of the old technology, the quantum supercomputer "Center", which Raj and Thom regard as an angel. Center describes itself as a "sentient artificial entity of photonic subsystems tasked with the politico-military supervision" of Bellevue. Center charges Whitehall with uniting Bellevue and provides him, through a constant mental link, with predictive visions that simulate probable situational outcomes, historical data, eidetic memory, and minor enhancements to physical abilities including accuracy with firearms. Raj couples these assets with his own charisma and skill to become an extremely effective military leader. Meanwhile, his wife Suzette quietly uses her own highly developed court intrigue skills to neutralize Raj's political foes and obstacles behind the scenes, compensating for his more direct tactics.

Center keeps Thom in suspended animation within its sanctum, explaining that he will otherwise probably be the victim of political assassination before long, and begins to educate him in matters more related to civil administration. As Raj acknowledges (and Center's projections confirm), he would not be an effective civilian leader, but Thom—the legitimate heir, with the assistance of Raj and Center—will.

True to their historical model, the campaigns of Belisarius, the books focus on the convoluted "strategic offensive, tactical defensive" campaigns of General Whitehall around the Midworld Sea and his fraught relationships with his paranoid but capable 'emperor' –- Governor Barholm Clerett—and Clerett's avaricious and corrupt chancellor Tzetzas.

Whitehall's nation calls itself the Civil Government, and it is centrally located between the rival nations of the Military Governments—The Brigade and The Squadron—and the Muslim Colonists.

=== Characters ===
==== Civil Government ====
===== Raj Whitehall =====
The protagonist of the story, Raj (Raj Ammenda Halgren da Luis Whitehall, Whitehall of Hillchapel, Hereditary Supervisor of Smythe Parish, Descott County) is "chosen" by the Sector Command And Control Mk-XIV Computer he calls Center to unite Bellevue to restore civilization on the planet and save it from a downward spiral that, according to Center's projections, might last as long as fifteen thousand years. On his campaigns, he collects a group of Companions: able commanders who form the ad hoc overall command group of the Whitehall's armies. His campaigns begin on the border of the Civil Government with the Islamic Colony at Sandoral, then go on to the barbarian-controlled Southern Territories of The Squadron and the Western Territories of the Brigade, and culminate in his defense of the Civil Government once more at Sandoral against the Colony's main army. Throughout the series, Raj Whitehall is doubted and suspected of treason by Governor Barholm Clerett, despite continuously proving his loyalty—even after he thwarts an attempt on Clerett's life by ending a coup staged by Thom Poplanich's brother Des and troops led by Colonel Stanson. Also throughout, it is unclear whether he is oblivious to or accepting of his wife's various infidelities.

===== Suzette Whitehall =====
Raj Whitehall's exceptionally intelligent, strong-willed, and resourceful wife, who accompanies him on his campaigns. (Messa Suzette Emmenalle Forstin Hogor Wenqui Whitehall, Lady of Hillchapel) The Wenqui family goes back to the Fall, poor but proud. Suzette is also close friends with Barholm's wife, Lady Anne Clerett, who started out as a child-whore near the Canidrome. Suzette uses any means necessary to convince those potentially harmful to her husband to actually help him, except sleeping with those individuals. She relies on a cadre of devoted servants and spies to gather intelligence in support of her husband's career.

===== Companions =====
The Companions, men loyal to General Whitehall, form the de facto overall command group of Whitehall's Expeditionary Forces, as the Army does not have a structure of command higher than battalion level. Most of them are of the Messer class, the nobility of the Civil Government. The Companions are formed in The Forge when Whitehall is called to an incident in a farmstead during the march to Komar, and Staenbridge, Foley, the Gruders, DaCruz, and M'lewis volunteer to accompany him. Captain Stanson calls them The Loyal Companions in a half-serious jest, and the name sticks.

- Colonel Gerrin Staenbridge (becomes Companion in The Forge)

Second in overall command, Raj Whitehall's right-hand man; directly commands 5th Descott Guards (later "Raj's Own"). Before the series begins, the boredom and idleness of garrison duty had dulled his edge, but he quickly regains it during action in the field. He often acts as Raj's executive officer, shoulder to shoulder with his commander, while directing what amounts to the General's bodyguard regiment.

- Colonel Jorg Menyez (becomes Companion in The Forge)

Overall infantry commander, commands 17th Kelden County Foot. Menyez was forced into the less-prestigious infantry due to his severe allergy to dogs, and is an expert in training and doctrine. Most of the cavalry-oriented officer corps dismisses infantry as broken peons with rifles; Menyez instead demands the same excellence as is expected for dog-soldiers. Much of his service to Raj involves taking just such browbeaten peasants and turning them into soldiers.

- Colonel Grammeck Dinnalsyn (becomes Companion in The Hammer)

Overall artillery commander. Dinnalsyn, like most artillerymen in the Gubernio Civil, is somewhat of an engineer, as he is knowledgeable on matters concerning fortifications and weapons development.

- Muzzaf Kerpatik (becomes Companion in The Forge)

Non-military: a Komarite (Arab) trader who swears loyalty to Raj Whitehall after coming to feel shame for taking part in the dealings of Chancellor Tzetzas, which had led to the weakening of Komar's defenses. He is Raj's main logistics man and the chief steward of the Whitehalls' wealth, as well as brokering information through his commercial contacts in much the same way Suzette uses her political skills.

- Major Kaltin Gruder (becomes Companion in The Forge)

Commands: 7th Descott Rangers. Beginning the series as a company commander of the 5th Descott, he was promoted to command of the 7th Descott after the Valley of Death battle in The Forge. He strongly disapproves of Suzette Whitehall's apparent infidelity to her husband, even after her true devotion is revealed to him by Staenbridge. His personality, never what one might call 'passive', becomes markedly darker after his brother's death and his own facial scarring by the same Colonist shell. Notably, he is also the man Raj trusts most for missions involving independence and speed, often sending him behind enemy lines or out to the flank.

- Major Ehwardo Poplanich (becomes Companion in The Hammer)

Commands: Poplanich's Own. This battalion is recruited from the Poplanich family's estates around East Residence. Ehwardo is cousin to Thom and Des Poplanich, and is killed in The Steel by the Brigade under the walls of Old Residence.

- Captain Evrard Gruder (becomes Companion in The Forge)

Younger brother of Kaltin Gruder. Killed in The Forge by a shell from a Colonial pom-pom, a light field gun with a higher rate of fire and smaller shells than the Civil Government's. His personality was very similar to Kaltin's, both of them quick to violence in Raj's service, with a taste for women and the finer things.

- Captain Barton Foley (becomes Companion in The Forge)

Commands: A Company, 5th Descott Guards. Loses his left hand in The Forge to a pom-pom shell; he replaces it with a sharpened hook. Foley is Gerrin Staenbridge's protege-cum-boyfriend, and is fond of literature. Before every major battle in the field, Foley gives the following toast to end staff meetings: "He fears his fate too much, and his desserts are small, he who will not put it to the touch --- to win or lose it all.". Foley's interest in literature will garner him an award for his book, Raj Whitehall and His Times, which he writes after Thom Poplanich is enChaired as Governor and Center declares the Fall to be ended.

- Senior Captain Antin M'lewis (becomes Companion in The Forge)

Commands: 5th Descott Guards' Scout Unit (The Forty Thieves). Hailed from Bufford Parish, the most lawless part of not-so-lawful Descott County. Distinguished by his wire garrote and the skinning knife he carries on his left side, both of which are quick to his hands whenever a point needs to be made. M'lewis meets Raj Whitehall when he is brought before Raj concerning a farmer's pig (or a shoat) gone missing despite a no-foraging order. He gains Raj's confidence and eventually heads a special team of similar characters known as the "40 Thieves", leading them through intimidation and example through scouting missions into enemy territory.

- Major Mekkle Thiddo (becomes Companion in The Hammer)

A junior Lieutenant in the 5th, he was supposed dead in the retreat from El Djem. However, he survives and rises to command the 1st Rogor Slashers at the start of the Southern Territories campaign. Shot and mortally wounded under a truce banner while parlaying with Squadrone Admiral Auburn, at which the head of the Admiral's younger brother was presented to him as evidence of his death. Raj later ordered the crucifixion of all those who took part in the treachery, identified by their personal banners during the parlay, as well as the enslavement of their families.

- Major Tejan M'brust (becomes Companion in The Hammer)

Commands: 1st Rogor Slashers, then 2nd Cruisers. Takes command of 1st Rogor Slashers after death of Mekkle Thiddo in The Hammer; later transferred to the 2nd Cruisers in The Anvil.

- Major Peydaro Belagez (becomes Companion in The Forge)

Commands: 1st Rogor Slashers, after Tejan M'Brust is transferred to 2nd Cruisers. Responsible (with Muzzaf Kerpatik) for the capture of the Squadrones responsible for the murder of Mekkle Thiddo, and their crucifixion at Raj's orders.

- Major Hadolfo Zahpata (becomes Companion in The Hammer)

Commands: 18th Komar Borderers.

- Major Ludwig Bellamy (becomes Companion in The Hammer)

Commands: 1st Cruisers, ex-Squadrone soldiers conscripted into the Civil Government Army. The son of one of the first local warlords to seek allegiance with Whitehall's invasion force.

- Major Teodore Welf (becomes Companion in The Steel)

Commands: 1/591st, 2/591st, 3/591st ex-Brigaderos soldiers conscripted into the Civil Government Army. Formerly second-in-overall-command of the Brigade, a position he shared with Grand Constable Howyard Carstens, under General of the Brigade Ingreid Manfrond.

===== Center =====
Center (Sector Command and Control Unit AZ12-b14-c000 Mk. XIV) is an artificial intelligence attempting to unite planet Bellevue and restore technological civilization, with the intent to later restore faster-than-light travel and then reestablish civilization on the other planets of the collapsed interplanetary federation. Center's original purpose, prior to the collapse of civilization, appears to have been as a system for tactical and strategic command of the "local" military units (the original scope of "local" is never made clear). Center originates with the collapsed Federation and the original Civil Government, and its alignment with the current Civil Government is due simply to the geographical accident of being located below the capital city. Due to the destruction of Center's external sensors (orbiting satellites etc.) during the Fall, Center is limited to data either obtained previously or via the link to Raj Whitehall's senses and thoughts. Center provides constant probabilistic analysis and future projections of the political, social and military situation. This analysis is essential in steering choices away from local optimum, decisions that appear correct at the time but which would lead to eventual disaster. Center also provides historical references to Earth's history that relate to technology and specific relevant historical conflicts.

Center is not merely an assistant; it is clearly the driving force behind Raj Whitehall, using Whitehall's leadership to achieve Center's goals. Initially Whitehall's cooperation is due to superstitious obedience to what he perceives as a supernatural entity, then the relationship becomes increasingly more cooperative as Whitehall understands the true situation and the necessity of his actions.

Center's stated sole motivation is the "betterment of mankind", to bring about the end of war by creating a united society. On Bellevue most people are peasants, the bottom rung in the agrarian economies, due to the mostly feudal and autocratic forms of government; this greatly limits their ability to achieve their full potential. Center plans to bring about stability, technological advancement and democracy, in that order. Mostly analytic and unengaged, Center's comments occasionally have an "emotional" shade, most often in the form of ironic humour.

==== The Colony ====
===== The Settler =====
Absolute despot of The Colony. Required to be perfect in body under Islamic law.

===== Jamal =====
The Settler of The Colony in The Forge; killed during the Battle of Sandoral and his head brought to Raj Whitehall by Skinner Chief Juluk.

===== Ali ibn'Jamal =====
Became Settler after defeating his brother Akbar in a civil war following their father's death. He is cowardly, cruel, capricious, vindictive, and psychotic. Killed, presumably by his brother Tewfik (who brings his head to Raj as a peace offering), in The Sword.

===== Tewfik ibn'Jamal =====
Military commander of The Colony and brother to The Settler; would probably have been The Settler, had not an eye lost in combat disqualified him as imperfect in body. Possibly a more capable combat commander than even Raj Whitehall. Mainly appears in the first and fifth volumes of the series.

=== Nations and Barbarians ===
==== The Civil Government/Gubernio Civil ====
Remnants of those who remained loyal to the Federation and the civilian government capitaled in the city of East Residence; it is the planet's most technologically advanced nation. The Civil Government is governed by a hierarchy of Ministers headed by a single Governor, who is also the head of the Church of Holy Federation and Viceregent of the Spirit of Man. Governors are placed on the chair either by hereditary inheritance or by "shooting their way onto the Chair"—a coup, usually by a successful general, but sometimes a defeated one. This fear of military coups is why the Civil Government has no military structure above the brigade level. This lack of a higher command is one of the reasons why the Civil Government had suffered the loss of the Western and Southern Territories to the Brigade and Squadron respectively over the centuries. Raj Whitehall believes that the Civil Government is the legitimate ruler of all Bellevue. Residents of the Civil Government speak Sponglish, a mangled version of Spanish and English which apparently is descended primarily from Mexican Spanish. This state is modeled on the Byzantine Empire.

==== The Colony ====
Nation established by Islamic/Arab settlers; technologically second only to the Civil Government. The Colonists were the first to arrive on planet Bellevue during the Last Jihad, bearing a fragment of the Kaaba from, as the books describe, "burning Mecca." The Colonist capital of Al Kebir is the oldest city in the planet. The Colony ruler is The Settler. As in the Civil Government, the right to the throne is settled either by hereditary inheritance or civil war, the latter usually a result of a dispute among multiple heirs to the throne. Those who are not whole in body (i.e. missing a limb or other body part) are ineligible to claim the throne, which is why Tewfik ibn'Jamal cannot become Settler: he lost an eye in the Zanj campaigns. Residents of the Colony speak Arabic. This state is modeled on the Sassanid Empire of Belisarius's time.

Other Muslims also exist; Abdullah Al'aziz is a Druze whose life and family are saved by Suzette Whitehall, and who repays her by serving as her chief spy.

==== The Brigade/Brigaderos ====
Barbarian Military Government established by the descendants of the 591st Provisional Brigade; the most technologically advanced of the Military Governments. The Brigade, having moved from south their original lands, referred to as the "Base Area", has ruled the former Civil Government Western Territories for six hundred years. All male members of the Brigade are referred to as "Unit Brothers". The ruling or noble class of the Brigade (referred to as "brazazz" or "brass ass") bear titles that refer to the Brigade's former military organization based on officer ranks, such as "Hereditary Captain" or "Hereditary Colonel." The Brigade is ruled by hereditary king with the title of "General of the Brigade". The General may be disposed by impeachment if called for and voted on by the members of noble class at an assembly at arms.

The Brigade, unlike the Squadron, maintains a standing army with a system of compulsory service, as well as requiring nobles to contribute household troops in time of war. Brigade forces use rifle-muskets, which are primitive compared to the Armory breech-loaders used by the Civil Government Army. All Brigaderos carry a basket-hilt broadsword in conjunction with cap and ball revolvers. The Brigade does not field infantry, but only cavalry and a few brass or bronze cast siege cannon. Cavalry units are split between mounted dragoons and lancers, who also carry two-meter long lances. Brigadero soldiers wear front-and-back breastplates, which are resistant to the hollow-point lead bullets fired by Civil Government rifles; this leads the Civil Government army to switch to brass-tipped bullets to puncture such armor. Residents of The Brigade speak the dialects of Spanjol and Namerique, remnants of Spanish and French/English respectively. This state is modeled on the Ostrogoths of Belisarius's time.

==== The Squadron / Squadrones ====
Barbarian Military Government established by the descendants of the 2nd Cruiser Squadron. Despite having conquered the Civil Government Southern Territories some 200 years ago, and resisting at least one prior Civil Government expedition to retake the lost Territories, the Squadron is less developed than the Brigade, and with a more maritime orientation. Ruled by a hereditary king, bearing the title of "Admiral," the Squadron does not have a standing army, but in times of war calls forth the "war levy" composed of all male Squadron members of fighting age. Armed with flintlock muskets, blunderbusses, axes and broadswords, Squadron warriors traditionally fight under household banners or associations and are noted for delivering frenzied charges into close combat with their foes. The Squadrones can be likened to the Germanic or Norse berserkers, both from physical appearance (they are described as large, pale-skinned and well-built and some with Suebian knots) and from their apparent love for combat; it is shameful in their culture to shun or flee from battle. In Raj Whitehall's campaign in the Southern Territories, the Squadrones literally charge into the fire of the Civil Government field guns and are comprehensively defeated. Residents of the Squadron's lands speak the dialects of Spanjol and Namerique, remnants of Spanish and French/English respectively. This state is modeled on the Vandals of Belisarius's time.

==== The Skinners ====
Barbarian nomads employed by the Civil Government as mercenaries. Notorious anarchists, with a reputation for marksmanship, dog riding, and atrocities. The Skinners speak a mangled mixture of English and French, "Paytoiz". They are reminiscent of the Huns. There are many references to the Skinners coming from French Canada, particularly Quebec. One of the groups is the "Trois Rivière" tribe. There are also examples of French Canadian names. This also explains the mixture of French and English.

==== The Stalwarts and the Guard ====
Namerique-speaking barbarians living on the northern frontiers of the Brigade. More savage than the Brigaderos (the favorite sport of the Stalwarts is said to be fratricide), both groups are beginning to migrate south to escape the Skinners. The Stalwarts and the Guard are modeled after the Lombards and the Franks respectively.

==== The Zanj ====
Little is known of the Zanj City States or its people, other than that Tewfik ibn'Jamal lost his eye while campaigning there, and that it is the source of kave (coffee) and the extremely valuable torofib silk. The Zanj are practitioners of the Baháʼí Faith. This form of worship is particularly offensive to the orthodox Sunni Muslims of The Colony, and perhaps the source and cause of the Zanj Wars.

== Others ==
=== Chosen series ===
In the follow-up novel The Chosen, a copy of Center, along with the recorded mind of Raj Whitehall, is sent to the planet Visager to help boost that society to the point where it too can join what has now become Bellevue's multi-world Federation. This time, Center recruits half-brothers Jeffrey Farr and John Hosten to help remake a world. Standing in their way is a nation of eugenically bred warriors called the Chosen, the strongest, most technologically advanced military force on the planet, who believe that all non-Chosen are merely slaves who haven't been caught yet.

The culture of Visager is predominantly Latin. Only the Chosen's culture differs, with a Prussian military culture, citizens possessing Teutonic names, and a language (Landisch) written as German. The Republic of Santander, despite being an industrialized, democratic, mercantile naval power, maintains some Spanish influence. The Union del Este speaks "Fransay" and boasts cities like "Nantes," "Borreaux," and "Marsai." The Union's political situation resembles 1930s-era Spain. The inhabitants of the Sierra Democratica y Populara speak "Ispanyol," many of whom reside in the capitol of Nueva Madrid. The former superpower on Visager is the Universal Empire, whose culture is clearly Italian. Cities have names like "Corona," "Milana," and "Napoli," while characters have names like Pia del Cuomo and Arturo Bianci.

The novel's setting is based on Europe during the early 20th century, before and after World War I, and on what David Drake considered the reality of S. M. Stirling's Draka universe.

=== Hafardine ===
The Confederacy of Vanbert, once the planet Harfadine's mightiest realm, has fallen to decay and internal corruption. The two books of the Harfadine Series also have Center & Raj in their overseer/advisor roles, assisting Adrian Gellert, whose brother Esmond and father-in-law Verice Demansk also play pivotal roles in restoring civilization to Hafardine. It is based upon the fall of the Roman Republic.

=== Duisberg ===
Duisberg is based on an Ancient Egyptian model. The first book in the new setting became available April 2013. Center & Raj assist Abel Dashian, the son of a military officer, in his attempt to take down a supercomputer that suppresses societal advancement. If Dashian succeeds, then civilization will be allowed to progress on Duisberg.

=== Additional books/outlines ===
There was an outline for a book called The Green Planet, which had implementation problems and was canned. The author states it was "probably a bad idea (no, it wasn't my idea, but I acquiesced); it's unlikely ever to be turned into a novel."

== Reception and analysis ==
The series is classified as military science-fiction, with the theme of "world domination", loosely inspired by the story of the 6th-century Byzantine general Belisarius. The authors of Canadian Fantasy and Science-Fiction Writers write that the books in the series are not repetitive and characters are imaginative, although they criticize the plot for being somewhat predictable and lacking originality. They note that "In spite of the lack of originality in the plot, most reviewers, in light of the superb battle scenes as well as the highly detailed presentation of military tactics, say that this series will appeal to military-science buffs".

A reviewer for Tor.com called the series "one of the better examples" of the military science fiction genre.
