= Robert Buettner =

American science fiction novelist (born 1947)

- Born: July 7, 1947 (age 79); New York City, U.S.
- Occupation: Novelist
- Writing career
- Genre: Science fiction

Robert Buettner (/ˈbjuːtnər/ BEWT-nər) is an American author of military science fiction novels. He is a former military intelligence officer, National Science Foundation Fellow in Paleontology, and has been published in the field of natural resources law. He has written five volumes of the Jason Wander series, three volumes of the Orphan's Legacy series, the stand-alone novel The Golden Gate, multiple short stories and novellas, and the afterword to an anthology of stories by the late Robert Heinlein. Buettner currently lives in Georgia.

== Bibliography ==
=== Novels ===
==== Jason Wander series ====
War Is an Orphanage: Jason Wander, left orphaned at age 17 by an attack from an unseen alien enemy, must fight his own demons before he can fight Earth's. Jason starts off on a self-destructive streak that leads to being expelled from school, through foster homes and finally to an appointment with a no-nonsense judge. As the world begins falling apart, Jason is given the choice of so many others, from an earlier time in American history: join the Army or go to jail. This decision leads to an odyssey of adventures that takes Jason Wander from the pits of despair to the heights of victory. In the spirit of Johnnie Rico and Starship Troopers, Robert Buettner crafts a story that is as much about a young man coming of age as it is about fighting alien creatures.

==== Orphan's Legacy Series ====
In March 2011, Baen Books, distributed by Simon & Schuster, released Overkill, Buettner's sixth novel and first in a new series, which will include at least three books. This series is set a generation after the Jason Wander books and includes characters from the earlier series, both directly and by reference. A continuing theme is the search by the protagonist, Jazen Parker, for his parents.

==== Other ====
The Golden Gate (January 2017, ISBN 978-1-4767-8190-7)

A novel centered around factual developments in human longevity, and its impact on interstellar travel, set in the near future.

My Enemy's Enemy (June 2019, ISBN 9781481484053, trade paperback)

An alternate history of Nazi Germany's nuclear weapons program, as revealed through the contemporary pursuit of a nuclear terrorist bent on starting World War III.

== Critical opinion ==
The Washington Post and The Denver Post favorably compared Buettner's debut novel, Orphanage, to Robert Heinlein's 1959 classic Starship Troopers, to which the author has written that Orphanage is a deliberate literary homage to Robert Heinlein, and also to Joe Haldeman.

Buettner was nominated for the Quill Award for Best New Writer in 2005. Orphanage was nominated for the Quill Award as best science fiction/fantasy/horror novel of 2004, and has recently been described as "one of the great works of modern military science fiction."

Buettner's novel Balance Point was also reviewed favorably.

Publishers Weekly said his 2017 novel, The Golden Gate, "was a lavishly detailed narrative...[that] reverberates with current concerns over life extension [and its] underlying mystery and unpredictability keep the pages turning." The science fiction review Tangent called it an "entertaining, thought-provoking read smartly-told...with just the right touches of SF, history, and science".

== Commercial performance ==
Buettner's first novel, Orphanage, made multiple bestseller lists, including Barnes & Noble's overall paperback Top 50 and the Locus Magazine paperback Top 10. Orphanage was nominated for the Quill Award as best Science Fiction/Fantasy/Horror novel of 2004. Orphanage's publisher (which changed its name from Time Warner Aspect to Little Brown Orbit) reissued Orphanage in April, 2008. As of June, 2008, the book was in its sixth printing.

Orphanage, as well as others of Buettner's novels, has been translated by foreign publishers into Chinese, Czech, French, Japanese, Russian and Spanish, was published in hardcover by the Science Fiction Bookclub, and as an ebook in various formats. Orbit also markets the Jason Wander series in a separate edition geared for the United Kingdom market. The rest of the series is believed to have performed similarly to Orphanage.

Buettner's subsequent series, the Orphan's Legacy series, was a nationally bestselling series. Particularly, the third book, Balance Point, was a Bookscan national bestseller when released in trade paperback in April 2014.
