= Jim Baen's Universe =

Online magazine (2006–2010)

- Website type: Periodical
- Available in: English
- Dissolved: April 2010; 16 years ago
- Owner: Baen Books
- Creators: Eric Flint, Jim Baen, and Mike Resnick
- Website: Archive of website prior to closing in 2010
- Commercial: Yes
- Launched: June 2006; 20 years ago
- Current status: Closed in 2010 and merged into The Grantville Gazettes

Jim Baen's Universe (JBU) was a bimonthly online fantasy and science fiction magazine created by Jim Baen (founder and long-time publisher of Baen Books). It was recognized by the SFWA as a Qualifying Short Fiction Venue. JBU began soliciting materials in January 2006 and launched in June 2006. The magazine contained around 120,000 to 150,000 words per issue. It closed in 2010.

Jim Baen died of a stroke on June 11, 2006, and did not see the magazine's full success. The first and only editor-in-chief was Eric Flint, an author and anthologist. The executive editor was Mike Resnick, a science fiction author, editor and anthologist.

JBU had featured stories from a number of notable authors, including Alan Dean Foster, Gregory Benford, Esther Friesner, and Cory Doctorow. Regular columnists included Eric Flint, Mike Resnick, Barry N. Malzberg, and Stephen Euin Cobb.

Part of the magazine's philosophy was to nurture new authors, slots were reserved in each issue for new writers. Amateur writers were encouraged to submit their work via an online forum, referred to as "e-slush." Stories submitted to e-slush were reviewed by peers and associate editors. The theory was that this process may turn stories that were not quite publishable into publishable ones.

Editor Eric Flint announced in August 2009 that the magazine would close after its April 2010 issue due to insufficient subscriber income.

The magazine still exists as the "Universe Annex" section of The Grantville Gazettes.

== Awards and recognition ==
- Cory Doctorow's "When Sysadmins Ruled the Earth" won the Locus Award for best novelette of 2006.
- Locus cites four novelettes from Jim Baen's Universe in its 2006 Recommended Reading List.
- Hugo Award–winning editor Gardner Dozois selected three stories from Universe to include in his 2007 anthology.
- Mike Resnick's "All the Things You Are" was nominated for (but did not win) the 2007 Hugo Award for Best Novelette

== Reviews ==
Magazine reviewer Debbie Moorhouse, in Greatest Uncommon Denominator, says:

JBU is a massive read. Even at an accelerated pace, with a deadline looming, it took me days to read it all. This is what I want from a magazine: a variety of stories to get my teeth into and some non-fiction to leaven the mixture. The only drawback was that I couldn't take it with me to my usual reading place—it just isn't possible to snuggle up in bed with a computer.

== Electronic distribution ==
JBU is electronic only, and is not available in print (although a hardcover "Best of" collection has been published). It is distributed without digital rights management (DRM). The first half of each story can be read for free, but only subscribers can read the second half. Individual issues can be purchased via Baen Ebooks. Subsequent to the announcement of the closing, subscriptions were modified to provide one year of access to all back issues.
