= Baen Ebooks =

E-book supplier

Baen Ebooks is an e-book supplier operated by Baen Books. It sells e-books for Baen and some other publishers, as well as hosting the Baen Free Library. Unlike most e-book suppliers, it does not use digital rights management (i.e., copy protection). Purchasers can download the same e-book in seven different formats (BBeB, EPUB, HTML, Microsoft Reader Mobipocket, Rocketbook, and RTF), even long after the initial purchase. Their range of genres offered is heavy on science fiction and fantasy.

== Webscriptions ==
Until January 2012, Baen sold e-books through Webscriptions, which was established in 1999. Webscriptions was closely associated with (but apparently legally distinct from) Baen Books. It was owned and operated by Webwrights, a Tennessee company run by Arnold Bailey. Webwrights also ran Baen Books' website and Baen's Bar, a web forum for Baen readers and authors. At first, Webscriptions offered only Baen titles; later, a few other publishers started using Webscriptions after seeing Baen use e-books to significantly increase hardcover sales (for example, by providing the Baen Free Library, which was launched at much the same time as Webscriptions).

In the strictest sense, Webscriptions really referred to a subscription service through which customers got four–six Baen books per month as e-ARC (digital Advanced Readers Copy) releases. Each month, four to six as-yet unpublished works are made available for purchase as a group. The books are released incrementally. Three months before their official release date, only the first half of the books are available for download. Two months before their official release, the first three quarters of the books are available. The complete books are available for download a month before they are released in paper form. While the books are only partially available ("Advanced Readers Copy"), the only download format is HTML. However, once the books are complete, they can be downloaded in all the supported e-book formats. When Webscriptions.net was replaced by BaenEbooks.com, these "WebScriptions" continued under the name "Monthly Baen Bundles". One of the other publishers using Baen Ebooks, Night Shade Books, also sells a monthly bundle. The monthly bundles remained on sale indefinitely. (As of 2013, Baen bundles cannot be purchased once the print books go on sale; all Night Shade bundles are still on sale.)

Baen used Webscriptions for another experiment in online publishing, an online subscription-based science-fiction magazine, Jim Baen's Universe; non-subscribers could purchase single copies through Webscriptions.

== 2012 ==
In January 2012, Baen launched "Baen Ebooks" as a replacement for Webscriptions. Existing customer's accounts and purchases were transferred to the new site.

In December 2012, after making arrangements to sell Baen e-books at vendors such as Amazon.com, Baen increased prices and changed the way Monthly Bundles worked. Prices now depend on whether or not a book is also available in paperback format. Baen Monthly Bundles cannot be purchased after the middle of the preceding month, which is when hard-copy versions of the books usually reach retailers. Older Night Shade bundles are still for sale.

== Principles ==
Baen Ebooks, like its predecessor, does not use DRM (i.e., copy protection), in accordance with Jim Baen's belief that DRM "just made it hard for people to read books, the worst mistake a publisher could make." Eric Flint, writing soon after Baen's death in 2006, noted that "in his fight against DRM, Jim stood alone as a publisher" and argued that Baen Book's success "demonstrated in practice that all the propaganda [in favor of] DRM is, in addition to everything else, so much hogwash even on the practical level of a publishing house's profits and losses."

Jim Baen also believed in giving away e-book versions of older titles in order to sell newer titles, especially later titles in ongoing series. Because the cost of shipping e-books is essentially zero, it is cheaper for a publisher to give away entire books than to buy advertising, leading Baen to establish the Baen Free Library alongside Webscriptions. As Wired noted, the Free Library has "no conditions or strings attached ... not even requiring readers to give their e-mail addresses, which must have the marketing department turning green around the gills." Baen also include with some hardcovers CD-ROMs carrying dozens of the author's earlier books in multiple formats, all DRM-free. Charles N. Brown, whose Locus magazine tracked sales figures, noted in 2001 that "Baen has shown that putting up electronic versions of books doesn't cost you sales. It gains you a larger audience for all of your books. As a result, [Baen have] done quite well."

Jim Baen also established a policy of making all Baen e-books free to the disabled.

=== Baen Ebooks and digital identifiers ===
The Digital object identifier (DOI) system would seem ideally suited to e-books, but Arnold Bailey found that Baen's approach to e-books made proper use of DOIs prohibitively expensive: Baen would have had to purchase a separate DOI for each format of each e-book, plus the partial e-ARC versions. Webscriptions therefore used stock-keeping units (SKUs) and ISBNs, instead. (The DOIs found in some older Baen e-books do not work.)

== Supported e-book formats ==
Baen Ebooks supports seven e-book formats. Purchasers can download an ebook in as many formats as they want, even years after the actual purchase. This list includes a partial list of devices or software which can be used with each format:

Format	Readers include
BBeB	Sony Reader
EPUB	Nook, Lexcycle Stanza
HTML	Web browsers (online or offline)
Microsoft Reader	PCs running Microsoft Windows, smartphones running Windows Mobile
Mobipocket	Amazon Kindle, Palm OS devices
Rocketbook	Rocketbook (an early e-book reader)
RTF	Most word processors
