= Heirs of Alexandria series =

Novel series by Mercedes Lackey, Eric Flint and Dave Freer

Heirs of Alexandria is an alternate history/historical fantasy series introduced in 2002 and set primarily in the Republic of Venice in the 1530s. The books are written by three authors, Mercedes Lackey, Eric Flint and Dave Freer. The books combine elements from the styles of all three authors, such as Lackey's approach to tolerance and magic and Flint's sense of history alteration.

== Plot summary ==
In our own universe, Hypatia of Alexandria was killed for her non-Christian views, shortly before the destruction of the Library of Alexandria by an angry mob. In the universe of the novels, Hypatia was converted to Christianity by John Chrysostom, and stopped the mob from destroying the Library. She continued her correspondence with John and Augustine of Hippo, which eventually led to the modern (1530s) divisions of the Church.

The Shadow of the Lion (2002) deals with Chernobog's attempt to destroy Venice and the awakening of the city's ancient powers. Marco is the main protagonist, while Chernobog acts through several intermediaries.

This Rough Magic (2003) is set in Corfu and features several new antagonists. It is largely centered on Maria and Benito's awakening, Marco having fit comfortably in his new role in Venice. Elizabeth Bartholdy has replaced Chernobog as the major behind-the-scenes villain in the book.

A Mankind Witch (2005) is a solo effort by Freer, and takes place between Shadow of the Lion and This Rough Magic. While Manfred and Eric are major characters, the focus is shifted to a thrall, Cair Aidin, and the Princess of Telemark, Signy. Trolls are the major antagonists of the story.

Much Fall of Blood (2010) follows Manfred and Erik after their journey to Jerusalem. They are attempting to broker an agreement between the Ilkhan and their nomadic cousins, the Golden Horde, which is complicated by disguised agents of Chernobog who wish to ensure no agreement occurs. In parallel, and eventually intersecting, Elizabeth Bartholdy's latest plot seeks to exploit and destroy an ancient supernatural pact between the family line of Prince Vlad of Wallachia and the supernatural powers that live in his domain, and both her nephew Prince Emeric of Hungary and the dark magician Count Mindaug work their own plots subverting hers.

Burdens of the Dead (2013) centers on Benito Valdosta's attempt to stop Chernobog's plots once and for all thanks after the revelations of Much Fall of Blood, through a naval war with Byzantium in an attempt to block a Black Sea fleet under construction for Chernobog from penetrating into the Mediterranean. The crossroads city of Constantinople is the focal point of their war, and the spirit of Hekate, goddess of crossroads and long worshipped in the Bosporus, quickly becomes involved in the war, and kidnapping and sorcery puts Benito's family at risk in an attempt to distract him and weaken the naval offensive. The original working title was Great Doom's Shadow.

All the Plagues of Hell (2018), by Eric Flint & Dave Freer, focuses on the city of Milan. The condottiere Carlo Sforza foils its Duke's attempt to assassinate him, lethally, and takes control of the city. The illegitimate daughter of the dead duke awakens a spirit of plague in an attempt to take control for herself, and magicians across Europe seek the source of their premonitions that a plague is awakening. This is complicated by the arrival in Milan of a notorious black magician, Count Mindaug, who most of the Christian magicians believe is the architect of the plague, by the involvement of Sforza's illegitimate son, Benito Valdosta of Venice, and the antagonism Venice has had for Sforza, and by Sforza's belief that magic is faked and lacks any spiritual or supernatural power.

== Characters ==
The following characters appear in two or more novels in the series:

- Aidoneus: God of the dead.
- Aldanto, Ceasare: Milanese sell-sword and spy.
- Bartholdy, Elizabeth: Hungarian countess and "aunt" to King Emeric, she is hundreds of years old but appears to be in her early twenties. She engages in gruesome blood rituals to keep her youth.
- Bespi, Fortunato: Former Milanese spy, he is reprogrammed by the Strega to act as Marco's bodyguard.
- De Chevreuse, Francesca: Most powerful Courtesan in Venice, formerly of Orleans.
- Dell'Este, Enrico: The Duke of Ferrara and an excellent swordsmith, he is known as the Old Fox, perhaps the craftiest military mind Italy has seen in decades.
- Dorma, Petro: Head of the influential House Dorma, leader of the Lords of the Nightwatch, and a frontrunner for the position of Doge.
- Garavalli, Maria: A sharp-tongued canaler, one of the most feared women in the canals.
- Hakkonsen, Eric: An Icelander, bodyguard and mentor to Manfred.
- Hohenstauffen, Charles Fredrik: Holy Roman Emperor
- Evangelina: A member of the Hypatian order in Venice's St. Hypatia di Hagia Sophia.
- Jagiellon: Grand Duke of Lithuania, possessed by the demon Chernobog.
- Lopez, Eneko: A Basque cleric and ecclesiastical magician, he is perhaps the greatest sacred magician since Hypatia herself.
- Manfred, Prince of Brittany, Earl of Carnac, Marquis of Rennes, Baron of Ravensburg: Nephew of the Holy Roman Emperor, second in line to the throne, and Knight of the Cross.
- Mindaug, Kazimierz: Lithuanian count, advisor to various powers including Jagiellon, Countess Bartholdy, King Emeric, and Carlo Sforza.
- Montescue, Katerina (Kat): Heiress to the bankrupt House Montescue, she worked as a smuggler.
- Montescue, Ludovico: Current leader of House Montescue, having wasted most of his money in a pathetic effort to destroy the Valdostas.
- Sforza, Carlo: A notorious and skilled condottiere known as The Wolf of the North, he is a father of Benito Valdosta, with a long-standing grudge with Duke Enrico Dell'Este over the fate of Benito's mother. Carlo Sforza is substantially based on Francesco Sforza, a historical condottiere who became Duke of Milan in 1450.
- Valdosta, Benito: Grandson of the Duke of Ferrara, a pickpocket while in hiding.
- Valdosta, Marco: Grandson of the Duke of Ferrara and a skilled doctor (when trained) and powerful mage, he is the heir to House Valdosta and the Lion Crown.
- Winged Lion of Venice: The city's ancient guardian, which answers only to the wearer of the Winged Mantle.

== The Church in Europe ==
=== The Petrines ===
Led by the Grand Metropolitan in Rome, the Petrine branch of the Church (named for St. Peter and built on the teachings of Hypatia and Chrysostom) is the creed of choice in Italy and Spain, with a relatively large following in Aquitaine. The Petrines are noted for taking a mediative role in politics and a more tolerant attitude to other faiths.

=== The Paulines ===
Most of central and northern Europe follow the Pauline creed (named for St. Paul and based on the writings of St. Augustine). The Paulines are recognized for a general intolerance to all non-Christians, though some members of the Church are more politic about it than others. There is no official head of the Pauline church, though the Holy Roman Emperor is the "Bulwark of the Faith". The Paulines very closely (with a few exceptions) resemble historical medieval Catholicism in faith, practice and politics.

== Magic ==
=== The Church ===
Most priests and Sisters of the Petrine branch of the Church are trained as magicians in the Vatican or Alexandria. They are typically trained in scrying, healing, and protection, though a number of them have taken up combative magic. The Order of Hypatia is a dedicated group of Petrine priests and Sisters who use magic to heal and protect.

In the Pauline branch, only the Servants of the Holy Trinity are allowed to use magic (a fact which does not stop the Emperor from seeking a second opinion), and all forms of magic not sanctioned by them is heretical.

=== Strega ===
The Strega are magic-users and traditional witches who typically serve a higher purpose. In Venice, the Strega are welcomed, and about a third of the students at the Accademia are Strega or have Strega leanings. The Strega are led by a Grand Master, who is usually a Grimas (one who has mastered all three branches of Stregheria).

=== Others ===
The darker sides of magic are usually the antagonists of the series. The demon Chernobog, for instance, is the main villain, and his magical minions are the source of Venice's troubles. In This Rough Magic, King Emeric of Hungary is a witch, and a sect of sorceresses are the most powerful antagonists (their leader is the infamous Elizabeth Bartholdy). In A Mankind Witch, female Trolls and Alfar are shown to have powerful magic.

== Nations ==
- League of Armagh: A coalition of Celtic and Norse states, most of their territory lies in the British Isles, but there are extensive settlements in Iceland and Vinland (North America). Manfred of Brittany is the heir to a part of the League as well as the Empire.
- Aquitaine: A realm that encompasses most of our universe's France and England. Francesca de Chevreuse hails from the southern capital, Orleans.
- Holy Roman Empire: Ruling over all of central Europe, including Austria, Germany, and Denmark, the Empire is the most powerful nation in Europe, and adheres to the Pauline creed. Manfred of Brittany is an heir to the Empire, currently ruled by Charles Fredrik Hohenstauffen.
- Grand Duchy of Lithuania and Poland: Dominating most of eastern Europe, the Duchy is ruled by the iron fist of Grand Duke Jagiellon, who is possessed by the demon Chernobog.
- Kingdom of Hungary: A brutal kingdom which has control of most of the Balkans. The current king, Emeric, is a warmonger who is not above using witchcraft to achieve his bloodthirsty ends.
- Ilkhan: A vast empire implied to be the result of a merger between the Mongols and the Islamic Caliphate. They are known in Europe as the current rulers of Egypt and the Holy Land, enforcing the peace in Jerusalem by aggressively upholding a policy of religious tolerance. The full extent of their empire is not clear, but includes most of the Middle East and extends deep into Asia.
- Genoa: The only rivals of the Veneze on the open seas, in terms of both trade and navy.
- Milan: The Milanese and the Visconti house are the leaders of the Motagnards, staunch Paulines who are bent on the Empire annexing northern Italy. They are oblivious to the fact that this is the last thing the Empire wants. Caesare Aldanto hails from Milan.
- Verona: Venice's land-based rival.
- Ferrara: Like Venice, the Ferrarese are politically non-aligned, although they have served as agents for both the Empire and the Grand Metropolitan. Duke Enrico Dell'Este, grandfather of Marco and Benito, is known as the Old Fox.
- Barbary Coast: As in history, a modest land area is controlled by Muslim pirate king-admirals, but unlike the real world history, it is independent, without Ottomans ruling over them. It is ruled by the Redbeards, the Aidin brothers, from their capital Carthage.

=== Venice ===
The most trade-oriented and tolerant city in Europe, Venice is in possession of a large empire in the Mediterranean; in addition to its own home territories in Italy, the city also rules Istria on the Adriatic coast, Crete, the Greek island of Corfu, and unnamed territories in Sicily, Sardinia, and North Africa. The city is also known for its policy of tolerance—it is the only city in Europe where all manner of creeds can live together. Jews and Strega are among the persecuted minorities who find safe haven in the city.

The Republic's government is ruled by numerous bodies and individuals:

- The Doge is elected for a life term from all available candidates in the Senate.
- The Council of Ten are the Doge's cabinet. Membership is a state secret.
- The Lords of the Nightwatch serve as the heads of all "extra-military" matters of the republic, including but not limited to police work, detective work, security and espionage.
- The Senate consists of three hundred dignitaries, merchants, and heads of House.
