= Baen Books =

American science fiction and fantasy publisher

- Founded: 1983
- Founder: Jim Baen
- Country of origin: United States
- Headquarters location: Wake Forest, North Carolina
- Distribution: Simon & Schuster (US); Diamond Book Distributors (UK)
- Key people: Toni Weisskopf
- Publication types: Books
- Fiction genres: Science fiction, fantasy
- Official website: www.baen.com

Baen Books (/ˈbeɪn/) is an American publishing house for science fiction and fantasy. In science fiction, it emphasizes space opera, hard science fiction, and military science fiction. The company was established in 1983 by science fiction publisher and editor Jim Baen. After his death in 2006, he was succeeded as publisher by long-time executive editor Toni Weisskopf.

== History ==
Baen Books was founded in 1983 out of a negotiated agreement between Jim Baen and Simon & Schuster. Simon & Schuster was undergoing massive reorganization and wanted to hire Baen to head and revitalize the science fiction line of its Pocket Books division. Baen, with financial backing from some friends, counteroffered with a proposal to start up a new company named Baen Books and provide Simon & Schuster with a science fiction line to distribute instead.

According to Locus's 2004 Book Summary, Baen Books was the ninth most active publisher in the U.S. in terms of most books published in the genres indicated, and the fifth most active publisher of the dedicated science fiction imprints, publishing a total of 67 titles (of which 40 were original titles). Based on the number of times a title published by Baen Books appeared in the bestseller lists produced by the major bookselling chains, it is ranked the seventh most popular science fiction publisher. In 2005, Baen moved up to the eighth position in the total books published with 72 books published (of which 40 were original titles).

== Electronic publishing ==
Beginning in mid-1999, Baen emphasized electronic publishing and Internet-focused promotions for its publications. The discussions on Baen's bar convinced him to do so. Baen's electronic strategy is explained exhaustively in a series of "letters" or "essays" called The Prime Palaver by Baen Free Library "First Librarian" Eric Flint, but in a nutshell, emphasizes distribution of unencrypted digital versions of its works free of digital rights management copy protection schemes through Baen Ebooks (formerly Webscriptions, which was not formally part of Baen Books, but in effect an independent e-publisher). Baen and his successors believe that DRM does more harm than good to a publisher. Consequently, Baen also makes its entire catalog available in multiple formats for downloading and typically prices electronic versions of its books at or below that of paperback editions—and makes a profit doing it. According to essays on Baen's science fiction e-magazine Jim Baen's Universe, also edited by Flint, the strategy is if anything, getting stronger and more fruitful with the passage of time, especially with the advent of e-book readers such as the Amazon Kindle, and the Barnes & Noble Nook.

=== Baen's Bar ===
Initially, the company invested resources in "Baen's Bar", its online community service that provides a forum for customers, authors, and editors to interact, beginning as a BBS. In the early 2000s, a blogger wrote: "Like every other publisher, Jim Baen set up a website. But several of his authors and fan friends convinced him to put a chat client on his site. Since he was interested, and since several of those authors (like Jerry Pournelle, a former columnist for Byte Magazine, for instance) were very Internet savvy, he did. The chat client grew into an incredibly vibrant community called Baen's Bar."

On February 15, 2021, American author Jason Sanford posted via Patreon "Baen Books Forum Being Used to Advocate for Political Violence". Publisher Toni Weisskopf released a statement.

The moderators are volunteers. The readers, editors, and writers post and interact on the Bar at their own desire. Some conversations have been gone over so many times, they've been retired as simply too boring to contemplate again. Sometimes the rhetoric can get heated. We do not endorse the publication of unlawful speech. We have received no complaints about the content of the Bar from its users.

That said, it has come to our attention that allegations about the Bar have been made elsewhere. We take these allegations seriously, and consequently have put the Bar on hiatus while we investigate. But we will not commit censorship of lawful speech.

It is not Baen Books' policy to police the opinions of its readers, its authors, its artists, its editors, or indeed anyone else. This applies to posts at the Bar, or on social media, on their own websites, or indeed anywhere else. On the Bar, the publisher does not select what is allowed to be posted, and does not hijack an individual's messages for their own purposes. Similarly, the posts do not represent the publisher's opinion, except in a deep belief that free speech is worthy in and of itself.

— Toni Weisskopf

In response to the allegations and the documented evidence provided to them, the DisCon III Convention Committee revoked Toni Weisskopf's Guest of Honor status at the 2021 Worldcon.

DisCon III condemns the violent and hostile content found within Baen Books' forums. We also cannot condone the fact such content was enabled and allowed to ferment for so long. We want to make it clear abusive behavior is not, and will not be, tolerated at DisCon III.

— Bill Lawhorn, Chair, and the Division Heads of DisCon III

Announcing the reopening of Baen's Bar on April 9, 2021, Weisskopf issued a denial of allegations against the forum.

Were there posts that I disagreed with? Yes, some quite strongly. But that's point of free speech. Were there posts which taken out of the context of the discussion they were in could be misconstrued? Yes. I did not see illegal speech even in the most heated discussions. And I did see long-time users step in to calm discussions down—which is what happens in healthy forums.

— Toni Weisskopf

On reopening, the Forum was then made private to members only, with membership restricted to those who make a purchase from the Baen Books website.

The public controversy over Baen's Bar led to former Baen Books author and former Baen's Bar participant Mercedes Lackey to contact Sandford to discuss her own exit. She wanted to respond to why there was a "Posted rule" on Baen's Bar banning discussion of her leaving, which alleged Lackey had a personal grievance against Jim Baen. Sandford posted this as an update to his Patreon post.

Mercedes Lackey reached out to me to say that the information shared on Baen's Bar about why she left was simply not true. She says she left the forum after 9/11 when forum users were posting freely about murdering all Muslims. Lackey strongly attacked these posts in a long post on Baen's Bar, but her post was heavily criticized by Tom Kratman and specifically John Ringo and Ringo's followers. However, Lackey's post and reasons for leaving said nothing about Jim Baen nor about Baen Books. She also says the note posted on the forum banning discussions around her leaving was written after Jim Baen passed, so he would have been unable to contradict it.

— Jason Sanford

=== Baen's Webscriptions ===
In addition to selling individual titles in electronic format, Baen has distributed serialized e-book versions of new books at reduced prices in monthly bundles. Originally called Webscriptions, these Monthly Baen Bundles are scheduled three months in advance of print publication. Webscription.net was implemented by Baen's preferred website expert, Arnold Bailey, who also sold e-books for other publishers. At the start of 2012, the Webscription.net website was redesigned, renamed to Baen Ebooks, and moved to baenebooks.com. Despite the new name, Baen Ebooks continues to sell e-books for other publishers, notably science fiction genre rival Night Shade Books.

Baen's standard setup is based on monthly bundles. Each month, whichever books Baen has coming out in paper (paperback or hardcover, new or reissued) are bundled put together in a fixed price (currently $20) bundle regardless of the number of books (historically 4–9 books, average 5–6). The Monthly Baen Bundles are released in installments beginning three months prior to physical publication. The first installment released three months prior to paper publication includes roughly a half of every book in the bundle, with some books usually included in their entirety. The second installment, two months prior to print publication includes roughly three quarters, and the third installment on the 16th of the month prior to official print release includes the full text. The first two installments are generally available only as HTML, while the last includes all formats supported. Each bundle can only be bought until the 15th of the month prior to official print publication, which is about the time the printed books reach retailers. (Until December 2012, bundles remained on sale indefinitely.)

Another avenue for distribution that Baen uses for some of its new titles is the offering of eARCs (electronic advance reading copies) 3 to 5 months prior to publication. Marketed as a premium product for the fans who absolutely positively have to read it now, they are priced at $15 per single title and can differ from the final text (as they are electronic proofs). After print publication, the "cleaned up and finalized" electronic copy is available both online through the monthly bundle or as a single title (priced variably $7–10, older titles are less).

The electronic versions by Baen are produced in five common formats (HTML, Palm Pilot/Mobipocket/Kindle format, Rocketbook, EPUB/Stanza, Sony LRF, RTF, and MS Reader versions), all unencrypted in drastic contrast to the rest of the e-publishing industries strategy. Jim Baen disliked Adobe's portable document format for reading purposes, but Baen Ebooks offers some non-Baen titles in that format. When customers purchase a title from Baen, they can read it online or download it in any format they want as often as they want. Baen instituted a parallel practice of using promotional CD-ROMs with permissive copyright licenses containing many of its stable of authors' works. Whether downloaded or by CD-ROM, the source material is available in all the formats Baen supports.

The great majority of books published by Baen are still available as e-books, long after the hardcover or paperback versions have gone out of print. This is especially important for midlist titles, which rarely get reprinted. Until December 2012, it was also possible to purchase older monthly bundles.

Baen has made liberal use of free content in its marketing efforts. For example, free sample chapters of its books are typically available on the Baen Web site. The "Baen Free Library" allows free access to dozens of titles from the company's backlist, often the first book published in a series by a Baen author. Baen also provides free electronic copies of its books to readers who are blind, paralyzed, dyslexic, or are amputees.

Baen's emphasis on electronic publishing has generated press coverage for the company. In 2001, Wired magazine described Webscriptions as "innovative". Charles N. Brown, publisher of Locus magazine, has praised Baen's approach in an interview in The New York Times, saying "Baen has shown that putting up electronic versions of books doesn't cost you sales. It gains you a larger audience for all of your books. As a result, they've done quite well."

=== Magazine experiments ===
Baen's first run at magazine-style book publishing took place in the late 1970s, in the form of Destinies, a quarterly 'bookazine' that featured fiction and non-fiction by well-known and new authors that Baen was promoting. It was published by Ace, where Baen was employed at the time. Under the aegis of Baen Books in the 1980s, he published two more bookazine series. The first was Far Frontiers. The second was New Destinies, edited by Baen, Elizabeth Mitchell, and Michael A. Banks.

==== The Grantville Gazettes ====
Baen's began the experimental publication of The Grantville Gazette, an e-magazine anthology series specifically related to the popular Ring of Fire alternate history plenum. The Gazettes are professionally edited and approved fan fiction. They are published on a regular schedule and available individually at Baen Books or Amazon, or by subscription.

==== Jim Baen's Universe ====
In the early 2000s, Baen tried magazine-like publishing again, establishing two self-sustaining e-zine enterprises with a separate staff for each, both spearheaded by Eric Flint: Jim Baen's Universe and the Grantville Gazette series, which was reconfigured after Grantville Gazette V.

The general audience speculative fiction anthology Baen's Universe is available only online. At approximately 120,000 words, this latter publication is unusually large when compared to most traditional print editions of science fiction magazines, and the average size of the newly reconfigured Gazettes is similarly generous.

=== Baen Digital Object Identifiers (DOI) ===
From 1999 to 2011, Baen's e-books were produced by Webscriptions under contract for Baen Books in various (at least five) common digital formats. Because these multiple formats complicate the issue of identifying electronic versions, Baen and Webscriptions did not use DOIs to identify their e-books (even though some of their books had DOIs). The electronic e-ARC practices also complicate things in "publications dates", since the first released text starts two to three months before the release of the print copy, though the released text is not guaranteed to fully copy edited—and so occasionally differs from the final released fully copy-edited versions. Thus, like the Grantville Gazettes the e-publication date antedates the print copy by about two months—the interval before the release of the last third and the hardcover print edition is simultaneously released.

== Authors and works ==
=== Authors ===
Authors whose works have been published by Baen include the following:

- Poul Anderson
- Catherine Asaro
- Robert Asprin
- Robert Buettner
- Lois McMaster Bujold
- D. J. Butler
- Paul Chafe
- C. J. Cherryh
- Larry Correia
- L. Sprague de Camp
- Virginia DeMarce
- Andrew Dennis
- Ann Downer
- David Drake
- Eric Flint
- Dave Freer
- Esther Friesner
- Gregory Frost
- Robert A. Heinlein
- P. C. Hodgell
- James P. Hogan
- Sarah A. Hoyt
- Howard Andrew Jones
- Tom Kratman
- Mercedes Lackey
- Sharon Lee
- Jane Lindskold
- Holly Lisle
- Steve Miller
- Elizabeth Moon
- Larry Niven
- Andre Norton
- Jody Lynn Nye
- Jerry Pournelle
- John Ringo
- Spider Robinson
- Joel Rosenberg
- Christopher Ruocchio
- Michael Shea
- Charles Sheffield
- S. M. Stirling
- Travis S. Taylor
- Brad R. Torgersen
- Harry Turtledove
- Mark L. Van Name
- David Weber
- Karl Edward Wagner
- K. D. Wentworth
- Steve White
- Michael Z. Williamson
- Timothy Zahn

=== Series ===
Series published by Baen include the following:

- 1632 series/Ring of Fire series
- The Bard's Tale: A series of books based on the RPG computer game series of the same name.
- Belisarius series: The premise of this science fiction (more specifically alternate history) series is that a war between two competing societies in the future spills over to 6th century Earth.
- Bolo
- Chicks in Chainmail: A series of anthologies centered on this theme, edited by Esther Friesner.
- Freehold War
- Heroes in Hell
- Honorverse (Honor Harrington)
- Legacy of the Aldenata
- Liaden universe
- The Man-Kzin Wars: A shared universe based on the Kzinti Conflicts in Larry Niven's Known Space universe, featuring writers personally selected by Niven
- March Upcountry Series
- Raj Whitehall
- Vorkosigan Saga
- War Between the Provinces
- Wing Commander: Baen published seven Wing Commander novels from 1992 to 1999 (starting with Freedom Flight by Mercedes Lackey and Ellen Guon, and ending with False Colors by William R. Forstchen and Andrew Keith), including the novelizations of two of the games, Wing Commander III: Heart of the Tiger and Wing Commander IV: The Price of Freedom.
