= David Drake bibliography =

A list of list of works by or about American military science fiction and fantasy writer David Drake.

== Novels (series) ==
=== ARC Riders ===
With Janet Morris

- ARC Riders (1995)
- The Fourth Rome (1996)

The ARC Riders are an elite time traveling force, dedicated to preserving history as it is, preventing (or reversing) any attempt by "Revisionist" time-travelers to change it, and severely punishing any Revisionists who they catch.

=== Belisarius series ===
Written by Eric Flint. Drake contributed to the outlines only, but is listed as a co-author from the publisher.

- An Oblique Approach (1998)
- In the Heart of Darkness (1998)
- Destiny's Shield (1999)
- Fortune's Stroke (2000)
- The Tide of Victory (2001)
- The Dance of Time (2006)

=== The Books of the Elements ===
1. The Legions of Fire (2010)
2. Out of the Waters (2011)
3. Monsters of the Earth (2013)
4. Air and Darkness (2015)

=== Car Warriors ===
- The Square Deal (1992), nominally set in Steve Jackson Games's Car Wars universe.

=== Citizen ===
With John Lambshead

- Into the Hinterlands (2011)
- Into the Maelstrom (2015)

=== Crisis of Empire series ===
Each volume has a different co-author.

- An Honorable Defense (1988)—with Thomas T. Thomas
- Cluster Command (1989)—with William C. Dietz
- The War Machine (1989)—with Roger MacBride Allen
- Crown of Empire (1994)—with Chelsea Quinn Yarbro

=== The General series ===
Written by S. M. Stirling. Drake contributed to the outlines only, but is listed as a co-author by the publisher.

World of Bellevue

- The Forge (1991)
- The Hammer (1992)
  - Warlord (2003)—Omnibus edition
  - Hope Reborn (Mar 2013)—Omnibus edition
- The Anvil (1993)
- The Steel (1993)
  - Hope Rearmed (Dec 2013)-Omnibus edition
- The Sword (1995)
  - Conqueror (2003)—Omnibus edition

World of Visager

- The Chosen (1996)

World of Hafardine

- The Reformer (1999)
- The Tyrant (2002)—written by Eric Flint
  - Hope Reformed (Nov 2014)–Omnibus edition

World of Duisenberg

- The Heretic (April 2013, Baen Books)—written by Tony Daniel
- The Savior (September 2014)

=== Hammer's Slammers ===
- Hammer's Slammers (1979)
- Cross the Stars (1984)
- At Any Price (1985)
- Counting the Cost (1987)
- Rolling Hot (1989)
- The Warrior (1991)
- The Sharp End (1993)
- The Voyage (1993)
- The Tank Lords (1997)—Includes Under the Hammer, Rolling Hot, Night March, Code-Name Feirefitz & The Tank Lords.
- Paying the Piper (2002)
- The Complete Hammer's Slammers Volume 1 (2005)—Omnibus edition; includes all the short stories.
- The Complete Hammer's Slammers Volume 2 (2006)—Omnibus edition; includes At Any Price, Counting the Cost, Rolling Hot, The Warrior
- The Complete Hammer's Slammers Volume 3 (2007)—Omnibus edition; includes The Sharp End, Paying the Piper, The Darkness

=== The Harriers ===
- The Noble Savages (1993), novella in the Harriers shared world setting created by Gordon R. Dickson; first published in the anthology Blood and War (1993) edited by Dickson, reprinted in Drake's collection All the Way to the Gallows (1996)

=== Heroes in Hell ===
- Explorers in Hell (1989)—with Janet Morris

=== Lord of the Isles ===
1. Lord of the Isles (1997)
2. Queen of Demons (1998)
3. Servant of the Dragon (1999)
4. Mistress of the Catacombs (2001)
5. Goddess of the Ice Realm (2003)
6. Master of the Cauldron (2004)

Crown of the Isles

1. The Fortress of Glass (2006)
2. The Mirror of Worlds (2007)
3. The Gods Return (2008)

=== Northworld ===
- Northworld (1990)
- Vengeance (1991)
- Justice (1992)
  - Northworld Trilogy (1999)—Omnibus edition (read online)

=== RCN series ===
The first three books in this series are available as ebooks via the Baen Free Library.

1	With the Lightnings	1998	ISBN 0-671-57886-3	Baen Free Library	(Author's note)
2	Lt. Leary, Commanding	2000	ISBN 0-671-57875-8	Baen Library
3	The Far Side of the Stars	2003	ISBN 0-7434-7158-X	Baen Library
4	The Way to Glory	2005	ISBN 0-7434-9882-8
5	Some Golden Harbor	2006	ISBN 978-1-4165-2080-1
6	When the Tide Rises	2008	ISBN 978-1-4165-5527-8
7	In the Stormy Red Sky	2009	ISBN 978-1-4165-9159-7
8	What Distant Deeps	2010	ISBN 978-1-4391-3366-8
9	The Road of Danger	2012	ISBN 978-1-4516-3815-8
10	The Sea Without a Shore	2014	ISBN 978-1-4767-3639-6
11	Death's Bright Day	2016	ISBN 978-1-4767-8147-1
12	Though Hell Should Bar the Way (RCN)	2018	ISBN 978-1481483131
13	To Clear Away the Shadows	2019	ISBN 978-1481484022

=== Reaches ===
1. Igniting the Reaches (1994)
2. Through the Breach (1995)
3. Fireships (1996)
- The Reaches (2004)—Omnibus edition

=== Time of Heroes ===
A reworking of the story of King Arthur in a world of realistic magic.

1. The Spark (2018)
2. The Storm (2019)
3. The Serpent (2021)

=== Thieves' World ===
- Dagger (1988)

=== The Tom Kelly novels ===
1. Skyripper (1983)
2. Fortress (1987)

- Loose Cannon (2011)—Omnibus edition

=== Venus series ===
- Surface Action (1990)
- The Jungle (1991)
  - Seas of Venus (2000)—Omnibus edition (read online)

== Novels (non-series) ==
- The Dragon Lord (1979)
- The Forlorn Hope (1984)
- Birds of Prey (1984)
- Killer (1985)—with Karl Edward Wagner (read online)
- Active Measures (1985)—with Janet Morris
- Ranks of Bronze (1986) (read online)
- Bridgehead (1986)
- Kill Ratio (1987)—with Janet Morris
- The Sea Hag (1988), originally marketed as the first novel of The World of Crystal Walls but there will (most likely) be no further entries in this "series"
- Target (1989)—with Janet Morris
- The Undesired Princess & The Enchanted Bunny (1990), anthology containing Drake's novella The Enchanted Bunny and the unrelated short novel The Undesired Princess by L. Sprague de Camp
- The Hunter Returns (1991)—based on Jim Kjelgaard's Fire-Hunter, for his estate
- Starliner (1992)
- Enemy of My Enemy (1995)—with Ben Ohlander
- Redliners (1996)
- Patriots (1996)

== Short fiction ==
=== Collections ===
- Time Safari (1982), collects three Henry Vickers stories
- From the Heart of Darkness (1983)
- Lacey and His Friends (1986), collects all three stories about Jed Lacey as well as the two unconnected time travel stories "Travellers" and "Time Safari"
- Vettius and His Friends (1989), collects all stories about Dama & Vettius as well as other historical fantasy stories
- Old Nathan (1991), collects all five stories about the eponymous Old Nathan; the entire collection is also included in the Baen anthology Mountain Magic (2004)
- The Military Dimension (1991)
- Tyrannosaur (1994), collects three Henry Vickers stories
- The Military Dimension Mark II (1995)
- All the Way to the Gallows (1996)
- Grimmer Than Hell (2003)
- Other Times Than Peace (2006)
- Night & Demons (2012)
- Dinosaurs & a Dirigible (2014), collection of five time travel stories, all four Henry Vickers stories and the unrelated story "Travellers"

=== Anthologies edited ===
- Armageddon (1986)—with Billie Sue Mosiman
- A Century of Horror 1970–1979: The Greatest Stories of the Decade (1987)—with Martin H. Greenberg
- Space Gladiators (1989)
- A Separate Star: A Science Fiction Tribute to Rudyard Kipling (1989)—with Sandra Miesel
- Heads to the Storm (1989)—with Sandra Miesel
- Space Infantry (1989)—with Martin H. Greenberg
- The Eternal City (1989)
- Space Dreadnoughts (1990)—with Martin H. Greenberg and Charles G. Waugh
- Dogs of War (2001)
- Foreign Legions (2001)—with Eric Flint and David Weber
- The World Turned Upside Down (2005)—with Eric Flint and Jim Baen

==== Starhunters ====
- Men Hunting Things (1988)
- Things Hunting Men (1988)
- Bluebloods (1990)

Three thematically linked anthologies containing SF hunting stories.

==== Fleet ====
With Bill Fawcett

1. The Fleet (1988)
2. Counterattack (1988)
3. Breakthrough (1989)
4. Sworn Allies (1990)
5. Total War (1990)
6. Crisis (1991)

==== Battlestation ====
With Bill Fawcett

- Battlestation (1992)
- The Vanguard (1993)
- Battlestations (2011)—omnibus compendium of Battlestation and The Vanguard

=== Short stories ===
- "Denkirch" in Travellers by Night (1967), Balefires (2007)
- "Lord of the Depths" in Dark Things (1971)
- "Arclight" in The Magazine of Fantasy and Science Fiction (April 1973)
- "Contact!" in Analog Science Fiction/Science Fact (October 1974), Body Armor: 2000 (1986)
- "Under the Hammer" in Galaxy Science Fiction (October 1974), Hammer's Slammers (1979)
- "The Butcher's Bill" in Galaxy Science Fiction (November 1974), Combat SF (1975), Hammer's Slammers (1979), Combat SF (1981), Hammer's Slammers (1987)
- "Something Had to Be Done" in The Magazine of Fantasy and Science Fiction (February 1975), The Year's Best Horror Stories: Series IV (1976), From the Heart of Darkness (1983), 100 Vicious Little Vampire Stories (1995)
- "Ranks of Bronze" in Galaxy Science Fiction (August 1975), There Will Be War (1983), Vettius and His Friends (1989)
- "But Loyal to His Own" in Galaxy Science Fiction (October 1975), Hammer's Slammers (1979)
- "Awakening" in Nameless Places (1975)
- "Children of the Forest" in The Magazine of Fantasy and Science Fiction (November 1976), The Year's Best Horror Stories: Series V (1977), From the Heart of Darkness (1983), Balefires (2007)
- "Blood Debt" in The 4th Mayflower Book of Black Magic Stories (1976), From the Heart of Darkness (1983)
- "Firefight" in Frights (1976), From the Heart of Darkness (1983)
- "The Hunting Ground" in Superhorror (1976), From the Heart of Darkness (1983)
- "Nation Without Walls" in Analog Science Fiction/Science Fact (July 1977)
- "The Last Battalion" in Analog Science Fiction/Science Fact (September 1977)
- "The Barrow Troll" in Savage Heroes (1977), Whispers (1977), The World Fantasy Awards Volume Two (1980), From the Heart of Darkness (1983), Vettius and His Friends (1989), Balefires (2007)
- "Smokie Joe" in More Devil's Kisses (1977), Terrors (1982), From the Heart of Darkness (1983), Balefires (2007)
- "Best of Luck" in The Year's Best Horror Stories: Series VI (1978), From the Heart of Darkness (1983)
- "Caught in the Crossfire" in Chrysalis 2 (1978), Hammer's Slammers (1979), Caught in the Crossfire (1998)
- "Cultural Conflict" in Destinies (January/February 1979), Hammer's Slammers (1979)
- "The Predators" in Destinies (October/December 1979)
- "Hangman" in Hammer's Slammers (1979), Supertanks (1987)
- "The Red Leer" in Whispers II (1979), From the Heart of Darkness (1983), Balefires (2007)
- "Standing Down" in Hammer's Slammers (1979)
- "Underground" in Destinies (February/March 1980)
- "Men Like Us" in Omni (May 1980), From the Heart of Darkness (1983)
- "The Automatic Rifleman" in Destinies (Fall 1980), From the Heart of Darkness (1983)
- "Goddess" in Tales from the Vulgar Unicorn (1980), Sanctuary (1982)
- "Than Curse the Darkness" in New Tales of the Cthulhu Mythos (1980), From the Heart of Darkness (1983), Balefires (2007)
- "Travellers" in Destinies (Winter 1981)
- "King Crocodile" in Whispers III (1981), Vettius and His Friends (1989)
- "The Dancer in the Flames" in From the Heart of Darkness (1983), Whispers IV (1983)
- "Votary" in The Face of Chaos (1983)
- "Out of Africa" in From the Heart of Darkness (1983), Horrorstory: Volume 4 (1990)
- "Code-name Feirefitz" in Men of War (1984)
- The Guardroom in Afterwar (1985)
- The Great Beer Shortage with Janet Morris in Far Frontiers Vol. VI (Fall 1986)
- "The Tank Lords" in Far Frontiers Vol. VI (Fall 1986), Hammer's Slammers (1987), Call to Battle (1988)
- "The Hand of Providence" in Heroes in Hell (1986)
- "'Cause I Served My Time in Hell" in Rebels in Hell (1986)
- "The Interrogation Team" in Warrior (1986), Caught in the Crossfire (1998)
- "The Fool" in Whispers VI (July 1987)
- "Bargain" in Masters in Hell (1987)
- "Learning Curve" in Angels in Hell (1987)
- "Liberty Port" in Alien Stars IV: Freelancers (1987)
- "Springs Eternal" in Crusaders in Hell (1987)
- "Wisdom" in Crusaders in Hell (1987)
- "Rescue Mission" in The Fleet (1988)
- "Safe to Sea" in Spacefighters (1988)
- "When the Devil Drives" in The Fleet: Counterattack (1988)
- "Dreams in Amber" in Vettius and His Friends (1989)
- "Killer" with Karl Edward Wagner in Vettius and His Friends (1989)
- "Exile" in Prophets in Hell (1989)
- "Elfin Pipes of Northworld" in The New York Review of Science Fiction (December 1990)
- "Looking Forward: Excerpt from Northworld: Justice" in Amazing Stories (March 1992)
- "Looking Forward: Excerpt from The Sharp End" in Amazing Stories (October 1993)
- "Cannibal Plants From Heck" in Alien Pregnant By Elvis (1994)
- "Airborne All the Way!" in Magic, the Gathering: Tapestries (1995)
- "To Bring the Light" in Locus (August 1996)
- "The Waiting Bullet" in Locus (August 1996)
- "A Grand Tour" in More than Honor (1998)
- "The Immovable Object" in Caught in the Crossfire (1998)
- "With the Sword He Must Be Slain" in Armageddon (1998)
- "A Very Offensive Weapon" in All the Way to the Gallows (1995)
- "The Tradesmen" in Grimmer Than Hell (2000)
- "A Death in Peacetime" in The Complete Hammer's Slammers Volume 1 (2005)
- "Dragon, the Book" in Catfantastic V (1999)

The Dama & Vettius stories

Sword & sorcery fantasy stories set at the time of the later Roman Empire. All of these stories have been collected in Vettius and His Friends (1989) which also contains a couple more unrelated stories.

- "The False Prophet", first published in (1989)
- "Black Iron", first published in Nameless Places (1975)
- "The Mantichore", first published in Swords Against Darkness III (1978)
- "The Shortest Way", first published in Whispers #3 (March 1974)
- "From the Dark Waters", first published in Waves of Terror: Weird Stories About the Sea (1976)
- "Nemesis Place", first published in Fantastic (April 1978)
- "Dragons' Teeth", first published in Midnight Sun (Summer-Fall 1975)

The Henry Vickers stories

These time travel stories about the dinosaur-hunting Henry Vickers have been published in various places. Time Safari (1982) collects the first three stories, Tyrannosaur (1993) also collects three stories but replaces "Calibration Run" with "King Tyrant Lizard". All four stories were first published together in Dinosaurs & a Dirigible (2014) which also contains the unrelated time travel story "Travellers".

- "Time Safari", first published in Destinies (Spring 1981)
- "Calibration Run", first published in Time Safari (1982)
- "Boundary Layer", first published in Time Safari (1982)
- "King Tyrant Lizard", first published in Tyrannosaur (1993)

Honorverse

- "A Grand Tour" (1998, short story in the anthology More Than Honor)

== Critical studies and reviews of Drake's work ==
Into the Maelstrom

- Sakers, Don (November 2015). "The Reference Library". Analog Science Fiction and Fact. Vol. 135, no. 11. pp. 105–108.
