= King Thrushbeard =

German fairy tale

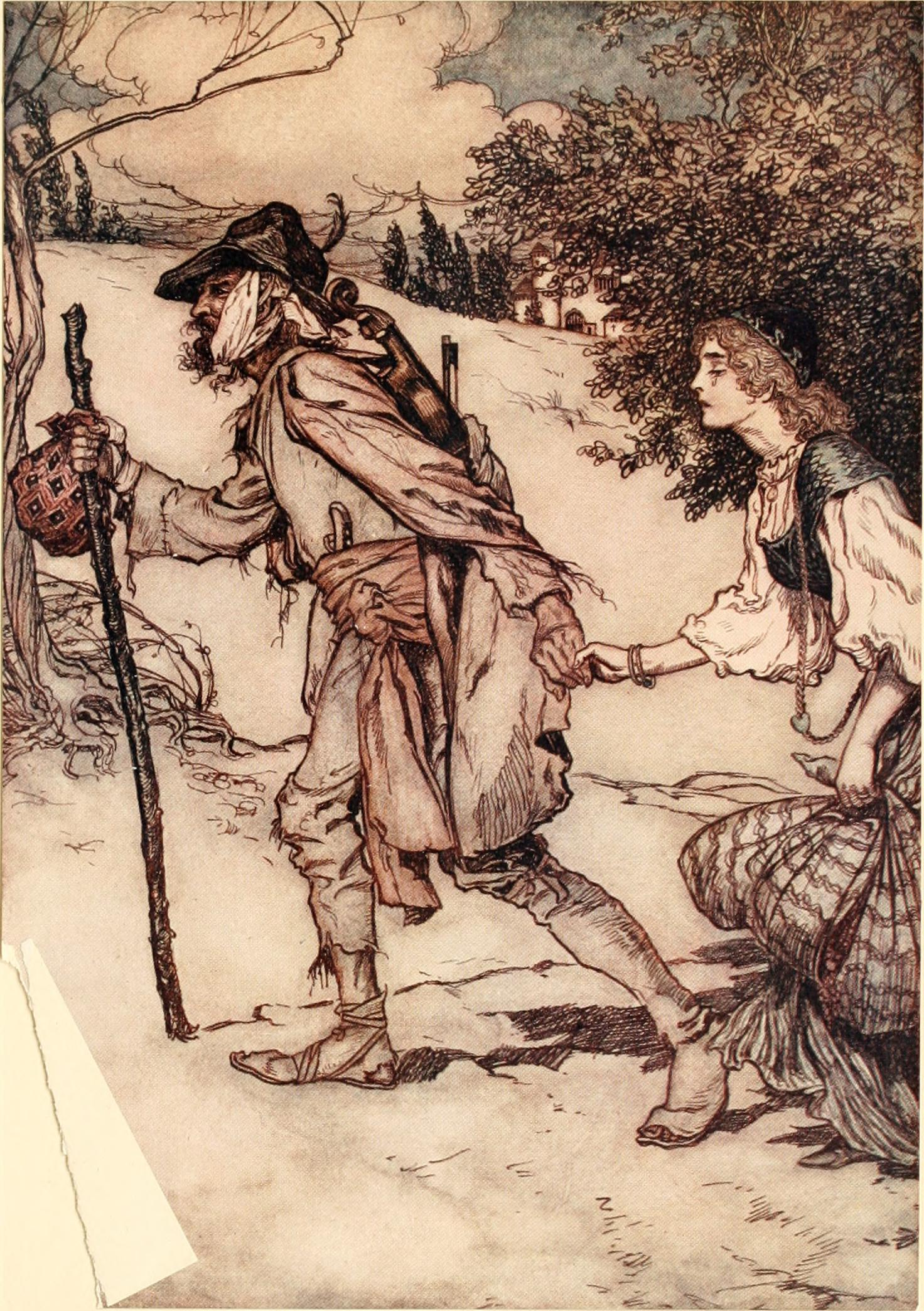
- 1916 illustration by Arthur Rackham

Folk tale
- Name: King Thrushbeard
- Aarne–Thompson grouping: ATU 900
- Country: Germany
- Published in: Grimm's Fairy Tales

"King Thrushbeard" (German: König Drosselbart) or the haughty princess (German: die hochmütige Prinzessin) is a German fairy tale collected by the Brothers Grimm (KHM 52). It is of Aarne–Thompson type 900.

== Origin ==
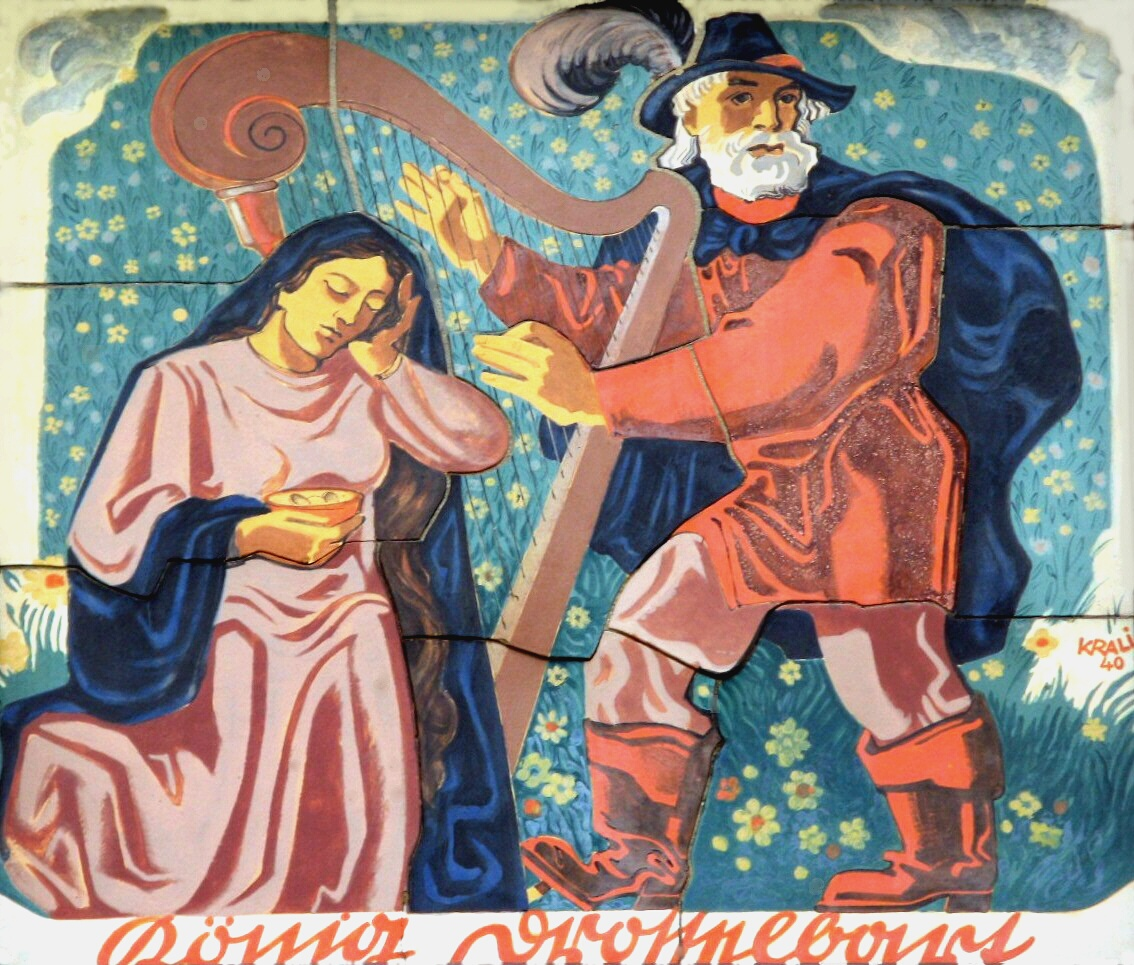
King Thrushbeard by Johann-Mithlinger-Siedlung

The tale was published by the Brothers Grimm in the first edition of Kinder- und Hausmärchen in 1812, and slightly modified in the second edition issued in 1819. Their sources were the Hassenpflug family from Hanau, supplemented by Ludowine Haxthausen and by Wilhelm Grimm's friend and future wife, Dorothea Wild.

== Synopsis ==
An old king has a beautiful daughter who has many suitors. However, the princess is so spoiled and haughty that she ridicules all the men who come asking for her hand in marriage.

One night, the king sponsors a feast to which he has invited a number of rich and powerful men for his daughter to choose a husband from. Again, the princess openly mocks her suitors, the last of whom is a young king with such a pointed chin that—to her—looks like a thrush's beak, so she cruelly dubs him "King Thrushbeard". Exasperated and angry at how his daughter has scorned all her rich suitors, the king vows that she shall marry the first beggar who comes to the palace.

A few days after the feast, a young minstrel arrives at the palace and plays music for the king. Pleased with the minstrel's performance, the king has a priest officiate the young man and the princess's wedding that same day. The princess opposes vehemently, but her father has given his word. After the wedding, the king banishes his daughter because she has become a beggar's wife and the minstrel takes her away.

As they travel to the minstrel's home, the newlyweds pass by the fine lands and properties that belong to King Thrushbeard, and the princess begins to regret scorning him. The princess and her husband soon arrive at his home, a small house fit only for two. The minstrel treats his wife as though she were a commoner and she is upset that she must work for a living. The princess is tasked with practical chores such as cleaning the house, weaving baskets, and spinning cotton, at which she is completely inept. She is then sent to sell pots in the marketplace and all seems to go well, until a drunken soldier on horseback smashes all the pots to pieces.

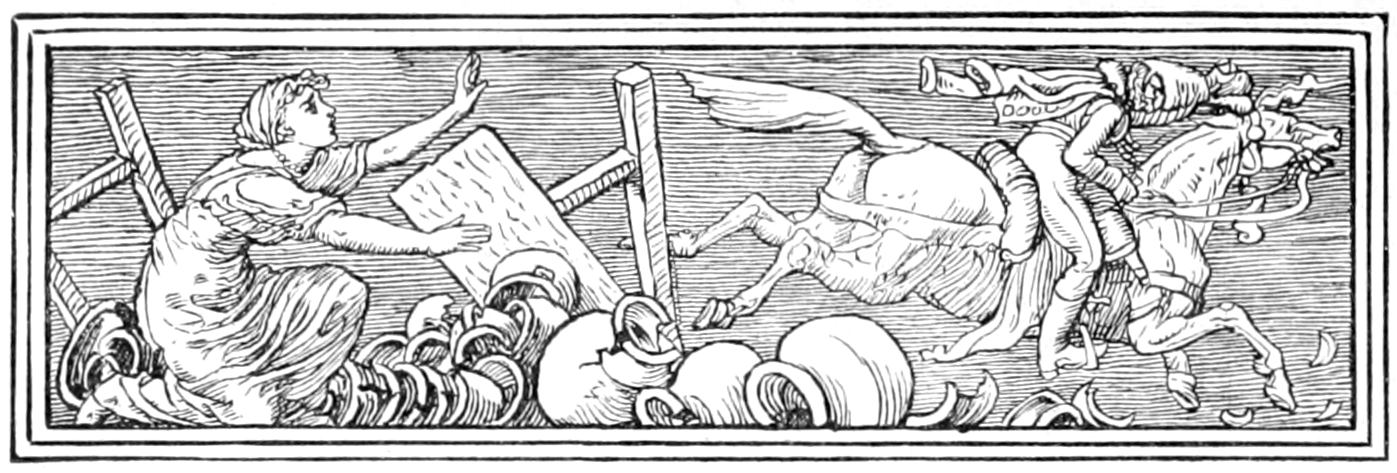
The disguised King Thrushbeard smashing the pottery. Illustration by Walter Crane, 1882

Thoroughly annoyed at his wife's constant failures, the minstrel tells her the only job left for her is to work as a servant at the nearby castle of King Thrushbeard himself.

The princess gets hired as a kitchen maid, taking home the leftovers in jars she hides in her apron pockets and sharing the food with her husband.

One day, the princess hears that King Thrushbeard is getting married. As she watches the guests having a good time in the ballroom, the princess regrets her haughtiness. Out of the blue, King Thrushbeard forces the princess to dance with him, sending her jars of leftovers spilling all over the floor and making the guests laugh at her. The princess is so upset that she runs off.

However, to the princess's surprise, King Thrushbeard follows her and reveals that he and her husband, the minstrel, are the same person. He had fallen in love with her despite her haughtiness and secretly married her through her father's vow. Her ordeals (including his disguise as a drunken soldier) were meant to both humble her and punish her for her cruelty towards him. The princess swears that she has indeed been humbled. The princess and King Thrushbeard have another wedding with her father in attendance.

== Cultural legacy ==
- The story was filmed as König Drosselbart (1954), directed by Herbert B. Fredersdorf.
- The story was adapted in 1969 as the Soviet cartoon The Capricious Princess (Капризная принцесса).
- The tale is retold in an episode of Grimm's Fairy Tale Classics under the title King Grizzlebeard. In this version, the princess' name is Elena. In addition, her father decrees that Elena will be married to the man with the lowest standing who comes to the castle the next day.
- A version is told in the book Servant of the Dragon by David Drake.
- A version of the story also appears in the cartoon series Simsala Grimm. In this version, the princess' name is Constance, while King Thrushbeard's name is Conrad. In addition, Constance's father decrees that she will be married to the next minstrel who comes to the castle.
- In the comic book series Fables by Bill Willingham, Thrushbeard is a fable that resides at Fabletown and first appears in Fables Vol 4.
- Hilaire Belloc stated that Grizzlebeard was one of the 4 main characters in his 1911 book The Four Men — a Farrago.
