= The Forlorn Hope =

1984 novel by David Drake

- First edition
- Author: David Drake
- Cover artist: Alan Gutierrez
- Language: English
- Genre: Science fiction novel
- Publisher: Tor Books
- Publication date: 1984
- Publication place: United States
- Media type: Print (Paperback)
- Pages: 318
- ISBN: 0-81253-610X
- OCLC: 10749351

The Forlorn Hope is a science fiction novel by David Drake.

== Background ==
The Forlorn Hope was originally intended as the first volume of a series for Ace Books, later installments of which would be written by other authors; the setting of the book was based on the Thirty Years' War while the initial situation was inspired by Xenophon's Anabasis. However, after Ace was acquired by G. P. Putnam's Sons, Jim Baen of Tor Books made a successful offer for the book. Drake did not write any sequels to this book as he felt that he had ended it at a satisfactory point.

The technology and setting of The Forlorn Hope are comparable to that of Drake's Hammerverse; however, Drake has confirmed that this book is not set in the same fictional universe as the Hammer's Slammers stories.

== Plot introduction ==
The Forlorn Hope follows the fortunes of a mercenary company named "Fasolini's Company". On the planet Cecach, a civil war has raged between the secular Federals and their religious zealot adversaries, the Republicans. Fasolini's Company is to provide heavy support to a Federal firebase. When the firebase is cut off and surrounded by Republican troops, the Federals surrender, offering Fasolini's Company to the Republicans as part of the bargain. Since the Republicans have vowed to execute any mercenaries who fall into their hands, Fasolini's Company decides that it must flee the firebase before the Republicans arrive to take control. Fighting both the turncoat Federals and the Republicans, Fasolini's Company, with the aid of a loyal Federal logistics officer and the captain of a planet-trapped interstellar freighter, must march across enemy lines to reach the safety of the intact and still loyal Federal lines.

== Release details ==
- 1984, Tor. 0-81253-610X
- 1988, Tor. 0-81253-6223
- 1991, Tor. 0-81251-3320
- 2006, Tor. 0-765356-465
