= The Dragon Lord (Drake novel) =

1979 historical fantasy novel by David Drake

- First edition
- Author: David Drake
- Cover artist: Gianni Benvenuti
- Language: English
- Genre: Historical fantasy, sword and sorcery
- Publisher: Berkley Books, Tor Books (2nd ed.)
- Publication date: 1979 (revised 1982)
- Publication place: United States
- Media type: Print (hardback & paperback)
- ISBN: 0-399-12380-6

The Dragon Lord is a historical fantasy or sword and sorcery novel by American writer David Drake. First published in 1979 and revised in 1982, the novel is set in sixth-century Arthurian Britain.

== Background ==
The Dragon Lord was David Drake's first novel. He spent six months researching and drafting the plot for another author, Andrew J. Offutt, to expand into a novel. He drafted the novel for the Robert E. Howard character Cormac mac Art, who lived in Arthur's time. When Offutt declined it Drake developed it himself. He wrote it in 1977–78 and after substantial edits at the request of the editor at Berkley Books, it was published as a hardcover in 1979. The publisher sold its rights to Jim Baen who requested the original version of the book, before the edits of Berkley Books. Baen at Tor Books published the pre-edit version as a paperback in 1982. According to Drake, the hardcover and paperback versions of the novel are "significantly different".

== Plot summary ==
In sixth-century Britain, King Arthur desires a dragon to harass the Saxon invaders. Merlin tells Arthur that the skull of a lake monster is required. From a batch of new mercenary recruits to Arthur's army, Gawain selects an Irishman called Mael and a Dane called Starkad after Mael defeats Lancelot in a demonstration duel in front of the recruits. Arthur sends Mael to Ireland to retrieve the skull and keeps Mael's friend Starkad as hostage to ensure his return. In Ireland, Mael is escorted to a road where he meets Veleda, a pagan witch who foresaw Mael's coming. The two travel together for three days and arrive at Lough Ree where a pagan shrine has been converted to a chapel manned by a priest and a large, intellectually disabled student, Fergus. During the night Mael steals the monster skull which was on display in the chapel but Fergus catches him. The ensuing fight spills out onto the lake pier that breaks apart as Fergus fights with a mace. Veleda helps Mael back to land but Fergus drowns and a lake monster drags the priest away. On their way back to Britain, Mael and Veleda are attacked on a ship but escape as Veleda summons a purple fire that burns their attackers.

With the skull Merlin creates a small dragon (a wyvern) which he hopes to grow and teach to be obedient. Mael is re-united with Starkad and they consider whether to stay in Arthur's camp. Veleda has a vision and implores they to retrieve the spear and shield of the Saxon Biargram Ironhand. Mael and Starkad leave on the pretext that Starkad must go settle a blood feud with Biargram. Arthur detains Veleda as insurance of their return. Traveling to the Saxon territories, they walk to a drought-stricken village where desperate villagers are attempting to sacrifice a girl. Mael and Starkad interrupt and kidnap the girl. They flee to a house where an old woman, a witch, was expecting them. The sacrificial girl cuts Starkad's legs in the night and escapes. Mael continues on without Starkad and reaches Biargram's homestead, where he learns Biargram has recently died. Biargram's son throws Mael into Biargram's crypt as a sacrifice. A curse was placed on Biargram that makes him return to life every night. Mael fights off the re-animated corpse and is saved by Starkad who interrupts grave-robbers. They carry off Biargram's spear and shield.

Once back at Arthur's camp Mael and Starkad are reunited with Veleda. Arthur claims Biargram's spear for himself. Mael and Starkad take their places in Arthur's army and are marched northwards to the walled town of Leicester. They spend the night there, meet with a wounded Dane veteran and defeat two Herulians after they killed a family while pillaging. The next day at the battle front they are positioned against Aelle’s forces. The Saxon forces ford the Dubglas River and attack the Britons who slow the Saxon advance using horse archers and caltrops. In the midst of battle Aelle nearly kills a dismounted Arthur but is foiled and killed by Mael. Victorious, Arthur immediately sends Mael and Starkad away to tell Merlin to release his dragon. Merlin trapped the dragon in a cave but had lost control of it. Veleda insists that dragon must be killed because it is too powerful and uncontrollable. In battle with the dragon Mael uses Biargram's shield against its fire breath, and they are able to kill it. The three flee Britain to escape Arthur's retribution for killing his dragon.

== Characters ==
- Mael mac Ronan: an Irish mercenary, friend to Starkad. As the story progresses he is revealed to be self-exiled from Ireland after killing a prince over a woman, which still haunts him; his true name is Loeghaire. He falls in love with Veleda. He is based on Howard's Cormac mac Art.
- Starkad: a Danish mercenary, friend to Mael. He is a huge man, taller than Mael's 6 feet and broader. He wields an ax and is called Grettir, "the Cruncher". Much like a stereotypical Viking with his huge frame and appetite for alcohol, women and violence, he is based on Howard's Wulfhere the Skull-Splitter.
- Veleda: a mysterious pagan woman with precognitive abilities and magic powers. Starkad realizes she is a possibly immortal priestess.
- Arthur: a megalomaniac British king of the Votadini, at war with the Saxons. He is obsessed with uniting Britain under his rule and winning everlasting renown. Born with a club foot, he goes on horseback to make up for his disability and is deathly afraid of being unhorsed. He employs heavy cavalry patterned after Eastern cataphracts, who serve as both horse archers and lancers. Many of his troops are mercenaries from various tribes, including Franks, Goths, Vandals, Herulians, and Huns. His followers call him "the Leader".

Several other characters from Arthurian legend and the Matter of Britain are also featured in the novel. Lancelot is depicted as a Roman with a grudge on barbarians who serves as Arthur's chief adviser and Master of Soldiers. Gawain, Cei and Geraint are also officers in Arthur's army. Merlin is Arthur's wizard who, unlike in other works, Arthur treats without reverence; at the end of the novel, while Arthur rants about "being remembered" he conjures a vision of the Grail. Cerdic is depicted as a British king allied with the Saxons. The conflict between Vortigern, Hengst and Horsa is mentioned as backstory, with "Vortigern" explained as the British term for high king; the king's real name was Vitalis. Arthur's father Uther is also mentioned; both he and Arthur are called Pendragon after their hereditary draco war standard.

== Reception ==
A review in Publishers Weekly called the novel "a grim, gritty and different fantasy adventure." A reviewer at swordandsorcery.org, Ryan Harvey, compared it to Robert E. Howard pastiche, and wrote "some prolonged sequences...turn out as nothing more than cul-de-sacs, neither adding nor detracting to the narrative." However, he found the prose to flow easily and the background to be very well-researched.

== See also ==
- Time of Heroes, another reworking of the Arthurian legend by David Drake
