= RCN Series =

Science fiction book series by David Drake

The RCN Series (also known as the Lt. Leary series or Leary and Mundy series) is a sequence of stand-alone science fiction novels by David Drake. They center around Daniel Leary, an officer in the Republic of Cinnabar Navy (RCN), and Adele Mundy, a librarian and spy. Drake, as well as a number of reviewers, have described it as "an SF version of the Aubrey/Maturin series" by Patrick O'Brian. In contrast to the hardcore military science fiction bent of Drake's Hammer's Slammers series, these novels are more character-driven and feature political intrigue as well as battles.

The plots of the novels are based on historical incidents, often from Ancient Greece or Ancient Rome. The prologue of each book includes details of its historical basis.

The series began with With the Lightnings in 1998. The final—thirteenth—entry in the series is To Clear Away the Shadows, published in 2019.

== Creation ==
After discovering the Aubrey/Maturin novels, Drake gave some thought to space opera with two equal but very different characters as protagonists. When David Weber asked Drake for a novella to appear in the first Honorverse anthology, More Than Honor, Drake wrote a story named A Grand Tour about a young nobleman and his older, female tutor. Drake, Jim Baen and Weber all liked the story, but Drake, feeling the concept needed a full-length novel to work properly, wrote With the Lightnings, which uses different characters in a similar pairing.

== General plot ==
The RCN Series focuses on the intertwined lives of two primary characters. Daniel Leary is a Lieutenant (promoted to Captain in the later novels) in the Republic of Cinnabar Navy, a brilliant strategist, charismatic leader, charmer of women, and also the estranged son of Speaker Corder Leary, a feared, revered and respected member of the government of the planet Cinnabar. Adele Mundy is a librarian with a deep-rooted passion for information and knowledge, which has fueled her unparalleled talents in the areas of information retrieval by any means necessary, including systems infiltration and circumventing information security. Raised in the Cinnabaran aristocracy, Mundy is also an expert pistol shot, a skill useful for surviving and avoiding aristocratic duels.

During an attempt by the totalitarian Alliance of Free Stars to stage a takeover-by-proxy of a Cinnabar ally, Mundy and Leary are pressed together by circumstance in order to serve the interests of their homeworld. Complicating matters is the fact that Mundy is living in exile from Cinnabar, after her family was executed for their part in a nearly successful treason plot against Cinnabar—a string of executions ordered by Daniel's father, Speaker Leary. Nonetheless, Daniel and Adele reach an understanding and eventually a friendship, and along with an extensive cast of characters continue their travels together in service of the RCN, defending against threats from the Alliance and others.

== Technology ==
Interstellar travel is accomplished through the use of advanced sails on the hull of starships, which take advantage of a fictional radiation to move the crafts outside of the real universe, allowing faster-than-light travel. Sublight-speed travel is driven by a matter-antimatter annihilating "High Drive". Use of the High Drive in an atmosphere results in catastrophic reactions with unspent antimatter from the drive, so for intra-atmospheric operations, ships use plasma motors that vent reaction mass (water) from the fusion engines into rocket nozzles.

Hand and vehicle weapons are generally based on electromagnetic acceleration of projectiles, while space weaponry consists of kinetic energy missiles accelerated to a high fraction of c (thereby rendering any warhead superfluous) and point defense plasma systems. In addition to point defense, the ship-mounted plasma systems are used for close range or atmospheric ship-to-ship combat. In atmosphere, the kinetic missiles are unusable, due to their utilization of the matter-antimatter High Drive.

== Bibliography ==
The series consists of thirteen novels. The first book is available as an ebook via the Baen Free Library.

Publication order	Chronology order	Title	Year	ISBN	Summary	Notes
1	1	With the Lightnings	1998	ISBN 0-671-57886-3	While on Kostroma as a very junior lieutenant in Cinnabar's navy, Leary escapes a coup that was engineered by Alliance spies, and meets Adele Mundy.	
2	2	Lt. Leary, Commanding	2000	ISBN 0-671-57875-8	Leary is given command of the ship he captured at Kostroma. Falsified orders cause him to take on board a young man being held hostage by Cinnabar's government.	
3	3	The Far Side of the Stars	2003	ISBN 0-7434-7158-X	Peace has broken out. Leary and Mundy allow the ship to be leased by backwater nobles who are searching for a historical treasure.	
4	4	The Way to Glory	2005	ISBN 0-7434-9882-8	Leary's estranged father tries to get his son to take vengeance on a commander who executed an officer believed to be Leary's illegitimate half-brother.	
5	5	Some Golden Harbor	2006	ISBN 978-1-4165-2080-1	Leary's patron in the service retires, and the new chief of the Navy sends him to a backwater to stop an Alliance invasion of a barbaric planet.	
6	6	When the Tide Rises	2008	ISBN 978-1-4165-5527-8	Leary is sent to a backwater system to stabilize its government. Having done so, he stops the Alliance from overwhelming a Cinnabar task force holding an important waypoint planet.	
7	7	In the Stormy Red Sky	2009	ISBN 978-1-4165-9159-7	Leary transports a Cinnabar Senator as an ambassador to an allied star nation only to find the new leader is favoring the Alliance ambassador's offer of alliance instead.	
8	8	What Distant Deeps	2010	ISBN 978-1-4391-3366-8	Brilliant and brave starship captain Daniel Leary and ace 'information gatherer' Adele Mundy confront a pirate plot and once again save the Republic of Cinnabar despite itself.	
9	9	The Road of Danger	2012	ISBN 978-1-4516-3815-8	Captain Daniel Leary with his friend—and spy—Officer Adele Mundy are sent to a quiet sector to carry out an easy task: helping the local admiral put down a coup before it takes place. But then the jealous admiral gets rid of them by sending them off on a wild goose chase to a sector where commerce is king and business is carried out by extortion and gunfights.	
10	10	The Sea Without a Shore	2014	ISBN 978-1-4767-3639-6	Leary transports a treasure hunter to a planet at war, while Adele must deal with the leader there who is blackmailing the Leary Family.	
11	11	Death's Bright Day	2016	ISBN 978-1-4767-8147-1	"Captain Daniel Leary thinks that his marriage will allow him to slip into the quiet role of a naval officer in peacetime. His friend, the spy and cybrarian Adele Mundy, is content to be collating data in her library. But high officials of both superpowers are involved! Those who want Daniel and Adele to become involved in the Tarbell Stars claim that only they can prevent a war between the Republic of Cinnabar and its great rival, the Alliance of Free Stars. The conflict is political, but at the sharp end it means blazing warfare and cold-blooded murder. Daniel and Adele will be at the sharp end."	
12	12	Though Hell Should Bar The Way	2018	ISBN 978-1-4814-8313-1	Roy Olfetrie planned to be an officer in the Republic of Cinnabar Navy (RCN) but when his father was unmasked as a white-collar criminal he had to take whatever he was offered. What is offered turns out to be a chance to accompany Captain Daniel Leary and Lady Adele Mundy as they go off to start a war that will put Roy at the sharp end.	Leary and Mundy are only peripherally involved in this novel.
13	13	To Clear Away the Shadows	2019	ISBN 978-1-4814-8402-2	The truce between Cinnabar and the Alliance is holding, and the RCN is able to explore regions of the galaxy without the explorers being swept up in great power conflict. The exploration ship The Far Traveller and its crew is sent to map new areas and it turns out have new adventures. (Although set in the RCN universe, Daniel Leary and Adele Mundy are not characters in the book.)	This is the only RCN novel without Leary and Mundy.

== Reception ==
The series received generally positive reviews; for example Booklist contributor Roland Green noted that the author's "sense of humor infuses the characters here with agreeable qualities" while reviews in Publishers Weekly mentioned "the wonderfully strong quality" of one of the volumes, and called the series a "rousing old-fashioned space opera". Likewise, a reviewer for Tor.com noted that the series "is an excellent example of space operatic military SF". Authors of the Genreflecting book called the series "clever novels of political intrigue and battle action".
