= Dragon's teeth =

Dragon's teeth or dragon's tooth may refer to:

- Dragon's teeth (mythology), in Greek mythology; once planted, each tooth grew into an armed warrior.

== Books ==
- Dragon's Teeth: A Novel, an 1878 realist novel by José Maria de Eça de Queiroz
- "The Dragon's Teeth; or, Army-Seed," a chapter in the 1901 children's book The Wouldbegoods by E. Nesbit.
- The Dragon's Teeth, a 1939 mystery novel by Ellery Queen
- Dragon's Teeth (novel), a 1942 Pulitzer Prize-winning historical novel by Upton Sinclair
- Dragon's teeth: the background, contents and consequences of the North Atlantic Pact, 1949 non-fiction book by Konni Zilliacus
- "Dragons' Teeth" (short story), a 1977 fantasy short story by David Drake
- The Dragon's Teeth?, a 1982 American book by Benjamin S. Kelsey
- The Dragon's Tooth, a 2011 fantasy novel by N.D. Wilson
- Dragon's Teeth Mountains, a fictional mountain range in the Shannara series of books
- Dragon Teeth, a posthumous novel by late Michael Crichton (published in May 2017)
- Pull the Dragon's Tooth!, a 2016 fantasy story by Geronimo Stilton.

== Other media ==
- "The Dragon's Teeth" (radio), a 1941 radio story
- "Dragon's Teeth" (Star Trek: Voyager), a 1999 television episode
- Dragon's Tooth (video game), a 1986 British video game
- Dragon's Teeth, the fourth expansion pack for the video game Battlefield 4

== Places ==
- Dragons Teeth (Antarctica), a small group of rocks in Antarctica
- Dragon's Teeth Gate, a craggy granite outcrop in Singapore
- Dragon's Tooth (Virginia), a trail landmark in Virginia

== Other uses ==
- Dragon's teeth (fortification), anti-tank obstacles
- Dragon's teeth (plant), a plant species in the genus Lotus
- Dragon's Teeth (traffic), a series of calibrated lines painted on a road surface to enforce a speed limit
- Dragon Teeth, a variety of Long gu, an ingredient used in Traditional Chinese Medicine

== See also ==
- Dragontooth (disambiguation)
