= Hammer's Slammers series =

Fictional setting for writing by David Drake

Hammer's Slammers series (or the Hammerverse, Slammerverse, Slammers universe, Hammer universe) is a setting for a series of military science fiction short stories and novels by author David Drake. The series follows the career of a future mercenary tank regiment called Hammer's Slammers, after their leader, Colonel Alois Hammer. The series began with the short story collection Hammer's Slammers (1979), with the latest installment a short story published in 2015. A tabletop wargame and a roleplaying game set in Hammerverse universe have also been published.

== Series ==
The series began with short stories which were published at Galaxy magazine (edited by Jim Baen), beginning with ‘Under the Hammer’ (October 1974). They were re-released in the form of anthologies, with Drake later writing novels and further stories set in the universe. While the works feature recurring characters and setting elements, they do not form a complete or consistent narrative.

=== Individual stories ===
- "Under the Hammer" (1974)
- "The Butcher's Bill" (1974)
- "But Loyal to His Own" (1975)
- "Caught in the Crossfire" (1978)
- "Cultural Conflict" (1979)
- "The Bonding Authority" (1979)
- "Table of Organization and Equipment, Hammer's Regiment" (1979)
- "Backdrop to Chaos" (1979)
- "Powerguns" (1979)
- "The Church of the Lord's Universe" (1979)
- "Supertanks" (1979)
- "Standing Down" (1979)
- "Hangman" (1979)
- "Code-Name Feirefitz" (1984)
- Cross the Stars (1984)
- "The Interrogation Team" (1985)
- At Any Price (1985)
- "The Tank Lords" (1986)
- "Liberty Port" (1987)
- The Voyage (1994)
- "Night March" (1997)
- "The Immovable Object" (1998)
- "The Irresistible Force" (1998)
- "Choosing Sides" (2002)
- "The Political Process" (2002)
- "Neck or Nothing" (2002)
- "A Death in Peacetime" (2005)
- "The Day of Glory" (2006)
- "The Darkness" (2006)
- "Save What You Can" (2015)
- "The Losing Side" (2015, by Larry Correia)

=== Collections ===
- Hammer's Slammers (1979)
- At Any Price (1985)
- Counting the Cost (1987)
- Rolling Hot (1989)
- The Warrior (1991)
- The Sharp End (1993)
- The Tank Lords (1997; 2nd ed. 20212)
- The Butcher's Bill (1998)
- Caught in the Crossfire (1998)
- Paying the Piper (2002)
- The Complete Hammer's Slammers Volume 1 (2006)
- The Complete Hammer's Slammers Volume 2 (2007)
- The Complete Hammer's Slammers Volume 3 (2007)
- At Any Price / Rolling Hot (2011)
- Counting the Cost / The Warrior (2011)
- Voyage Across the Stars (2012)

=== Related works ===
A Hammer's Slammers board wargame was produced under license by Mayfair Games. Two sets of miniatures rules have been produced by Pireme Publishing

1. Hammer's Slammers Handbook
2. Hammer's Anvils: Handbook 2 The Opponents

A role playing supplement using the Traveller rules by Mongoose Publishing became available in June 2009.

== Analysis ==
As with his other work, Drake borrows plots from historical or mythological sources for many of the Hammer's Slammers stories. For example, he retells the story of Jason and the Argonauts in The Voyage, and part of the Odyssey in Cross the Stars. Other stories borrow from pulp era fiction (The Sharp End is based on Dashiell Hammett's Red Harvest.)

The series has been described as "not easily associated with any prevailing ideological tendency".

The series was inspired by Drake's experiences stemming from his military service in the Vietnam War.

== Reception ==
The series has been described as Drake's best known work and "immensely popular".

Reviews:

- Stanley, Steven (2006-07-23). "First of a military science-fiction series". The Roanoke Times.
- Lardas, Mike (2010-12-05). "'Hammer's Slammers' 3 fun for military sci-fi fans". The Daily News.
- "The Complete Hammer's Slammers: Volume One". Publishers Weekly. Vol. 253, no. 1. 2006-01-02. p. 40. EBSCOhost 20235468. Archived from the original on 2023-05-09.

== See also ==
- Falkenberg's Legion
