= Chalcus =

Chalcus, a Latin word derived from the Greek word χαλκός meaning copper or bronze (plural chalci), may refer to:

- Dionysius Chalcus, an ancient Athenian poet and orator
- a Greek copper money (see Ancient Roman units of measurement)
- Captain Chalcus, a character in the 1999 fantasy novel Servant of the Dragon

== See also ==
- Chalcis, a modern Greek town whose name derives from the word Chalcus
