= With the Lightnings =

1998 novel by David Drake

- Author: David Drake
- Cover artist: David Mattingly
- Language: English
- Series: RCN Series
- Genre: Military space opera
- Publisher: Baen Books
- Publication date: 1998
- Publication place: United States
- Media type: Print (Paperback)
- Pages: 323 pp (Paperback edition)
- ISBN: 0-671-87881-6
- OCLC: 38856076
- Preceded by: None (first in the series)
- Followed by: Lt. Leary Commanding

With the Lightnings is a 1998 science fiction novel by David Drake. It is the first part of the military space opera RCN Series.

== Development ==
The style and character dynamics trace their lineage back to A Grand Tour by David Drake from More Than Honor, a story in the Honorverse setting. Although the setting universe is entirely separate, careful reading may reveal similarities to the first novel in this series. Both were published in 1998. Indeed, Drake confirms that A Grand Tour is the conceptual antecedent of With the Lightnings.

== Plot ==
During a war between a Republic of Cinnabar and the Alliance of Free Stars, a coup d'état takes place on a neutral planet of Kostroma, with both factions becoming involved. Two Cinnabarian protagonists – a navy lieutenant and émigré librarian – find themselves in the center of the unfolding events.

== Reception ==
The book has received several reviews.

- Review by Don D'Ammassa (1998) in Science Fiction Chronicle, #197 May–June 1998
- Review by Peter D. Tillman (1998) in SF Site
- Review by Donna McMahon (2002) in SF Site
- Review by David Mandeville (1998) in CNN
- Review by Thomas M. Wagner (1998) at SFReviews
