= The Gods Return =

2008 novel by David Drake

- First edition
- Author: David Drake
- Cover artist: Donato Giancola
- Language: English
- Series: Crown of the Isles #3
- Genre: Epic fantasy
- Publisher: Tor Books
- Publication date: November 11, 2008
- Publication place: United States
- Media type: Print (hardcover & paperback)
- Pages: 398 pp.
- ISBN: 978-0-765-31261-7
- Preceded by: The Mirror of Worlds

The Gods Return is the ninth and final book in the Lord of the Isles Saga by David Drake. It was published in 2008 by Tor Books, the third book of the Crown of the Isles. It follows the stories of Garric, Sharina, Cashel and Ilna in the newly changed world that was once the Isles and is now a great continent: the Land.

== Plot introduction ==
Drake introduces the novel:

The Isles have been more or less unified under Garric's rule, but the Change that created the continent has removed the old Gods of the Isles from reality and released other Gods from other planes of existence.

Now the servants of the forbidden Gods of Palomir call forth the Worm, an ancient thing that threatens to devour all life in the newly formed kingdom and make way for the reign of dark Gods, newly awakened to ambitions of worship and domination. Some are bad... and some are worse.

== Synopsis ==
=== Prologue ===
In Palomir, the priest of Franca, Salmson, calls forth the Worm; a giant worm that spews a black ash cloud from its mouth that melts the flesh off of whomever it touches, through the use of blood sacrifices. Using a hair of the Lady he restrains it and gives it into the keeping of Archas, a pirate. Salmson tells him that he must always possess the talisman, or the Worm will devour all the world as it did to its own. Upon summoning the worm, they see through to the worms home world, it is barren, lifeless, and completely covered in a grey ash.

=== The Main Events ===
Following the events of The Mirror of Worlds Garric, Sharina, Cashel and Ilna have been reunited on Pandah, the new capital of the continent. When they begin receiving reports of rat armies moving forth from Palomir under the influence of its Emperor and the forbidden gods (Franca in particular), they are forced to separate to save the kingdom.

Garric and Tenoctris take the army to Haft where they have reports that an army of Rat men are advancing. Garric leaves control of the city in the hands of Sharina as his regent. Upon arriving in Haft Garric is met by his father Reise, who urges him to return to Barca's Hamlet and visit his mother. The Army moves to Barca's Hamlet and Garric visits his mother, assuring her that despite the lack of blood relationship she is still the only mother he has ever known. We next find Garric on the march, his troops run into a foraging party of the rat men, Garric rides out to meet them with a squadron of cavalry and a regiment of infantry. In the course of the brief battle Garric discovers that the scent of the Rat men causes horses to either run in fear, or attack in a fit of rage. Garric is almost killed in the course of the battle but is saved by a platoon of infantrymen. Garric orders the recovery of some of the bodies and brings one to Tenoctris, who upon examining the corpse discovers how they are made. She informs Garric that the rats are created by stealing the souls of the dead, and putting them in the bodies of rats. She also informs him that they must venture into a different plane of existence to find Lord Munn and ask him to close the Ivory Gate, through which the souls of the dead are being stolen. Guided by a boatman, they come to a temple and awaken Lord Munn, who then closes the Ivory Gate, halting the creation of further rat legions. Returning to their own world, Garric and Tenoctris battle the legions of the Emperor and defeat them.

Cashel travels with Liane and Rasile to Dariada. There they hope to stop the Worm, which now approaches the city to destroy it. They take counsel from the Tree Oracle and journey to awaken the hero Gorand, who had defeated the Worm once before and then was driven from Dariada by its people. Coming to a different world, they defeat the Lord and then pass through a gate where they defeat a pair of wizards and awake Gorand. While he is reluctant to return, he follows them out. In Dariada, he possesses the Tree Oracle, and destroys the worm. In the midst of the fighting, Cashel becomes the Shepherd, the last of the Gods to return.

Ilna goes south at the request of former Admiral Zettin where she searches for one of his relatives. There she is taken by a wizard who convinces her to steal a box that belonged to the wizards deceased husband. They go down to his grave and there Ilna opens the box, meeting Usun. She travels on and comes to a new land where she meets King Perus, Princess Perrine and Prince Perrin slaves to a great ape who wants to be King and God of all. Ilna defeats the ape with her weaving and battles Hili, the Queen of Hell. Upon killing Hili, Ilna becomes the Sister, the second of the returned gods.

Sharina remains on Pandah as regent where she is confronted by a new religion worshiping Lord scorpion. A mysterious figure Black enters Sharina's dreams and tells her that she is to be the high priestess of this new religion. Scorpions now run loose through the city, working as spies. Sharina befriends Burne, a speaking rat, who acts as her personal scorpion catcher. Brune is instrumental in capturing one of the new priests of the scorpion cult, a former priest of the Shepherd. When the priest is questioned he reveals that Black always appears in his dreams, and tells him where to preach, confirming for Sharina that she was not merely having a bad dream. As Black's plot is unveiled, Sharina besieges the former Temple of the Shepherd where Black has made a fortress. She defeats a large scorpion with the help of the army and then duels Black alone. Upon his doom she becomes the Lady, the first of the returned gods.

=== Epilogue ===
King Garric and his wife Liane supervise the erection of a new temple devoted to the three gods. They carve statues for Sharina, the Lady; Cashel, the Shepherd; and Ilna, the Sister. With the help of the Gods, Garric says, they will rule.

== Reception ==
In Booklist, Roland Greek wrote, "Drake has a well-known ability to make the nasty really nasty, and the fates the new gods threaten for Garric and company are quite unspeakable. The conclusion suggests some hope, also that Drake may be done traveling the road to the Isles." Calling the book a "shallow conclusion to the Crown of the Isles trilogy", Publishers Weekly said, "Facing this triple threat with courage, ingenuity and a bit of fancy wizardry, Drake's heroes often glide too easily through their challenges. Though his characterization of women has greatly improved since the series began, most of the people appear bland compared with the challenges they face."
