= Northworld =

1990 novel by David Drake

- First edition (publ. Ace Books); Cover art by Tony Roberts
- Author: David Drake
- Genre: Militaristic science fiction
- Publisher: Ace Books
- Publication date: 1990
- ISBN: 978-0-441-84830-0
- Followed by: Vengeance (1991)

Northworld is a 1990 militaristic science fiction novel by David Drake set in a time when the Consensus rules everything except for Northworld, the missing planet. It is the first novel in the Northworld Trilogy. The other novels of the trilogy are Vengeance (1991) and Justice (1992).

== Plot summary ==
The novel begins with Commissioner Nils Hansen and his Special Police Unit team in a violent confrontation with criminal android Solbarth and his gang members, who are barricaded in a building. Because of his reputation, Hansen is able to talk Solbarth and his gang members into surrendering with the promise that their lives would be spared. As the villains are being led away, Hansen is summoned by non-human messengers, who take him to the leaders of the Consensus. The Consensus needs Hansen's skill and ruthlessness to discover what has happened to cause Northworld to disappear.

The planet Northworld, named after Captain North who was in charge of the colonization of the planet, is missing. The Consensus rules 1200 worlds, every world that is known except for Northworld. The Consensus initially wanted to colonize Northworld. Prior to the events in the novel, five expeditions, consisting of three fleets and a colonizing expedition, had been sent to Northworld to either colonize or investigate the disappearance. The first fleet and the colonizing expedition consisted of humans. Between the first fleet and the colonizing expedition, Captain North, and his team, were sent to investigate the second fleet, which was crewed by androids (similar to the replicants of Blade runner). The third fleet was composed of sentient machines. In each case the expedition disappears. At the opening of the series, Commissioner Hansen is sent alone to investigate the missing planet.

Hansen first arrives in Diamond, a peaceful world that forbids weapons of any kind. Hansen encounters a warm welcome from the curious people, but he finds that the weapons he carries begin to disintegrate; however, he does not stay in Diamond long. Ruby, another world occupying the same dimensional space as Diamond, interposes itself over Diamond, causing Diamond's destruction.

Hansen then travels to a very different part of the Matrix called the Open Lands. There, he is greeted by Walker (who later reveals himself as North), who takes on the appearance of several talking animals, gives Hansen advice, and tries to gain his oath of allegiance. Hansen refuses, and instead decides to go out on his own, entering into the land filled with warfare.

Hansen is originally ignored by the battling warriors and left for the slaves to kill and take what they want from him. Hansen is forced to kill the slaves after they attack him to get his clothing. He then sees a suit of left behind armor that was left in the snow and follows Lord Golsingh’s army back to Lord Golsingh's town called Peace Rock, where he wins a place in the army by challenging one of the soldiers to fight him. The people, though they live in primitive conditions with little technology, have very sophisticated powered armor. This Armor has one major weapon, an electric arc extending from the suit's gauntlets. Length as well as power density can be controlled by opening and closing the thumb and forefinger of the gauntlet. A secondary weapon is the bolt, a single, one-time discharge of arc energy. this is little-used, as it renders the suit powerless for a time while it recharges. The suit is completely vulnerable to attack during this period. The suits also have some shielding, the ability of which to withstand attack depending on the quality of the armor. Hansen describes his impression of the world thusly: “The whole thing was barbaric and pre-technological; whereas the warriors’ armor was extremely sophisticated, though idiosyncratic.” Nothing provides insight into how this can be. The smiths that repair the armor claim that the armor cannot be fixed solely with human skill, but the smith must instead mentally enter the Matrix to repair the armor. As Hansen discovers, the armor is not understood by the people.

Often setting aside his original objective of finding North, Hansen begins to become a part of the society. Hansen learns the customs of the society and he teaches the warriors how to fight in teams and so become more effective, but not without obstacles. Previously, the warriors had little tactics, but through the guidance of Hansen, the army is turned into a successful force that would be able to conquer the opposing merchant army in a quest for peace for the war-filled land — a dream that is a priority for Lord Golsingh.

Meanwhile, the gods of the land encounter many problems and friction. All the worlds of the Matrix are threatened by destruction. Diamond has been destroyed by Ruby, a militaristic and heavily armed world of the Matrix, and the gods decide that Ruby's destruction will eliminate the threat to the Matrix. After the battle with the merchants, Hansen finds himself in a room similar to that in which he was briefed on his mission by the Consensus. It is here that Hansen meets the gods that rule Northworld, the head of which is Captain North. Hansen is told to destroy Ruby in retaliation for the destruction of Diamond. In the process, Hansen must be made into a god so that he can enter Ruby from inside the Matrix.

== Reception ==
The novel was praised as supplying "fast-paced adventure with convincing depth."
