= Queen of Demons =

1998 novel by David Drake

- Author: David Drake
- Cover artist: Donato Giancola
- Language: English
- Series: Lord of the Isles
- Genre: Epic fantasy novel
- Publisher: St. Martin's Press
- Publication date: 1 January 1998
- Publication place: United States
- Media type: Print (Hardback & Paperback)
- Pages: 479 pp
- ISBN: 978-0-312-86468-2
- OCLC: 38925267
- Dewey Decimal: 813/.54 21
- LC Class: PS3554.R196 Q44 1998
- Preceded by: Lord of the Isles
- Followed by: Servant of the Dragon

Queen of Demons (1998) is a fantasy novel by American writer David Drake, part of the series Lord of the Isles.

== Plot introduction ==
This book in the series covers approximately 35 days, starting on the second day of the second month (Heron) and ending on the seventh day of the third month (Partridge). For the most part it follows the adventures of two men (Garric and Cashel) and four women (Liane, Ilna, Tenoctris, and Sharina) as they are split up into parallel worlds and slowly reunite, culminating in the defeat of two of their enemies: the Queen and the Beast.

== Plot summary ==
In the introduction, the current King of the Isles, Valence III, and his wizard, Silyon, make a deal with the Beast to regain control of his kingdom from his wife, the Queen. Meanwhile, the main characters are in Erdin where they discover the dead remains of a Scaled Man on their ship, which Tenoctris sees as a bad omen. With the exception of Ilna, they book passage on the ship Lady of Mercy, bound for the Isle of Valles, where Garric intends to declare himself King of the Isles. Before they leave, Ilna gives Liane a sash that she has woven which will notify her if Liane is ever in trouble. Before the ship reaches Valles, a lens appears in the sky and swallows the ship, causing it to wreck.

Garric, Liane, and Tenoctris awake, following the shipwreck, in the land of the Ersa. They eventually make it back to their own world. There they are picked up by a hunting party, led by the noble, Lord Royhas. Rather than dispose of Garric, as he was ordered to, Royhas takes Garric back into the city and holds a council with several other powerful nobles. They express their loyalty to the King but ask Garric's help in overthrowing the Queen. Tenoctris uses a mirror to spy on the Queen and discovers that she is a demon. Garric plans an attack on the mansion. When they've passed all the Queen's safeguards, Garric uses iron to destroy the Queen's gate to another world, but she has already escaped. Following this, Garric appoints himself Prince Regent under King Valence III and demands the allegiance of the Lords who backed him in the revolt. Meanwhile, Admiral Nitker, of the Royal Navy, has declared himself the new Lord of the Isles. Garric promises to destroy Admiral Nitker and the rebellious navy if they don't return to the King's service. Garric goes before King Valence III and receives his blessing as Prince Regent. Tenoctris discovers that the Queen's mansion was a nexus of portals to many different worlds, one of which led to the Beast.

Cashel uses his quarterstaff to escape the lens that swallowed the ship and saves Sharina as well. They are rescued by Folquin, King of the nearest Isle, and his two wizards, Helphemos and Cerix. Folquin then seeks to marry Sharina. When Helphemos' talking ape, Zahag, throws a fit during a chess game with Liane, Cashel attempts to settle him down. Helphemos casts a spell to immobilize the ape but the wizardess Silya secretly interferes and sends them to another world. Folquin immediately has Helphemos arrested. Cashel awakes after the transportation on a parallel island of Pandah. He and Zahag meet the lady Sosia who asks Cashel to save her daughter, Aria, who is imprisoned by a wizard Ilmed and the Scaled Men who serve him. Cashel and Zahag succeed in rescuing the princess Aria, but she is less than thrilled. They flee through several magical portals, eventually ending up back on the Isle of Pandah. After they defeat the wizardess Silya, Princess Aria (who has decided to marry Folquin) arranges a boat to help Cashel find Sharina. They arrive in Valles where they run into Ilna, Cerix, and Helphemos and then make their way to the palace where they find Garric, Liane, and Tenoctris.

Sharina and Cerix break Helphemos out of prison and then they go in search of Ilna for help in recovering Cashel. But a wizard with the appearance and voice of Nonnus, Sharina's one-time protector, shows up and tricks her into leaving with him on another ship. Cerix and Helphemos continue on their way to find Ilna. Sharina eventually discovers the treachery and jumps ship. She is rescued by a large man, named Hanno, who takes her to his home on the Isle of Bight. A phantasm and a group of Hairy Men sent by the Queen attack Hanno and Sharina, but they defeat them. They later discover that the Hairy Men have destroyed Hanno's boat. While searching for a way off the island, the false Nonnus and his crew discover Sharina. The spirit of the true Nonnus comes to her, possesses her body temporarily, and destroys her pursuers. She and Hanno make their way to the volcano at the center of the island and climb to the top. From there they can see that the Hairy Men, led by phantasms, are building boats so they can attack Ornifal. One of the phantasms captures Sharina and conveys her to the Queen. The Queen shows Sharina images of her friends (and an image of the Hairy Men on their way to Valles) and implies that she controls their fates through a chess board. The Queen tells Sharina that she intends to use her to find the Throne of Malkar. Sharina watches as the fleet of Hairy Men reaches the Royal Navy and destroys it, but Admiral Nitker escapes. When the Queen threatens to send a giant ammonite against Cashel, Sharina agrees to help her.

Ilna begins setting up shop in Erdin, but this time with the intent to good rather than evil. Using her craft she begins improving the conditions of the city. But Cerix and Helphemos eventually find her and seek her help in recovering her brother Cashel. Cerix realizes that many of Ilna's patterns contain writings in the Old Script—even though she can't read or write. She agrees to go with them. Before they can leave Erdin, though, they are captured by a band of Scaled Men. They load Ilna onto a ship and travel through a portal. Cerix and Helphemos find her sash, which she dropped during her tussle with the Scaled Men. It reveals a spell that takes them into a desert world. When Ilna's captors are attacked by Flyers, Ilna leaps through a portal opened by Cerix and Helphemos. Just as they seem to be succumbing to the desert, The People of Beauty arrive and rescue them. Ilna convinces the People of Beauty to transport them to the city of Divers on Third Atara. They seek out the Baron Robilard. In his palace, Helphemos gets into trouble and Baron Robilard has him arrested. Ilna goes to Robilard to seek Helphemos’ release. Robilard makes demands, which Ilna fulfills, though to unfavorable results. A humbled Robilard frees Helphemos and offers to personally escort them to Valles. When they get there, Ilna is relieved when she finally finds Cashel. They make their way to the castle where they find Garric, Liane, and Tenoctris.

When all except Sharina have been reunited, they set out to find the lair of the Beast. Admiral Nitker arrives in Valles to warn them of the oncoming invasion of Hairy Men. Garric immediately orders preparations for battle. The Queen forces Sharina to participate in a spell which is meant to reveal the Throne of Malkar. Instead they learn that it is Garric, not Sharina, that the Queen needs. In the castle, the wizard Silyon and Admiral Nitker kidnap Liane and turn her over to the Beast, fifty meters down a well. At this point Ilna tears her sash and it reveals how to rescue Liane, by giving the key words (in the Old Script) needed to enter its lair. Garric enters the well and Ilna, Cerix, and Helphemos follow him down. The Beast attacks them, revealing that the Yellow King had imprisoned it there long ago and that it had lured them there to release it from its prison. It devours Helphemos and a grieving Cerix finishes the incantation so that the Beast can't escape. Instead it dissolves into fiery lava, unable to die because of its immortality, endlessly burning. Meanwhile, Tenoctris opens up the Queen's escape portal and Cashel and Zahag travel through it to where she is holding Sharina captive. He uses his staff to destroy the Queen and rescue Sharina. They meet back up with Tenoctris. A little later, Ilna, Cerix, Garric, and Liane arrive, escaping from the Beast's lair. Tenoctris and Cashel confiscate the Queen's chessboard. Tenoctris notes that the Queen herself was a pawn on the board, just like those she tried to manipulate. She and Cashel also notice the appearance of a new piece on the board—representing an island-sized black ammonite that an unknown wizard has just called up from the depths of the ocean.

== Characters ==
=== Main characters ===
- Garric or-Reise—a direct descendant of the last King of the Isles, King Carus, and a descendant of King Lorcan who hid the evil Throne of Malkar. His ancestor, King Carus, has taken up residence in his head and aids him in matters of sword and state.
- Sharina os-Reise—Garric's half-sister. Many malevolent powers, including the Queen, seek to use her to find the Throne of Malkar.
- Cashel or-Kenset—a large, simple shepherd who left his home on the Isle of Haft to seek his fortune due to his unrequited love for Sharina. He is half human, half sprite. His power is manifest through his use of a quarterstaff.
- Ilna os-Kenset—Cashel's sister who is attempting to mend the wrongs she perpetrated in the previous book due to her unrequited love for Garric. She is half human, half sprite. Her power is manifest through her use of thread and fabric.
- Liane bos-Benliman—a noble born woman who has some magical abilities and is romantically involved with Garric.
- Tenoctris—a wizardess from the past who mysteriously transported herself in the future to avoid the downfall of the Isles. Her powers are limited, but her temperament is determined.

=== Secondary Characters ===
- Admiral Nitker—Admiral of the Royal Navy who declares himself the Lord of the Isles
- Aria—a princess rescued by Cashel from the wizard who held her captive
- Ansule—Hanno's business partner who is killed by the Hairy Men
- The Beast—a demon-god, worshiped by the Scaled Men, which was imprisoned eons ago by the Yellow King
- Captain Koras—leader of a fortress where they nightly fight the malformed monsters of the jungle
- Cerix—an older wizard, Helphemos’ mentor, who lost his legs when trying to cross into another world
- Gothelm—a servant of the Queen who reveals the way into her mansion past her protective spells
- Graz—a member of the Ersa race who helps Garric to escape their world
- Helphemos—formerly Alos or-Noman, a young, talented wizard who believes he has caused Cashel misfortune and is trying to correct his mistake
- Hanno—a large man who helps Sharina escape her captors
- Ilmed—a sorcerer who keeps the princess Aria captive in a tower
- King Carus—Garric's distant ancestor, former King of the Isles, who shares Garric's mind
- King Folquin—King of the Isle of Pandah
- King Valence III—the current King of the Isle of Valles and King of the Isles
- Lady Tamana—the one-time mistress of Lord Robilard
- Lord Royhas—a nobleman of the Isle of Valles who helps Garric to overthrow the Queen
- Lord Waldron—a powerful nobleman of the Isle of Valles who helps Garric to overthrow the Queen
- Lunifra—a malevolent sorceress who has aligned herself with Rodoard
- Maidus—a young boy who helps Ilna by delivering her tapestries and gathering information for her
- Nimet or-Konya—a wizard who disguises himself as Nonnus in order to fool Sharina
- Nonnus—a hermit who died protecting Sharina
- The Queen—a half demon, half Hairy Man sorceress who married King Valence III and seeks to find the Throne of Malkar
- Robilard—Baron of Third Atara
- Rodoard—Leader of a band of miscreants in a parallel world
- Silya—a wizardess who seeks to subvert her brother Silyon
- Silyon—a wizard aligned with King Valence III who seeks to release the Beast
- Sosia—the Lady of Pandah, who entreats Cashel to save her daughter, Aria
- Tayuta—the wizardess who predicted that Cashel would save the princess Aria
- The Yellow King—a mysterious wizard who imprisoned the Beast in the distant past
- Unarc—a bald hunter who is a friend of Hanno
- Xochial—the demon who fathered the Queen
- Zahag—an ape, from the Isle of Sandrakkan, given the ability to talk (by Helphemos) who accompanies Cashel

=== Creatures ===
- Hairy Men—the inhabitants of Bight which seem to be based on Neanderthals
- Scaled Men—a variety of reptilian humanoids
- Ersa—vaguely humanoid creatures which communicate using the outer membranes of their ears
- Flyers—winged humanoid creatures
- Brontotheria
- Ammonites
- Sea wolves—reptilian sea creatures whose description resembles that of a Mosasaur
- Trolls
- Salamanders
- Cyclopes
- Liches
- Demons

== Other ==
There may be some relationship to the writings of Robert William Chambers and the Cthulhu Mythos as there are frequent mentions of the Yellow King (p. 31, 590, 607, etc.) as well as giving the appellation “the Old Ones” (p. 533) to the island-sized ammonites. Furthermore, one of the major cities is named Carcosa.

== Reviews ==
The book has received a number of reviews:

- Review by Faren Miller (1998) in Locus, #452 September 1998
- Review by Carolyn Cushman (1998) in Locus, #453 October 1998
- Review by Victoria Strauss (1998) in SF Site, September 1998, (1998)
- Review by Kathy Taylor (2000) in Vector 211
