= Dragontooth =

Dragontooth may refer to:

- BLU-43 Dragontooth, an air-dropped, cluster-type land mine
- Dragontooth: The Prequel, a 2009 horror novel
- Dragontooth Organization, a fictional vigilante organization

== See also ==
- Dragon's teeth (disambiguation)
