= Lord of the Isles series =

Series of fantasy books by author David Drake

Lord of the Isles is a series of books by author David Drake. In 1997, Drake began his largest fantasy series, Lord of the Isles, using elements of Sumerian religion and medieval-era technology. The series consists of nine books broken into two distinct parts, the Lord of the Isles consisting of the first six books, and a final trilogy dubbed the Crown of the Isles.

== Novels ==
Lord of the Isles

1. Lord of the Isles (1997, ISBN 0-312-85396-3)
2. Queen of Demons (1998, ISBN 0-312-86468-X)
3. Servant of the Dragon (1999, ISBN 0-312-86469-8)
4. Mistress of the Catacombs (2001, ISBN 0-312-87387-5)
5. Goddess of the Ice Realm (2003, ISBN 0-312-87388-3)
6. Master of the Cauldron (2004, ISBN 0-312-87496-0)

Crown of the Isles trilogy

1. The Fortress of Glass (2006, ISBN 0-7653-1259-X)
2. The Mirror of Worlds (2007, ISBN 0-7653-1260-3)
3. The Gods Return (2008, ISBN 0-7653-1261-1)

Short stories

1. "The Elf House" (2004, published in Masters of Fantasy, ISBN 1-4165-0927-5)

== Plot summary ==
=== General outline ===
The books center on the lives of four youths from a small village on one of the islands that make up the archipelago of the book's world, known as the Isles. In the first novel, the character Garric or-Reise discovers that he is, in fact, the direct descendant of the last king to rule the Isles, exactly a millennium ago. Then, as now, the power that fueled all magic in the world rose precipitously, allowing the use of spells so powerful that they shattered the cohesion of nations, driving them apart and in the process killing Garric's ancestor, Carrus, and sinking the island of Yole.

The novels deal with Garric's claim to the throne of the Isles, and his attempts to unite them once again. In the process, he and his companions are challenged by foes both physical and supernatural, which they must overcome. The basic outline of many of the novels deals with the characters being split apart, often taken to parallel universes or distant periods in time, by some hostile entity or group, which they must then defeat before, or in the process of, re-uniting.

Magic in the series is based on a now-dead language, the Old Script. Its characters are usually drawn using an athame (made of a variety of substances including iron, twigs and ivory) and the words spoken aloud. The introduction states that these are actual incantations from the Classical world.

=== Main characters ===
- Garric or-Reise
- Sharina os-Reise
- Cashel or-Kenset
- Ilna os-Kenset
- Tenoctris the Wizard (bos-Tandor)
- Liane bos-Benliman

== Reception ==
The series has been described as popular.

Authors of the Contemporary Authors New Revision Series: A Bio-Bibliographical Guide quoted praise for the book, writing that "In Drake's Lord of the Isles, the author 'uses his experience writing military and historical sf to craft an intricate first book in a new epic fantasy series,' commented Susan Hamburger in Library Journal. Booklist reviewer Roland Green, commenting that Drake is suited to the saga form, found the cast 'large and well drawn, the pacing brisk, the world building outstanding.' ... 'Imaginative world-building and attention to magical details makes this a good choice for most fantasy collections," argued Jackie Cassada in Library Journal.' " .

In Sequels: An Annotated Guide to Novels in Series, the authors wrote about the series that "Drake, who has strong interests in history and mythology, is producing his own Arthurian saga, Lord of the Isles...", which they then describe as a "mixture of SF, fantasy, and Celtic mythology".
