= Hammer's Slammers (board game) =

1984 board wargame

Hammer's Slammers is a board wargame published by Mayfair Games in 1984 that is based on the identically titled collection of military science fiction short stories by David Drake.

== Description ==
Hammer's Slammers is a two-player board wargame using a hex grid map where players control various military units including "Hammer's Slammers", a mercenary regiment commanded by Colonel Alois Hammer.

Game play is very similar to PanzerBlitz, using an alternating series of turns. The first player has the following phases:

- Rally units
- Paradrop (the other player can attempt counter paradrop fire)
- Movement
- Indirect fire (both players)
- Counter-artillery fire
- Direct fire
- Close assault

The second player then has the same phases, completing one game turn.

The game includes a number of scenarios, as well as rules for designing scenarios.

== Publication history ==
In 1979, Hammer's Slammers, a collection of science fiction short stories by David Drake was published. Five years later, Mayfair Games was busy acquiring licenses to produce board games based on literary pieces such as The Forever War based on the novel by Joe Haldeman and Dragonriders of Pern based on the novels by Anne McCaffrey. Another license Mayfair acquired was for Hammer's Slammers, and a board game followed shortly.

Following the demise of Mayfair, the board game license lapsed, and was acquired in the 21st century by Miniatures Wargames Pireme Publishing Ltd., who produced a set of rules in 2004 for a traditional tabletop miniatures wargame titled The Hammer's Slammers Handbook.

== Reception ==
Dana Lombardy, writing for Isaac Asimov's Science Fiction Magazine, thought that although the game was slightly more advanced than more basic games, it was still "very good for beginners". Lombardy also gave the game a Solitaire Rating of "Very Good."

In Issue 75 of The Space Gamer, Jerry Epperson admired the quality of the components, noting, "The box cover is a beautiful reprint of the original cover art from [David Drake's book], the counters are in bright and easily discernible colors, and even the map is of excellent quality." Epperson felt the best thing about this game was "that it will satisfy almost any boardgamer interested in a 'shoot-em-up' game. The rules are short (taking up only seven pages of the 16-page booklet) and simple enough for a beginner, yet the scenarios are complex enough to keep even the advanced player happy." However, Epperson was not happy that the rules for indirect fire, counter artillery fire and morale did not match the effects set in Drake's short stories. Epperson concluded, "If you enjoy the simplicity and groundbreaking innovation that PanzerBlitz brought to boardgaming in the early 1970s, you'll love this one. However, if you are looking for anything new in game design – disappointment is only $17 away."

== Reviews ==
- Analog Science Fiction and Fact
