= Servant of the Dragon =

1999 fantasy novel by David Drake

- Author: David Drake
- Cover artist: Donato Giancola
- Language: English
- Series: Lord of the Isles
- Genre: Epic fantasy novel
- Publisher: St. Martin's Press
- Publication date: August 1999
- Publication place: United States
- Media type: Print (Hardback & Paperback)
- Pages: 479
- ISBN: 0-312-86469-8
- Preceded by: Queen of Demons
- Followed by: Mistress of the Catacombs

Servant of the Dragon (1999) is a fantasy novel in the series Lord of the Isles by author David Drake.

== Plot summary ==
In the introduction, seven wizards use a mummified reptilian creature to cast a spell to raise Yole from the depths. Meanwhile, the main characters are in Valles, where a magical blue bridge has appeared where there hasn't been a bridge for hundreds of years. Upon seeing it Tenoctris ascertains that while it is dangerous, it is not associated with the evil Throne of Malkar. While investigating the bridge and the mysterious happenings associated with it, a massive bird appears, snatches up Sharina, and disappears with her.

Cashel immediately determines to find Sharina and rescue her. Tenoctris uses her art and determines that whoever sent the bird to kidnap Sharina means her no harm. She sends Cashel to Landure, a wizard on another plane who can help him. Cashel arrives next to an ajar door; a beautiful woman rushes out, pursued by an angry wizard. Cashel fights the wizard, using his quarterstaff, and kills him. The woman, Colva, takes Cashel to Landure's castle where she puts him into a drug-induced stupor through which he discovers that she is actually a demoness. When Cashel recovers, he returns to the body of the wizard, who was in actuality Landure. Cashel discovers that Landure's sapphire ring contains a powerful demon, named Krias. Krias informs Cashel that he must take a small wafer from Landure's body which can be used to animate a new body and bring Landure back—but he must travel through the Underworld to reach Landure's extra bodies. Cashel takes Krias with him. Eventually Cashel reaches the entrance to the third level of the underworld where Colva originally stayed. While there, Cashel eats some of the fruit of the Tree of Life. At Krias' suggestion, Chashel puts one of the fruit in his satchel. Cashel comes to Landure's castle where he puts the wafer under the tongue of one of the paintings of Landure. Cashel gives Krias back to Landure. When Landure begins insulting Cashel, Krias refuses to serve him anymore, prompting Landure to give Krias back to Cashel. In exchange for his freedom from the sapphire, Krias helps Cashel to cross the Chasm and reach Sharina.

Garric, Liane, and Tenoctris stay in Valles to deal with the problem of the bridge. Garric also faces possible rebellion from several lords and bickering among others. Hoping to kill two birds with one stone, Garric assigns Lord Tadai to be ambassador to Sandrakkan. Garric has several dreams about Klestis, a city destroyed at the same time Yole was, and the wizard, Ansalem. Ansalem possessed many objects of power, including a mummy of a reptilian creature, a foot-wide fossilized ammonite, and a powerful amphisbaena. King Carus reveals that he once sought Ansalem's help in unifying the isles, but Ansalem refused. Ansalem had seven acolytes (the most dangerous of which was Purlio) who used the ammonite to imprison him while he was weak after rescuing Klestis from the destruction of Yole. Anselm reveals that he has nothing to do with the bridge, but if he can get his amphisbaena back, he can repair it. Tenoctris determines that she needs to visit a wizard named Alman and borrow his viewing crystal. Katchin the Miller, who raised Cashel, appears begging Garric for a job, but Garric turns him away (and he is later captured by Colva). Tenoctris takes them to the end of time. They find Alman in a ruined city and he discovers that his viewing crystal has been stolen from him. The group returns to their own time, leaving Alman in his solitude. After spending a few days tending to matters of state in Valles, Garric receives news that his uncle has helped someone to kidnap Tenoctris. Garric and some of the Blood Eagles cross through a portal to ancient Klestris, to retrieve her but are thwarted. Before returning to Valles, they rescue a woman who claims that she is Colva, wife of Landure, the Guardian, and warns them that seven necromancers intend to do battle with them. She opines that they have kidnapped Tenoctris in order to sacrifice her and increase their own magical powers. At midnight they cross the bridge which showed up at the beginning of the story, to attack the seven necromancers on Klestis. They are confronted with an army of undead under the control of three necromancers, whom they slay. They find Tenoctris unconscious in Ansalem's chambers. Purlio and another of the acolytes are casting spells on her. Purlio takes the fossil ammonite and merges it with himself, replacing his head with it. Armies of undead begin entering Klestis, coming across bridges similar to the one that first set these events in motion.

Ilna determines that she can be of no further help in Valles, so she negotiates passage to Sandrakkan with Lord Tadai. Ilna reluctantly makes friends with Lord Tadai's niece, Merota. The first night on the ship, Ilna and a tough-looking sailor named Chalcus, witness the beginnings of a mutiny. Ilna tries to warn the captain and Lord Tadai of the imminent mutiny, but they ignore her. The mutiny takes place, as Ilna had warned, and the sailors put everyone except Merota and Ilna ashore on an island. Eventually they arrive at Yole and put ashore. That night they are attacked by a monster. Frightened, the sailors put Ilna, Merota, and Chalcus ashore to reconnaissance. In the interior of the island they discover a harbor bordered by a polis full of reanimated dead people. As they watch, a swarm of Great Ones tow their now-empty ships into the harbor. As they make their way around the island, a creature called the Tall Thing (which was once Ansalemn's child) kidnaps Merota. While pursuing it, Ilna is captured by a wizard named Ewis (one of Ansalem's apprentices) who has the Lens of Rushila. In trying to escape, Ilna releases the Tall Thing which kills and eats Ewis. They meet back up with Chalcus and make their way to the harbor. There they discover that the crews of their ships have been murdered and then reanimated. They flee and spend the night in a cavern. They come to a chasm with a bridge which takes them to a frozen Klestis. There they find Purlio (with his ammonite head) performing incantations using the Dragon. A second necromancer attacks them with three ice beetles. Chalcus defeats the ice beetles while Ilna subdues the necromancer long enough for Merota to bash in his head with a rock. Then they attack Purlio.

Sharina is carried by the bird through several planes of existence, including some which are disturbing and grotesque. Finally it deposits her on a beach next to a forest and promptly disappears. Inside a broken-down temple covered with images of serpents she meets a reptilian creature, the Dragon. He reveals that he has brought her back to the past to send her on a mission to recover his mummy which is being used to raise Yole and reanimate the dead. He gives her a snakeskin which she is to take with her back to her own time. Then she goes through a portal and finds herself centuries into the future. She hires a graceful, large bird-like being, named Dalar, as her bodyguard. The pass through several more portals. The last takes them to Klestis at the time when Ansalem was rescuing it during the destruction of Yole. They climb to Ansalem's chambers where they find his seven acolytes and the Dragon. Ansalem is bound and his son has been vivisected and is being transformed into the Tall Thing.

Sharina and Dalar are locked out, but at that moment Cashel appears and uses his quarterstaff to punch open the door. When they come through, though, instead of the seven necromancers, they find Garric and Tenoctris. Purlio has escaped. Tenoctris casts a spell which takes them to the frozen time where they encounter Purlio as well as Ilna and her companions. Together they defeat Purlio, but he flees and takes refuge in the land of the dead. The companions are whisked back to Ansalem's chambers. There Sharina burns the mummy and gives the snakeskin to Tenoctris—it is from an amphisbaena. While everyone is distracted, Colva attacks and kills Garric. Liane then kills Colva. In the land of the dead, Garric encounters Purlio and severs his connection to the living world, thus killing him completely. Cashel revives Garric using the fruit from the Tree of Life in his satchel. Using the amphisbaena snakeskin, Tenoctris frees Ansalem from the cyst he was trapped in. Ansalem returns everyone to their homes—including Dalar—and then destroys the bridges that connect the different planes of existence.

== Reviews ==
- Review by Kathy Taylor (2001) in Vector 215
