= Hammer's Slammers =

1979 science fiction book by David Drake

- First edition
- Author: David Drake
- Cover artist: Paul Alexander
- Language: English
- Series: Hammerverse
- Genre: Military science fiction
- Publisher: Ace Books
- Publication date: 1979
- Publication place: United States
- Media type: Print (Paperback)
- Pages: 273 pp (Paperback edition)
- ISBN: 0-441-31593-3
- OCLC: 38856076
- Preceded by: None (first in the series)
- Followed by: Cross the Stars

Hammer's Slammers is a 1979 collection of military science fiction short stories by author David Drake. It follows the career of a future mercenary tank regiment called Hammer's Slammers after their leader, Colonel Alois Hammer. This collection, and other novels and stories in the same setting, are collectively called the Hammer stories, and the setting is called the Slammers universe or the Hammerverse.

Each story in the novel follows various members of the Slammers, beginning with the regiment's creation by the government of the planet Friesland to suppress a revolt on the Friesland colony world of Melpomene. In this story, Colonel Hammer is the central character and transforms the unit into an independent mercenary organization. The reader is also introduced to recurring characters such as Joachim Steuben, Hammer's bodyguard and later commander of the Slammers' military police, a gay sociopath and master marksman devoted to his colonel; Sergeant (later Major) Danny Pritchard; recruit (later Sergeant-Commander) Rob Jenne; Margritte DiManzio, whose husband is killed by mercenaries from a different regiment and signs on with the Slammers; and Sergeant "Ripper Jack" Scratchard, who shows how the Slammers infantry ties in with the regiment's combat cars and hovertanks. The book concludes with the story "Standing Down," in which Friesland revolutionaries hire the Slammers to overthrow the government of Friesland. Colonel Hammer seizes control of the revolution and the planet, becomes President of Friesland, and his unit is reorganized as the 1st Regiment of the Friesland Defense Force.

Drake based the Slammers on his service with the 11th Armored Cavalry Regiment in Vietnam and Cambodia during the Vietnam War. The plots of his works are often inspired by historical or mythological sources. For example, he retells the story of Jason and the Argonauts in The Voyage, and part of the Odyssey in Cross the Stars. Other stories borrow from pulp-era fiction (The Sharp End is based on Dashiell Hammett's Red Harvest).

== Plot ==
The novel is split into a series of short stories which follow various characters and their interactions with the Hammer's Slammers regiment. After each short story is an interlude chapter. These chapters form short essays that Drake uses to expand the world of the Hammerverse.

=== But Loyal To His Own ===
The first story follows Colonel Hammer himself, as well as introducing Joachim Steuben, his right-hand man and bodyguard. It opens with a conversation between Secretary Tromp, a powerful politician from the wealthy planet Friesland, and a Friesland Guards armored regiment officer, in Tromp's office at the spaceport hotel on the Friesland colony world of Melpomene. The officer has just returned from traveling with Hammer and Steuben in a convoy of armored vehicles from one of Hammer's firebases to the spaceport. Hammer had used the convoy as bait to trick the remaining Melpomene rebels into attempting an ambush on the convoy, by leaking false information that Secretary Tromp was traveling in it.

In the meantime, Hammer is in the hotel lounge, where he confronts a former fellow officer, the commander of the Guards, who is incensed that Hammer had left the elite unit to command "foreign scum." He is then summoned to Tromp's office, but he orders Steuben and another of his men to wait in their hotel suite. During a heated discussion between Hammer and Tromp, it is revealed to the reader that Hammer's Regiment (the "Slammers") was originally Tromp's idea. After several Friesland units were unable to suppress Melpomene resistance to Friesland's attempt to control the production and export of "bluebright" (a valuable pharmaceutical plant and the main product of the planet), Hammer was directed to raise a mercenary regiment and recruit non-Friesland individuals with military experience. This unit was then funded and equipped by Friesland to crush the Melpomene rebels, which they have done successfully by various means, including chemical warfare and forcing Melpomene hostages to ride on vehicles in Slammers' convoys to prevent ambushes.

It is also revealed that as one of the conditions for recruiting the regiment, the government promised that all Slammers personnel would be granted full Friesland citizenship after completing their service on Melpomene and the regiment was demobilized. However, Tromp reneges on the deal. He orders Hammer to bring the entire mercenary regiment to the spaceport where it will be disbanded under the supervision of the Guards, who have been brought to Melpomene by Tromp for that purpose.

Hammer, unwilling to have his men disarmed (and most likely executed afterwards), attempts to change Tromp's mind by suggesting that Friesland hire out the Slammers to other planets. Tromp is unmoved by this argument, stating that this would destabilize the current interstellar political system; and that Hammer should remember his loyalty to Friesland, which is more important that any promises he made to his men. Angered, Hammer leaves Tromp's office for his hotel suite. Having anticipated Tromp's betrayal, he sends a prearranged signal to his Slammers.

As soon as Hammer leaves his office, Tromp dispatches a Guards team under the command of Hammer's enemy to the hotel suite to arrest or kill Hammer and the two men with him. However, Steuben and the other Slammer are expecting the Guards. They kill all but one of them; Hammer steps off the elevator and kills the last Guard as he attempts to escape down the corridor. The Slammers tanks and artillery in the hills around the spaceport begin destroying the Guards' armored vehicles, exposed on the open landing field. As the Slammers' tanks close in on the spaceport, Tromp flees through artillery fire to his waiting spaceship. However, Steuben has anticipated this and is already waiting for Tromp inside. The story ends with Tromp looking at Steuben's hands, not believing that his slim wrists could possibly support the weight of the heavy pistol he holds.

=== Interlude: Supertanks ===
Drake uses this short chapter to explain the nature of tank warfare in the future as well as how the tanks of the Hammer's Slammers regiment work. He details the fusion-powered hovercraft technology that keeps the air cushion tanks afloat, as well as the anti-personnel defences of the tanks, including the outward-facing directional mines that line the upper hulls. These are used to counter the unguided short-range anti-tank rockets ("buzz bombs") that, apart from anti-tank artillery shells ("tank killer rounds"), are the most dangerous weapons the hovertanks have to deal with on the battlefield.

=== The Butcher's Bill ===
Tank commander Sergeant Danny Pritchard is introduced as he recounts to his comrades how he joined the Slammers. On the planet Thrush, the Slammers have been hired by the planetary government to clear the Star Plain of the Densonite religious fanatics and the mercenary infantry regiment they have hired themselves. Also listening to Pritchard is a young-appearing woman named Sonna, who is a government advisor attached to the Slammers.

Later, after a short skirmish where the Slammers easily defeat a Densonite attack, Pritchard's section makes camp in a rural area of Thrush. Sonna arrives in an aircar and invites Pritchard to visit a religious shrine, and flies with him to a nearby structure made of an opaque, glass-like material. Pritchard is urged to enter the building by Sonna and is presented with various images of strange and alien creatures, bird-like in appearance; Sonna explains they are an alien race named the Hampers. Shaken, he leaves the ruin and Sonna explains that the Hampers were one of twenty races in a co-beneficial peace with the Gedel, a race capable of creating many wonders who called Thrush home. This shrine is one of twenty scattered over the planet, with the Star Plain holding the most important one. Sonna attempts to convince Pritchard of the Gedel way of pacifism that have become central to Thrush culture, regardless of the Densonites barring access to the Star Plain, but he dismisses this attitude as naive, as it is her government that has hired the Slammers to fight for them. Suddenly thoughful, Sonna returns Pritchard to his camp.

The next morning, the Slammers advance deeper into the Star Plain and make contact with the opposing mercenary regiment at the central shrine composed of irreplaceable Gedel structures, but lose several vehicles and their crews to an ambush. The enemy mercenaries have fortified themselves in the shrine, knowing the Slammers' employers won't allow the Regiment to attack and potentially damage the site. However, if the Slammers withdraw after suffering casualties, they will be labeled as quitters, which in turn will adversely affect their ability to land future contracts.

Despite Sonna's protestations, Colonel Hammer allows the use of the tanks' heavy 20 cm powerguns to flush out and kill the enemy. This has the foreseeable effect of destroying many of the Gedel buildings, but insures the Slammers' reputation as a unit that will do whatever it takes to win.

=== Interlude: The Church of the Lord's Universe ===
This interlude chapter explains the main faith of humanity in the future. An evolution of Christianity, the Universalist Church espouses that truth can be found by following the via stellarum (way of the stars). This focus on space travel helped early human colonisers and is the reason that many characters in the stories use the word "Via!" as an expletive.

=== Under the Hammer ===
New recruit Rob Jenne undergoes a baptism of fire on his first day with the Regiment while temporarily assigned as a gunner on a combat car commanded by an experienced sergeant ferrying him to the training unit. It vividly demonstrates the kind of life he can expect as a Slammer, in more ways than one.

=== Interlude: Powerguns ===
The notional science behind the weaponry used by Hammer's tanks, combat cars, and troops. Drake structured the weapons to be analogous to the M68 105mm heavy tank gun of the M60 Patton tank, the M2 Browning heavy machine gun, and the M1 Garand rifle, M3 "grease gun", and M1911A1 pistol.

=== Cultural Conflict ===
A Slammers outpost including Ripper Jack Scratchard and Rob Jenne is attacked by the indigenous aliens who are defending the tree-homes that hold the souls of their people. This story shows that the Slammers have the ability to employ poison gas in combat, mainly but not exclusively in artillery shells.

=== Interlude: Backdrop to Chaos ===
The political and social background to the Hammerverse.

=== Caught in the Crossfire ===
Margritte DiManzio's husband is killed by a patrol from another mercenary regiment after he objects to their village being used as bait to lure a Slammers column into an ambush. Convincing the mercenaries she is on their side, she bides her time until she can kill the three mercenaries present as they are about to commence the ambush. Rejected by her fellow villagers because in their culture women are supposed to nurture life, not kill, Margritte stands before the alerted Slammers combat cars and admits to her deeds before insisting that she should come along because "You can use my sort, soldier."

=== Interlude: The Bonding Authority ===
The financial and contractual aspect of mercenary warfare. The Bonding Authority arranges for payment of contracts, purchases of equipment, insurance, guarantees of performance, and acts as a guarantor of payment.

The influence of the Bonding Authority over the world of mercenary military units is such that without a guarantee from them, mercenary units will not accept a non-bonded contract unless they have no other options.

=== Hangman ===
Captain Danny Pritchard has a crisis of conscience after two Slammers officers go behind the Colonel's back to interfere with a civilian revolt that may result in a massacre, either of the civilians or the Slammers unless Pritchard can devise a plan to stop it. The story shows how ruthless Major Steuben and Colonel Hammer can be, and how ruthless Captain Pritchard must be when circumstances demand it.

=== Interlude: Table of Organisation and Equipment, Hammer's Regiment ===
List of units in the Slammers. These include the Regimental headquarters with the command staff and the Regiment's Fire Central fire control computer, which can take control of any vehicle-mounted powergun that bears on a target, usually airborne, and eliminate it; the training battalion that turns recruits into soldiers of the Regiment; the supply and support battalion; the Regiment's artillery batteries; the infantry, mounted on battery-powered single person hovercraft called skimmers; the combat car companies; and of course the regimental fist, the Slammers' tank companies. It also includes the Regiment's field police company, the "White Mice," mounted on combat cars and commanded by the dedicated and deadly Major Joachim Steuben, thought of by some in the know as Hammer's personal hatchetman.

=== Standing Down ===
The Slammers seize power in Friesland. It is suggested Colonel Hammer is able to do this because Major Joachim Steuben assassinated the politician who had hired the Regiment with a head shot from a pistol at a range of more than two kilometers. A Bonding Authority official investigating what had happened in this case accepts the Slammers' explanation that their patron had unfortunately caught a pistol bolt from a building being cleared that had a line of sight to where he had been standing on a balcony. (After all, no one is good enough to make a head shot with a pistol using iron sights from a mile away, and the powerguns used by the Regiment do not have telescopic sights. Right?) Colonel Hammer becomes President Hammer, and secures his position by marrying into one of the oldest noble families, the Tromps, that has been running the planet. Although the older Tromps are appalled by the marriage, his new bride sees Hammer as the man who can put Friesland to rights, and he is accepted by the citizens of Friesland as their new ruler. The Slammers go out of existence, being subsumed into the Friesland Defense Forces as the First Friesland Armored Regiment.

== Reception ==
Dave Langford reviewed Hammer's Slammers for White Dwarf #67, and stated that "Such are the lauded military virtues of the Slammers that (fearful that chicken-heartedness will prejudice their future contracts) they nobly disobey their own horrified employers' orders to stop slaughtering people and detonating irreplaceable shrines. If you like chainsaw massacres you'll love this."

Lynn Bryant reviewed Hammer's Slammers in Space Gamer/Fantasy Gamer No. 83. Bryant commented that "All in all there is a gritty feel to these novels that make you feel they show how life really would be if there ever are interstellar mercenaries."

== Reviews ==
- Review by Charles Platt (1979) in New Worlds, #216 September 1979
- Review by Ray Thompson (1979) in Science Fiction & Fantasy Book Review, October 1979
- Review by Richard E. Geis (1979) in Science Fiction Review, November 1979
- Review by Gary Gygax [as by E. Gary Gygax] (1980) in The Dragon Magazine, February 1980
- Review by Andy Sawyer (1985) in Paperback Inferno, #55
- Stanley, Steven (2006-07-23). "First of a military science-fiction series". The Roanoke Times.
- Lardas, Mike (2010-12-05). "'Hammer's Slammers' 3 fun for military sci-fi fans". The Daily News.
- "The Complete Hammer's Slammers: Volume One". Publishers Weekly. Vol. 253, no. 1. 2006-01-02. p. 40. EBSCOhost 20235468. Archived from the original on 2023-05-09.
