= David Drake =

American science fiction and fantasy author (1945–2023)

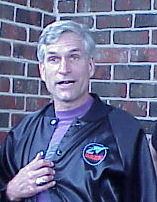
- Born: September 24, 1945; Dubuque, Iowa, U.S.
- Died: December 10, 2023 (aged 78); Silk Hope, North Carolina, U.S.
- Education: University of Iowa; Duke University School of Law
- Occupation: Author
- Writing career
- Language: English
- Genres: Science fiction, fantasy
- Notable works: Hammer's Slammers, RCN Series
- Website: david-drake.com

David A. Drake (September 24, 1945 – December 10, 2023) was an American author of science fiction and fantasy literature. A Vietnam War veteran, he worked as a lawyer before becoming a writer mostly in the military science fiction and fantasy genres.

== Biography ==
Drake graduated Phi Beta Kappa from the University of Iowa, majoring in history (with honors) and Latin. His studies at Duke University School of Law were interrupted for two years when he was drafted into the U.S. Army, where he served as an enlisted tank crewman with the 11th Armored Cavalry (the Black Horse Regiment) in Vietnam and Cambodia. After the war, from 1972 to 1980 he worked as the assistant town attorney in Chapel Hill, North Carolina. In 1981 he transitioned to full-time writing of science fiction literature. With Karl Edward Wagner and Jim Groce, he was one of the initiators of Carcosa, a small press company. He lived in Pittsboro, North Carolina.

In 2019, he announced that he might be suffering from Parkinson's disease. On November 17, 2021, he announced he was retiring from writing novels, due to unspecified cognitive health problems. Drake died on December 10, 2023, at the age of 78.

== Works ==
His best-known solo work is the Hammer's Slammers series of military science fiction. His newer RCN Series is a space opera inspired by the Aubrey–Maturin novels. In 1997, Drake began his largest fantasy series, Lord of the Isles, using elements of Sumerian religion and medieval technology. In 2007, Drake finished the series with its ninth volume. Between 2010 and 2015 he published another fantasy series of four novels, The Books of the Elements, based on the Roman Empire in approximately the time of Tiberias.

Drake co-authored novels with authors such as Karl Edward Wagner, S. M. Stirling, and Eric Flint. Typically Drake provided plot outlines (5,000–15,000 words) and the co-author did "the real work of developing the outline into a novel". He did not "consider [his] involvement to be that of a real co-author." Drake also contributed to the Heroes in Hell series.

A common element in most of his works was the focus on military themes, in particular the lives of regular soldiers.

Some of Drake's works are available for free download in the Baen Free Library.

== Adaptations ==
- Mayfair Games produced the licensed Hammer's Slammers board game (1984) based on David Drake's novel Hammer's Slammers.
- Mongoose Publishing adapted Drake's novel as the licensed setting Hammer's Slammers (2009) for the Traveller role-playing game.
- John Treadaway has adapted Hammer's Slammers into a wargame, of which several editions have been published. The game uses various miniatures from companies such as Brigade Models, Old Crow Models, and Ground Zero Games.
