= List of alternate histories diverging at the American Civil War =

American Civil War alternate histories are one of the two most popular points of divergence to create an alternate history in the English language, the other being an Axis victory in World War II. These works of fiction typically focus on a Confederate victory, but other variants include a Civil War being averted, British or French intervention in the conflict, a Union victory occurring under different circumstances, a massive Slave revolt succeeding without the Emancipation Proclamation, Lincoln never being assassinated by John Wilkes Booth, and retellings with fantasy elements.

== Novels ==
- "Hallie Marshall: A True Daughter of the South" by Frank Williams. The earliest Civil War alternate history. Published in 1900.
- "If the South Had Been Allowed to Go" by Ernest Crosby. Another early Civil War alternate history. Written in December 1903.
- "If the South Had Won the Civil War" by MacKinlay Kantor. Originally published in Look Magazine in 1960, published as a book in 1961.
- "If the North Had Won the Civil War" by Andrew J. Heller. A story set in a modern CSA, in which a history professor in the South writes an alternate history in which the North was victorious.
- "Sidewise in Time" by Murray Leinster. An alternate history in which the South won the American Civil War is briefly touched on, but is not the main focus of the story. Published in 1934.
- "1862" by Robert Conroy. Published on February 28, 2006.
- "Bring the Jubilee" by Ward Moore. Published in 1953.
- "The Shiloh Project" by David Poyer. Published October 1, 1981
- "Fire on the Mountain" by Terry Bisson. Instead of a Civil War breaking out between North and South there is a massive successful slave revolt in the Deep South with blacks creating their own separate nation called "Nova Africa" which leads to Socialist revolutions in France, the United States, Ireland, and Russia. Published in 1988.
- "Gettysburg: A Novel of the Civil War" by Newt Gingrich, William R. Forstchen, and Albert S. Hanser. Published May 1st, 2004.
- "Grant Comes East" by Newt Gingrich, William R. Forstchen, and Albert S. Hanser. Published April 1, 2005.
- "Never Call Retreat: Lee and Grant: The Final Victory" also by Newt Gingrich, William R. Forstchen, and Albert S. Hanser. Published May 16th, 2006.
- "Gray Victory" by Robert Skimin. Published February 1st, 1981.
- "The Guns of the South" by Harry Turtledove. Published September 1st, 1993.
- "A Rebel in Time" by Harry Harrison. Published February 15th, 1983.
- "The Forest of Time" by Michael F. Flynn, where a war among the Thirteen Colonies directly follows the American Revolution, resulting in a stillborn United States and a perpetually balkanized North America.First published in the June 1987 edition of the magazine Analog.
- "Russian Amerika" by Stoney Compton. The backstory is only vaguely defined, but the PoD seems to be a CSA victory in the 1860s. Published April 2007.
- The Southern Victory Series, by Harry Turtledove:
  - Standalone novels:
    - "How Few Remain" . Published 1997.
  - The Great War trilogy:
    - "American Front". Published 1998.
    - "Walk in Hell". Published 1999.
    - "Breakthroughs". Published 2000.
  - American Empire trilogy:
    - "Blood and Iron" . Published 2001.
    - "The Centre Cannot Hold". Published 2002.
    - "Victorious Opposition". Published 2003.
  - Settling Accounts Books:
    - "Return Engagement". Published 2004.
    - "Drive to the East". Published 2005.
    - "The Grapple". Published 2006.
    - "In at the Death". Published 2007.
- "War Between the Provinces" series by Harry Turtledove, a fantasy allegory of the Civil War set in imaginary countries with recognizable analogous characters such as King Avram, General Bart, and General Hesmucet.
  - Sentry Peak. Published 2000.
  - Marching through Peachtree. First published 2001.
  - Advance and Retreat. First published 2002.
- "Must and Shall", by Harry Turtledove. First published in 1996. Collected in anthology "Counting Up, Counting Down" in 2005.
- "Lee at the Alamo" by Harry Turtledove. Story published online on September 7, 2011.
- "Crosstime Traffic" series by Harry Turtledove. Visits many alternate realities, briefly mentioning a few where the South won the Civil War. The fourth volume The Disunited States of America focuses on a world where there were frequent small localized wars between states (e.g. Ohio versus Virginia, Massachusetts versus Rhode Island) but no single big civil war.
  - "Gunpowder Empire". Published December 5, 2003.
  - "Curious Notions". Published November 29th, 2005.
  - "In High Places". Published February 6th, 2007.
  - "The Disunited States of America". Published April 26th, 2011.
  - "The Gladiator". Published September 30th, 2008.
  - "The Valley-Westside War". Published March 31st, 2009.
- The "If It Had Happened Otherwise" anthology contains two relevant entries: "If Lee Had NOT Won the Battle of Gettysburg" by Winston Churchill, and "If Booth had Missed Lincoln" by Milton Waldman. First published 1931.
- "Abraham Lincoln, Vampire Hunter", by Seth Grahame-Smith, re-casts the Civil War as a war on vampires using slaves as a food source. First published March 2nd, 2010. Adapted into a film in 2012 starring Benjamin Walker as the titular presidential vampire hunter.
- The "Stars and Stripes trilogy" by Harry Harrison, in which the Trent affair and the death of Prince Albert (the husband of Queen Victoria) elicits a war between the Union and Britain, eventually seeing America reunited under one government.
  - "Stars and Stripes Forever". Published October 5th, 1998.
  - "Stars and Stripes in Peril". Published November 28th, 2000.
  - "Stars and Stripes Triumphant". Published December 2nd, 2003.
- "Alternate Generals", volume 1 - published July 1st, 1998 - contains three US Civil War-related stories:
  - "The Charge of Lee's Brigade" by S.M. Stirling. The American Revolution never happened, so Virginia and most of North America remain under British rule; in the mid 19th century, Brigadier General Sir Robert E. Lee and his lieutenants, including J. E. B. Stuart, fight against the Russians in an analogous Crimean War.
  - "An Old Man's Summer" by Esther Friesner. In the mid 20th century, Dwight D. Eisenhower dreams (maybe) that he time travels to the Battle of Gettysburg.
  - "A Hard Day for Mother" by William R. Forstchen. A look at what might have happened at Little Round Top had Joshua Chamberlain fought for the Confederacy rather than the Union.
- "East of Appomattox" (in Alternate Generals III) by Lee Allred. In the late 1860s, the CSA sends Ambassador Robert E. Lee to London to assure continued British recognition, and he finds unexpected challenges and even unlikelier allies. Published November 28th, 2011.
- "Alternate Presidents", published February 1992, contains four stories with wildly differing hypothetical US Civil War scenarios: "Chickasaw Slave" by Judith Moffett, "How the South Preserved the Union" by Ralph Roberts, "Now Falls the Cold, Cold Night" by Jack L. Chalker, and "Lincoln's Charge" by Bill Fawcett. In Roberts' and Chalker's entries, the Northern states seek to secede from the Southern-dominated Union.
- "Dirk Pitt" series: Volume 11: "Sahara" by Clive Cussler. This series recurring theme, wherein the heroes discover an astounding secret history, returns in this novel and involves the Lincoln assassination. It is a brief side plot only tenuously related to the main adventure, and this element is completely left out of the film adaptation of the novel. Published January 11, 2005.
- "The Lincoln Train" by Maureen F. McHugh, first published in 1995. The story appears in the Nebula Awards anthologies volume 31 (published April 1, 1997), "Alternate Tyrants" (published April 15, 1997), and "Best of the Best: 20 Years of the Year's Best Science Fiction" (Published February 1, 2005).
- "The Impeachment of Abraham Lincoln" by Stephen L. Carter. Published July 10, 2012.
- "If the Lost Order Hadn't Been Lost" by James M. McPherson, first printed in What If?, and reprinted in What Ifs? of American History.
- "Beyond the Wildest Dreams of John Wilkes Booth" by Jay Winik, first printed in What Ifs? of American History. Published January 10, 2003.
- "The Eternal War (TimeRiders #4)" by Alex Scarrow, in which Britain entered the American Civil War on the side of the Confederacy, turning the war into an unending stalemate. Without the United States to challenge its dominance, the British Empire continued to expand, and by 2001 it controls half the world. Published July 14, 2011.
- "Custer's Last Jump" by Howard Waldrop and various other writers, such as Bruce Sterling and Steven Utley. First published April 1, 2003. Reprinted in numerous anthologies.
- "Hush My Mouth" by Suzette Haden Elgin, first printed in "Alternative Histories: Eleven Stories of the World as It Might Have Been" in 1986.
- "All the Myriad Ways" by Larry Niven, with worlds of CSA victory being mentioned only briefly by the narrator in a list of alternate realities known in the story. First published in October 1968.
- "The Shores of Tomorrow", by David Mason the slave-holding South dominated a technologically backward US from its foundation until the 1940s - when a series of Northern rebellions led to the creation of three Free Republics taking up the interior and leaving the Southrons with "a slave-holding, vice-ridden burned out piece of the coast". Published in 1971 by Lancer Books.
- "Shattered Nation: An Alternate History of the American Civil War" by Jeffrey Evan Brooks. Published September 24, 2013.
- "Underground Airlines", by Ben H. Winters, President-elect Abraham Lincoln is assassinated in 1861, and a version of the Crittenden Compromise is adopted preventing the Civil War from occurring; as a result, slavery continues to the present in four southern states (the "Hard Four": Alabama, Louisiana, Mississippi, and a united Carolina); the title refers to the secret network assisting escaping slaves, updated from "Underground Railroad"; the protagonist is a black U.S. Marshal who is forced to work tracking down runaway slaves. First published July 5, 2016.
- "Britannia's Fist" (trilogy) by Peter Tsouras. England/France enter the War in 1863 when British built warships enter the CSA Navy instead of being seized by British forces before entering Confederate service (as what really happened).
  - "Britannia's Fist: From Civil War to World War", published July 30, 2008.
  - "A Rainbow of Blood: The Union in Peril", published July 1, 2010.
  - "Bayonets, Balloons, and Ironclads: A Civil War and World War Alternate History", published February 3, 2015.
- "Gettysburg: An Alternate History" by Peter Tsouras. First published in 1997. Republished on February 27, 2007.
- "Dixie Victorious: An Alternate History of the Civil War" by Peter Tsouras, a compilation of separate alternate history scenarios focusing on the CSA winning. First published January 1, 2006.
- "By Force of Arms" (published September 17, 2012), "Rebel Empire: A Novel of the Spanish Confederate War" (published December 10, 2013), "Reaping the Whirlwind" (published June 26, 2015), and "Flags & Honor" (published September 30, 2017) by Billy Bennett. A series of books that focus on a victorious CSA that has won the Civil War after the Battle of Gettysburg as well as its subsequent conflict with the USA under William Tecumseh Sherman in the Second American Civil War with aid from the French Empire, war with Spain over the territory of Cuba in 1895 called the Spanish–Confederate War, and an alternate World War I between the "Continental Entente" (consisting of the Confederate States and the French Empire) up against the "Grand Alliance" (consisting of the United States and the British Empire).
- "Stonewall Goes West: A Novel of the Civil War" (published March 21, 2013) and "Mother Earth, Bloody Ground: A Novel of the Civil War and What Might Have Been" (published May 8, 2014) by R.E. Thomas. Stonewall Jackson takes control of the Army of Tennessee during the Western Theatre of the American Civil War to bolster the Confederacy's chances there.
- "Confederate States: What Might Have Been" by Roger L. Ransom. Published October 17th, 2006.
- "The Wild Blue and the Gray" by William Sanders. A Civil War alternate history set during World War I where the Confederate States joins the Allies during World War I. Published in July 1991.
- "A Southern Yarn" by R.W. Richards, Jeff Bogart, and Nancy Willard-Chang. Robert E. Lee is able to trap Ulysses S. Grant during the Battle of North Anna River. Published July 1, 1990.
- "The Lost Regiment" series by William R. Forstchen. A Union Army regiment is transported into an alien world who face off against aliens such as the Tugar and the Bantag.
  - "Rally Cry (Lost Regiment #1)", published May 1, 1990.
  - "The Union Forever (Lost Regiment #2)", published February 5, 1991.
  - "Terrible Swift Sword (Lost Regiment #3)", published February 4, 1992.
  - "Fateful Lightning (Lost Regiment #4)", published January 1, 1993.
  - "Battle Hymn (Lost Regiment #5)", published January 1, 1997.
  - "Never Sound Retreat (Lost Regiment #6)", published January 1, 1998.
  - "A Band of Brothers (Lost Regiment #7)", published January 1, 1999.
  - "Men of War (Lost Regiment #8)", published December 1, 1999.
  - "Down to the Sea (Lost Regiment #9)", published December 1, 2000.
- "Clopton's Short History of the Confederate States of America 1861-1925" by Carole Scott. Published September 8, 2011.
- "Southern Cross: Annuit Coeptis" by Dorvall and Phillip Renne. Published December 16, 2013.
- "Confederate Star Rises" by Richard Small. Published December 9, 2012.

== Films and Television ==
- The Time Tunnel, episodes 12 ("The Death Trap" - aired September 23, 1966) and 25 ("The Death Merchant" - aired March 3, 1967).
- The Wild Wild West episode "The Night of the Lord of Limbo". Aired December 30, 1966.
- C.S.A.: The Confederate States of America, a mockumentary directed by Kevin Willmott. Released August 4, 2006.
- The Legend of Zorro (sequel to The Mask of Zorro, which is not Civil War-related). Released October 24, 2005.
- Abraham Lincoln, Vampire Hunter, released June 20, 2012. Adaptation of a novel.
- Abraham Lincoln vs. Zombies, released July 16, 2012.
- Confederate - a planned HBO television series after 2018. Recently put on indefinite hold after David Benioff and D.B. Weiss committed to new Star Wars projects.
- Black America - a planned Amazon Video television series that focuses on the United States government giving African-Americans their own homeland called New Colonia (comprising the former southern slave states of Alabama, Louisiana, and Mississippi) after the Civil War.

== Games ==
- Aces & Eights: Shattered Frontier role-playing game, written by Jolly R. Blackburn, Brian Jelke, Steve Johansson, Dave Kenzer, Jennifer Kenzer and Mark Plemmons, and published by Kenzer & Company June 20, 2007.
- Damnation by Blue Omega Entertainment and published by Codemasters. Released May 26, 2009.
- Deadlands role-playing game by Pinnacle Entertainment Group.
- Dixie (board wargame) by Simulations Publications Incorporated (SPI), the Union loses the Civil War but fights again with the Confederate States of America in the 1930s using tanks in addition to infantry. Appeared in Strategy & Tactics magazine, January 1976.
- Doomtown collectible card game by Alderac Entertainment Group, Wizards of the Coast, and Five Rings Publishing Group
- Deadlands: Doomtown Range Wars, a Disk Wars game by Fantasy Flight Games. Released in 2000.
- GURPS Alternate Earths (1996), a supplement of alternate realities published by Steve Jackson Games for the GURPS Third Edition, which includes the alternate world codenamed "Dixie", where the North American continent, circa 1985, is divided between the northern USA and the southern CSA along an extended Mason–Dixon line. An updated (current year: 1993) but truncated description of this world, now known as "Dixie-1", was included in the revised Fourth Edition version of the book (see history at GURPS Infinite Worlds#Dixie-1).
- Victoria II, a grand strategy wargame by Paradox Interactive, offers an opportunity for the Confederacy to win the American Civil War and become a world power. Released August 31, 2010.
- Gettysburg: Armored Warfare - A man from the year 2060 travels back in time to the Civil War, bringing weapons from his time that he gives to the Confederate forces in the hope of changing the future of America. Released March 27, 2012.
- Deo Vindice, an alternate history mod for Hearts of Iron 4 focusing on an independent CSA during World War II. It takes its name from the Confederate States' national motto.

== Comics ==
- Captain Confederacy (1986, and occasional tie-ins afterward) by Will Shetterly and Vince Stone.
- Elseworlds: Batman: The Blue, the Grey and the Bat (1992) by Elliot S! Maggin and Alan Weiss.
- Elseworlds: Superman: A Nation Divided (1999) by Roger Stern.
- Elseworlds: Batman: Detective No. 27 by Michael Uslan and Peter Snejbjerg. Published December 1, 2003.
- What If?: Captain America Volume 1, What If Captain America Fought in the Civil War? (2006) by Tony Bedard
- One issue of Supreme written by Alan Moore.
