= American Civil War alternate histories =

Genre of alternate histories

American Civil War alternate histories are alternate history fiction that focuses on the Civil War ending differently or not occurring. The American Civil War is a popular point of divergence in English-language alternate history fiction. The most common variants detail the victory and survival of the Confederate States. Less common variants include a Union victory under different circumstances from actual history, resulting in a different postwar situation; black American slaves freeing themselves by revolt without waiting for Lincoln's Emancipation Proclamation; a direct British and/or French intervention in the war; the survival of Lincoln during John Wilkes Booth's assassination attempt; a retelling of historical events with fantasy elements inserted; the Civil War never breaking out and a peaceful compromise being reached; and secret history tales. The point of divergence in such a story can be a "natural, realistic" event, such as one general making a different decision, or one sentry detecting an enemy invasion unlike in reality. It can also be an "unnatural" fantasy/science fiction plot device such as time travel, which usually takes the form of someone bringing modern weapons or hindsight knowledge into the past. Still another related variant is a scenario of a Civil War that breaks out at a different time from 1861 and under different circumstances (such as the North, rather than the South, seceding from the Union).

American Civil War alternate histories are one of the two most popular points of divergence to create an alternate history in the English language, the other being an Axis victory in World War II.

Depictions of the later development of a victorious Confederacy vary considerably from one another, especially on two major interrelated issues: the independent Confederacy's treatment of its black population and its relations with the rump United States in the North.

== Scenarios ==
- The South wins the Civil War, and slavery still exists as of the time of the story. Examples include the 2004 mockumentary C.S.A.: The Confederate States of America, where the United States is annexed by the Confederate States and slavery continues. In Ben Winters' Underground Airlines, slavery has remained legal in the "Hard Four" (Alabama, Louisiana, Mississippi and a unified Carolina) and slaves are controlled by electronic device implanted in their spines. Its name evokes the Underground Railroad in relations to its setting. The novel attracted praise for exploring racism through the alternate-history mechanism.
- In Hallie Marshall: A True Daughter of the South (1900) by Frank Williams, the earliest known Civil War alternate history, the Confederacy won by mobilizing black slaves to its army, their participation turning the tide at Gettysburg. Thirty years later, the independent Confederacy is full of happy, well-treated black slaves feeling perfectly content under the benevolent, paternalistic planters, comparing favorably with the rump United States, which is torn by a brutal class struggle, with nominally free factory workers protesting inhumane working conditions or starving in unemployment. In Gray Victory, set in the immediate aftermath of the war, the Confederacy is faced with both subversion by Northern Abolitionists and the increasing organization and assertiveness of Black Southerners, and the story gives the clear impression that no matter who wins, the end of slavery is inevitable.
- Slavery ends in the South in name only, or minorities are oppressed into low socio-economic parts of society, such as in The Guns of the South. Freeing the slaves is attributed to Robert E. Lee, who becomes the second Confederate President. It is logical to assume that his prestige would have run high and made him a plausible candidate to succeed Jefferson Davis, but the position he would have taken regarding slavery is the subject of some debate. However, ending slavery would not necessarily provide equality for Black Southerners, and Bring the Jubilee has blacks, despite Lee's grand gesture, remaining disenfranchised into the 20th century, as are people from Latin America, who are annexed by the Confederacy. The rump United States is completely broken down by its defeat and becomes an impoverished and backward country while the Confederacy goes on to annex everything to its south as far as Tierra del Fuego (except the Republic of Haiti) and become a major world power. In Harry Turtledove's Southern Victory series, it is President James Longstreet who abolished slavery as a prerequisite for retaining British and French support for the Confederacy in the Second Mexican War, but blacks remain an underclass that is very oppressed and discriminated against, denied basic civil rights, and are not even allowed to have surnames. In later volumes of the series, the blacks rise in a brutal armed revolt, called the Red Rebellion, during the Great War, which leads to a Holocaust-like genocide.
- A more optimistic result in The Guns of the South and several other works has both nations settle down and have reasonably good neighborly relations within a few years of the war's end and, in some cases, agree to reunite as one nation after 50 or 100 years of being apart. If the South Had Won the Civil War by MacKinlay Kantor has reunification come later: in the 20th century, the United States, the Confederate States and Texas, which seceded from the CS, become economically integrated and in both World Wars all fight against Germany as close allies. After the Second World War, all three feel threatened by Soviet missile bases and armored brigades in Alaska, which was never purchased from Russia. They announce formal reunification in 1961, on the precise centennial of Fort Sumter. Conversely, a GURPS game setting book presents a 1993 in which the US and the CS still watch each other warily across an armed border that stretches to the Pacific.
- In Southern Victory, the US and the CS develop into hereditary enemies that go to war again every decade or two, spend the rest of the time preparing for new war, and become entangled in webs of worldwide military alliances. Southern Victory has both drawn into the Great War. They open an American front of trench warfare that is every bit as terrible as the one in Europe, and a generation later go to war yet again with the Confederacy developing a murderous tyranny similar to Nazi Germany. Conversely, the 1914 of "A Hard Day for Mother", in Alternate Generals 1 by William R. Forstchen, sees an amicable treaty of reconciliation and voluntary reunification between the two nations.
- We Will Water Our Horses in The Mississippi: A.S. Johnson vs. U.S. Grant by James R. Arnold, Texan Confederate General Albert Sidney Johnston survived a fatal wound. This narrative is positioned within a broader series of alternative historical analyses, particularly those less recognized in the context of the Civil War, considering hypothetical scenario such as Confederate victories deciding the outcome of the western theater and strategic river fort.

== Literature ==
=== Novels ===
- 1862 by Robert Conroy. After the Trent Affair, the United Kingdom joins the Civil War on the side of the Confederacy.
- Abraham Lincoln, Vampire Hunter, by Seth Grahame-Smith, recasts the Civil War as a war on vampires that use slaves as a food source. The novel was later made into a film of the same name.
- "Beyond the Wildest Dreams of John Wilkes Booth" by Jay Winik, first printed in What Ifs? of American History, a scenario in which John Wilkes Booth assassinates not only Lincoln but also Andrew Johnson and William H. Seward.
- Bring the Jubilee by Ward Moore
- Britannia's Fist (trilogy) by Peter Tsouras. Britain and France enter the War in 1863 when British-built warships enter the Confederate Navy, instead of being seized by British forces before they could service, as really happened.
- Crosstime Traffic series by Harry Turtledove visits many alternate realities and briefly mentions a few in which the South won the Civil War. The fourth volume, The Disunited States of America, focuses on an alternate reality in which the adoption of the Articles of Confederation resulted in the dissolution of the United States by the 1800s. There were frequent small localized wars between states (such as Ohio versus Virginia, Massachusetts versus Rhode Island) but no single massive civil war.
- The Difference Engine by William Gibson and Bruce Sterling. In an alternate reality in which Charles Babbage successfully develops an analytical engine by 1824, Britain interferes in North American affairs to prevent the rise of the United States as a world power. By 1855, the Confederate States had seceded from the Union with other breakaway states including a Texan Republic, a Californian Republic and a Communist Manhattan Commune; there is also a Native American-dominated terra nullius in the Great Plains.
- Dirk Pitt series: Volume 11: Sahara by Clive Cussler. The series's recurring MacGuffin in which the heroes discover an astounding secret history, involves the Lincoln assassination in this one. It is a brief side plot that is only tenuously related to the main adventure and is completely left out of the film adaptation of the novel.
- Fire on the Mountain by Terry Bisson. Instead of a Civil War breaking out between North and South, there is a massive successful slave revolt in the Deep South, with blacks creating their own separate nation called "Nova Africa," which leads to Socialist revolutions in France, the United States, Ireland, and Russia.
- Gettysburg: An Alternate History by Peter Tsouras. A counterfactual account of an even more decisive Union victory at The Battle of Gettysburg
- Gettysburg: A Novel of the Civil War, Grant Comes East, and Never Call Retreat: Lee and Grant: The Final Victory by Newt Gingrich, William R. Forstchen, and Albert S. Hanser - the South wins the Battle of Gettysburg as in the classic Bring the Jubilee, but General Ulysses Grant manages to snatch victory from the jaws of defeat, and the North wins the war even quicker than in actual history.
- Gray Victory by Robert Skimin
- The Guns of the South by Harry Turtledove. Members of the Afrikaner Weerstandsbeweging travel back in time from 2014 South Africa to the Confederacy in 1864. They supply Lee's Army of Northern Virginia with AK-47s and small amounts of other technologies, resulting in a Confederate victory.
- The Impeachment of Abraham Lincoln by Stephen L. Carter. Lincoln survives his assassination at Ford's Theatre in 1865 but is impeached by Congress.
- "Lee at the Alamo" by Harry Turtledove. A story published online at here.
- The Lost Regiment series by William R. Forstchen. A Union Army regiment is transported into an alien world, that faces off against aliens such as the Tugar and the Bantag.
- A Rebel in Time by Harry Harrison. A racist army officer goes back in time to bring about a Confederate victory.
- Russian Amerika by Stoney Compton. The backstory is only vaguely defined, but the point of divergence seems to be a Confederate victory in the 1860s.
- The Mechanical War by N.G. Mays, The setting re-imagines the American Civil War with advanced mechanical weapons and aerial reconnaissance, showing a conflict changed by fast industrial innovation.
- Shattered Nation: An Alternate History of the American Civil War (trilogy) by Jeffrey Evan Brooks. The series focuses on the Confederacy winning its independence in 1864 by achieving victory at the Battle of Atlanta, thanks to a telegram that keeps Joseph E. Johnston as general of the Army of Tennessee.
- The Shiloh Project by David Poyer
- The Shores of Tomorrow by David Mason diverges from our history long before 1861. Developments in the late 18th Century lead to a technologically backward US becoming totally and permanently dominated by the slave-holding South, a situation lasting until the 1940s, when a series of Northern rebellions breaks out - a major rebel leader being Admiral Franklin Roosevelt, who was killed in the Battle of Long Island Sound. His sacrifice was not in vain, eventually the Northern secessionists win and establish three Free Republics, leaving the slave-holders with only a narrow strip of Mexican Gulf shore.
- The Southern Victory Series, by Harry Turtledove. Special Order 191 is kept out of Union hands in September 1862, and the South wins independence in October. Over the next 80 years, the Union and Confederacy have numerous devastating grudge matches.
- The Stars and Stripes trilogy (Stars and Stripes Forever [1998], Stars and Stripes In Peril [2000], and Stars and Stripes Triumphant [2002]) by Harry Harrison. The Trent affair and the premature death of Prince Albert, the husband of Queen Victoria, elicit a war between the Union and Britain, eventually seeing America reunited under one government.
- TimeRiders: volume 4: The Eternal War (2011) by Alex Scarrow. Britain enters the American Civil War on the side of the Confederacy, turning the war into an unending stalemate.
- In Underground Airlines, by Ben H. Winters (2016). President-elect Lincoln is assassinated in 1861, and a version of the Crittenden Compromise is adopted preventing the Civil War from occurring. Slavery thus continues in four southern states (the "Hard Four" comprising Alabama, Louisiana, Mississippi, and a united Carolina) to the present. The title refers to the secret network assisting escaping slaves, updated from the Underground Railroad. The protagonist is a black US Marshal who is forced to work tracking down runaway slaves.
- War Between the Provinces series by Harry Turtledove. This fantasy allegory of the Civil War is set in imaginary countries with recognizable analogous characters, such as King Avram, General Bart, and General Hesmucet.

=== Short stories ===
- "All the Myriad Ways" by Larry Niven, with worlds of a CS victory being mentioned only briefly by the narrator in a list of alternate realities known in the story.
- Alternate Generals, volume 1, contains three US Civil War-related stories:
  - "The Charge of Lee's Brigade" by S.M. Stirling. The American Revolution never happened and so Virginia and most of North America remain under British rule. In the mid-19th century, Brigadier General Sir Robert E. Lee and his lieutenants, including Jeb Stuart, fight against the Russians in an analogous Crimean War.
  - "An Old Man's Summer" by Esther Friesner. In the mid-20th century, Dwight Eisenhower time travels to witness the Battle of Gettysburg.
  - "A Hard Day for Mother" by William R. Forstchen. A look at what might have happened at Little Round Top if Joshua Chamberlain had fought for the Confederacy, rather than the Union.
- Alternate Presidents contains four stories with wildly different hypothetical Civil War scenarios:
  - "Chickasaw Slave" by Judith Moffett in which Davy Crockett is elected President of the United States in 1828 after Andrew Jackson's reputation is tarnished by a land-dealing scandal. The Compromise of 1850 leads to an early Civil War and a Confederate victory three years later.
  - "How the South Preserved the Union" by Ralph Roberts. It focuses on the Northeast seceding from the Union as the "New England Confederacy" after David Rice Atchison ascends to the presidency following President Zachary Taylor and Vice President Millard Fillmore's deaths in a carriage accident shortly into their terms. A Southern-dominated United States fights the New Englanders for two years resulting in a Union victory, with the New England states readmitted and President Stephen A. Douglas passing the Civil Rights Act of 1861, which abolishes slavery and grants freedmen the right to vote.
  - "Now Falls the Cold, Cold Night" by Jack L. Chalker focuses on a scenario in which former President Millard Fillmore on the Know Nothing Party is elected the 15th President in 1856 after James Buchanan suffers a stroke in October. Fillmore upholds the fugitive slave laws in 1858, which results in ethnic tensions and riots in New England and causes it to secede from the Union. John C. Frémont becomes President of the New England Confederacy with William Tecumseh Sherman as his commanding general, opposed by the Army of the United States under Robert E. Lee.
  - "Lincoln's Charge" by Bill Fawcett focuses on Douglas becoming President of the United States. The South still secedes, and Lincoln commands a division against the Rebels.
- "Custer's Last Jump" by Steven Utley and Howard Waldrop (1976), reprinted in numerous anthologies. Aerial warfare is more advanced in the 1860s than it was in our world.
- "The Diamond as Big as the Ritz" by F. Scott Fitzgerald's story depicts a dynasty of Virginian landowners as they hole up in a distant mountain valley, keeping hundreds of Black slaves in perpetual bondage, concealing from them that slavery was abolished and telling them that Nathan Bedford Forrest had at last moment rallied the Confederate armies and achieved victory. Thus, Fitzgerald's story in effect posits a secret enclave of a victorious Confederacy persisting into the actual United States of the 1920's.
- Dixie Victorious: An Alternate History of the Civil War by Peter G. Tsouras. The anthology of various Civil War/Confederate victory has ten alternate history scenarios, written by various authors.
  - "Hell on Earth" by Andrew Uffindell focuses on an Anglo-French intervention on the side of the Confederates against the Union after Albert of Saxe-Coburg dies in a carriage incident before he could handle the Trent Affair. It worsens with the wounding of Thomas Fairfax and the death of two British citizens as well as a successful St. Albans Raid in 1861 and a harsh ultimatum to the Lincoln administration.
  - "Ships of Iron and Wills of Steel" by Wade G. Dudley focuses on a Union victory at the Battle of Hampton Roads and a Confederate counterblockade with resources properly-allocated to the Confederate Navy.
  - "What Will Our Country Say?" by David Keithly focuses on Lee not losing the famous Lost Orders during the Maryland Campaign.
  - "When the Bottom Fell Out" by Michael Hathaway focuses on a financial crisis and collapse of the Union economy in 1862, coupled with a Southern victory in Maryland.
  - "We Will Water Our Horses in the Mississippi" by James R. Arnold focuses on Albert Sidney Johnston surviving his wound at the Battle of Shiloh thanks to a tourniquet applied to him and going on to face Ulysses S. Grant in the Vicksburg Campaign.
  - "Absolutely Essential to Victory" by Edward G. Longcare focuses on JEB Stuart's cavalry not riding around the Army of the Potomac and staying with Robert E. Lee's Army of Northern Virginia.
  - "Moves to Great Advantage" by John D. Burrett focuses on Braxton Bragg fired from the Army of Tennessee and replaced by James Longstreet after the Battle of Chickamauga.
  - "Confederate Black and Grey" by Peter G. Tsouras focuses on the Confederacy accepting Patrick Cleburne's proposal to use black slaves and to free blacks in the Confederate Army as soldiers.
  - "Decision in the West" by Cyril M. Lagvanec focuses on the Trans-Mississippi Theater of the Civil War for the Confederacy in which there is a different depth of a sandbar, coupled with the disastrous Red River Campaign.
  - "Terrible as an Army with Banners" by Kevin F. Kelley focuses on Jubal Early succeeding in his raid on Washington, D.C., as a result of the United States Marine Corps loosening on him, which allows him to break the Siege of Petersburg.
- "East of Appomattox" (in Alternate Generals III) by Lee Allred. In 1868, the CSA sends Ambassador Robert E. Lee to London to assure continued British recognition, and he finds unexpected challenges and even more unlikely allies.
- "Hush My Mouth" by Suzette Haden Elgin, first printed in Alternative Histories: 11 Stories of the World as It Might Have Been (1986).
- "If Grant Had Been Drinking at Appomattox" by James Thurber. Inspired by the above book, the wrong man surrenders.
- If It Had Happened Otherwise (1931) anthology contains two relevant entries: "If Lee Had NOT Won the Battle of Gettysburg" by Winston Churchill, and "If Booth had Missed Lincoln" by Milton Waldman.
- "If the Lost Order Hadn't Been Lost: Robert E. Lee Humbles the Union, 1862" by James M. McPherson, first printed in What If? and reprinted in What Ifs? of American History, a scenario posited by McPherson that focuses on the Lost Order staying in Confederate hands, allowing the South to advance to Pennsylvania and to win an alternate version of the Battle of Gettysburg, resulting in the death of George B. McClellan and Braxton Bragg and Edmund Kirby Smith winning and taking over Kentucky during the Heartland Campaign. The decisive victory allows the Copperheads to win the 1862 legislative elections, coupled with Britain and France recognizing the new nation. Lincoln and his cabinet are thus forced to issue a proclamation to recognize the Confederacy as a sovereign, separate nation by New Year's Eve 1863.
- "If President James Buchanan Had Enforced the Law," by Joseph Edgar Chamberlin depicts President Buchanan as he fully enforced federal law upon South Carolina's succession stopping the civil war.
- "If the South Had Been Allowed to Go" by Ernest Crosby. Another early Civil War alternate history written in 1903.
- If the South Had Won the Civil War by MacKinlay Kantor, originally published in Look Magazine in 1960 and published as a book in 1961. Ulysses S. Grant is killed in an accident in May 1863, while Robert E. Lee is more competent at Gettysburg in July.
- "The Lincoln Train" by Maureen F. McHugh in Nebula Awards anthologies Volume 31, Alternate Tyrants, and Best of the Best: 20 Years of the Year's Best Science Fiction - Lincoln survives the assassination attempt but is brain-damaged, and Secretary of War Edwin Stanton seizes the position of de facto acting President.
- "Must and Shall" (collected in the anthology Counting Up, Counting Down, also in Volume 32 of the Nebula Awards series) by Harry Turtledove
- "New Washington" by Jerry Pournelle depicts American-descended space colonists in the far future as they in effect re-enact the Civil War - only this time around, it is the planet New Washington, settled by Americans from the North, which rebels and tries to get free of the Franklin Confederacy, based on the planet Franklin which was settled by Southerners.
- A Rebel in Time by Harry Harrison
- "Sidewise in Time" by Murray Leinster. Confederate victory is one of several alternate realities briefly visited in the story.
- The Wild Blue and the Gray by William Sanders. The Civil War alternate history is set during World War I in which the Confederate States joins the Allies.

== Film and television ==
- Abraham Lincoln: Vampire Hunter, a 2012 film directed by Timur Bekmambetov and written by Seth Grahame-Smith, based on the book of the same name.
- Abraham Lincoln vs. Zombies, a 2012 American direct-to-video action comedy horror B movie directed by Richard Schenkman.
- Confederate, a planned but canceled HBO television series; announced in 2017, it was confirmed as cancelled in 2020 after considerable online controversy.
- C.S.A.: The Confederate States of America, a mockumentary directed by Kevin Willmott.
- The Legend of Zorro, a sequel to The Mask of Zorro. The original is not Civil War-related.
- The Time Tunnel, episodes 12 ("The Death Trap") and 25 ("The Death Merchant")
- The Wild Wild West, episode "The Night of the Lord of Limbo"
- Bass X Machina, animated TV series created by LeSean Thomas.

== Games ==
- Aces & Eights: Shattered Frontier role-playing game, written by Jolly R. Blackburn, Brian Jelke, Steve Johansson, Dave Kenzer, Jennifer Kenzer and Mark Plemmons, and published by Kenzer & Company in 2007.
- Damnation by Blue Omega Entertainment and published by Codemasters.
- Deadlands role-playing game by Pinnacle Entertainment Group
- Dixie hex and counter board game by Simulations Publications Incorporated (SPI), the Union loses the Civil War and is trying to reclaim the Confederate States of America in the 1930s.
- Doomtown collectible card game by Alderac Entertainment Group, Wizards of the Coast, and Five Rings Publishing Group
- Doomtown: Range Wars, a Disk Wars game by Fantasy Flight Games
- GURPS Alternate Earths (1996), a supplement of alternate realities published by Steve Jackson Games for the GURPS Third Edition, which includes the alternate world codenamed "Dixie" in which the North American continent circa 1985 is divided between the northern US and the southern CS along an extended Mason–Dixon line. An updated (current year: 1993) but truncated description of this world, now known as "Dixie-1", was included in the revised Fourth Edition version of the book (see history at GURPS Infinite Worlds#Dixie-1).
- Victoria II, a grand strategy wargame by Paradox Interactive, offers an opportunity for the Confederacy to win the American Civil War and become a world power. It is also possible for a northern Free States of America, instead of the Confederates, to break away.

== Comics ==
- The Amazing Screw-On Head (2002) by Mike Mignola
- Captain Confederacy (1986 and occasional tie-ins afterward) by Will Shetterly and Vince Stone.
- Elseworlds: Batman: The Blue, the Grey and the Bat (1992) by Elliot S! Maggin and Alan Weiss.
- Elseworlds: Superman: A Nation Divided (1998) by Roger Stern
- Elseworlds: Batman: Detective No. 27 (2003) by Michael Uslan and Peter Snejbjerg
- Supreme written by Alan Moore features one issue with alternate history of the American Civil War.
- What If?: Captain America Volume 1, What If Captain America Fought in the Civil War? (2006) by Tony Bedard

== See also ==
- Hypothetical Axis victory in World War II, a similar plot device regarding an alternate outcome of World War II
- List of alternate histories diverging at the American Civil War
- Second American Civil War in speculative fiction
