= Second American Civil War in speculative fiction =

Fictional/Hypothetical war scenario

The idea of a second American Civil War is commonly used in speculative fiction. The science fiction author Paul Di Filippo has coined the term "America Disunited" to describe a subgenre of speculative fiction where the United States is balkanized or facing civil war, arguing that the subgenre goes back to the 19th century. There has also been recent academic research into second civil war fiction. Others have argued the increase in novels on a second American civil war demonstrate increasing polarization in the United States since Donald Trump's first election.

== Academic research ==
Some scholars have argued that many second civil war fictional novels were written to inspire far-right radicalization and violence, such as The Turner Diaries. However, novels such as alternative history The Guns of the South or future dystopian fiction series such as The Hunger Games and Divergent do not attempt to do this.

== List of second civil war fictional works ==
Fictional political factions in Civil War (2024). The factions are intended to be vague. Loyalist States (United States government) Western Forces Florida Alliance New People's Army

Examples of second American civil war speculative fiction, based on academic or other cited works include:

Title	Author(s) / creator(s)	Year	Type	Scenario	Source
The Iron Heel	Jack London	1908	Novel	U.S. dictatorship and rebellion	
It Can't Happen Here	Sinclair Lewis	1935	Novel	U.S. dictatorship and resistance	
"If This Goes On—"	Robert A. Heinlein	1940	Novella	U.S. dictatorship and rebellion	
Earth Abides	George R. Stewart	1949	Novel	Collapse of U.S./North American civilization	
The Long Tomorrow	Leigh Brackett	1955	Novel	Collapse and fragmentation of the United States	
Seven Days in May	Fletcher Knebel and Charles W. Bailey II	1962	Novel	Attempted U.S. military dictatorship	
Davy	Edgar Pangborn	1964	Novel	Post-collapse North America under authoritarian rule	
Stand on Zanzibar	John Brunner	1968	Novel	U.S. social and political breakdown	
The Jagged Orbit	John Brunner	1969	Novel	U.S. social fragmentation and widespread political violence	
The Sheep Look Up	John Brunner	1972	Novel	U.S. social, environmental, and political collapse	
Ecotopia	Ernest Callenbach	1975	Novel	Secession of the Pacific Northwest from the United States	
The Turner Diaries	Andrew Macdonald	1978	Novel	U.S. insurgency and civil war	
On Wings of Song	Thomas M. Disch	1979	Novel	Fragmented and authoritarian United States	
Hello America	J. G. Ballard	1981	Novel	Collapse and abandonment of the United States	
Friday	Robert A. Heinlein	1982	Novel	Political fragmentation of North America	
Radio Free Albemuth	Philip K. Dick	1985	Novel	U.S. dictatorship and resistance	
The Guns of the South	Harry Turtledove	1992	Novel	Major U.S. rebellion/civil war	
Snow Crash	Neal Stephenson	1992	Novel	Collapse and political fragmentation of the United States	
DMZ	Brian Wood and Riccardo Burchielli	2005	Comic-book series	Second American Civil War	
The Hunger Games	Suzanne Collins	2008	Novel	Post-collapse North American dictatorship and rebellion	
Divergent	Veronica Roth	2011	Novel	Post-collapse North American authoritarian society and rebellion	
Tropic of Kansas	Christopher Brown	2017	Novel	U.S. political collapse, authoritarian repression, and rebellion	
American War	Omar El Akkad	2017	Novel	Second American Civil War and national collapse	
The Handmaid's Tale	Bruce Miller	2017–2025	Television series	Authoritarian regime replacing the United States	
Biography of X	Catherine Lacey	2023	Novel	Alternate United States divided following political upheaval	
Civil War	Alex Garland	2024	Film	Second American Civil War and collapse of federal authority	
The Breakup	Kurt Andersen	2026	Novel	Dissolution of the United States and limited civil war	
Exit Party	Emily St. John Mandel	2026	Novel	U.S. coup, civil war, and national fragmentation	

Other works in the category for Second American Civil War speculative fiction include:

Name	Year(s) Released	Media
1900: Or, The Last President	1896	Novel
After the Revolution	2022	Novel
Back in the USSA	1997	Novel
"Back to the Pilot"	2011	TV episode
Barb Wire (1996 film)	1996	Film
Bring the Jubilee	1953	Novel
DMZ	2022	TV miniseries
Eddington (film)	2025	Film
The Electric State	2023	Graphic novel
Empire (Card novel)	2006	Novel
Flow My Tears, the Policeman Said	1974	Novel
First Citizen (novel)	1987	Novel
The Handmaid's Tale (TV series)	2017–2025	TV series
How Few Remain	1997	Novel
Jericho (2006 TV series)	2006	TV series
The Fire Rises (video game)	2024	Video game mod
The John Franklin Letters	1959	Novel
Kaiserreich (video game)	2016	Video game mod
Leave the World Behind (film)	2023	Film
Minuteman: The Second American Revolution	1976	Board wargame
The Passion of New Eve	1977	Novel
The Second Civil War	1997	TV film
Shattered Union	2005	Video game
Silicon Embrace	1996	Novel
Superman: Red Son	2003	Comic
Unwind (novel)	2007	Novel

== See also ==
- American Civil War alternate histories
- Hypothetical Axis victory in World War II
