= Gray Victory =

1988 novel by Robert Skimin

- Author: Robert Skimin
- Language: English
- Genre: Alternate history
- Publisher: St. Martin's Press
- Publication date: February 1988
- Publication place: United States
- Media type: Print (hardcover and paperback)
- Pages: 378
- ISBN: 0-312-01374-4
- OCLC: 16871347
- Dewey Decimal: 813/.54 19
- LC Class: PS3569.K49 G7 1988

Gray Victory is a 1988 alternate history novel by Robert Skimin, taking place in an alternate 1866 where the Confederacy won its independence.

== Plot introduction ==
The first point of divergence occurs during the American Civil War in May 1864, when General J. E. B. Stuart survives the wound which historically killed him at the Battle of Yellow Tavern. Then, in July, a second point of divergence occurs when Confederate President Jefferson Davis does not replace the "plodding" General Joseph E. Johnston, in command at Atlanta, with the "dashing" General John Bell Hood, as he actually did. Johnston, rather than leave the fortifications of Atlanta and get his army destroyed by William T. Sherman's Union forces, as Hood did in our time line, keeps his soldiers inside, fighting a long-drawn siege war of attrition until the Northern elections of November 1864. Abraham Lincoln loses the support of the war-weary voters and Democratic candidate and Major general George B. McClellan is elected president. McClellan orders a cease-fire, followed by a peace in which the independence of the South is recognized.

== Plot summary ==
Despite the South's victory, the population is still coming to terms with the enormous costs of the war. Edward A. Pollard, the editor of the Richmond Examiner is one of them; he blames J. E. B. Stuart for having caused the Confederate defeat at the Battle of Gettysburg, which lengthened the war by one year and cost so many more lives in intervening battles. Seeking reelection in 1867 (as his 6-year-term ends on February 22, 1868), Jefferson Davis convenes a court of inquiry to provide a public airing of the accusation. Though Stuart welcomes the inquiry as an opportunity to clear his name, Davis intends to make Stuart the scapegoat for the defeat.

(Note that the reelection business is a bit odd, as the Constitution of the Confederate States limited the President to a single term. It must be assumed that the Constitution had an amendment in the alternate 1865.)

To represent him in the tribunal, Stuart approaches his good friend Colonel John S. Mosby. Now the head of military intelligence, Mosby accepts, juggling preparations for the inquiry with his other duties. His primary concern is "Abraham," an organization of southern African Americans pursuing an end to slavery in the South. Enjoying a cordial relationship with the movement's leader, a local businessman and preacher named Jublio, he nonetheless recruits an informant to monitor Jublio's activities.

Yet Abraham is not the Confederacy's greatest problem. A band of northern abolitionists and freedmen, bitter at the way the war ended and southern slavery continued, form a terrorist cell known as "Amistad", named for the famous slave ship. Organized by Thomas Wentworth Higginson, they plot to infiltrate the Confederate capital of Richmond and stage an incident which will rally the slaves and restart the war. Though the cell is made up of African Americans, the leader is Salmon Brown, the surviving son of John Brown, who is consumed with guilt at having backed out of his family's raid on Harpers Ferry and determined to redeem himself. Brown is unsettled, though, by the addition of an octoroon woman named Verita to the cell, while the group's plans are jeopardized by a vainglorious member code-named Crispus Attucks who writes compromising letters to the authorities in Washington taunting them about the cell's upcoming actions. Not wanting to jeopardize relations with the Confederacy, President McClellan orders General John Rawlins to investigate the letters. Former President Lincoln, still regarded as a hero by many, also sponsors Rawlins' mission.

The court of inquiry attracts considerable attention from the public and the press. Many prominent women rally around the handsome Stuart, most notably Bessica Adams Southwick, a beautiful and wealthy widow. Her casual flirtation with Stuart soon develops into love, though Stuart's sense of honor restrains him from betraying his marital vows. Intrigued by the opportunity presented by the trial, Higginson arranges for Verita to travel to Richmond. Posing as a French actress, she is hosted by Southwick, who soon gives Verita access to many prominent Confederate figures, most notably Judah P. Benjamin, with whom Higginson encourages Verita to begin an affair so as to learn what the Confederate official knows about funding for underground activities. Higginson also orders the remainder of the group to Richmond in preparation for their attack.

When the inquiry begins, Mosby quickly becomes aware of the hostility of the members of the court — Braxton Bragg, George Pickett, and John Bell Hood — towards Stuart. Nonetheless, he mounts a vigorous defense of his friend. A greater challenge for him is the growing romantic interest of Spring Blakely, the niece of Confederate States Secretary of War John C. Breckinridge and a secret abolitionist. While attracted to Blakeley, Mosby holds back, still grieving for his recently deceased wife. He also attempts to deal with the threat posed by Amistad. Alerted to the possibility of a plot by Rawlins, the two pursue their investigations in consultation with one another.

As the inquiry continues, Amistad prepares to carry out their plan to attack the dignitaries assembled in the courtroom. Approaching Jublio, they attempt to utilize his Abraham branch in their plans, but he keeps a wary distance from the plotters. Brown also attempts to deal with his growing jealousy over Verita's affair with Benjamin, and when confronted by her he admits his love. Distracted, he is unaware of Crispus's growing instability, which threatens to expose the group. Nevertheless, it is Crispus who identifies Mosby's informer, a man named Israel Jones among the Abraham organization. He kills Jones, but not before Jones succeeds in sending to Mosby a garbled name "Saman Brown" which Mosby eventually figures out is that of Salmon Brown. T.W. Higginson, having been informed by Jubilo that Brown and Crispus' plans have turned to madness, tells Brown to cease and desist but is murdered by Brown.

Mosby enjoys a great breakthrough in Stuart's case. After careful study of the records, he decides to shift the blame for the defeat to James Longstreet, who long sought Stuart's court-martial for his actions during the battle. With Davis's plans in ruins and the members of the court preparing to clear Stuart of all blame, the Confederate president suffers an additional blow when Robert E. Lee himself agrees to testify. Lee's appearance catalyzes the Amistad plotters. On August 14, 1866, while Lee testifies in the courthouse, the plotters dynamite the Confederate White House, the destruction of which draws away many of the guards stationed at the courthouse in anticipation of an attack on the inquiry. With the courtroom weakly defended, the Amistad plotters rush the room, and gloatingly hold the famous Confederates hostage. Finally, a firefight erupts in which most of the Amistad group die, but they succeed in killing a number of people, including Benjamin, P. G. T. Beauregard, and Stuart, who takes a bullet for Lee - and also Rawlins of the USA. A decisive factor in the battle is the sudden appearance of the armed Jubilo, who decided to turn against the Amistad group and who kills Salmon Brown (who in real life lived until 1919, when he committed suicide in Portland, Oregon).

With Lee surviving, a US officer among those killed by the Amistad group, and Jubilo having turned informer, the incident fails to reignite the war between the US and CSA which the conspirators hoped for. However, there is much rioting and bloodshed inside the Confederacy's own territory, with angry mobs attacking random Blacks and the Black activists of "Abraham" succeeding to fight back in some locations. A meeting between Mosby and Jubilo in the aftermath gives the impression that the Confederate government will have to change its attitude to the Black population - not only eventually abolish slavery but also grant civil rights to the increasingly organized and self-aware Blacks.

In October, Verita - the only one of the Amistad group to survive the fighting - has been sentenced to death by a military tribunal, analogous to the case of Mary Surratt in our timeline. She haughtily rebuffs Mosby's suggestion that she ask for clemency, telling him "I will be alive when you are dust" and prepares to die as a martyr and create a heroic myth for future radicals.

The novel ends as both nations are massing troops together, and it is suggested that a second war may be inevitable unless changes are made. In the final page, Mosby visits Stuart's grave and loses himself in memories of his first sight of the great Cavalier.

== Literary criticism and reception ==
A review in the Virginia Quarterly Review said of the novel "Skimin crafts his characters and their setting with such care that one cannot help but enjoy the ruse—and marvel at the story's finale. A history lover's delicacy."

== References in other works ==
Authors Paul Ashdown and Edward Caudill have mentioned the novel in their two novels The Mosby Myth and The Myth of Nathan Bedford Forrest. John S. Mosby is mentioned in the novel as the chief of the military intelligence in the regular Confederate States Army, with the specific duty of monitoring Abraham.

== See also ==
- American Civil War alternate histories
