= Stars and Stripes trilogy =

Alternative history novel set about the American Civil War

The Stars and Stripes trilogy is a collection of three alternate history novels written by Harry Harrison.

== Setting ==
All three novels involve the point of divergence of British involvement in the American Civil War after the Trent Affair. This happens when Prince Albert dies prematurely rather than playing his historic role in resolving the crisis. Queen Victoria blames the U.S. for his death. She authorizes her ministers to do anything necessary to ensure that the U.S. pays for it.

While 1861 is the relevant point of departure, there is another unexplained difference—the Duke of Wellington is still alive in 1862, though he remarks he has been "living on borrowed time" since his illness in 1852 (his death date in our world). This seems to date the initial point of divergence to 1852, without the butterfly effect changing intermediate occurrences, such as the course of the Crimean War.

== Novels ==
- Stars and Stripes Forever (1998)
- Stars and Stripes in Peril (2000)
- Stars and Stripes Triumphant (2002)

== See also ==
- American Civil War alternate histories
