= Confederate (TV series) =

Canceled HBO TV series

Confederate was a planned, but never made, American alternate history drama television series developed for the network HBO by David Benioff and D. B. Weiss, who had previously developed the HBO series Game of Thrones. The series was to be set in a timeline where the American Civil War ended in a stalemate.

The announcement of Confederate was followed by anger and criticism on social media with some describing it as slavery fan fiction. This led to the hashtag #NoConfederate, which trended number one in the United States and number two worldwide on Twitter in mid 2017. Although development of the series continued after the controversy, plans for the series were ultimately confirmed as canceled in January 2020.

== Premise ==
Entertainment Weekly reported that Confederate:

chronicles the events leading to the Third American Civil War. The series takes place in an alternate timeline, where the southern states have successfully seceded from the Union, giving rise to a nation in which slavery remains legal and has evolved into a modern institution. The story follows a broad swath of characters on both sides of the Mason-Dixon Demilitarized Zone – freedom fighters, slave hunters, politicians, abolitionists, journalists, the executives of a slave-holding conglomerate and the families of people in their thrall.

Show developer David Benioff said he was inspired to explore this concept by "the famous story of when Robert E. Lee was invading the North. Not the Gettysburg invasion, but an earlier one. And the set of orders got misplaced and were found by a Northern soldier. And it ended up ruining Lee's invasion. A lot of people think if the orders hadn't been lost, things might have been different: the Confederates might've sacked Washington, D.C., it's possible the South could've won the war". Co-creator D. B. Weiss added "it goes without saying slavery is the worst thing that ever happened in American history. It's our original sin as a nation. And history doesn't disappear. That sin is still with us in many ways. Confederate, in all of our minds, will be an alternative-history show."

== Production ==
=== Conception and development ===
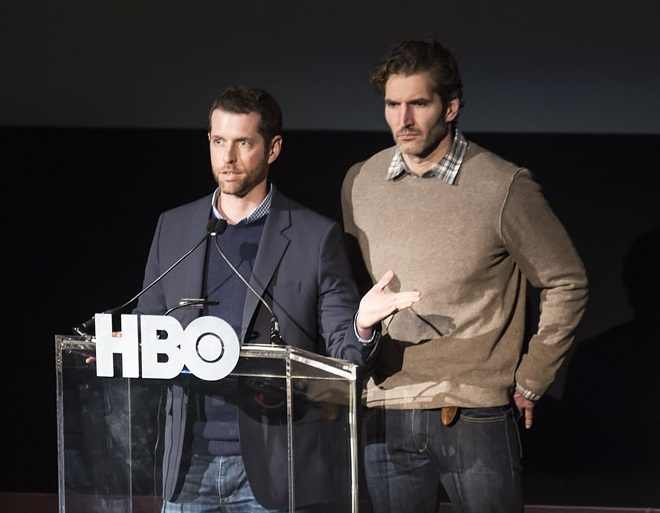
D. B. Weiss and David Benioff are the creators of the series.

On July 19, 2017, David Benioff announced that he and D. B. Weiss would begin production on a new HBO series, titled Confederate, after the final season of Game of Thrones aired in 2019. Benioff and Weiss said, "We have discussed Confederate for years, originally as a concept for a feature film... But our experience on Thrones has convinced us that no one provides a bigger, better storytelling canvas than HBO." Joining as executive producers would be Nichelle Tramble Spellman, Malcolm Spellman, Carolyn Strauss, and Bernadette Caulfield. The series would be written by Benioff, Weiss, Nichelle Tramble Spellman, and Malcolm Spellman. The Spellmans, who are Black, indicated initial hesitance to work on this project before concluding that the show would benefit from having Black writers. Malcolm Spellman stated "Me and Nichelle are not props being used to protect someone else", adding there would be "no whips and no plantations" in this show.

On February 6, 2018 Lucasfilm announced Benioff and Weiss as the writers and producers of a series of new Star Wars films, to begin production "as soon as the final season of Game of Thrones is complete", casting doubt on if and when Confederate would be produced. In April 2018, Variety reported the future of Confederate is uncertain. In July, HBO president Casey Bloys confirmed the series was still in development, and hoped it would resume once Benioff and Weiss finished their ongoing commitments, but stated in May 2019 that it was "not on the front burner".

=== Reactions ===
Upon announcement, Confederate received backlash on Twitter over its featuring a modern-day Confederate States in which slavery is legal. April Reign, who created the protest hashtag #OscarsSoWhite, created the hashtag #NoConfederate, which became the number one trending topic during the airing of an episode of Game of Thrones. Jake Nevins of The Guardian was concerned the show would act as wish fulfillment for white supremacists. He also cited the lack of diversity on Game of Thrones as a foundation for their concerns. Reign questioned the intent of the show, asking: "Who is the intended audience? It can't possibly be black people, right? Because then what you're saying is, 'Hey, black people, we know slavery is bad, but we want to show you how bad it was'."

The Guardian reported that the announcement of the show led to "widespread anger on social media". MSNBC host Joy Reid commented on the show, saying: "It plays to a rather concrete American fantasy: slavery that never ends, becoming a permanent state for black people. Repugnant." Ta-Nehisi Coates, writing for The Atlantic, said "African-Americans do not need science-fiction, or really any fiction, to tell them that this 'history is still with us'", and criticized its lack of originality because "'What if the white South had won?' may well be the most trod-upon terrain in the field of American alternative history." Author and activist Roxane Gay described Confederate as "slavery fan fiction", adding "if it's not being made for people of color, then that means this is made for white folk. Why, as a white person, would you want to see that unless it appeals to your base desire to see people enslaved and in pain?"

Weiss and Benioff with executive producers Nichelle Tramble Spellman and Malcolm Spellman defended the show in an interview with Vulture.com in which they asked critics to defer judgment until the show aired. At the Television Critics Association press tour, Casey Bloys acknowledged that the announcement of the show was poorly executed, but stood behind the decision to green-light the show.

After the Unite the Right rally in Charlottesville, Virginia, on August 12, 2017, KJ Whittaker worried that Confederate could intensify hate groups in America. HBO representatives responded to these concerns on August 15 with a statement to The New York Times:

"HBO has a long history of championing intelligent storytelling and we will approach this project with the same level of thoughtfulness that has always defined our programming. We recognize the sensitivity of this project and will treat it with the respect that it deserves. Our creative partners should be given time to develop the series rather than face prejudgment."

In February 2019, Bloys said the series was still in development and not affected by the controversy. However, in August 2019, it was announced that Benioff and Weiss had closed a multi-million dollar deal with Netflix, and it was reported that the deal "wipes Confederate off HBO's books." In January 2020, Bloys confirmed that the project had been officially canceled.

== See also ==
- American Civil War alternate histories
- The Secret Diary of Desmond Pfeiffer
- C.S.A.: The Confederate States of America
