= Bring the Jubilee =

1953 book by Ward Moore

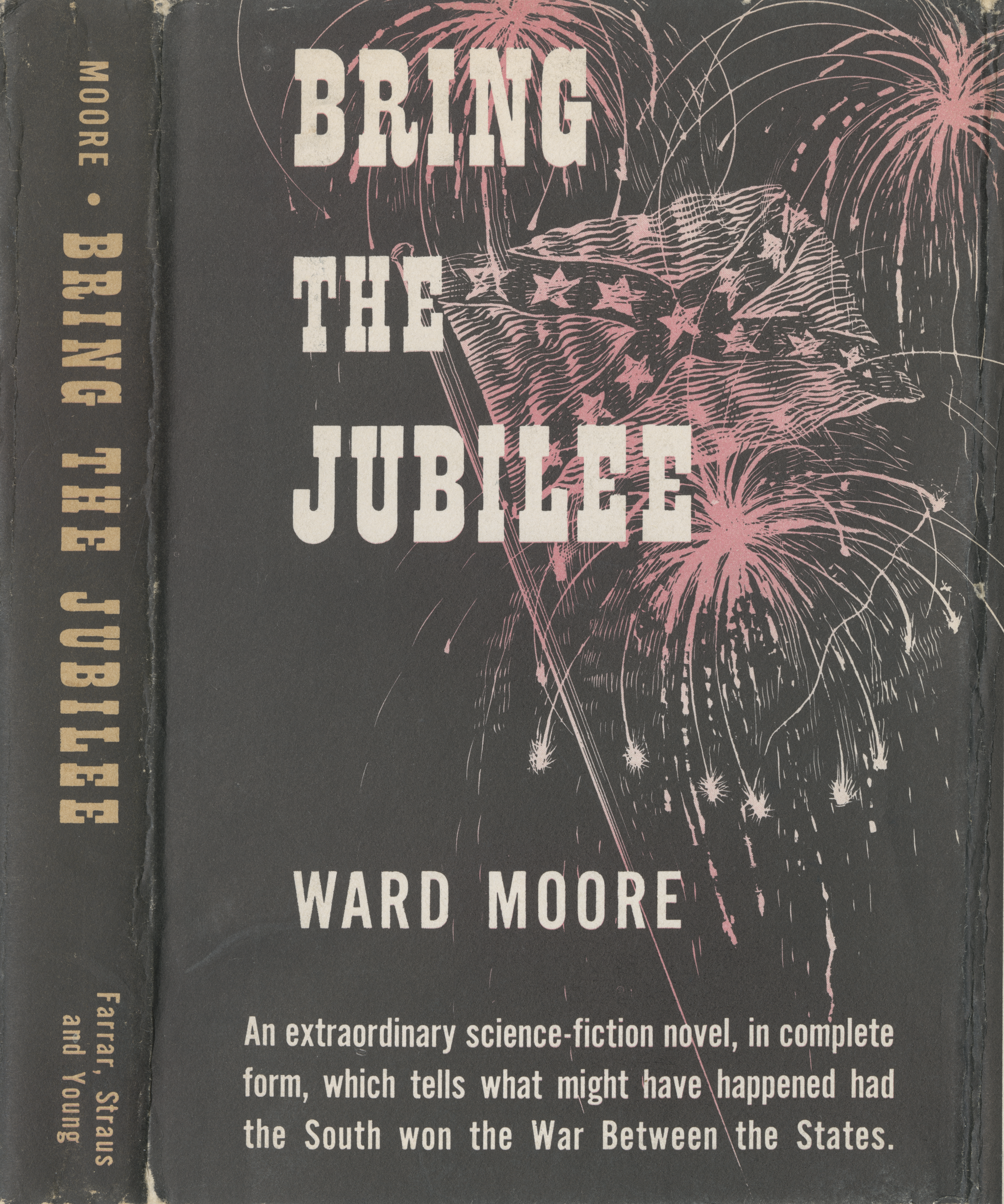
- Cover of the 1953 Farrar, Straus & Young edition
- Author: Ward Moore
- Language: English
- Genre: Alternate history
- Publisher: Ballantine Books
- Publication date: September 21, 1953
- Publication place: United States
- Media type: Print
- Pages: 243 (paperback)
- ISBN: 978-0-345-40502-9
- OCLC: 38014790
- Dewey Decimal: 813/.54 21
- LC Class: PS3563.O668 B75 1997

Bring the Jubilee is a 1953 alternate history novel by American writer Ward Moore.

The point of divergence occurs in July 1863 when the Confederate States of America wins the Battle of Gettysburg and subsequently declares victory in a conflict referred to within the book as the "War of Southron Independence" on July 4, 1864, after the surrender of the United States of America. The novel takes place in the impoverished rump United States in the mid-20th century as war looms between the Confederacy and its rival, the German Union. History takes an unexpected turn when the protagonist Hodge Backmaker, a historian, decides to travel back in time to witness the moment when the South won the war.

The phrase "Bring the Jubilee" is a reference to the chorus of the popular military song "Marching Through Georgia".

== Setting ==
=== History ===
In the wake of Robert E. Lee's great victory at the Battle of Gettysburg and subsequent capture of Philadelphia, the United States was forced to recognize Confederate independence with the Treaty of Reading on July 4, 1864, which became known as Southron Independence Day. Lee succeeded Jefferson Davis to become the second Confederate President in 1865 (in reality, the Confederate Constitution set the end of Davis's term in early 1868). Although Lee tried to establish a benevolent national policy, and was able to free the slaves, his anti-imperialistic desires were thwarted by a Congress with increasingly imperialistic ambitions, which sent forces to invade Mexico and expanded southward in Latin America. The Confederacy thrived as cities like Washington-Baltimore (merged from those two cities plus Alexandria) and Leesburg (formerly Mexico City) became renowned international centers of culture and learning. The Confederacy stood as one of the world's two superpowers following the German Union's decisive victory in the Emperors' War (1914–1916) in Europe (analogous to World War I). The German Union (an apparent merger of the German and Austro-Hungarian empires) formed an alliance with a rejuvenated Spanish Empire. To maintain the balance of power, the Confederacy allied with the British Empire. Tensions grew between the CSA and the Germans up until the 1950s, and people around the world lived under constant threat of impending war, with the defenseless United States certain to be the battleground.

=== Culture ===
The Confederacy's living standards, economic growth, political influence, education standards, and military strength are reminiscent of the post-World War II United States. Although slavery has been abolished, to a large extent because of the efforts of men such as Robert E. Lee, conditions are still poor for ethnic minorities. Immigration is encouraged nevertheless, with immigrants being made subjects (not citizens) of the Confederacy, similar to the conquered Latin American population. Suffrage is limited to males whose ancestors were Confederate citizens on July 4, 1864. Technology developed along different lines, as the internal combustion engine, incandescent light bulb, and heavier-than-air flying craft were never created. Steam-powered "minibiles" and dirigibles are the primary powered means of transportation in wealthier nations; most people still ride horses for short distances or take trains for longer trips. All communication is done by letter or telegraphs, which by this point had become a fixture in all prosperous homes in much the way that telephones had in reality, and all children learned to understand telegraphy at an early age until the act became as common and as natural as reading. Film is also still developed, with sound being produced by a machine operated by compressed air.

In sharp contrast to the Confederacy's prosperity, the United States is depicted as a rump state trapped in perpetual recession, with unemployment and corruption rampant. The U.S. is so destitute that a transcontinental railroad is never constructed past Iowa, while the Confederacy built seven. The only community of Americans who are generally prosperous are the Mormons in the western State of Deseret, who still practice polygamy. Otherwise, only successful landowners and the few lucky winners of the highly popular national lottery are able to rise above the semi-destitute lives of average citizens; most able-bodied adults are reduced to "indenting" themselves to businesspeople in exchange for the meager economic security that such affords. U.S. citizens are more hostile to Blacks than Confederates, seeing them as a major cause of the Union's downfall, and unwanted competition over the few available jobs. Those blacks who have not left the U.S. for Africa are constantly derided, harassed, threatened, and sometimes mass-lynched by whites. The Republican and Democratic parties have faded away; a new two party system consists of the Confederate-influenced Whigs and the ineffectual Populists. (The narrator lists William Jennings Bryan, George Norris, and Norman Thomas among the most famous Populists and describes the election of Whig Thomas E. Dewey as President in 1940.) The U.S. military is practically nonexistent (apparently a provision of the 1864 treaty), with foreign powers frequently deploying troops unopposed across the U.S. in regions where their nationals have been attacked—a common occurrence, as many rural areas are poorly governed and lawlessness is rampant in them; highwaymen are a constant threat to the few travelers. The long-standing economic depression has led to a rather puritanical culture favoring late marriage and few children in each family. This, combined with a ban on immigration and the emigration of ambitious young people, has resulted in an overall declining population. Higher education is in a state of decay, being more concerned with status than education, with faculty members being constantly scrutinized and summarily fired if they demonstrate "abnormal ideas", reminiscent of McCarthyism.

== Plot ==
The narrator of the novel is Hodgins "Hodge" McCormick Backmaker, who writes a diary of his life in our timeline, year 1877. Hodge was born in 1921 in the alternate timeline in Wappingers Falls, Dutchess County, New York. In 1938 at age 17, he travels to New York City, the largest city of the United States (and yet a backwater compared to some Confederate cities), in a desperate attempt to gain admittance to a college or university. After being robbed of his few possessions, he comes into contact with the "Grand Army", a nationalistic organization working to restore the United States to its former glory through acts of sabotage and terrorism. One of the Grand Army's operations involves counterfeiting Spanish currency, with the goal of provoking war between the Confederacy and the German Union in Spanish territories, sparing the U.S. from becoming the two superpowers' battlefield. Despite remaining critical of the organization's activities, Hodge accepts work and lodging with a Grand Army member who is using a bookstore as a front. Content to work for food and the opportunity to read at every waking hour, Hodge stays in the bookstore for six years. (Young Hodge's life is largely autobiographical of Ward Moore.) One friend he meets during this time is Consul Enfandin, an emissary of the Republic of Haiti, the only independent American republic south of the Mason–Dixon line.

Hodge leaves New York in 1944 for rural Pennsylvania, where his aspiration of becoming a historian, specializing in the war between North and South, becomes a reality when he is invited to join a co-operative society named Haggershaven. The society was founded by the children of a Confederate Major named Herbert Haggerwells, who settled after the war in the land he had helped defeat. He becomes acquainted with his recruiter Barbara Haggerwells, an emotionally disturbed research scientist on the verge of developing time travel. Many secondary characters with their own subplots are introduced during this part of the story, including some of the last few Asian-Americans alive (after a series of horrifying pogroms against their kind throughout North America) and a mysterious Spanish refugee woman who forms a love triangle with Hodge and Barbara. In 1952, the time machine has been perfected, and Hodge takes the opportunity to finally see in person the Battle of Gettysburg which was fought not far from Haggershaven. Wearing a special watch to keep track of the differences in time, he travels back in time to 1863, where he then inadvertently causes the death of Captain Herbert Haggerwells ("never to be Major now", remarks Hodge when he recognizes that the dead man was a younger version of the exalted portrait on Haggershaven's living room walls), who would have occupied Little Round Top for the South during the battle. In Hodge's timeline, Haggerwells' men held the hill so that the Confederates won the Battle of Gettysburg, paving the way for their victory over the Union in Philadelphia a year later; in the resultant timeline (our own), Union Colonel Strong Vincent's 83rd Pennsylvania Infantry and Colonel Joshua Chamberlain's 20th Maine Volunteer Infantry Regiment occupy the hill early on and successfully repel Confederate advances. In the novel, Hodge asserts that Little Round Top is the key to the battle, and thus the war. Hodge's actions have led to Union control of the hill, so events play out as they did in our timeline, much to the surprise of Hodge, who witnesses Pickett's Charge having a different outcome than he read about. The South loses the battle, and eventually the war.

With history changed to make the world we know, Hodge discovers he is unable to return to his previous reality since the circumstances that had made the development of time travel possible have been unalterably changed: technology evolves along different lines, and Haggerwells has died before siring any descendants including Barbara, so Haggershaven and the time machine will never exist. Hodge, stranded in our timeline, hires himself out as a farmhand at the estate which would have been Haggershaven but is now owned by the Thammis family. Between 1863 and 1877 (when he is writing this story), Hodge comes to realize that the changed post-war United States is in some ways superior to the equivalent timeline in his past. He also finds it fascinating that people always talk of the Civil War rather than the War of Southron Independence, since the victors' name for the war takes precedence. However, he has an ominous feeling about the inauguration of Rutherford B. Hayes, suspecting that it will end the Reconstruction Era prematurely and weaken the cause of civil rights. Hodge then explains why he felt his story had to be written down, because he has considered the possibility of other timelines existing in parallel universes but has come to the conclusion that by preventing the future he was born in, he destroyed the only dimension where travel between them was possible. With this, the story ends abruptly in mid-sentence.

An "editorial note" following the story relates how one Frederick Winter Thammis had found Hodge's diary while remodeling his house in 1953, the year the real life book came out. Frederick's father had grown up knowing Hodge as a beloved ex-servant kept on a pension after he was too old to work. The family enjoyed listening to Hodge's stories of the world he was born in, but had not thought him fully sane. The junior Thammis says the story reminds him of The Wizard of Oz. Thammis notes that he has found a watch of a unique, two-dialed design with the manuscript, and ends the book by quoting from a recent history book which asks what could possibly have caused the Confederates' failure to occupy Little Round Top, "an error with momentous consequences".

== Reception ==
Of the contemporary reviews, Groff Conklin characterized the novel as "an important original work… richly and realistically imagine[d]." P. Schuyler Miller noted its "mature, meticulously thought-out structure" and "the care" of worldbuilding, but said that "many readers may find this […] deliberately dull. […] It won’t be to everyone’s taste. But it will be interesting to see what the non-specialist reviewers have to say." Damon Knight was outright caustic: "real events of 1836-1952 are incomparably more interesting, more surprising, and even more novelistic than Moore’s inventions. The characters, with only two or three minor exceptions, are wooden; the one science-fiction element, the time machine, is of 1930 Wonder Stories vintage; the style is literate, grammatical and stiff as a board."

On reissues or in historical overviews, the novel was generally hailed as a classic. Richard A. Lupoff described it as "one of the most ingenious parallel world stories ever written." David Pringle included it in Science Fiction: The 100 Best Novels. Aldiss and Wingrove listed it as a "brilliant alternate history novel" and noted that its "wit and ingenuity" were influential in the genre. John Kessel gave it a kind of honorary mention in his list of the SF canon's most influential books under The Man in the High Castle: "Along with Ward Moore’s Bring the Jubilee, popularized the alternate history as a part of the genre." The Jewish Daily Forward named it among "the best literary examples of alternate history." Algis Budrys, however, echoed Miller and Knight: "Bring the Jubilee has always seemed a little labored to me", though he still singled it out among a few examples that "tower up" in the subgenre.

The theme of the Confederacy winning the Civil War and becoming an independent state was not a new one, as Winston Churchill's segment of If It Had Happened Otherwise and Murray Leinster's Sidewise in Time had toyed with the idea in the 1930s. However, Moore's book was more developed and reached a slightly wider audience than those two works, and encouraged many later writers to take up the same thread. Virtually all of them, however, depicted the USA rump state as doing better than in Moore's book. MacKinlay Kantor's magazine serial novella If the South Had Won the Civil War (1960, published in book form 1961) and Harry Turtledove's The Guns of the South (1992) also include the plot element of Robert E. Lee succeeding Jefferson Davis as President of a victorious Confederacy (Kantor's book also has Lee win at Gettysburg, while Turtledove's has him aided by time travelers the year after losing the battle). Turtledove later depicted a very different version of Confederate independence in the Southern Victory series of 11 books which begins with Lee winning the war almost 9 months before the Battle of Gettysburg would have taken place, making the questions of Pickett's Charge, Little Round Top, etc., irrelevant. Newt Gingrich and some co-authors published a trilogy of books depicting in detail an alternate history in which the Confederacy wins at Gettysburg and still the Union wins the overall war (in fact, quicker than in actual history).

== Publication history ==
A shorter, novella-length version of Bring the Jubilee appeared in the November 1952 issue of The Magazine of Fantasy & Science Fiction before publication of the novel. Boucher and McComas praised the expansion for including "a thoroughly justified increase in background detail and depth of characterization".

The novel was originally published in 1953 by Ballantine Books and Farrar, Straus & Young. It was republished in 1965 by Four Square Science Fiction. It was reissued by Avon Books in the 1970s and by Del Rey Books in 1997. In 2001, the novella was included in the anthology The Best Alternate History Stories of the 20th Century.

== See also ==
- 1953 in science fiction
- American Civil War alternate histories
