= A Rebel in Time =

1983 science fiction novel by Harry Harrison

- First US edition (p/b)
- Author: Harry Harrison
- Cover artist: Howard Chaykin
- Language: English
- Genre: Science fiction
- Publisher: Tor Books
- Publication date: February 1983
- Publication place: United States
- Media type: Print (Hardcover)
- Pages: 315
- ISBN: 0-523-48554-9
- OCLC: 40761330
- LC Class: CPB Box no. 2650 vol. 5

A Rebel in Time (also published as Rebel in Time) is a 1983 science fiction novel by American writer Harry Harrison.

== Plot ==
The book centers on a racist colonel, Wesley McCulloch, and his black pursuer, Troy Harmon. McCulloch and Harmon both originate from the modern era, the book opening with Harmon called in by a special military watchdog organization to investigate why McCulloch has been buying large quantities of gold.

The case worsens when it is discovered that McCulloch has murdered three people to cover his plans. The theft of a World War II–vintage Sten submachine gun and the plans for such also add to the mystery about what McCulloch is up to.

Before long, Harmon comes to the conclusion McCulloch has used a secret experimental time machine to try to change the outcome of the American Civil War, giving victory to the Confederacy through the introduction of the easily manufactured Sten gun. Harmon determines he must follow McCulloch into the past to bring justice. During the ensuing chase, Harmon discovers first-hand the prejudices of the people at the time.

McCulloch is killed during the struggle in the past and Harmon successfully prevents his plans of empowering the Confederacy. He uses McCulloch's fortune to fund the First Regiment of Massachusetts Coloured Volunteers, which went on to fight nobly in the Civil War.

When a colleague from the future is sent back in time to retrieve him, he determines that they are from different realities as she was from a future affected by his actions in the past, indicating that history had changed. He declines to desert his regiment, choosing to stay in the past fighting for a better future.

== Reception ==
Greg Costikyan reviewed A Rebel in Time in Ares Magazine #14 and commented that "A Rebel in Time is an old-fashioned adventure story of the time-travel genre, something which, I trust, will appeal to those interested in history as well as science fiction."

== Reviews ==
- Review by Martyn Taylor (1984) in Paperback Inferno, #49

== See also ==
- The Guns of the South
- American Civil War alternate histories
- Transdimensional Teenage Mutant Ninja Turtles in 1989 featured an adventure on pages 96–99 called "Doc Feral's Dynamic Dimensional Doohickey" where Feral's rebellious assistant Louis Evans sold four modern machine guns to the Confederate army and planned to sell them twenty more
