= If the South Had Won the Civil War =

1961 alternate history book by Kantor

- Author: MacKinlay Kantor
- Country: United States
- Language: English
- Genre: Alternate history
- Published: 1961

If the South Had Won the Civil War is a 1961 alternate history book by MacKinlay Kantor, a writer who also wrote several novels about the American Civil War. It was originally published in the November 22, 1960, issue of Look magazine. It generated such a response that it was published in 1961 as a book.

The book is written in the manner of a history text published in the alternate reality of 1961 and describing the developments of the past century, in which the Confederate States of America had existed as a separate nation-state. It includes numerous footnotes and quotations from various (fictional) historical writings.

The book had a considerable influence on the development of the subgenre of American Civil War alternate histories, one of the two most frequent subjects of American alternate history. Later writers of such books, such as Harry Turtledove, explicitly stated Kantor's influence on their own work.

== Alternate historical timeline ==
The book starts with the assumption that Union General Ulysses S. Grant was killed by being accidentally thrown off his horse on May 12, 1863, at the start of the Vicksburg Campaign. In the aftermath, General John Alexander McClernand insisted on assuming command despite being a political appointee who was not fit for the job. By thoroughly bad generalship, McClernand managed to lose the Vicksburg Campaign and get the Army of the Tennessee almost completely destroyed. Soon afterwards, at the Battle of Gettysburg, Confederate General Robert E. Lee made some better decisions than in actual history and managed to win the battle and largely destroy the Union Army of the Potomac as well.

Two such major disasters following one upon the other caused a panic reaction in the North. Washington, D.C. descended into total chaos, with mobs running through the streets, looting, raping, and lynching blacks; Lee's army captured the city without firing a shot and proceeded to restore order. With the mobs howling for Abraham Lincoln's blood, it was safest for him to be taken into a comfortable custody at Richmond, Virginia from where he sent northwards a letter announcing his resignation and conceding the Confederacy's victory.

To Vice President Hannibal Hamlin, who became President following Lincoln's resignation, fell the bitter work of negotiating the border with the newly independent CS. The most bitter pill he had to swallow was to concede the permanent loss of Washington and its transformation into the Confederate capital (with the District of Columbia being renamed the District of Dixie), made inevitable when Maryland joined the Confederacy like Kentucky.

Hamlin's main achievement was the retention of West Virginia in the Union as well as preventing pro-Confederate militias in Missouri from detaching that State. The Indian Territory remained an unresolved bone of contention.

In the debate over the location of the new US capital, President Hamlin strongly opposed the proposal of making Philadelphia the capital, which would have alienated all the states west of the Alleghenies, and supported the finally-accepted compromise of Columbus, Ohio, which is renamed "Columbia". As he declined to run in the 1864 presidential election, Hamlin did not actually get to take residence in the new capital, which was only made ready years later.

Meanwhile, Lincoln was released by the Confederates in 1864 and started a law office in Chicago. However, he was still assassinated in a theater, in this case at McVicker's Theater in Chicago.

The newly independent Confederacy suffered some instability: the restive Texas seized the contested Indian Territory and finally declared its complete independence, becoming the Second Republic of Texas. That brought the specter of war close, with either the US going to war over the Indian Territory or the Confederacy seeking to retain Texas by force, but it was averted; Texas was allowed to amicably go its own way, and relations between all three nations steadily improved. The two terms of US President James B. McPherson (in actual history, a Union officer who was killed during the Battle of Atlanta in July 1864) were marked by a strong tendency towards reconciliation with the Confederate States. His Second Inaugural Speech, arguing that the war ending in 1863 saved the lives of many who would have been killed had it dragged on, was warmly received south of the Mason–Dixon line, became part of the school curriculum, and helped achieve an eventual reunification (though it came only long after his death).

The Confederacy was also faced with the issue of slavery, very much contested despite its victory in what came to be known as "The War of the Southern Revolution." With the rest of the world abolishing slavery, Confederates started feeling that they were out of step. Virginia abolished slavery in its territory, followed by Kentucky and North Carolina, and later Maryland and Tennessee. A new political force named the Jeffersonian Party called for abolition of slavery and gained the support of such prominent people as Stephen Dodson Ramseur, Robert E. Rodes, John Pegram and, later, Leonidas Polk. Finally, Confederate slavery was fully abolished in 1885, the Liberation Bill being adopted with little opposition under the presidency of James Longstreet. Southerners having resolved this by themselves, rather than having the decision forced upon them by a victorious hostile army, helped avoid any lingering bitterness, and no organization resembling the Ku Klux Klan arose.

In 1898, it was the Confederacy that went to war with Spain, and seized and annexed Cuba. The flamboyant Rel Stuart, a son of Jeb Stuart born in 1867 (in actual history Stuart had been killed in 1864 during battle), had a major role in this war and was eventually the first governor of the State of Cuba. (In one illustration, Rel Stuart is portrayed as looking like Theodore Roosevelt.)

In the twentieth century, the US, CS, and Texas became increasingly integrated economically and removed all tariff barriers between them. In 1917, Presidents Theodore Roosevelt of the US and Woodrow Wilson of the CS brought their countries into World War I, as did the independent Texas. The soldiers of all three joined the Entente powers and fought as close allies against Germany and the Central Powers. Similar developments took place against the Axis powers in World War II. Kantor does not provide much detail of this but clearly assumes that three allied armies crossing the Atlantic together and fighting together in Europe would have achieved much the same result as a single US army achieved in the actual history.

In the aftermath, the US, CS, and Texas all felt threatened by Soviet missile bases and armored brigades in Alaska (which had never been purchased from Russia in 1867). Therefore, they finally announced a formal reunification at a Washington summit in 1961, on the precise centennial of Fort Sumter.

Thus, Kantor's version of history comes full circle, the situation in 1961 being not too different from that in actual history: a single United States as a major world power locked in Cold War with the Soviet Union, but at a considerable disadvantage compared to the actual timeline due to the Soviet position in Alaska.

== Influence on Harry Turtledove ==
Harry Turtledove, who wrote extensively in this subgenre, acknowledged the influence of Kantor's book on his own work.

In The Guns of the South, Turtledove, like Kantor, has Lee's army occupying Washington and Lee acting as a wise and generous victor. Turtledove's Southern Victory includes various elements recognizable from Kantor's book, such as abolition of Southern slavery occurring in the 1880s under President James Longstreet, Theodore Roosevelt and Woodrow Wilson being simultaneous Presidents of the US and CS respectively, Cuba annexed and incorporated into the Confederacy, and Alaska not purchased and remaining part of Russia. However, these plot elements were inserted by Turtledove into an alternate history quite antithetical to Kantor's in which, far from being reconciled, US and CS become hereditary enemies that go to war again and again and take opposing sides in both World Wars, with drastic results for the rest of the world.

== See also ==
- American Civil War alternate histories
