= Russian Amerika =

2007 novel by Stoney Compton

- First edition cover
- Author: Stoney Compton
- Cover artist: Kurt Miller
- Language: English
- Genre: Alternate history novel
- Publisher: Baen Books
- Publication date: April 3, 2007
- Publication place: United States
- Media type: Print (hardback)
- Pages: 464 pp (first edition, hardback)
- ISBN: 978-1-4165-2116-7 (first edition, hardback)
- OCLC: 76898100
- Dewey Decimal: 813/.6 22
- LC Class: PS3603.O49 R87 2007

Russian Amerika is an alternate history novel written by Stoney Compton. It is set in a world where Alaska was still owned by Russia in 1987.

== Background ==
The story is an alternate history, set in North America, which is made up of several nations:

- United States of America (Maine, New Hampshire, Vermont, Massachusetts, Rhode Island, Connecticut, New York, Pennsylvania, Delaware, the western half of Maryland, Indiana, New Jersey, West Virginia, Ohio, Michigan, Wisconsin, Minnesota, Iowa, Nova Scotia, Prince Edward Island, New Brunswick, the majority of Illinois, and Quebec south of the St Lawrence River, with Mario Cuomo hinted as being President of the United States)
- Confederate States of America (Virginia, North Carolina, South Carolina, Georgia, Florida, Alabama, Mississippi, Louisiana, Arkansas, Tennessee, Kentucky, Missouri, the southwestern portion of Illinois, the eastern half of Kansas, Cuba, and Hispaniola, with Jimmy Carter hinted as being a ranking member of its military)
- Republic of Texas (Texas, Oklahoma, and the majority of New Mexico)
- First People's Nation (Montana, Idaho, Wyoming, Colorado, North Dakota, South Dakota, Nebraska, the western half of Kansas, the central and southwestern portion of Ontario, and the southernmost portion of Manitoba)
- Deseret (Utah and the northeastern portion of Nevada)
- Republic of California (California, Oregon, a small portion of western Arizona, Baja California, and the majority of Nevada) with its capital in San Francisco and Ronald Reagan hinted as its President. (A possible incongruity, as he was born in our timeline in Tampico, Illinois, which remains part of the United States.) Its air force operates the P-61 Eureka depicted in the cover art.
- French Canada/New France (Quebec north of the St Lawrence River, Newfoundland, Labrador, and the northeastern portion of Ontario)
- British Canada (Nunavut, the Northwest Territories, Alberta, Saskatchewan, Washington, the northwestern portion of Ontario, the southeastern portion of the Yukon Territory, and the majority of British Columbia and Manitoba)
- New Spain (Mexico and Central America, Jamaica, the majority of Arizona, and the western portion of New Mexico)
- Danish America (Greenland)
- Russian Amerika (Alaska, the majority of the Yukon Territory, and the northwestern portion of British Columbia)

The reasons for this different political environment are only hinted here and there in the story, but apparently the Point of divergence is that the Civil War started in the 1850s and resulted in a victory by the Confederacy. As a post-war consequence, the US loses all ground west of the Mississippi River as American-claimed western lands secede from the Union and create their own sovereign countries in the wake of the victorious South. With the dissolution of most of its territories and influence, the United States is reduced to a struggling collective of the Great Lake and Northeastern states surrounded by hostile and powerful neighboring countries. With its economy devastated in the aftermath of the war, the US is unable to buy Alaska from Russia, so it remains a commonwealth colony throughout the 19th and 20th century.

Not many further details about the new timeline are explained except for the geopolitical landscape changes of North America that continued to change from the new-found American nations skirmishing at border states, then Canada also dissolves into individual British/French/Native colonies, and it is suggested in the sequel that Napoleon III conquered Quebec by the late 1800s. At the turn of the 20th century, without the US to interfere in the Gulf of Mexico, Spain reconquers and annexes Latin America relatively unopposed. Eventually, the American nations have managed to cease hostilities with one another and formed the North American Treaty Organization, an alternate version of the real-world NATO, but it is unknown if it is a quasi military alliance or a non-aggression pact.

The altered history of the world is not explained as much as North America except for such important events, like that the World War I did happen, as it is called the Great War. The Russian Communist revolution failed two times as Vladimir Lenin has been either exiled or executed, which is unknown, but the Tsar did rule the Russian Empire with a ruthless regime regardless. At some point, the Tsar of Russia married the Crown Princess of Spain; what effect this had is not explained, but is hinted at having given the Russians great control in Europe for some time—for Russia has developed a long-time alliance with Spain for it to re-establish its colonial empire on North America. World War II occurred in Europe, but it was another stalemated campaign similar to the First World War. The Empire of Japan had fought a war in the Pacific with the Republic of California after a surprise-attack on California's naval fleet in San Diego, a parallel to Pearl Harbor, but the altered Pacific War's outcome is left unanswered.

Along with this altered timeline came a slowed development of technology keeping the world of July 1987 at a roughly 1940s level, as no jet engines, television, atomic weapons, nor computers were ever invented (with the exception of command logic machines), but helicopters do exist without turbine propulsion and the preferred means of telecommunications in this time is by VHF radio. Political changes were slow as well, for no international communities (the League of Nations or the UN) were established either, and some countries still practice human slavery.

== Plot ==
History suggests that the year is Summer of 1987 as the book begins.

Most of the plot follows a mixed-raced man named Gregori Grogorievich. A decorated but disgraced Imperial Russian Army Major, Gregori has left the military for a maritime life in Southeastern Alaska and has a sport fishing boat which he uses for charters and occasional smuggling. He is hired one day by a Tsarist government official to make a rendezvous with a mysterious woman named Valari Kominskiya, but things go badly. The official gets drunk and tries to rape Valari and kill Gregori, but the official is killed in self-defense and thrown overboard. As Gregori tries to find out how to get out of Russian Amerika with Valari for political asylum, he is betrayed by her, as Valari is actually a spy and a high-ranking officer in the Russian Army. Gregori is captured by the government and falsely charged with the murder of the official (who was actually Valari's superior) and with the attempted rape of Valari, leading to a sentence of life of hard labor on the Russian-Canadian Highway.

After long winter months of being subjected to brutal slavery, he and a group of other prisoners are rescued by a band of native Alaskans and are taken into the wilderness to evade the Russian manhunters called promyshlennik sent to capture or kill the prisoners. It turns out that Gregori's native Alaskan rescuers are revolutionaries called the Dené Republik that seek to liberate their Yukon lands and Alaska itself from Imperial Russia which has driven them away from their home for hundreds of years. The revolutionaries offer Gregori a place in their ranks to fight the Russians. Without much choice to go back to his old life, and longing to have a chance to get revenge for being betrayed by the tyranny and corruption of the Tsarist government, Gregori joins the Alaskan forces. Throughout the winter of 1987 and early 1988, he and the other group of prisoners who also agree to join and fight their common enemy, are trained under the Dené to fight a guerrilla war against the Russian military scattered throughout Alaska while the Dené begin establishing the foundations of their would-be democracy of the new Alaska.

At first the rebels are outnumbered in the face of the Imperial forces, but after successful attacks against fortified colonial towns, capturing weapons, recruiting more people of Alaska against Imperialist rule, and military assistance from the US and California, it appears victory for independence is plausible. Although the war to liberate Alaska will go far beyond what Gregori expected of a revolution, from surviving and losing friends to the relentless pursuit from Valari partnered with a vengeful promyshlennik, traitors within the separatist Dené itself, and the unforgiving frontier, to rallying international support for the cause to fight an all-out war against the wrath of the Russian Empire that would surely decide the future of all the nations of North America.

== Sequels ==
In 2011 the follow-up Alaska Republik was published.

== Reception ==
Publishers Weekly praised Compton's "depiction of warfare under extreme arctic conditions" as "horrifyingly realistic and vivid", and noted the "plausible backstory" for the timeline. Skagit Valley Herald of Washington, US, also covered the book.
