= Fire on the Mountain (Bisson novel) =

1988 novel by Terry Bisson

- First edition cover
- Author: Terry Bisson
- Language: English
- Genre: Alternate history
- Published: 1988 (PM Press)
- Publication place: United States
- Pages: 208 (paperback)
- ISBN: 1-60486-087-1

Fire on the Mountain is a 1988 novel by the American author Terry Bisson. It is an alternate history describing the world as it would have been had John Brown succeeded in his raid on Harper's Ferry and touched off a slave rebellion in 1859, as he intended.

== Plot ==
The difference from actual history starts with the participation of Harriet Tubman in Brown's uprising in 1859; her sound tactical and strategic advice helps Brown avoid mistakes which in real history led to his downfall. As a result, instead of the American Civil War, the U.S. faces a full-scale slave revolt throughout the South helped by a handful of white sympathizers and various European revolutionaries such as Giuseppe Garibaldi, and an invasion by Mexico, which seeks to regain the territory it lost in 1848.

After a great deal of bloody fighting and an increasing dissatisfaction in the North which is required to send troops to fight the rebellious slaves, the blacks succeed in emancipating themselves and create a republic in the Deep South, led by Tubman and Frederick Douglass. (Brown himself did not survive to see the victory of what he started.) Abraham Lincoln – a Whig politician who never got to be President – tries to start a war to bring back the secessionist black states into the Union, but he fails and is himself killed in that war. Blacks remember him as their archenemy.

Later, the black state (named "Nova Africa") becomes Socialist, touching off a whole string of revolutions and civil wars in Europe. The Paris Commune wins out in 1871 instead of being crushed by the French Third Republic, Ireland breaks away from British rule in the 1880s, and the Russian Revolution is just one of many similar revolutions in different countries. Finally Socialism also wins out in the rump U.S., following a revolutionary outbreak in Chicago. Socialism works out as predicted by the German philosopher Karl Marx, bringing happiness and prosperity to all of humanity. (Marx himself is mentioned in the book as an enthusiastic supporter of the rebellious slaves, though he does not personally come to America to help them.)

The book has two levels. The overt plot takes place in 1959, in a Utopian Socialist world far in advance of ours in all ways. To mark the centennial of Brown's raid, black astronauts lead a mission to land on Mars. However, the story of the protagonist, a young black woman grieving the death of her husband on an earlier Mars mission, is mainly the framework for excerpts from the vivid diaries of two people who lived through the stirring events of 1859 and its aftermath – her ancestor, who was then a young black slave, and a white Virginian doctor who sympathized with the rebellion. In this world, an alternate history book is published called John Brown's Body, which describes a world in which Brown failed and was executed, the slaves were emancipated by Lincoln rather than by themselves after a war between two white factions, and capitalism survived as a political and economic system. It is considered a dystopia, describing a horrible world in all ways inferior to the one which the people in the book know.

== Reception ==
David Pringle rated Fire on the Mountain three stars out of four and described the novel as "a skilful evocation of an unlikely alternate history".

== See also ==
- American Civil War alternate histories

== Sources ==
- James R. Knight, John Brown - History and Myth, pp 87–94
- Bisson, T. (1988). Fire on the Mountain. Arbor House.
