= David Poyer =

American author

- Born: DuBois, Pennsylvania
- Military career
- Allegiance: United States
- Other work: writer

David Poyer (born 1949) is an American author and retired naval officer. He has written over 40 books, mostly novels.

== Early life ==
He was born in DuBois, Pennsylvania in 1949.

== Career ==
Poyer graduated from the U.S. Naval Academy in 1971. He wrote as an active duty naval officer and a naval reserve captain; his service included duty in the Atlantic, Arctic, Pacific, Caribbean, and Persian Gulf area prior to his retirement from the Navy in July 2001.

Poyer began writing in 1976 and as of 2021 had published well over forty books. He has been called "the most popular living author of American sea fiction".

Although best known for his naval fiction, during the 1980s, Poyer also wrote alternative history and science fiction under the pseudonym David Andreissen. He has also published short fiction and nonfiction in numerous magazines, and is currently the contributing editor of SHIPMATE Magazine.

Poyer's most popular novels, set in the present day, follow the career of U.S. Navy officer Dan Lenson, a thoughtful surface line officer whose ethical questioning sometimes conflicts with his duty. Another series, more slanted to the adventure genre, features an ex-Coast Guard commercial diver, Lyle "Tiller" Galloway. Both series have been published by St. Martin's Press. A series about the US Navy during the American Civil War is also published by Simon & Schuster. According to Poyer, much of his work draws upon his own experiences in military service and as a cruising sailor and sport diver.

Poyer also published a series of books set in a fictional Hemlock County. They explore the history and folklore of north-western Pennsylvania, and the Pennsylvania oil industry that was the original basis for American industrial power. One of the 2018 books in the series, Thunder on the Mountain, is set in the Great Depression period.

Poyer taught in the Wilkes University MA/MFA low-residency program in Creative Writing for sixteen years. He retired from teaching in 2021 but still consults. He's a fellow of the Ossabaw Writers Retreat and the Virginia Center for the Creative Arts, a life member of ASNE, SNA, and USNAAA, and has served as a board member of the Library of Virginia and the Eastern Shore Public Library.

== Personal life ==
He lives with Lenore Hart on Virginia's Eastern Shore.

== Publications ==
=== Dan Lenson Novels ===
- The Gulf, St Martins Press, 1990. ISBN 0312050968
- The Med, St. Martin's Paperbacks 1991
- The Circle, St. Martin's Paperbacks, 1993.
- The Passage, St. Martin's Paperbacks, 1997
- Tomahawk, St. Martin's Paperbacks, 2000.
- China Sea, St. Martin's Press, 2000. ISBN 0312202873
- Black Storm, St. Martin's Paperbacks, 2003.
- The Command, St. Martin's Press, 2005.
- Korea Strait, St. Martin's Press, 2007.
- The Threat, St. Martin's Paperbacks, 2007.
- The Weapon, St. Martin's Press, 2008. ISBN 9780312374938
- The Crisis, St. Martin's Press, 2009.
- The Towers, St. Martin's Press, 2011.
- The Cruiser, St. Martin's Press, 2014.
- Tipping Point, St. Martin's Press, 2015.
- Onslaught, St. Martin's Press, 2016. ISBN 978-1-250-05631-3
- Hunter Killer, St. Martin's Press, 2017.
- Deep War, St. Martin's Press, 2018.
- Overthrow, St. Martin's Press, 2019
- Violent Peace, St. Martin's Press, 2020
- Arctic Sea, St. Martin's Press, 2021
- The Academy, St. Martin's Press, December 12, 2023 ISBN 978-1250273086

=== Tiller Galloway Thrillers ===
- Bahamas Blue, St. Martin's Paperbacks, 1992.
- Hatteras Blue, St. Martin's Paperbacks, 1992.
- Louisiana Blue, St. Martin's Paperbacks, 1995.
- Down to a Sunless Sea, St. Martin's Paperbacks, 1998. ISBN 0312145896

=== Hemlock County ===
- The Dead of Winter, Tor Books, 1988.
- As The Wolf Loves Winter, Forge Books, 1997.
- Thunder on the Mountain, Forge Books, 2000.

=== Others ===
- White Continent Jove Publications, 1980.
- The Shiloh Project: What If The Civil War Happened Now? Avon Books, 1981.
- Star Seed (Starblaze Editions), Walsworth Publishing Company, 1982.
- The Return of Philo T. McGiffin St. Martin's Press, 1983.
- Stepfather Bank St. Martin's Press, 1988.
- Task Force 61 New English Library Ltd, 1990.
- Winter in the Heart Tor Books, 1994.
- The Only Thing to Fear Tor Books, 1996. ISBN 0312857098
- The Return of Philo T. McGiffin (Bluejacket Books) US Naval Institute Press, 1997 (reissue)
- A Stopover in Utah (Kalliope: a Journal of women's literature and art, 1 998)
- Fire on the Waters : A Novel of the Civil War at Sea Simon & Schuster, 2003.
- A Country of Our Own: A Novel of the Confederate Raiders Simon & Schuster, 2005.
- That Anvil of Our Souls: A Novel of the Monitor and the Merrimack Simon & Schuster, 2006.
- Ghosting St. Martin's Press, 2010.
- The Whiteness of the Whale, St. Martin's Press, 2013.
- Heroes of Annapolis, Northampton House Press, 2018.
