= Captain Confederacy =

Alternate history comic book

Publication information
- Publisher: SteelDragon Press (first series); Marvel Comics (second series)
- Schedule: Monthly
- Format: Miniseries
- Genre: Alternate history, superhero
- Publication date: 1986 (first series); November 1991 – February 1992 (second series)
- No. of issues: 12 (first series); 4 (second series)

Creative team
- Created by: Will Shetterly; Vince Stone

Captain Confederacy is an alternate history comic book by Will Shetterly and Vince Stone that was first published in 1986 for a twelve-issue series, revived in 1991–92 for a four-issue series, then published online with new and revised material in 2011. It tells the story of a superhero created for propaganda purposes in a world in which the Confederate States of America won their independence from the United States.

== Publication history ==
Issues #1–12 were published beginning in 1986 by SteelDragon Press. A special edition of issue #1 was also published with some revisions. John M. Ford plotted three issues of the first series and wrote one, issue #10's "Driving North". The series is, as of July 2015, available online in a somewhat revised form. It was also collected in two trade paperbacks.

The second series was published by Marvel's Epic Comics and can also be found online. A connected story Yankee UFO, concerning a person from another alternative history where Ted Kennedy is President of the United States trapped in Captain Confederacy's world, was published online in 2008.

== Title character ==
The first Captain Confederacy, featured in the first series, is an out-of-work actor who agrees to undergo a biological experiment that grants him super strength, enhanced agility and healing abilities as well as limited psychic abilities, but those chemicals are addictive and are slowly killing him. In the second series, the new Captain Confederacy is a black woman, pregnant with the previous Captain's baby. She has similar superpowers garnered from the same source.

== Plot ==
The first series, published in the SteelDragon Press run, tells how the first Captain Confederacy, a white man, becomes disillusioned with Confederate society after the death of his friend. Both the Captain and his friend are actors in a series of staged TV "news events" which are actually propaganda designed to maintain and reinforce the Confederate ideals by portraying Confederate-themed superheroes Captain Confederacy and his female sidekick Miss Dixie battling a black supervillain Blacksnake (his friend in real life). When his friend becomes fed up with his status as a second class citizen within the Confederacy and his own culpability in perpetuating same for his race through his participation in the propaganda, he refuses to continue in his TV role, and he is shot. This leads Captain Confederacy to rebel against his country. All of the superheroes/actors involved were given medical treatments which produced genuine superpowers (both physical and psionic), to enhance the realism of the propaganda news telecasts. They discover that the effects of these treatments have both made them addicts and are slowly killing them.

The second series focuses on the struggle to control the politics of the North American countries, at a world superhero conference in Free Louisiana.

== World ==
In the alternative history, the Confederacy won the Civil War, which resulted in a fracturing of the North American continent, mostly affecting what was the United States of America into eight nations. These nations are the Confederate States of America (also containing several Caribbean possessions), the Free State of Louisiana (smaller than the real state of Louisiana, but containing the city of New Orleans), the remaining Northern states as the United States of America, the Republic of Texas (also includes portions of what was Mexico), the Great Spirit Alliance (called "Tecumseh" in the original series's map — also includes portions of Canada), the Mormon nation of Deseret, The People's Republic of California (including Baja California) and Pacifica (called "Sequoyah" in the original series's map — also includes portions of Canada). Canada and Mexico exist, but have lost territory to the various other nations.

The means by which the CSA managed to retain its independence was never explained in the series. In the 2018 trade paperback edition, Shetterly's afterward explains that he purposefully omitted an in-universe explanation, because he wanted to let the readers' imagination decide this.

Each of these nations has its own propaganda heroes similar to the original Captain Confederacy, though empowered through different means and technologies (armored suits, drugs, etc.). A version of the Underground Railroad exists within the Confederacy to help oppressed minorities escape to Canada, the United States, or occasionally a smaller nation such as Deseret.

Outside North America, a Japan analogue, Nippon (a native name of Japan), exists as an ally to the People's Republic of California, having a military base there. Germany on the other hand, is a global power, with a system of militarized defensive satellites. A cold war of sorts exists between Germany and Nippon.

The technology of this world's 1967 (the year in which the story begins) seems analogous to the real world in about 1980. Although advanced technology was used to create the superheroes, it does not seem to be in widespread use by the general public. Dirigibles seem a common means of air transportation. The President of the Confederate States is a woman named Lee, hinted to be a descendant of Robert E. Lee. Miss Dixie calls the President "aunt" at one point, though it is not explained whether this implies blood relation or simply affection. Medical science also is about the same as 1980s medicine. There is a complete separation of healthcare and state in that there is no single-payer nor any programs akin to Medicaid. Anyone who can afford it has access to medicine, but due to the economic situation minorities receive less treatment in Confederate healthcare than do whites. Governments do not seem inclined to share their technological means.

Commercially, McDonald's is known for its fast food burritos, although it has plans to introduce a new ground beef sandwich with cheese, while KFC sells catfish, not chicken. Both chains seem ubiquitous within the Confederacy.

Science fiction is known by Scientifiction and appears more popular than in the real world. Margaret Mitchell wrote a well known book, Glorious Tomorrows, hinted to be an analog of Gone with the Wind but set in a victorious Dixie. The Beacon Hillbillies, an analog of The Beverly Hillbillies, is a television comedy popular in the USA that makes fun of the CSA. Patsy Cline and James Dean are still alive in 1967, with Dean becoming too old to play the "rebellious youth" roles that first made him a star.

== Reception ==
Southern Magazine found the plots are intricate and creative, but noted that this is not a comic for children. Comics Buyer's Guide found the comic an "excellent alternate-Earth science fiction".

In Reconstructing Dixie: Race, Gender, and Nostalgia in the Imagined South by Tara McPherson (Duke University), McPherson wrote: "From the retooled Stars and Bars of Captain Confederacy's costume to the mapping of urban and rural southern places, the series takes up the symbols of the South and imaginitively reconstructs them, shaking loose the stock figures, geographies, and temporalities of southerness. If Octavia Butler and Kara Walker alter the meaning of the southern lady, Shetterly reconfigures the southern gentleman, unfixing his location in an idealized Civil War past, instead deploying him for a different understanding of our present".

Heavy Metal reviewed the comic in June 2015, finding it to "address the South's old ghosts" and that the determination of if the comic was a successful examination of the current southern society of merely provocative is left up to readers to decide.

A family who gave an issue of the comic to their 11-year-old son found the comic offensive, creating a minor controversy.

According to the Smithsonian magazine, the comic was featured in 2017 at the American Civil War Museum in Richmond, Virginia.

== Production ==
In an interview, writer Shetterly says he wanted to explore racism in a way that was not allowed by the main comic book companies. He stated that he wanted to examine the national superhero and felt that what he saw as the national jingoism of the George W. Bush administration continued to make the series relevant.
