= Jay Winik =

American author and historian

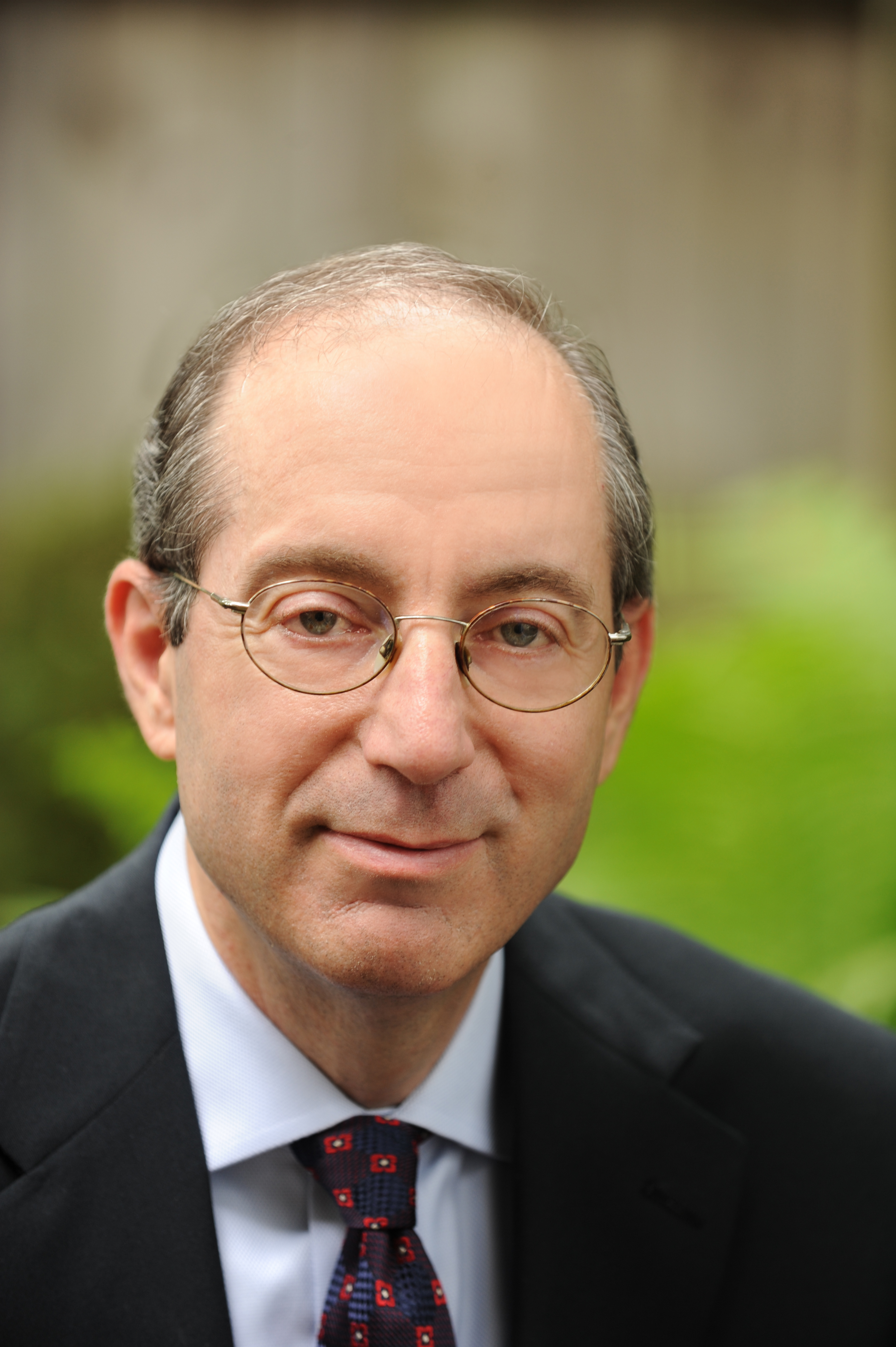
- Born: February 8, 1957 (age 69); New Haven, Connecticut, U.S.
- Education: Yale College London School of Economics Yale University
- Occupations: Writer and historian
- Writing career
- Notable works: April 1865, The Great Upheaval, 1944

Jay Winik (born February 8, 1957) is an author and historian who wrote April 1865: The Month That Saved America.

== Education and early career ==
Winik is an honors graduate of Yale College. He also holds an M.Sc. in economics from the London School of Economics with distinction and a Ph.D. from Yale University. He played on the Yale tennis team and was an editor of the Yale Daily News.

== Career ==
He had a brief career in the U.S. government's foreign policy, involving civil wars around the globe, from the former Yugoslavia to El Salvador, Nicaragua, and Cambodia, including helping to create the United Nations plan to end the Cambodian Civil War. In 1991, he took up writing history full-time.

He has been the inaugural Historian-in-Residence at the Council on Foreign Relations.

Winik's articles and history book reviews have been published in the New York Times, Atlantic magazine, Time magazine, Newsweek, National Review, The Washington Post, and The Wall Street Journal, to which he has been a frequent contributor. He has appeared on national broadcasts such as The Today Show, Fresh Air and Morning Edition with Scott Simon, CNN, Good Morning America, and The NewsHour with Jim Lehrer. He has provided historical commentary for documentaries on the History Channel and PBS as well as C-SPAN, and was the Presidential Historian for Fox News for Barack Obama's and Donald Trump's 2017 inaugurations and Senator Ted Kennedy's funeral.

In 2002 he was a regular on the History Channel weekly show, The History Center. He was a principal history commentator for the History Channel special Pearl Harbor: 24 Hours After. In 2013, he was a historical advisor to National Geographic and the consulting historian for their six-part series, The 1980s: The Decade That Made Us, which aired in over 100 countries.

In a New York Times op-ed, Winik correctly predicted a long guerrilla struggle in Iraq, while Time magazine noted that Winik's April 1865 was a powerful reminder about how a war's end is every bit as important as how or why it had begun.

== Reception ==
The Baltimore Sun has called Winik “one of the nation's leading public historians”. He is the author of the highly acclaimed, number one bestseller April 1865 (2001), which also became a History Channel documentary and a stage production, both of which feature him. In 2007 Winik published the New York Times' bestselling The Great Upheaval: America and the Birth of the Modern World, which both USA Today and The Financial Times picked as one of their “Best Books of the Year.” Winik's latest book is 1944: FDR and the Year That Changed History, also a NYT best-seller. It has stimulated a broad national conversation about morality and foreign policy.

Winik has been read by political leaders including Bill Clinton, George W. Bush, Harry Reid, and Mitch McConnell as well as Chief Justice John Roberts and numerous celebrities. Winik appears on the first page of George W. Bush's presidential memoir Decision Points, discussing the craft of writing history with the president. Just after the September 11 attacks, Bush was seen carrying April 1865 in the White House.

In 2017 in the New York Times, actor Tom Hanks read an excerpt from April 1865 to Maureen Dowd about slavery and race relations. He told the NYT that Winik's April 1865 is on his nightstand. Peggy Noonan also told the NYT that 1944 is on her nightstand.

== Affiliations ==
Winik serves as a trustee or advisory board member on a number of nonprofit boards, including for American Heritage Magazine, the Abraham Lincoln Bicentennial Commission, Ford's Theatre Society, and its Lincoln Legacy Project, The Civil War Preservation Trust, the Lincoln Forum, the Washington Tennis and Education Foundation, and the Potomac School, as well as the Governing Council of the National Endowment for the Humanities. He also currently serves on the board of trustees for The American Folk Life Center of the Library of Congress, as well as the Veterans History Project of the Library of Congress.

== Memberships ==
He is a member of the Council on Foreign Relations and an elected Fellow of the Society of American Historians. Appointed by President Donald Trump, he sat on the board of trustees of the United States Holocaust Memorial Museum.

== Works ==
External videos
- Presentation by Winik on April 1865, April 12, 2001, C-SPAN
- Booknotes interview with Winik on April 1865, July 29, 2001, C-SPAN
- Washington Journal interview with Winik on The Great Upheaval, September 14, 2007, C-SPAN
- Presentation by Winik on 1944, September 5, 2015, C-SPAN

- The Great Upheaval. HarperCollins. 13 October 2009. ISBN 978-0-06-182671-9.
- April 1865: The Month That Saved America, G.K. Hall, 2001, ISBN 9780783895819; April 1865. HarperCollins. 16 November 2010. ISBN 978-0-06-202920-1.
- 1944: FDR and the Year That Changed History, Simon & Schuster, 2015, ISBN 9781439114087.
- 1861: The Lost Peace, Grand Central Publishing, 2025, ISBN 978-1538735121.
