= Damnation (video game) =

2009 video game

- Developers: Blue Omega Entertainment; Point of View, Inc.
- Publisher: Codemasters
- Designer: Jacob Minkoff
- Writer: Michael Urbanski
- Engine: Unreal Engine 3
- Platforms: Microsoft Windows, PlayStation 3, Xbox 360
- Release: EU: May 22, 2009; NA: May 26, 2009; AU: June 4, 2009
- Genre: Third-person shooter
- Modes: Single-player, multiplayer

Damnation is a steampunk shooter, co-developed by Blue Omega Entertainment and Point of View, Inc., and published by Codemasters. It was released in 2009 on Microsoft Windows, PlayStation 3 and Xbox 360.

== Gameplay ==
Damnation features large, open environments where a variety of acrobatics and Hollywood-action stunts are possible. Damnation features verticality which differentiates it from many other games in the genre. Damnation has steam-powered vehicles which are also able to execute various feats of mobility, such as climbing up walls.

== Plot ==
=== Setting ===
Damnation is set in an alternate history version of the U.S., in which the American Civil War stretches several decades and highly advanced steampunk technology spearheads the great technological advancement, instead of combustion engines. This results in the introduction of highly advanced technology like steam-powered vehicles, war machines and robots. During the war, Thomas Edison and Nikola Tesla were charged with sedition, which enables a genius inventor named Prescott and his corporation, P.S.I., to become exclusive suppliers of arms to the US government. Prescott's advanced weaponry enables the Civil War to come to an end but Prescott has been scheming to overthrow the U.S. government and remake the U.S. into an American Empire to rule the world.

=== Synopsis ===
Several years after the end of the bloody American Civil War, industrialist Prescott overthrows President Abraham Lincoln's administration and establishes a dictatorship. Several US Army splinter groups, primarily led by Captain Hamilton Rourke, form a resistance movement against Prescott.

During Rourke's adventures, he works with or against a number of characters, including Yakecan, an ally and Indian healer, Jack, a scientist for the enemy, and Professor Winslow, Jack's father. He also works with a shaman named Akahando against the forces of Prescott.

The Resistance army is fighting PSI, led by Commander Selina, on a bridge in a deserted city named Arrowtree. Hamilton and his group fight their way through the city to the bridge and destroy it. PSI then uses a specialized tank to bridge the gap with special tracks and continue fighting. As they make their escape the Professor is captured and the rest retreat on to their airship, the Corsair. Then Yakecan's brother Akhahandro tells them that Prescott is raping the earth of its resources to make "Serum", which makes his soldiers fight harder. The group leaves to rescue the Professor with the help of their new powers that allow them to see enemies before they see them. The group lands in Boom Town where the citizens are crazy on serum. They were miners before Prescott infected their water supply and made them blood thirsty. They fight their way through and meet up with the injured enemy Jack, who happens to be the daughter of the Professor, they take her and he repairs her arm. But she escapes on a plane and the group goes after her but are shot down by Selina's troops. Prescott captures Akahando and forces him to use his powers to see the future. Hamilton fights his way through the rest of the city and finds Selina who attempts to kill them with a turret but Jack comes and helps them fight. They defeat Selina and escape and Jack finds out Prescott's true intentions on domination. Selina survived and rides away with Hamilton going after so he can find his missing love Daydon. He and Jack make it to an ancient ruined site and find Selina and the hooded stranger who turns to be a transformed and tortured Daydon who begs Hamilton to end her life. They fight and Daydon is defeated but Selina escapes. The PSI army attacks Terra Verte. Hamilton makes it to the city where he and his group battles to liberate the city. They battle Selina again which ends with Jack drowning her in a fountain. They activate the city water defense system which opens the water gates and drowns the invading forces in sea water. The group infiltrates Prescott's HQ and the final battle begins. Prescott reveals his powerful weapon, a mech, and fights Hamilton. Hamilton destroys the mech but Prescott lifts the machine up and throws it away after taking a large dose of his own serum. He then tries to kill Hamilton. Hamilton defeats Prescott and his corpse turns to ash. The group saves Akahando and leave in their Airship finally ending Prescott's reign of terror and bringing peace to America.

== Development ==
Group W's logo, used before the merger with CBS. The game's cover uses Ray Larabie's freeware font "Anklepants", which borrows heavily from the Group W typeface introduced in 1963, for their logos and on-air imaging.

The game originally started as an Unreal Tournament 2004 mod, and was entered into Epic Games' first Make Something Unreal contest. It came in second place for best Total Conversion game modification. The retail version retains much of its mod's gameplay, including third-person gameplay, acrobatic moves and spirit vision.

A demo was scheduled to be released on the PlayStation Network and Xbox Live Marketplace in early January 2009 but that was never released.

The game was delayed numerous times from its original fall 2008 release window, with numerous release dates thereafter being given and then missed before finally being released in May–June 2009.

The game's cover uses Ray Larabie's freeware font "Anklepants", which borrows heavily from the Group W typeface introduced in 1963, for their logos and on-air imaging (though the game was released in 2009, 11 years after Group W went defunct, and before it was merged into CBS, which itself was later merged the original incarnation of Viacom when CBS and Viacom merged).

== Promotion ==
A console design contest was made available for US residents. Contestants could submit their designs using any available design tool. The prize was a limited edition PlayStation 3 with a steampunk design.

== Reception ==
Reception

Aggregate score
Aggregator	Score		
Aggregator	PC	PS3	Xbox 360
Metacritic	41/100	36/100	36/100

Review scores
Publication	Score		
Publication	PC	PS3	Xbox 360
Destructoid	N/A	N/A	5/10
Edge	3/10	3/10	3/10
Eurogamer	N/A	N/A	3/10
Game Informer	N/A	3/10	3/10
GameSpot	3.5/10	3.5/10	3.5/10
GameZone	N/A	N/A	3/10
IGN	2.5/10	2.5/10	2.5/10
Official Xbox Magazine (UK)	N/A	N/A	6/10
PC Gamer (UK)	46%	N/A	N/A
PlayStation: The Official Magazine	N/A	1.5/5	N/A
Teletext GameCentral	N/A	3/10	N/A

Damnation received "unfavorable" reviews on all platforms according to the review aggregation website Metacritic. IGN reviewer Greg Miller said that the graphics, voice acting, and gunplay are terrible: "Avoid this game at all costs". Andy Hartup wrote in Xbox World that the game was "[o]ne of the worst shooters of this generation. The clue really is in the name..."

Junglist and Bajo, from the Australian gaming show Good Game, said that they enjoyed the environment and exploring but felt the A.I. was overpowered and unintelligent.
