= C.S.A.: The Confederate States of America =

2004 American mockumentary film directed by Kevin Willmott

- Theatrical release poster
- Directed by: Kevin Willmott
- Written by: Kevin Willmott
- Produced by: Rick Cowan; Ollie Hall; Sean Blake; Victoria Goetz; Benjamin Meade; Andrew Herwitz; Marvin Voth
- Starring: Rupert Pate; Evamarii Johnson; Larry Peterson; LaMont Collins, Jr.
- Narrated by: Charles Frank
- Cinematography: Matt Jacobson
- Edited by: Sean Blake; David Gramly
- Music by: Erich L. Timkar; Kelly Werts
- Production company: Hodcarrier Films
- Distributed by: IFC Films
- Release dates: January 17, 2004 (Sundance); October 7, 2005 (Limited release, United States); February 15, 2006 (Wide release, United States)
- Running time: 89 minutes
- Country: United States
- Language: English
- Box office: $744,165

C.S.A.: The Confederate States of America is a 2004 American satirical mockumentary film written and directed by Kevin Willmott. It is an account of an alternate history, in which the Confederacy wins the American Civil War and establishes a new Confederate States of America that incorporates the majority of the Western Hemisphere, including the former contiguous United States, the "Golden Circle", the Caribbean, and South America. Primarily detailing significant political and cultural events of Confederate history from its founding until the early 2000s, this viewpoint is used to satirize real issues and events, and to shed light on the continuing existence of racism against Black Americans.

The film premiered at the 2004 Sundance Film Festival, and was released in the United States as a limited release on selected Southern United States theatres on October 7, 2005, then received a wide release on February 15, 2006, by IFC Films. It received positive reviews.

== Plot ==
During the Civil War, Judah P. Benjamin, CSA Secretary of State and chief advisor to Jefferson Davis, successfully convinces France and Britain to aid the CSA militarily by framing the issue as one of "states' rights", not slavery. The combined troops defeat the Union at Gettysburg, and Ulysses S. Grant surrenders to Robert E. Lee in 1865. Abraham Lincoln attempts to flee the country with the help of Harriet Tubman, who disguises him in blackface, but the two are arrested by CSA troops in Michigan. Tubman is executed, while Lincoln is convicted of war crimes, imprisoned, and eventually exiled to Canada, where he stays until his death in 1905. The CSA annexes the North, Dixie becomes the nation's national anthem, and northern cities are burned and pillaged.

Lee becomes remorseful when seeing the atrocities and advocates for emancipation, but Virginia congressman and wealthy slaveowner John Ambrose Fauntroy successfully campaigns for the continuation of slavery. The Davis Plan, which is overseen by Fauntroy and quickly revives the institution of slavery in the former Union, levies an income tax on all non-slaveowning northerners. Slave status is legally extended to all individuals of mixed-race descent per the one-drop rule. William Lloyd Garrison convinces 20,000 abolitionists to flee for Canada, including Harriet Beecher Stowe, Walt Whitman, Henry David Thoreau, Mark Twain, Wendell Phillips, and Susan B. Anthony, who will help lead Canada toward women's suffrage in 1912. After a slave murders two white children and runs away, doctor Samuel A. Cartwright uses his theory of drapetomania to encourage torture for potential runaway slaves. Fauntroy receives the Democratic presidential nomination in 1880, but suffers a stroke and dies two years later. Nevertheless, his family will become such a powerful influence in CSA politics that many will consider them royalty.

In response to a gaunt period known as the "American Holocaust", Garrison and Frederick Douglass form the NAACP (National Association for the Advancement for Chattel People), which smuggles hundreds of slaves into Canada. The CSA demands Canada return all 'property', but Douglass's rhetoric sways Parliament into refusing, though many Confederates still demand reparations to this day. Native Americans are crushed in the 30-year Plains Indian Wars and their children sent to boarding schools; meanwhile, Congress in the 1890s legalizes the enslavement of Asian immigrants and bans all religions not based in Christianity (Catholicism will fall under Christianity after 'much debate'). Davis, close to death, strongly opposes the act because of Sec. Benjamin and his pleas convince young congressman Fauntroy II to add a clause allowing a small number of Jews to stay on the 'reservation' of Long Island. Literature of the time aims to reconcile and romanticize relations between the North and South by minimizing the desire to preserve slavery and the suffering of the enslaved in favor of the 'heroism' of both sides' white soldiers and the quest for the states' freedom.

Seeking a 'tropical empire', the CSA conquers the Caribbean in 1900, then Mexico. The former reinstates a slave-based plantation economy, while the latter institutes apartheid. The CSA then exposes existing divisions within South America to conquer the entire continent, marking its bloodiest event since the Civil War. 'Manifest destiny' becomes associated with a God-given right to dominate the entire world, not just the American West. By 1929, the entire Western Hemisphere, except Canada (and potentially Alaska), is under CSA rule, with the captured territories now named Mexican America, Southern America, and the Confederate Islands.

The Great Depression cripples the Confederate economy and sends the nation into isolationism until Fauntroy II, now a senator, revives the slave trade with African nations, though it is implied these nations only participate on the basis that the CSA will now otherwise leave them alone. Meanwhile, the CSA builds friendly relations with Adolf Hitler, who invites the nation to collaborate with him to implement the Final Solution, though Secretary of State Fauntroy III tries to convince Hitler to enslave the Jews instead. While Hitler declines, he nonetheless becomes a good friend of the Fauntroy family. While the CSA remains neutral regarding World War II's European Theatre, they are the ones who bomb Japan on December 7, 1941, not the other way round, as they deem its empire a threat to CSA territorial expansion. The casualty rate of the Pacific War is so high that the enslaved are recruited to fight, starting with enslaved Japanese-Americans in the west and later extending to African-Americans under the promise of freedom. The 129th Fighting Bucks are assigned to the war's most dangerous missions and fight valiantly, but once the CSA declares victory, they are returned to their owners.

The CSA enjoys a peaceful postwar boom until the John Brown Underground, a splinter group of the NAACP, wages 'a war against slavery' by attacking major cities across the CSA. The CSA demands that all JBU members be extradited, which Canada refuses. The events spur a nationwide paranoia against abolitionism and the construction of the Cotton Curtain, a wall against the Canadian border. When the JBU supposedly assassinates Fauntroy IV, the CSA launches an airstrike on Canada. The Summit Nations institutes a global embargo on the CSA to prevent further aggression against Canada (only South Africa remains an ally), causing the economy to contract and nationwide support of slavery to dip to less than 30%.

As a result, Republican John F. Kennedy defeats Democrat Richard M. Nixon in the 1960 presidential election, becoming the first president from the North since the CSA's founding. He promises a progressive new frontier for the CSA likely to include emancipation and women's suffrage, but is too distracted with international affairs, notably a cold war with Canada and the Vietnam War (which is deemed an 'expansion effort'), to enact many of these reforms. Meanwhile, Black Canadians prosper, and Canada becomes a hotbed of Black-inspired literature, music, and art, with talents like Elvis Presley, James Baldwin and Richard Wright residing there rather than being censored and arrested in the CSA, whose culture has evolved little beyond 'government-inspired propaganda'. Canada also outperforms the CSA in the Olympic Games thanks to Black athletes. As close as social reform may seem, JFK's assassination shatters all progress, and violent slave rebellions flare up in L.A. and Newark.

The Family Values Initiative of the 1980s and early 1990s, sponsored by Ronald Reagan's Commerce Secretary Fauntroy V, attempts to steer the nation's moral track back toward trust in slavery, patriarchy, and heterosexuality, and modernizes the institution of slavery with innovations such as online slave shopping, which popularizes slave ownership amongst younger generations and generates $500,000,000 for the CSA annually. Fauntroy uses the momentum to launch a bid for the 2002 Democratic presidential nomination and invites BBS interviewers to boost his public image. However, the reporters are secretly given instructions to a rendezvous organized by JBU leader "Big Sam". There, the reporters are met by Horace, whose family has been enslaved by the Fauntroys for generations. He reveals on tape that Fauntroy I had an affair with Horace's great-great-grandmother, and that Fauntroy V is a descendant of the affair, making him mixed. The tape is published, and Fauntroy denies the accusations, claiming, "my great-granddaddy did not have sexual relations with that woman", but declines to submit to a DNA test. The allegations cost Fauntroy the election, and he commits suicide on December 12, 2002. A mandatory DNA test is ordered and released days later; the results prove negative.

== Cast ==
- Rupert Pate as Sherman Hoyle, a Confederate American historian who speaks highly of Confederate values.
- Evamarii Johnson as Patricia Johnson, an African-Canadian historian whose viewpoints focus on the slaves and minorities oppressed by the Confederate regime.
- Larry Peterson as Senator John Ambrose Fauntroy V, a descendant of Confederate senator John Ambrose Fauntroy I and Democratic candidate for the presidency in 2002.
- Charles Frank as the documentary's narrator
- Steve Jasen as the voice of Abraham Lincoln
- Arlo Kasper as Old Abraham Lincoln
- Kevin McKinney as Blackface Abraham Lincoln
- Joyce Jefferson as the voice of Harriet Tubman
- Will Averill as Blackface Harriet Tubman
- Brian Paulette as Jefferson Davis
- Lauralei Linzay as Varina Davis
- Sean Blake as Adolf Hitler
- Glenn Q. Pierce as the voice of Robert E. Lee
- Marvin Voth as the voice of Walt Whitman
- John Staniunas as the voice of William Lloyd Garrison
- Greg Funk as the voice of Wendell Phillips
- Kevin Willmott as the voice of Frederick Douglass

== Production ==
Kevin Wilmott began production on the film with a funding from the National Black Programming Consortium (NBPC) and wrote its first draft in 1997.

Willmott, who had earlier written a screenplay about abolitionist John Brown, told interviewers he was inspired to write the story after seeing an episode of Ken Burns' 1990 television documentary miniseries The Civil War. It was produced by Hodcarrier Films.

The film was filmed in Humboldt, Newton and Lawrence cities in Kansas, with a cast and crew coming from the U.S. states of Kansas, Missouri and Iowa as well as Colombia.

== Release ==
An earlier version of the film premiered on February 21, 2003, at Liberty Hall in Lawrence, Kansas, while the film premiered for the second time, at the Sundance Film Festival on January 17, 2004.

In January 2004, after the film's premiere at the Sundance Film Festival, IFC Films acquired the distribution rights to the film in the United States.

The film received a limited theatrical release in some Southern cities on October 7, 2005, and later received a wide theatrical release on February 15, 2006.

=== Home media ===
The film was released on DVD by IFC Films (distributed by Genius Products) on August 8, 2006.

== Reception ==
The film grossed $744,165 worldwide in limited release.

On Rotten Tomatoes the film has an approval rating of 80% based on reviews from 66 critics. On Metacritic the film has a score of 62 out of 100 based on reviews from 22 critics, indicating "generally favorable" reviews. Most critics were intrigued by the film's premise, but some found the execution to be lacking primarily due to a low budget. In 2018 James Berardinelli wrote: "The movie is ultimately more interesting in satire than the presentation of a legitimate alternate timeline. This doesn't invalidate C.S.A.'s approach but it limits its effectiveness as a sort of Twilight Zone look at the last 150 years."

== See also ==
- American Civil War alternate histories
- List of films featuring slavery
- The Domination
- Death of a President
