= Peter G. Tsouras =

American writer

- Born: April 24, 1948 (age 78)
- Writing career
- Genre: Military alternative history
- Military career
- Allegiance: United States
- Branch: United States Army
- Rank: Lieutenant colonel

Peter G. Tsouras is a military historian and author. A Greek-American, he served in the United States Army and retired with the rank of lieutenant colonel. He served in armor, military intelligence, and civil affairs assignments. He currently works as a senior analyst with the Battelle Corporation and resides in Alexandria, Virginia. He has written extensively in the field of military alternative history.

== Selected works ==
=== Author ===
- Alexander: Invincible King of Macedonia
- Britannia's Fist: From Civil War to World War - An Alternate History
- A Rainbow of Blood: The Union in Peril
- Bayonets, Balloons, & Ironclads: Britain and France Take Sides with the South
- Changing Orders: The Evolution of the World's Armies, 1945 to the Present
- Disaster at D-Day: The Germans Defeat the Allies, June 1944
- Disaster at Stalingrad: An Alternate History
- Gettysburg: An Alternate History
- The 'Great Patriotic War': The Illustrated History of the Soviet Union at War With Germany, 1941-1945
- Hancock
- Montezuma: Warlord of the Aztecs ISBN 1-57488-822-6
- United States Army: A Dictionary
- Warlords of the Ancient Americas: Central America
- Warlords of Ancient Mexico: How the Mayans and Aztecs Ruled for More Than a Thousand Years

=== Editor ===
- Anvil of War: German Generalship on the Eastern Front
- Battle Of The Bulge: Hitler's Alternate Scenarios
- Civil War Quotations: In the Words of the Commanders
- Cold War Hot: Alternative Decisions of the Cold War
- Dixie Victorious: An Alternate History of the Civil War
- Fighting in Hell: the German Ordeal on the Eastern Front
- The Greenhill Dictionary of Military Quotations
- Hitler Triumphant: Alternate Decisions [Histories] of World War II
- Operation Just Cause: U.S. Intervention in Panama (co-edited with Bruce W. Watson)
- Panzers on the Eastern Front: General Erhard Raus and His Panzer Divisions in Russia, 1941-1945
- Rising Sun Victorious: The Alternative History of How the Japanese Won the Pacific War
- Third Reich Victorious: Alternate Decisions of World War II
- Warrior's Words: A Quotation Book - From Sesostris III to Schwarzkopf, 1871 B.C.-1991 A.D.
