= Point of divergence =

Moment defining an alternate history

In alternate history fiction, a point of divergence is the moment when an alternate world's history diverges from our own, creating the alternate history. It is sometimes referred to as a nexus point or change-point. In science fiction, especially in time travel fiction, it is sometimes referred to as a Jonbar hinge or Jonbar point.

== Origin of Jonbar hinge ==
The term Jonbar hinge is derived from the Jack Williamson novel The Legion of Time (serialized 1938, collected 1952). It refers to one action from its character John Barr, whose picking up of one of two objects (a magnet or a pebble) is a major turning point in history: choosing one will lead to a utopian civilization named Jonbar, while the other to the tyranny of the state of Gyronchi.

This crucial moment (about which other characters are forewarned and must act), is thus a "Jonbar point" in the novel's timeline, a forking-place upon which hinges the rest of its history.

The terms Jonbar hinge and Jonbar point were initially more popular, even outside of science fiction, but they have declined in use as the popularity of alternate history fiction has increased, the genre has moved away from being seen as just a subgenre of science fiction, and Williamson's novel became increasingly forgotten.

== Characteristics ==
Point of divergence often refers to small undistinguished events that had an important effect on history, but time travel caused the outcome of the choice or event to be changed and to lead to a different future or to an alternate history. It can, however, refer to any kind of change in history without having to deal with time travel, as Paul Di Filippo used the term when he reviewed S. M. Stirling's In the Courts of the Crimson Kings. In Michael Chabon's The Yiddish Policemen's Union the jonbar hinge was the death of the main opponent to the passing of the King-Havenner Bill, which would have allowed Jewish refugees to settle in Alaska. The jonbar hinge in Bring the Jubilee, Ward Moore's 1953 novel of American Civil War alternative history, is the Confederate occupation of Little Round Top minutes before the Union's attempt, which leads to Lee's victory at the 1863 Battle of Gettysburg.

The term is also used in describing an important upcoming event or decision, that humanity will need to make.

== See also ==
- Alien space bats
- Butterfly effect
- Counterfactual history
- For Want of a Nail
