= The Guns of the South =

1992 novel by Harry Turtledove

- 1997 edition cover
- Author: Harry Turtledove
- Cover artist: Tom Stimpson
- Genre: Science fiction Alternate history
- Published: September 22, 1992
- Publisher: Ballantine
- Publication place: United States
- Media type: Print (hardback and paperback)
- Pages: 561
- ISBN: 978-0-345-38468-3
- OCLC: 26096611
- Dewey Decimal: 813/.54 20
- LC Class: PS3570.U76 G86 1992

The Guns of the South is an alternate history science fiction novel set during the American Civil War by Harry Turtledove. It was released in the United States on September 22, 1992.

The story deals with a group of time traveling members of the Afrikaner Weerstandsbeweging (AWB) from an imagined 21st-century South Africa, who supply Robert E. Lee's Army of Northern Virginia with AK-47s and other advanced technology, medicine and intelligence. Their intervention results in a Confederate victory in the war. Afterwards, however, the AWB members discover that their ideas for the Confederate States and Lee's are not one and the same as they believed and the general and the men of the South have a violent falling out with the white supremacists from the future.

== Plot ==
=== Alteration of the Civil War ===
In January 1864, the Confederate States is on the verge of losing the Civil War against the United States. Men with strange accents and oddly-mottled clothing approach Confederate General Robert E. Lee at the headquarters of the Army of Northern Virginia. They demonstrate a rifle far superior to all other firearms of the time, based on advanced technology unknown to Confederate engineers. They offer to supply the Confederate Army with the rifles, which they refer to as AK-47s. The men, who call their organization "America Will Break" (or "AWB"), establish a base in Rivington in Nash County, North Carolina, along with offices in the Confederate capital of Richmond, Virginia.

The AWB continues to provide the Confederacy with advanced intelligence, technology, and medicine, including nitroglycerine for Lee's heart condition. When Lee questions their leader, Andries Rhoodie, he provides a partially true explanation that the AWB are Neo-Nazi ultra-nationalists from post-apartheid South Africa who have traveled back in time from the year 2014 to change the outcome of the Civil War. They further claim that white supremacy has not endured and that blacks have marginalized whites. Lee is told that President Abraham Lincoln will act as a tyrant during his second term and that his successor, Thaddeus Stevens, will continue his work to ensure that blacks will dominate the former Confederacy, and that blacks will take over other countries, including the United Kingdom.

The AWB trains and equips the Confederate Army of Northern Virginia who drives the Union's forces out of Virginia. In a surprise night attack, they capture Washington and end the Civil War. Lincoln refuses to flee the capital during their advance and appears on the White House lawn, where he surrenders to Lee. The United Kingdom and France recognize the Confederacy, and Lincoln is forced to accept the Confederate victory.

=== Events after Confederate victory ===
The two sides hold formal peace negotiations in Richmond, with Lee serving as one of the commissioners, to resolve territorial disputes and Confederate demands for reparations. At the same time, the Union's defeat in the war leads to a four-way split in the 1864 presidential election, with Lincoln losing to New York Governor Horatio Seymour.

Following the election, the Union agrees to pay reparations and relinquishes its claims to the Indian Territory. In return, the Confederacy renounces its claims to Maryland, West Virginia, New Mexico, and Arizona. At Lee's suggestion, the border states of Kentucky and Missouri hold referendums to determine their status: Kentucky votes to join the Confederacy, while Missouri remains in the Union.

Many enslaved people freed by Union forces during the war, including Union veterans, continue to resist Confederate forces after the Union's surrender. This generates significant concern among Confederate civilians and provokes strong reactions from troops tasked with suppressing the resistance, particularly Nathan Bedford Forrest and his forces. Lee, already skeptical of slavery and respectful of the service of the United States Colored Troops during the war, becomes convinced that the continuation of slavery is both morally indefensible and impractical. Despite threats from Rhoodie and the AWB, he does not conceal these views.

Later, with the encouragement and support of Jefferson Davis, who is ineligible for re-election after serving a six-year term, Lee runs for President in the 1867 Confederate States presidential election on a pro-abolition Confederate Party ticket, with Senator Albert Gallatin Brown of Mississippi as his running mate. The Rivington faction puts their resources behind the pro-slavery Patriot Party ticket of General Nathan Bedford Forrest and Senator Louis Wigfall of Texas, but Lee wins a narrow victory over Forrest.

=== AWB's betrayal ===
Soon after the election, Lee receives a history book stolen from the Rivington men. The book describes the Civil War and the outcome that would have occurred without the AWB's intervention. Lee confronts AWB leader Rhoodie, using the book as evidence of his dishonesty, and compares his fanaticism to that of John Brown. In response, Rhoodie promises to demonstrate the AWB's true intentions.

AWB operatives attempt to assassinate Lee at his 1868 inauguration, resulting in the deaths of his wife, the Vice President, and many others. Police forces subsequently seize AWB offices in Richmond following a fierce engagement. Lee enters the stronghold and discovers various advanced technologies along with books documenting the decline of institutionalized racism after 1865 and efforts to improve race relations into the 21st century. He presents these materials to the Confederate Congress in an effort to demonstrate the long-term global rejection of slavery and racism and to support his proposal for gradual abolition.

Confederate forces then lay siege to Rivington, engaging AWB personnel who are equipped with modern advanced weaponry and sustaining heavy casualties. The Confederate infantry destroys the AWB's time machine during the fighting and captures the town after breaching its defenses. AWB members unable to return to their own time surrender.

In Richmond, the Confederate Congress narrowly passes President Lee's gradual emancipation bill. Confederate pharmacists replicate the nitroglycerin pills introduced by the AWB, and Lee expresses hope that he will live long enough to witness the effects of emancipation. Several stranded Afrikaners agree to assist the Confederacy in reproducing aspects of their 21st-century technology, allowing Lee to counter the Union's industrial capacity and its use of replicated AK-47-style rifles. Although the Confederacy maintains neutrality during a conflict initiated by the Union against the British Empire following an invasion of Canada, Lee expresses concern that the Union may later pursue a war of retaliation. He remains confident, however, that the Confederacy will retain a technological advantage for decades.

== Reception ==
Kirkus gave a positive review, saying "Readers willing to wink at the time travel will find a well-researched and well-written account of a nation that didn't happen. Literate rebs will read it again and again and again."

== Award ==
The book won the John Esten Cooke Award for Southern Fiction in 1993.

== See also ==
- American Civil War alternate histories
- A Rebel in Time, another Civil War alternate history involving time travel and a racist sending advanced weapons to the Confederacy, published in 1983
- "Still Valley", a The Twilight Zone episode focusing on the Civil War.
- Southern Victory, a series of books by Turtledove focused on a Confederate victory and its aftermath.
- Transdimensional Teenage Mutant Ninja Turtles in 1989 featured an adventure on pages 96–99 called "Doc Feral's Dynamic Dimensional Doohickey" where Feral's rebellious assistant Louis Evans sold four modern machine guns to the Confederate army and planned to sell them twenty more
