= List of fiction set in ancient Rome =

== Historical novels arranged by the period of their setting ==
=== Rome as a Kingdom ===
If you know of works set in the pre-Republican era, please expand this section.

- Founding Fathers (1959) by Alfred Duggan. Originally titled Children of the Wolf, this novel tells the story of King Romulus and the founding of Rome through the eyes of a variety of characters who come to the new city.
- Roma (2007) by Steven Saylor. According to the author's website, the book covers part of Rome's early history.

=== Early Republic (before 264 BC) ===
If you know of works set in the Early Republic, please expand this section.

- Roma, published March 6, 2007, by Steven Saylor. According to the author's website, the book covers part of Rome's early history.
- The Etruscan by Mika Waltari. Part of the story is set on the first few years of the Republic.
- Traitors’ Legion (Ace G-532,1963) by Jay Scotland, a swashbuckler about a disgraced legion, set in Hannibal's time.

=== Middle Republic (264–133 BC) ===
If you know of works set in the Middle Republic, please expand this section.

- Roma, published March 6, 2007, by Steven Saylor. According to the author's website, the book covers part of Rome's Republican history.
- Scipio: A Novel, published March 1998 by Ross Leckie. This is the second book in a loose trilogy about the Second Punic War.
- Scipio trilogy by Santiago Posteguillo (the Punic Wars general Publius Cornelius Scipio)
1. Africanus, el hijo del cónsul
2. Las legiones malditas
3. La traición de Roma
- Of Merchants & Heroes, published 2008 by Paul Waters. Set at the end of the 3rd century BC, about the life of a fictional Roman called Marcus. In the novel Marcus becomes involved in the war against Philip V of Macedon, which was led by Titus Quinctius Flamininus, who later became Consul and is a major character in the story.
- "Salammbô", published 1977 by Gustave Flaubert. 240 BC. The novel is set before and during the Mercenary War, an uprising of mercenaries in the employ of Carthage in the 3rd century BC.
- "The Shield of Rome", published 2011 by William Kelso. 216 BC. The novel is set during "Rome's finest hour" after the battle of Cannae when Hannibal threatens the very existence of the Republic.
- "The Fortune of Carthage", published 2012 by William Kelso. 207 BC. The novel is set during the 2nd Punic War and covers Hasdrubal Barca's attempt to link up with the Carthaginian army of his brother Hannibal.
- "Rome: Destroy Carthage", published 2013 by David Gibbins. 146 BC. The novel was written to promote the strategy game "Rome 2 Total War" and is set during the 3nd Punic War and covers the siege and utter destruction of Carthage.

=== Late Republic (after 132 BC) ===
- Viriato by João Aguiar (late 2nd, early 1st century BC, Viriathus)
- The Bow of Heaven (2011) by Andrew Levkoff, a novel of events leading up to the battle of Carrhae, and the triumvir responsible for one of the greatest defeats suffered by Republican Rome, Marcus Licinius Crassus
- Young Caesar (1958) by Rex Warner
- Imperium and Lustrum (novel) by Robert Harris, the first two volumes of a trilogy of fictionalized biography told by his slave, later freedman, Tiro depicting Cicero's rise to the consulship in 63 BC and subsequent role in the final days of the Republic.
- A Pillar of Iron (1965) by Taylor Caldwell, a fictionalized biography of Cicero.
- Imperial Caesar (1960) also by Rex Warner
- The Ides of March (1948) by Thornton Wilder, culminating in Caesar's assassination.
- Caesar, Antony by Allan Massie
- Freedom, farewell! by Phyllis Bentley.
- The Roma Sub Rosa series by Steven Saylor is set in the later years of the Republic and the beginning of the Augustan period.
- Roma, published March 6, 2007, by Steven Saylor. According to the author's website, the book covers part of Rome's early history.
- The Emperor Series (2003–2013), by Conn Iggulden, Julius Caesar's life
- The Last King: Rome's Greatest Enemy (2005) by Michael Curtis Ford. The career of Mithridates VI (134–63 BC)
- The Masters of Rome series by Colleen McCullough. Beginning before the birth of Julius Caesar to after his death, it details the self-immolation of the Roman Republic.
- Spartacus by Howard Fast
- Spartacus by Lewis Grassic Gibbon
- Three's Company (1958) by Alfred Duggan. The career of Lepidus, triumvir with Octavian and Marcus Antonius after the death of Julius Caesar.
- Winter Quarters (1956) by Alfred Duggan. Two Gauls in the time of Julius Caesar, one of whom is under a curse from the Mother Goddess, whose worship he finds throughout the Roman world.
- The Conquered by Naomi Mitchison (1923). Gaul & the Gallic Wars 1st century BC
- Beric the Briton: A Story of the Roman Invasion (1893) by G. A. Henty
- Imperial Caesar (1960) also by Rex Warner

=== Early/High Empire (27 BC to AD 192) ===
- Someday Never Comes by Mk Kayem
- An Imaginary Life by David Malouf. A fictional account of the poet Ovid's exile from Rome.
- The Last World by Christoph Ransmayr. Another Ovid-related novel.
- The Quest For the Lost Roman Legions by Tony Clunn, Battle of the Teutoburg Forest, with his account of his discovery of the battlefield
- Persona Non Grata, Terra Incognita, Medicus and Caveat Emptor, a series of mysteries featuring the "reluctant sleuth" Gaius Petreius Ruso by Ruth Downie, set around 120 AD.
- Three Legions series by Rosemary Sutcliff set in Roman Britain c. 130 AD. The three novels consist of The Eagle of the Ninth (1954), The Silver Branch (1957), and The Lantern Bearers (1959). The three were first collected in one volume as Three Legions in 1980.
- Empire published August 31, 2010, by Steven Saylor. The book follows two families through Rome's Imperial history, from the reign of Augustus to the reign of Hadrian. The sequel to Roma.
- Vespasian series by Robert Fabbri. The series details the early career and rise to power of Vespasian.

==== The Julio-Claudian Dynasty ====
- The Nero Prediction by Humphry Knipe
- The Roman (1964) by Mika Waltari
- The Tribune: A Novel of Ancient Rome by Patrick Larkin
- Augustus by John Williams
- Augustus, Tiberius, Caligula and Nero's Heirs by Allan Massie
- Empire: The Novel of Imperial Rome by Steven Saylor
- Let the Emperor Speak: A novel of Caesar Augustus by Allan Massie, Doubleday & Company, Inc, New York, 1987 (First published in Great Britain in 1986 by the Bodley Head as Augustus). Also by this author: Caesar, Anthony, Tiberius, Caligula and Nero's Heirs.
- Pretender by Lion Feuchtwanger

Books about early Christians or Jesus include:

- Ben-Hur: A Tale of the Christ (1880) by Lew Wallace; famously made into a film starring Charlton Heston; set in the reign of Tiberius in Judaea, the Mediterranean, and Rome. Epilogues carry the story into the reign of Nero
- I Am a Barbarian (1967, written 1941) by Edgar Rice Burroughs; the fictionalized memoirs of Caligula's slave.
- A Voice in the Wind (1994) by Francine Rivers; the story of Hadassah, a Christian slave taken from Jerusalem and taken to Rome in the time of Titus and his father Mark of the Lion Trilogy book 1
- An Echo in the Darkness (1995) by Francine Rivers; the continuing story of Hadassah and Marcus. Mark of the Lion Trilogy book 2
- As Sure as the Dawn (1995) by Francine Rivers; the continuing story of Atretes. Mark of the Lion Trilogy book 3
- The Robe (1942), by Lloyd C. Douglas, set in the same period as Ben-Hur; like Ben-Hur, more famous as a film.

Books about Claudius or set in his reign include:

- I, Claudius (1934) and its sequel, Claudius the God (1935), by Robert Graves. The classic and influential dramatised account of the life of the emperor Claudius, made into a popular TV series (see below).
- The Eagle series by Nigerian-born British novelist Simon Scarrow. The first book Under the Eagle (part of the Eagle series) was published 2000 by Simon Scarrow. Story of Roman invasion of Britain, featuring a young Vespasian. Other books in the series include The Eagle's Conquest (2001 set in 42 AD (introducing Boudicca at the end); When the Eagle Hunts (2002) set in 44 AD. Other books in the series include The Eagle and the Wolves (2003), The Eagle's Prey (2004), The Eagle's Prophecy (2005), The Eagle in the Sand (2006), and the forthcoming Centurion (January – 2008).

Books set in Nero's reign include:

- Beric the Briton, A Story of the Roman Invasion (1893) by G. A. Henty; the story of a Romanized Briton captured as a rebel and sent to Rome as a gladiator
- Quo Vadis (1895/1896), by Henryk Sienkiewicz set in the reign of Nero in 64 AD.
- The Flames of Rome by Paul L. Maier
- The Gladiator by Thames Williamson
- A Song for Nero (2003) by Tom Holt, writing as Thomas Holt.
- Nero, the Bloody Poet by Dezső Kosztolányi
- Imperial Governor (1968, reprinted 2002), George Shipway, the Icenii revolt under Boudicca.
- The Roman (1964) by Mika Waltari
- The Cleft by Doris Lessing is a book supposedly written by an historian during Nero's reign.
- Venator (2024) by A. M. Swink, the first in the Roman Equestrian series, which is set in Roman Britain just before the onset of the Boudican revolt.

==== The Flavian Dynasty ====
- Josephus Trilogy (1959), by Lion Feuchtwanger about Flavius Josephus, but set in Ancient Rome during Reign of Vespasianus and Titus
- The Course of Honour (1998), the first novel by Lindsey Davis (later author of the Marcus Didius Falco mysteries, which also take place during the reign on Vespasianus) narrates the history of Vespasian's imperial freedwoman mistress Antonia Caenis.
- The Light Bearer (1994), by Donna Gillespie tells the story of a Germanic female warrior who becomes a gladiator in Rome in the reign of Domitian.
- The Last Days of Pompeii by E.G.Bulwer-Lytton
- Pompeii by Robert Harris, tells the story of Pompeii and the volcano Vesuveus during the reign of Titus.
- The Jew of Rome by Lion Feuchtwanger

==== The Nervan-Antonian (Ulpio-Aelia) Dynasty ====
- Empress of the Seven Hills by Kate Quinn is set during the reign of Trajan.
- Lady of the Eternal City by Kate Quinn is set during the reign of Hadrian.
- Memoirs of Hadrian (1951) by Marguerite Yourcenar
- The Emperor by Georg Ebers, another fictitious biography of Hadrian
- A God Strolling in the Cool of the Evening (1994) by Mario de Carvalho, set mainly in Roman Lusitania
- Marius the Epicurean (1885) by Walter Pater

=== Middle Empire (AD 193–293) ===
- Family Favourites (1960), by Alfred Duggan; a tale of court life under the teenage emperor Elagabalus, as recounted by his personal bodyguard
- Heliogabalus or, the Crowned Anarchist (1934) by Antonin Artaud, a novelized biography of the teenage emperor Elagabalus, a powerful concoction of sexual excess, self-deification and terminal violence
- The Unconquered Sun by Ralph Dulin, follows the life of the emperor Aurelian and his wife
- Warrior Of Rome series by historian Harry Sidebottom, takes place in the years 238 to 264, mostly from 256 to 264, six books so far published
- Iron And Rust also by historian Harry Sidebottom, takes place before the Warrior Of Rome series

=== Late Empire: West (AD 293–457) ===
- Helena by Evelyn Waugh; follows the quest of the Empress Helena, a Christian and the mother of Emperor Constantine to uncover the remains of the cross upon which Christ was crucified.
- Julian (1964) by Gore Vidal, fictionalized biography of the emperor Julian the Apostate, who tried to revive Paganism
- The Last Legion: A Novel by Valerio Massimo Manfredi; fictionalized story of the emperor Romulus Augustulus and what might have happened to his surviving retinue.
- The Death of the Gods. Julian the Apostate (Russian: Смерть богов. Юлиан Отступник) by Dmitry Merezhkovsky in 1895.The novel tells the story of Roman Emperor Julian who during his reign (361–363) was trying to restore the cult of Olympian gods in Rome, resisting the upcoming Christianity.
- Eagle in the Snow (1970) by Wallace Breem; set in Britannia and Germania in the late 4th and early 5th century; features a Mithraic Roman general.
- The Little Emperors (1951) by Alfred Duggan. A succession of coups in late-Roman Britain.
- Gods And Legions: A Novel of the Roman Empire (2002) by Michael Curtis Ford
- The Sword of Attila: A Novel of the Last Years of Rome (2005) by Michael Curtis Ford
- The Fall of Rome: A Novel of a World Lost (2007) by Michael Curtis Ford
- Raptor (1993) by Gary Jennings is an historical novel set in the late 5th and early 6th centuries. It purports to be the memoirs of an Ostrogoth, Thorn, who has a secret.
- Threshold of Fire: A Novel of Fifth Century Rome (1966) by Hella Haasse
- Legionary (2011) by Gordon Doherty
- Legionary: Viper of the North (2012) by Gordon Doherty
- Legionary: Land of the Sacred Fire (2013) by Gordon Doherty
- Legionary: The Scourge of Thracia (2015) by Gordon Doherty
- Legionary: Gods & Emperors (2015) by Gordon Doherty
- Legionary: Empire of Shades (2017) by Gordon Doherty
- Legionary: The Blood Road (2018) by Gordon Doherty
- Legionary: Dark Eagle (2020) by Gordon Doherty
- Legionary: The Emperor's Shield (2023) by Gordon Doherty
- Legionary: Devotio (2025) by Gordon Doherty
- Legionary: Eagles in the Desert (2020) by Gordon Doherty
- Age of Attila: The Eagle & the Wolf (2026) by Gordon Doherty
- Sons of Rome (2020) by Gordon Doherty & S.J.A. Turney
- Masters of Rome (2021) by Gordon Doherty & S.J.A. Turney
- Gods of Rome (2021) by Gordon Doherty & S.J.A. Turney

=== Byzantine Empire (AD 457–1453) ===
- Anna of Byzantium, 1999
- Bélisaire
- Belisarius series by David Drake and Eric Flint
- Count Belisarius (1938), by Robert Graves, set in the 6th century, in the reign of Justinian
- The Dancing Bear (1972), by Peter Dickinson. Young adult.
- Justinian, a novel, by H N Turteltaub (Harry Turtledove), August 1998
- The Palaeologian Dynasty. The Rise and Fall of Byzantium
- Roma Eterna (2003), by Robert Silverberg
- A Struggle for Rome (1876), by Felix Dahn
- Tirant lo Blanch (finished posthumously by Martí Joan de Galba, published 1490), by Joanot Martorell
- Up the Line (1969), by Robert Silverberg
- Strategos: Born in the Borderlands (2011) by Gordon Doherty
- Strategos: Rise of the Golden Heart (2011) by Gordon Doherty
- Strategos: Island in the Storm (2011) by Gordon Doherty

== Unknown period ==
- Avventura nel primo secolo by Paolo Monelli
- Conscience of the King, The Little Emperors and Family Favourites by Alfred Duggan
- Antonia by Brenda Jagger
- The Tribune: A Novel of Ancient Rome by Patrick Larkin
- Hadrian's Wall: A Novel by William Dietrich
- The Centurion: A Novel (1986) by Jan de Hartog
- The Nero Prediction by Humphry Knipe

== Detective fiction ==
- Search the Seven Hills (The Quirinal Hill Affair) (1987) by Barbara Hambly
- The Roma Sub Rosa series (1991–2012) by Steven Saylor, starts with Roman Blood (1991); the books cover the period 92 BC to 46 BC.
- The Marcus Didius Falco series by Lindsey Davis, starts with The Silver Pigs; set in the reign of Vespasian.
- The SPQR series by John Maddox Roberts.
- The Marcus Corvinus (fictional character) series by David Wishart
- The Roman Mysteries young adults' detective/drama series by Caroline Lawrence
- The Caius Trilogy by German author Henry Winterfeld: Caius ist ein Dummkopf (Caius is an Idiot); Caius geht ein Licht auf (Caius has an Inspiration), and Caius in der Klemme (Caius in a Fix). The first part was published in English with the alternate title Detectives in Togas. The second was published in English with the alternate title Mystery of the Roman Ransom.
- The Eagle series by Simon Scarrow (see above)
- The Germanicus Mosaic series by Rosemary Rowe – set in later Roman Britain

== Science fiction/time travel novels ==
- Caesar's Bicycle (1997) (Timeline Wars series) by John Barnes
- Arria Marcella (1852) by Théophile Gautier set in 79 AD in Pompeii
- Household Gods (1999), by Judith Tarr and Harry Turtledove set in the reign of Marcus Aurelius
- The Time Travelling Cat and the Roman Eagle (2001) by Julia Jarman
- "Codex Alera" Jim Butcher's fantasy take on what happened to the Lost Roman Legion.

=== Alternate history ===
The following alternate history novels are set in fictional universes where Rome's struggle with Carthage went differently

- The Seven Hills (2005) by John Maddox Roberts
- Delenda Est by Poul Anderson
- Lest Darkness Fall (1939) by L. Sprague de Camp; a time-travelling American alters history, set in 535 AD.
- Agent of Byzantium by Harry Turtledove set in an alternate 14th century with no Islam.
- Hannibal's Children (2002) and its sequel The Seven Hills by John Maddox Roberts. A victorious Hannibal sends all the Romans into exile, but they found a new city and their descendants return for vengeance.

The following alternate history novels are set in fictional universes where the Roman Empire never fell, and has endured to the present day:

- Romanitas (2005), by Sophia McDougall
- Rome Burning (2006), sequel to Romanitas, by Sophia McDougall
- Roma Eterna, a 2003 novel by Robert Silverberg
- Warlords of Utopia by Lance Parkin
- Gunpowder Empire by Harry Turtledove
- The Aquiliad (1983), by Somtow Sucharitkul. Circa 50 AD. A light-hearted novel in which Roman legions discover America, battle the Aztecs, encounter Big Foot, and drive off flying saucers.
- Oebis (2002), by Scott Mackay. Romans return to a modern-day Earth to retake it from alien invaders who exiled them centuries ago and imposed a strange form of Christianity.
- The Germanicus trilogy, a collection of books by Kirk Mitchell.
- Emperor (2006), by Stephen Baxter. After a Celtic chieftain obeys an ancient prophecy, and sides with the invaders, the history of Roman Britain takes a different path. First in a series.
- INCEPTIO (2013) first in the ten book Roma Nova thriller series by Alison Morton where a remnant of the ancient empire has survived into the 21st century and is led by women.

== Comic books ==
- The Adventures of Alix (1948–now) series by Jacques Martin of which some titles are set in Rome and the Ancient World. This series has a spin-off, called The travels of Alix, that gives illustrated information on famous places and empires of the Ancient World during the Roman Era.
- Astérix (1959–now) series by René Goscinny (stories) and Albert Uderzo (illustrations). A tiny village in Gaul holds out against the Roman Army, and its doughtiest warriors meet all the famous Romans.
- Murena (1997–now) series by Jean Dufaux and Philippe Delaby
- Le Fléau des Dieux (2000–2006) series by Valérie Mangin and Aleksa Gajic. Science fiction set in a remote future

== Movies ==
- Quo Vadis – U.S. 1951 director Mervyn LeRoy
- The Robe – U.S. 1953 director Henry Koster
- Demetrius and the Gladiators – U.S. 1954 director Delmer Daves (sequel to The Robe)
- Jupiter's Darling – U.S. 1955 director George Sidney, based on a play by Robert E. Sherwood
- Ben-Hur – U.S. 1959 director William Wyler
- Spartacus – U.S. 1960 director Stanley Kubrick
- King of Kings – U.S. 1961 director Nicholas Ray
- Cleopatra – U.S. 1963 director Joseph L. Mankiewicz
- The Fall of the Roman Empire – U.S. 1964 director Anthony Mann
- The Greatest Story Ever Told – U.S. 1965 director George Stevens
- A Funny Thing Happened on the Way to the Forum – U.S. 1966 director Richard Lester
- Fellini Satyricon – Italy 1969 director Federico Fellini
- Jesus Christ Superstar – U.S. 1973 director Norman Jewison
- Sebastiane – UK 1976 director Derek Jarman
- Caligula – U.S. 1979 director Tinto Brass
- Monty Python's Life of Brian – U.K. 1979 director Terry Jones
- History of the World, Part I – U.S. 1981 director Mel Brooks
- The Last Temptation of Christ – U.S. 1988 director Martin Scorsese
- Titus – U.S. 1999 director Julie Taymor
- Gladiator – U.S. 2000 director Ridley Scott
- Quo Vadis – Polish/U.S. 2001 director Jerzy Kawalerowicz, remake of 1951 film
- King Arthur – U.S. 2004 director Antoine Fuqua
- The Passion of the Christ – U.S. 2004 director Mel Gibson
- The Nativity Story – U.S. 2006 director Catherine Hardwicke
- Agora – Spain 2009 director Alejandro Amenábar
- Centurion – UK 2010 director Neil Marshall
- The Eagle – UK 2011 director Kevin Macdonald

== Plays ==
- Joseph Addison
  - Cato
- Albert Camus
  - Caligula
- Pierre Corneille
  - Cinna
- Henrik Ibsen
  - Emperor and Galilean
- Ben Jonson
  - Sejanus, His Fall
- Heinrich von Kleist
  - Die Hermannsschlacht
- William Shakespeare
  - Titus Andronicus
  - Julius Caesar
  - Antony and Cleopatra
  - Coriolanus
  - Cymbeline
- Robert Sherwood
  - The Road to Rome (1927), on which a little-known 1955 film Jupiter's Darling was based.
- Stephen Sondheim
  - A Funny Thing Happened on the Way to the Forum

== Television ==
- I, Claudius
- Julius Caesar minisieries by Uli Edel
- Masada
- Mystery Science Theater 3000 (part of season 8)
- Plebs
- Pompeii: The Last Day a dramatized documentary
- The Roman Holidays
- Rome
- Spartacus miniseries by Robert Dornhelm (director)
- Spartacus: Blood and Sand
- Up Pompeii!
- Bread and Circuses (Star Trek: The Original Series)

== Video games ==
Video game	Year	Platform	Score
Ryse: Son of Rome	2013	Windows, Xbox One	60
Total War: Rome II	2013	Mac, Windows	76
Roman Empire	2013	Windows Phone, Windows	76
Gods & Heroes: Rome Rising	2011	Windows	50
Gladiator Begins	2010	PSP	59
Tournament of Legends	2010	Wii	45
Grand Ages: Rome	2009	Windows	72
Cradle of Rome	2008	Nintendo DS, Wii	63
Europa Universalis: Rome	2008	Windows, Mac	73
Imperium Romanum	2008	Windows	63
Caesar IV	2006	Windows	74
CivCity: Rome	2006	Windows	67
Glory of the Roman Empire	2006	Windows	66
Colosseum: Road to Freedom	2005	PlayStation 2	56
Imperivm: Great Battles of Rome	2005	Windows	
Legion Arena	2005	Mac, Windows	65
Shadow of Rome	2005	PlayStation 2	75
Spartan: Total Warrior	2005	PlayStation 2, GameCube, Xbox	74
Nemesis of the Roman Empire	2004		74
Rome: Total War	2004	Windows, Mac	92
Gladius	2003	GameCube, PlayStation 2, Xbox	82
Praetorians	2003	Windows	78
Celtic Kings: Rage of War	2002	Windows	82
Circus Maximus: Chariot Wars	2002	PlayStation 2, Xbox	67
Catechumen	2000	Windows	
Nethergate	1999	Mac, Windows	
Age of Empires: The Rise of Rome	1998	Windows	
Caesar III	1998	Mac, Windows	
The Settlers II	1996	Mac, MS-DOS, Nintendo DS	
SPQR: The Empire's Darkest Hour	1996	Windows	
Caesar II	1995	Mac, MS-DOS, Windows	
Walls of Rome	1993	MS-DOS	
Caesar I	1992	Amiga, Atari ST, MS-DOS	
Rome: Pathway to Power	1992	Amiga, MS-DOS	
Warrior of Rome II	1992	Genesis	
Warrior of Rome	1991	Genesis	
Centurion: Defender of Rome	1990	MS-DOS, Amiga, Genesis	
Legions of Death	1987	Amstrad CPC, Commodore 64, ZX Spectrum	
Annals of Rome	1986	Amiga, Amstrad CPC, Atari ST, Commodore 64, MS-DOS, ZX Spectrum	
Legionnaire	1982	Apple II, Atari 8-bit, Commodore 64	

== Works inspired by Roman history, or by works of fiction and non-fiction about Rome ==
=== Science fiction ===
- Empire of the Atom, by A. E. van Vogt, translates Graves' novel about Claudius (above) into a science fiction context.
- The Foundation series by Isaac Asimov, about the fall of a galactic empire, is derived from Gibbon's Decline and Fall of the Roman Empire.
- Dominic Flandry series by Poul Anderson, a space empire similarly inspired by Gibbon's history (and by Asimov) is decaying and about to collapse into a Long Night of barbarism; a heroic secret agent fights to stave off this fate.
- Julian Comstock by Robert Charles Wilson, about a post-apocalyptic America transformed into a neo-Roman Empire, and a high born youth who, like Julian the Apostate, fights the power of the Church.
- Bread and Circuses (Star Trek: The Original Series)
- Tarzan and the Lost Empire by Edgar Rice Burroughs, a surviving fragment of the Roman Empire is discovered hidden in a corner of 20th century Africa.
- In Philip K. Dick's VALIS ancient Rome is superimposed over the present (California in the 20th century) and the far future world of The Android Cried Me a River to reveal "the Empire" – a supra- or trans-temporal constant. Furthermore, it is often repeated that the empire never fell. Also the novel's protagonist is described as living in two spacetime-continua with one of the personalities presently living in ancient Rome. Ancient Rome is also described as to breaking through into the modern world and "real time" is speculated as to having ceased in 70 AD with Roman times still being present.

=== Comic books ===
- Leading Comics - in the 1940s, a series called "Nero Fox" (about a talking animal named Nero Fox, who was emperor of Rome) was published as a backup series in this comic title.
- Trigan Empire was a Science Fiction comic series telling of adventures on the planet Elekton with many similarities to the Roman Empire

== See also ==
- List of fiction set in ancient Greece
- List of historical fiction by time period
