= Rome Burning =

2007 novel by Sophia McDougall

- Part Two.
- Author: Sophia McDougall
- Language: English
- Genre: Alternate history novel
- Publisher: Orion Books
- Publication date: 2007
- Publication place: United Kingdom
- Media type: Print (Hardback & Paperback)
- Pages: 336 pp (first edition, hardback)
- ISBN: 0-7528-6079-8 (first edition, hardback)
- OCLC: 76851874
- Preceded by: Romanitas
- Followed by: Savage City

Rome Burning is the second book of Sophia McDougall's trilogy, following her debut novel, Romanitas, set in a world where the Roman Empire has survived to contemporary times.

== Plot ==
Three years after the events of Romanitas, the Roman Empire is on the brink of war with Nionia (Japan), and plagued by a sequence of mysterious wildfires. Marcus Novius, the young heir to the Roman throne is forced to take charge as Regent when the Emperor Faustus falls suddenly ill. Marcus attempts to recruit Varius as his advisor, but Varius, who is still haunted by the events of the first book (in which he lost his wife and was framed for murder and treason), refuses. While Marcus works to avoid a world war, his lover Una is intent on discovering the truth about his ambitious cousin Drusus's involvement in a conspiracy that almost claimed Marcus's life. Her brother Sulien finds himself caught up along with Varius in a disastrous attack on an arms factory at Veii, just outside Rome. After surviving this and saving Sulien's life, Varius decides to return to political life after all, but Sulien is left with many questions about what happened. Una exposes Drusus's involvement in the murders of Marcus's parents and Varius's wife, although not before he almost kills her.

Varius urges Marcus to have Drusus killed but Marcus is reluctant to begin his reign with an extra-judiciary killing, and is content to have Drusus tried for Una's attempted murder as there is no direct evidence for his other crimes. Drusus, however, has formed an alliance with a Roman general, Salvius, who releases Drusus from prison and urges the sickly Emperor Faustus to rethink his decision to allow Marcus so much power. Drusus, who has hitherto never felt much personal resentment of those who have stood in his way, has conceived a passionate hatred of Una, and tries to convince Faustus that she, Sulien, and Varius are a dangerous influence on Marcus.

Sulien's attempts to discover more about the explosion at Veii lead him to believe he was somehow targeted. Una accompanies Marcus to peace talks hosted by the Sinoan (Chinese) Empress in the Song capital of Bianjing (Kaifeng). Things go well at first although Una discovers the Nionians are developing a super-weapon. But someone seems intent on sabotaging the negotiations. One of the Nionian party is killed by a Roman assassin and Marcus is abruptly summoned home by Faustus, under effective arrest. This leaves the Nionian Prince Tadahito deeply suspicious about Rome's intentions. Before he is forced to leave, Marcus hands over Una and Varius as hostages to the Nionians, partly as a sign of good faith, but primarily in the hope of keeping them away from Drusus, who would almost certainly have them tortured or killed. From within Nionian custody, and with the help of the Sinoan Empress and the Nionian Princess, Una and Varius attempt to influence the global action to stop Drusus causing a war, but their efforts come at a personal cost, especially for Una.

== See also ==
- Agent of Byzantium
- Germanicus trilogy
- Gunpowder Empire
- Lest Darkness Fall
- Roma Eterna
- Romanitas (novel)
- Warlords of Utopia
