= The Crystal Empire (novel) =

1986 novel by L. Neil Smith

- Cover of the first edition
- Author: L. Neil Smith
- Language: English
- Genre: Alternate history
- Published: 1986
- Publication place: United States
- Media type: Print (paperback)

The Crystal Empire is a 1986 novel by American science fiction and alternate history writer L. Neil Smith. It is set in an alternate universe that shares with Kim Stanley Robinson's The Years of Rice and Salt, Robert Silverberg's The Gate of Worlds and Harry Turtledove's In High Places a point of divergence where the Black Death kills much more of Europe's population than it did in reality, opening the way for a Muslim conquest of Europe. The plague also decimates the Mongol Empire, allowing a Mughal power to arise in the Far East in its place.

== Plot summary ==
Sedrich Sedrichsohn is an outcast from a small community of Europeans who have fled the twin dangers of the Muslim invaders by establishing a colony on the East Coast of North America, practicing a cult derived both from Christianity and Wiccan beliefs. Among their tenets are the belief that Christ continues to suffer in Hell until the Last Judgement, and also the placing of blame for the plague on the use of forbidden technologies such as gunpowder. Journeying across the continent, Sedrichsohn eventually comes across a Sino-Aztec kingdom in the West, the Crystal Empire of the 'Han-Meshika', formed by the synthesis of Chinese refugees from the Plague with the native Aztec civilisation. This immensely technologically advanced power derives its scientific advantage from the use of psychic 'Dreamers' who, in a large facility on the equivalent of our world's Alcatraz Island, provide the Crystal Empire with glimpses of alternate universes and thereby stimulate its science (one example given is the adoption of the electric light-bulb as a consequence of a Dreamer's vision).

== Reception ==
The Crystal Empire was a finalist for the 1987 Prometheus Award.

Kirkus Reviews found it to be "impressively imagined but overambitious" and "(c)urious but uncompelling", faulting Smith for his "clotted writing" and "hard-to-visualize exposition." The Encyclopedia of Science Fiction called it "somewhat confused".
