= New Guernsey =

New Guernsey may refer to:

- Nendö Island, the largest of the Santa Cruz Islands, in Solomon Islands
- A fictional state in the video game Grand Theft Auto
- A fictional North American province in the novel The Two Georges
- A fictional location next to Gotham City in the television series Batman

== See also ==
- Guernsey, an island in the English Channel
- New Jersey, a US state
