= Divided States of America =

Divided States of America may refer to:

== Books ==
- Divided States of America: The Slash and Burn Politics of the 2004 Presidential Election by Larry J. Sabato
- The Divided States of America: What Liberals and Conservatives Get Wrong about Faith and Politics by Richard Land

== Music ==
- The Divided States of America – Laibach 2004 Tour, DVD by Laibach
- "Divided States of America" (The Script song), a song by The Script from the album Freedom Child

== Television ==
- "Divided States of America", a two-part television episode of the PBS show Frontline
- "Divided States of America", an episode of the television show American Race, hosted by Charles Barkley

== Other uses ==
- "President of the Divided States of America", cover caption describing president-elect Donald Trump who was selected as the Time Person of the Year in 2016

== See also ==
- The Disunited States of America, alternate history novel by Harry Turtledove
- The Divided States of Hysteria, comic book series by Howard Chaykin
- The United States of America, a country of 50 individual states united under a federal government
