= The Gate of Worlds =

1967 alternate history novel by Robert Silverberg

- First edition (US)
- Author: Robert Silverberg
- Cover artist: H. Lawrence Hoffman
- Language: English
- Genre: Science fiction
- Publisher: Holt, Rinehart & Winston
- Publication date: 1967
- Publication place: United States
- Media type: Print (hardcover)
- Pages: 244 pp
- Followed by: Beyond the Gate of Worlds (short stories)

The Gate of Worlds is an alternate history novel by American writer Robert Silverberg. It was first published by Holt, Rinehart & Winston in the United States in 1967. The first UK hardcover edition was published by Gollancz in 1978.

Set in an alternate timeline where the Black Death decimates much more of Europe's population, the book explores a world where the European powers are unable to recover from the pandemic, leaving them vulnerable against the rising Ottoman Empire and unable to successfully colonize the Americas, while other powers grow in size and influence in Eurasia. The novel follows young entrepreneur Dan Beauchamp and his travels to Turtle Island, leaving behind the destitute British Isles.

== Plot summary ==
In an alternate timeline, the Black Death kills three-fourths of the European population, rather than only the estimated one-third to one-half that occurred in real life, delaying progress and, ultimately, the Industrial Revolution. Most of Central Europe was conquered by the Ottoman Empire, which occupied it until the twentieth century, leaving it in no shape for colonization of much of the non-European world. Constantinople was conquered in 1420, the Ottomans moved into Vienna in 1440, and took over Paris in 1460, before invading the British Isles in 1490.

The greater virulence of the Black Death in Europe allowed non-European powers to emerge. These included the Aztecs and Incas in Middle Hesperides and Lower Hesperides, given that Europeans only "discovered" the Hesperides in 1585 through an inadvertent Portuguese expedition. In Asia, Russia, India and Japan have become the continent's dominant powers. By contrast, Turkey has undergone a period of instability that cost it control over England, from which it was expelled in the early twentieth century due to the leadership of a new royal dynasty inaugurated by "James the Valiant."

Evidently, William Shakespeare's ancestors survived the epidemic, although Shakespeare wrote his histories, tragedies, and comedies in the Turkish language, set in the Ottoman Empire milieu of England's new Muslim masters.

The narrator and protagonist is eighteen-year-old Dan Beauchamp, who travels from impoverished England in 1967 to seek his fortune in the Aztec Empire. Along his way, he is accompanied by Aztec sorcerer Quequex.

== Sequel ==
In 1991, Silverberg edited a thematic sequel to The Gate of Worlds, entitled Beyond the Gate of Worlds, consisting of three short stories that are set in the same fictional universe, and further explore its non-western multipolar world and its international relationships. Silverberg himself contributed the lead tale, "Lion Time in Timbuctoo," while John Brunner and Chelsea Quinn Yarbro also contributed stories.

== Similar works ==
Thematically, and given that it also occurs in a divergent timeline that originated in the context of a more virulent fourteenth century Black Death than our own, the 2002 novel by Kim Stanley Robinson The Years of Rice and Salt uses a similar literary device to consider the impact on global history of a less dominant Europe. However, in Robinson's analogous post-pandemic timeline, Europe never recovered from its decimation at the time of the epidemic, and India's Mughal Empire retains its ascendancy, as do the empires of China, Persia, the Ottomans, North America's Haudenosaunee confederacy, the Aztec and Inca empires and other nations of the book's multipolar world.

Much like Silverberg's alternate history, Muslim civilization declines during the alternate 19th to 20th centuries, leading to the triumphs of China and India during a decades-long 20th-century global war. Unlike Silverberg's world however, there is comparable technological progress to our own timeline, due to the prolonged multipolar global war. By its early 21st century, Robinson's world has aircraft, information technology, and potential access to nuclear weapons.

L. Neil Smith also imagined in The Crystal Empire a world where a Europe that lost most of its population to the plague is unable to resist Muslim colonization in the centuries after. In Smith's imagining, the Mongol Empire also falls victim, allowing the Mughal Empire to rise faster and farther in its place. The novel is set primarily in North America, where a descendant of European refugees who fled the plague crosses the continent to find the title civilization, established by Chinese refugees on the West Coast.

Still another novel using a similar theme is Harry Turtledove's In High Places. In that timeline, the impact of the Black Death is somewhere in between those envisioned by Silverberg and Robinson. In this depiction, Christian Europe is weakened by the plague, enabling the Muslims to conquer Spain, Italy and South France - but they are then blocked by the resistance of the remaining Christian powers, emboldened by a militant new form of Christianity centering on Henri, "The Second Son of God". Like in Silverberg's book, England in this timeline is a backwater which never amounted to much, and there was no tide of European overseas expansion and colonization. However, by the Twentieth Century, both Christians and Muslims have reached America, and are busy colonizing it, in conflict both with its natives and with each other.
