= The Years of Rice and Salt =

Novel by Kim Stanley Robinson

- Cover of UK hardcover edition
- Author: Kim Stanley Robinson
- Language: English
- Genre: Alternate history
- Publisher: Bantam Books (US); HarperCollins (UK)
- Publication date: March 2002
- Publication place: United States
- Media type: Print (hardback & paperback)
- Pages: 660
- Awards: Locus Award for Best Science Fiction Novel (2003)
- ISBN: 0-553-10920-0
- OCLC: 47894803
- Dewey Decimal: 813/.54 21
- LC Class: PS3568.O2893 Y43 2002

The Years of Rice and Salt is an alternate history novel by American science fiction author Kim Stanley Robinson, published in 2002. The novel explores how world history might have been different if the Black Death plague had killed 99 percent of Europe's population, instead of a third as it did in reality. Divided into ten parts, the story spans centuries, from the army of the Muslim conqueror Timur to the 21st century, with Europe repopulated by Muslim pioneers, the indigenous peoples of the Americas forming a league to resist Chinese and Muslim invaders, and a 67-year-long world war being fought primarily between Muslim states and the Chinese and their allies. While the ten parts take place in different times and places, they are connected by a group of characters that are reincarnated into each time but are identified to the reader by the first letter of their name being consistent in each life.

The novel explores themes of history, religion, and social movements. The historical narrative is guided more by social history than political or military history. Critics found the book to be rich in detail, plausible, and thoughtful. The Years of Rice and Salt won the Locus Award for Best Science Fiction Novel in 2003. In the same year it was nominated for the Arthur C. Clarke Award, a Hugo Award, and a British Science Fiction Award.

== Background ==
At the time of publication in 2002, science fiction author Kim Stanley Robinson was 49 years old and living in Davis, California. He had conceived of the premise for The Years of Rice and Salt in the 1970s while thinking about what alternate history scenario would result in "the biggest change that would still work in terms of comparison to our history". He subsequently developed an interest in China and in Buddhism, which he would study for this project.

Robinson's only other alternate history story prior to this project was the short story "The Lucky Strike" (1984), (Note: "The Lucky Strike" was first published in Universe #14 (ISBN 0-385-19134-0) and was nominated for a Hugo and a Nebula Award) where the Enola Gay crashes in a training exercise and the secondary crew must complete the Hiroshima bombing.

Robinson also wrote an essay titled "A Sensitive Dependence on Initial Conditions" (1991), (Note: "A Sensitive Dependence on Initial Conditions" was first published in Author's Choice #20 (OCLC 23764754)) comparing different theories of history and laws of science, such as the covering law model, to explain how alternate histories can be arrived at, using "The Lucky Strike" as an example. (Note: Both "The Lucky Strike" and "A Sensitive Dependence on Initial Conditions" were published together in the 2009 booklet The Lucky Strike by PM Press (ISBN 9781604860856) as part of their Outspoken Authors series.)

He explored the idea of non-Western influences creating a new culture while working on his Mars trilogy, which involved a heavy Muslim influence in a Martian colony. The Mars trilogy gave Robinson a reputation for quality of writing and a richness of detail comparable to James Michener, as well as winning him a Nebula Award for Red Mars (1993) and two Hugo and Locus Awards for Green Mars (1994) and Blue Mars (1996). Robinson followed the Mars trilogy with the novel Antarctica (1997), which won an Alex Award, and two short story collections, The Martians (1999) and Vinland the Dream (2001), before publishing The Years of Rice and Salt.

== Plot ==
The story is divided into ten parts.

=== Book One: Awake to Emptiness ===
Bold and Psin, scouts in Timur's army, discover a Magyar city where all the inhabitants have died from a plague. Timur turns his army around and orders the scouting party executed to avoid the plague, but Bold escapes and wanders through the dead lands of Eastern Europe, encountering only one lone native. Upon reaching the sea he is captured by Turkish Muslim slave traders and sold to Zheng He's Chinese treasure fleet. Bold befriends a young African slave, named Kyu, whom he cares for after the Chinese castrate him.

In China, they are kept as kitchen slaves until Kyu burns the restaurant and convinces Bold to escape with him. The pair make their way north to Beijing where they find work at the palace of Zhu Gaozhi, heir to the Yongle Emperor. The vengeful Kyu, hating the Chinese for what they have done to him, incites violence between the eunuchs and the Confucian administrative officials. After his scheming is discovered, Kyu is assassinated.

Kyu and Bold reunite in the bardo, where Bold explains to Kyu the concepts of cyclical reincarnation alongside one's jati. He explains that their jati also includes Psin, the restaurant owners Shen and I-li, and an unknown number of others, and that their group has been especially close since an avalanche in Tibet killed them all at once in a previous cycle. Kyu resolves to do better in his next life.

=== Book Two: The Haj in the Heart ===
In Mughal India, two Hindu girls named Kokila and Bihari grow up together studying traditional medicine. Kokila is married to the son of an unpopular village headman. Her husband's brother gets Bihari pregnant, and Kokila is too late to save her from dying in a miscarriage. In revenge, Kokila uses her knowledge of herbs to fatally poison her brother-in-law and father. She is executed for her crime.

Kokila reincarnates as a tiger named Kya, who saves Bistami, a Sufi mystic of Persian origin, from an attack by Hindus. After seeing Bistami beaten by his older brother, Kya kills the brother, and is trapped and killed by the villagers in retaliation.

Bistami goes on to become a judge for the Mughal Emperor Akbar, but later falls into his disfavour and is exiled to Mecca. Bistami spends a year in Mecca before learning that he is being blamed for Akbar forsaking Islam, and departs again, traveling to the Maghreb and Iberia (Al-Andalus). Accompanied by Ibn Ezra, a follower of the historian Ibn Khaldun, Bistami joins a caravan led by Sultan Mawji and his wife Katima, who seek to found a new city on the other side of the Pyrenees.

The caravan members found a city called Baraka on the abandoned former site of Bayonne, France, and create a model society based on Katima's feminist interpretation of the Quran. After Mawji dies, Katima rules the community on her own. Believing this to be heresy, the Caliph of Al-Andalus sends an army against Baraka. Bistami, Katima, Ibn Ezra, and their remaining followers flee again, this time founding the city of Nsara (near Nantes, France).

=== Book Three: Ocean Continents ===
The Wanli Emperor orders a fleet under Admiral Kheim to invade Nippon (Japan). When the wind fails to arrive, the huge fleet is swept out to sea by the Kuroshio Current and set adrift on the unexplored Pacific Ocean. Deciding that their only hope of returning home is to ride the North Pacific Gyre, the fleet navigates all the way to the New World.

The sailors land on the West coast of North America and make contact with the peaceful Miwok people. Kheim befriends a girl named Butterfly and begins teaching her to speak Chinese. Once Kheim discovers they have infected the indigenous people with disease, he orders his crew to leave at once, but a sailor named Peng jumps ship to remain with his Miwok lover. Butterfly comes aboard the fleet, intending to voyage with Kheim back to China.

Continuing south, Kheim's fleet encounters the Inca Empire. They are taken prisoner, and both Kheim and Butterfly are set to be ritually sacrificed; Kheim escapes by awing the natives with his flintlock pistol. On the return trip to China, Butterfly is fatally injured during a storm and soon dies. Kheim tells the Emperor that the Inca are militarily weak and rich in gold. In the bardo, a grieving and enraged Kheim attacks the goddess Kali with his sword, but is unable to wound her.

=== Book Four: The Alchemist ===
Khalid, an alchemist from Samarkand during the Bukhara Khanate, attempts to fool the Khan into believing that he has discovered the Philosopher's stone. The Khan's aide discovers the fraud and Khalid's hand is severed as punishment. Khalid becomes disenchanted with alchemy and decides to destroy all his books. His friend Iwang, a Tibetan Buddhist mathematician, and son-in-law Bahram, a Sufi blacksmith, instead convince Khalid to test the claims in the books through practical experiments, particularly those of Aristotle.

Khalid and Iwang devote themselves to demonstrations that use the scientific method to greatly progress knowledge of physics, chemistry, mathematics, biology, and weaponry. Their discoveries inspire Samarkand's other madrasa scholars to conduct scientific investigations of their own. However, the Khan still sees Khalid as a con artist, and demands that he prove his worth by inventing new weapons to fight the rising Chinese threat to the East. The Chinese attack never comes; in the end, everyone at Khalid's lab is killed by an outbreak of plague, implied to have resulted from the Khan's refusal to listen to Khalid and Iwang's suggestions to improve the city's sanitation.

=== Book Five: Warp and Weft ===
The Iroquois people, referred to throughout by their own name of Hodenosaunee (People of the Longhouse) hold a ceremony to raise a foreigner named Fromwest to the rank of Chief. After distinguishing himself in a game of lacrosse, Fromwest tells the story of how he came to the northeast of the continent he calls Yingzhou. Formerly a samurai named Busho, he fled to the New World after the Chinese conquered Japan. He was eventually captured by a war party of Sioux and rescued by warriors from the Seneca people.

In an ecstatic vision, Fromwest appears to remember his past lives. He realizes that Peng (from "Ocean Continents") made his way to the Hodenosaunee and taught them about variolation, blunting the impact of smallpox epidemics on their civilization. Fromwest reveals that he has come to organize the Hodenosaunee into a larger defensive alliance capable of resisting Chinese and Muslim colonizers, and offers to teach them how to mass-produce their own firearms.

After their next deaths, the jati members apply scientific reasoning to the bardo, and manage to resist drinking the tonic of forgetting before being reincarnated.

=== Book Six: Widow Kang ===
During the reign of the Qianlong Emperor, Chinese widow Kang Tongbi takes in a Buddhist monk and his son whom she finds scavenging. The monk, Bao Ssu, is wrongly implicated in a series of queue cuttings and dies in prison. Later, Kang meets a Hui Muslim scholar named Ibrahim ibn Hasam, and they perform a ritual that allows them to remember their past lives.

Kang and Ibrahim marry and move to Lanzhou in western China, where they work to try to reconcile Islamic and Confucian beliefs. Kang anthologizes proto-feminist poetry and becomes a well-known writer. The Jahriyya Islamic movement gains adherents in the west but faces intolerance from the Qing administration, leading to a revolt that the Qing crush with massive force. Lanzhou is swamped by a dramatic flood; Bao Ssu's son rescues a pregnant Kang from the rising waters. In a work based on Kang's ideas, Ibrahim publishes his thoughts on the Four Great Inequalities: warriors and priests over farmers, men over women, men over children, and certain races over other races.

=== Book Seven: The Age of Great Progress ===
In the equivalent of the Christian 19th century, the Indian state of Travancore has overthrown the Mughals and the Safavids and developed steam engines, ironclad warships, and military balloons. Using these new weapons, they sail to Kostantiniyye and easily topple the Ottoman Empire. A Muslim Armenian doctor named Ismail ibn Mani al-Dir, who had served the Ottoman Sultan, is captured and sent to Travancore, where he happily joins the hospital of Travancore and works in anatomy and physiology. Ismail eventually meets their ruler, the Kerala of Travancore, who aims to drive out the Muslim invaders and unify India—and eventually the whole world—into a democratic confederation.

Later, during the Xianfeng Emperor's reign, the Japanese enclave known as Gold Mountain (in the real-world San Francisco Bay Area) has been subjugated by Chinese colonists. A Japanese slave named Kiyoaki is swept out to sea by the Great Flood of 1862. Along with a pregnant Chinese refugee, Peng-ti, Kiyoaki manages to flee to the great coastal city of Fangzhang. There, Kiyoaki joins a Japanese freedom movement supported by Travancore, with Ismail acting as a liaison.

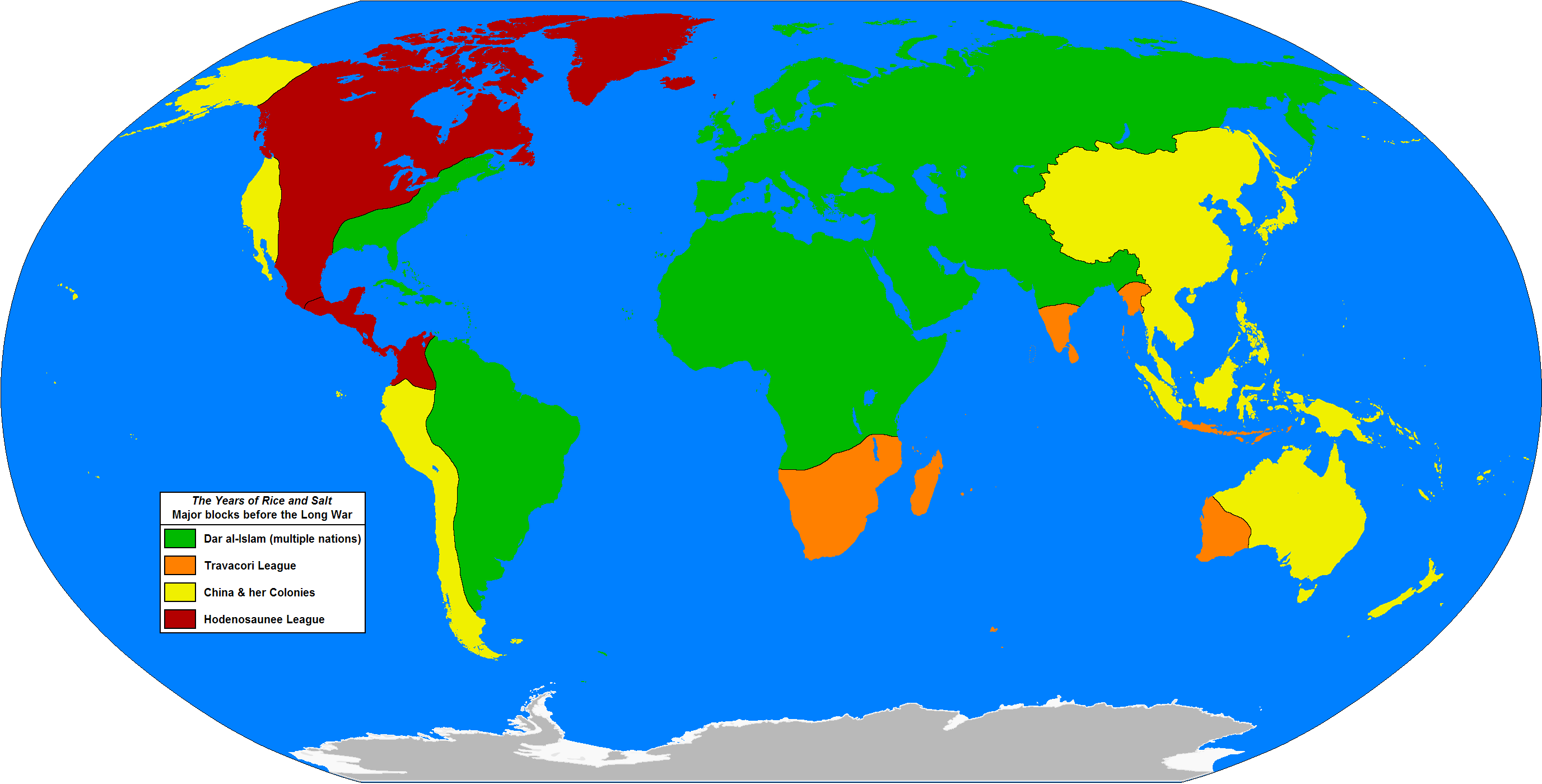
Map of the world of The Years of Rice and Salt in the year 1333 AH (1915 AD), showing the four major blocs and alliances on the eve of the "Long War". Dar al-Islam (multiple nations in alliance during the war) Travancori League China & her Colonies Hodenosaunee League

=== Book Eight: War of the Asuras ===
Book Eight is set in the 20th century, during the "Long War". The world has become divided into four great alliances: the Chinese Empire and its colonies, the fractured Muslim world (Dar al-Islam), and the democratic Indian and Hodenosaunee Leagues. At the outbreak of war, the Muslim states put aside their differences to fight the larger threat of China. The Indian and Hodenosaunee Leagues stay neutral at first, but eventually ally with China, seeing the Muslims as their greater enemy. The war drags on for decades and causes major changes in human society, including rapid industrialisation, mass conscription, and mass casualties. New devastating weapons and methods are employed, including trench warfare, chemical warfare, and air strikes.

Chinese officers Kuo, Bai, and Iwa fight in the trenches of the Gansu Corridor, where the ground has been blasted down to bedrock by sixty years of bombardments. Kuo is killed when a shell penetrates their bunker. Bai and Iwa are ordered to move with their company south through Tibet to support their Indian allies. At a pass in the Himalayas, they witness Muslim artillery destroying the top of Mount Everest so that the tallest mountain in the world will be in Muslim lands. Bai is plagued by visions of his dead friend Kuo, who tells him that he is already dead, killed by the same shell that killed Kuo.

After extreme difficulties, Bai and Iwa's forces manage to breach the Muslim defences at the pass. The Chinese army pours through to join forces with the Indians, turning the course of the war in their favor. The Chinese and Indian Buddhists unite to share a ritual beside the destroyed Bodhi Tree.

=== Book Nine: Nsara ===
In the aftermath of the Long War, a young Muslim woman named Budur and her aunt Idelba escape Budur's restrictive traditional family in the Alps and move to the more liberal and cosmopolitan city of Nsara. They stay at a zawiyya, a refuge for women, where Idelba restarts her work in physics and Budur enrolls in university to study history. She grows close to Kirana, a feminist history lecturer who questions everything about Muslim society and argues for emancipation and liberation. The two have a brief affair.

The world of The Years of Rice and Salt in 1423 AH (2002 AD), after the "Long War".: I. Yingzhou II. Inka III. Firanja IV. Maghrib V. Sahel VI. Zanj / VII. Ingoli VIII. Botswana IX. Skandistan X. Iran XI. Arabia XII. Greater Japan / XIII. China XIV. Indian League XV. Burmese League XVI. Mindanao XVII. Aozhou XVIII. Maori

Life in Nsara becomes increasingly difficult as the Islamic world faces the effects of losing the Long War, including hyperinflation, food shortages, and strikes. Many governments in Dar al-Islam are overthrown by coups. When the military attempts to overthrow the legitimate government of Nsara, Budur and Kirana incite mass protests. Eventually, the Hodenosaunee League send a fleet from their naval base at Orkney to back the protestors in Nsara, forcing the military to surrender.

Meanwhile, Idelba's work in atomic physics lead her to the disturbing discovery that it is possible to build a devastating weapon from nuclear chain reactions. The government learns of her work and raids the zawiyya, but Budur manages to hide Idelba's papers. Idelba dies of radiation poisoning and leaves all her research to Budur, who has begun using the principles of radiation to develop Radiocarbon dating.

Budur's work in archaeology gets her invited to an international conference of scientists in Isfahan, Iran. There, she convenes a group of scientists from all the major world powers, all of whom agree to convince their various governments that nuclear weapons are too impractical to manufacture. The group initiates an international scientific movement to break down barriers between cultures. In the halls of the conference, Budur is overcome by an exhibit about a Tibetan village preserved by an avalanche, but cannot explain why.

=== Book Ten: The First Years ===
Bao Xinhua is a revolutionary in China, who works under the leadership of his friend Kung Jianguo. Bao and Kung successfully overthrow the oppressive Chinese government, but Kung is assassinated on the cusp of their victory. Disillusioned, Bao leaves China and serves as a diplomat all over the world, eventually marrying and settling down to raise two children in Fangzhang (San Francisco).

After his wife dies, Bao accepts a diplomatic post in Myanmar, where he reunites with a comrade from his revolutionary years named Isao Zhu. Zhu poses many macrohistorical questions, attempting to arrive at a unified theory of history; in a moment of Metafiction, Zhu and Bao contemplate using the bardo as a narrative device to illustrate the gradual improvement of human society. Bao later returns to Fangzhang to teach history in a village implied to be located near real-life Davis, California. At the end of the novel, he meets a new student named Kali, implied to be Kung reborn.

== Style, themes and genre ==
The novel is divided into ten chapters that each act as a short story, linked by the use of a group of people who appear in each story. After spending time in bardo, the group (or jāti) are reincarnated into different times and places. While characters in each story are unique, they share some characteristics with their previous incarnations and are linked, for convenience, by the first letter of their name. The characters whose names begin with the letter K are "combative, imprudent and prone to getting himself (or herself) killed" and "striking blows against injustice that typically lead to more suffering". The B characters are "more comfortable in the world, meliorist and optimistic" and "survivors, nurturing friends and family through bad times and patiently waiting for something better". The I characters are "the ones who care, who follow the other two, and may be necessary if their works are to flourish, but who tend to the domestic and always find the world worth loving." The style of writing also changes every chapter to reflect the style of writing associated with the culture being depicted. For example, the first chapter is written similarly to Monkey's Journey to the West and a later chapter incorporates postmodernism. Also, later chapters take on metafictional elements, with characters discussing the nature of history, whether it is cyclical or linear, whether they believe in reincarnation, and feelings that some people are intrinsically linked.

Robinson incorporated utopian themes in his previous works but reviewers were divided on whether The Years of Rice and Salt qualified as a utopian story. Those that did call the world described in the story as utopian cited the story's illustration of progress. However, those that wrote The Years of Rice and Salt was not a utopian story say that the world history presented is not necessarily better or worse than the real history, just different. Robinson calls himself a "utopian novelist" in that he claims "all science fiction has a utopian element, in that it tends to say that what we do now matters and will have consequences". Several other themes were identified by reviewers. Robinson had previously used the theme of memory (or identity) and incorporates it into this story with characters who are reincarnated versions of previous characters and who only recognize each other while in the bardo, but sometimes feel a connection between themselves while on earth. The reviewer in The Globe and Mail identified feminism and "struggles over the nature of Islam" as recurring themes.

=== Alternate history ===
...the complaints about alternative histories being "too much like" our history are always balanced, sometimes in the same commentator, by complaints that it is "too different to be possible," and I have concluded that really one can't win: alternatives to our world history are in some deep sense unthinkable. The alternative history then becomes an exercise in pushing at that limit and always asking "why" to one's responses concerning "plausibility" or the like.

— Kim Stanley Robinson

The Years of Rice and Salt belongs to the alternate history subgenre of speculative fiction. The novel starts at the point of divergence with Timur turning his army away from Europe where the Black Death killed 99 percent of Europe's population, instead of a third. Robinson explores world history from that point in AD 1405 (807 AH) to about AD 2045 (1467 AH).

Robinson's take on alternate history is that because it "is set in the same lawful universe as ours, its science must be the same [and] because its people have the same basic human needs, their societies resemble ours." Therefore, despite the difference in who specifically is there, "the great majority of humanity [is] doing their work, and that work would tend to forge along at a certain pace as people tried to solve the problems of making themselves more comfortable in this world."

While most alternate histories use the Great Man theory of history, focusing on leaders, wars, and big events, Robinson writes more about social history, similar to the Annales School of historical theory and Marxist historiography, focusing on the lives of ordinary people living in their time and place. This is reflected in the title of the novel, The Years of Rice and Salt, which refers to the everyday chores of raising a family, often performed by women, despite the politics and wars of men.

Reviewers noted this allows for the "history [to be] experienced by readers on a human scale" and "an implicit but thorough rebuke to the kind of war-gaming determinism that most alternate histories embody." The novel has characters that explore subjects like philosophy, theology, history, and scientific theory.

== Publication and reception ==
Robinson takes advantage of the romance inherent in the idea of reincarnation; it's a lovely, seductive concept, and it adds much mystical texture to the narrative. But that does not mean the author is any less tough-minded here than in his other books. Indeed, The Years of Salt and Rice, for all of its fantastic elements, is essentially a character-driven — which is to say, literary — series of novelettes.

— Chauncy Mabe, Books Editor, South Florida Sun-Sentinel

Released in March 2002, the book was published in North America by Bantam Books and in the United Kingdom by HarperCollins. The paperback was released in 2003 along with a Spanish translation. In the subsequent years, other translated versions were published, in French, Polish, Chinese, and Hungarian.

The novel was well received by critics who variously called it "thoughtful", "realistic", and "rich". In Publishers Weekly, the reviewers called it a "highly realistic and credible alternate history", and in the School Library Journal, Christine Menefee called it "an addictive, surprising, and suspenseful novel". The Library Journal "highly recommended" it, saying that its "superb storytelling and imaginative historic speculation make [it] a priority choice for all SF and general fiction collections". The critic at Kirkus Reviews found it "overlong, but blessed with moments of wry and gentle beauty". Likewise, Roz Kaveney stated that "if there is a weakness in Robinson's work, it is perhaps this; his characters are so intelligent that they never shut up". For The Globe and Mail, Sol Chrom lauded the epic scope, calling it a "magnificent achievement", and for The Belfast News Letter, the reviewer called the novel "extraordinary, ambitious, poetic and powerful". Science fiction critic Paul Kincaid concluded that it is "a huge, complex and highly enjoyable book".

=== Awards ===
It won the 2003 Locus Award for Best Science Fiction Novel and was nominated for the Hugo Award, the Arthur C. Clarke Award, and the British Science Fiction Award.

== See also ==
Other alternate-history novels where the Black Death was much deadlier in Europe, which was subsequently colonized in whole or part by Muslims:

- The Gate of Worlds, by Robert Silverberg, published in 1966
- The Crystal Empire, by L. Neil Smith, published in 1986
- In High Places, by Harry Turtledove, published in 2005
- Lion's Blood, by Steven Barnes, published in 2003
