= Departures (short story collection) =

1993 collection of short stories by Harry Turtledove

- Cover of the first edition
- Author: Harry Turtledove
- Cover artist: Barclay Shaw
- Language: English
- Genre: Science fiction short stories
- Publisher: Del Rey Books
- Publication date: June 1993
- Publication place: United States
- Media type: Print (paperback)
- Pages: 342 pp
- ISBN: 0-345-38011-8
- LC Class: MLC R CP00507

Departures is a collection of alternate history stories by Harry Turtledove, first published in paperback by Del Rey Books in June 1993 and reprinted in October 1998; an ebook edition followed from the same publisher in May 2011. The first British edition was published in ebook form by Gateway/Orion in July 2013.

The book contains twenty short short stories and novelettes by the author, some originally published under his early pseudonym Eric G. Iverson, together with an introductory author's note. The first edition also includes a short piece about the author and an excerpt from his then-recent novel The Guns of the South.

"In the Presence of Mine Enemies" was later expanded into a full-length novel in 2003.

== Short stories ==
- "Author's Note"
- "Counting Potsherds"
- "Death in Vesunna" (with Elaine O'Byrne)
- "Departures" (prequel to Agent of Byzantium)
- "Islands in the Sea"
- "Not All Wolves"
- "Clash of Arms"
- "Pillar of Cloud, Pillar of Fire" (part of Agent of Byzantium series)
- "Report of the Special Committee on the Quality of Life"
- "Batboy"
- "The Last Reunion"
- "Designated Hitter"
- "Gladly Wolde He Lerne"
- "The Barbecue, the Movie, and Other Unfortunately Not So Relevant Material"
- "In the Presence of Mine Enemies"
- "The R Strain"
- "Lure"
- "Secret Names"
- "Les Mortes D'Arthur"
- "Last Favour"
- "Nasty, Brutish, and..."

== Recognition ==
The collection placed thirteenth in the 1994 Locus Poll Award for Best Collection.
