= Curious Notions =

2004 novel by Harry Turtledove

- First edition
- Author: Harry Turtledove
- Cover artist: Kazuhiko Sano
- Language: English
- Series: Crosstime Traffic
- Genre: Alternate history
- Publisher: Tor Books
- Publication date: October 7, 2004
- Publication place: United States
- Media type: Print (Hardback & Paperback)
- Pages: 272
- ISBN: 0-7653-0694-8
- OCLC: 54974366
- Dewey Decimal: 813/.54 22
- LC Class: PS3570.U76 C87 2004
- Preceded by: Gunpowder Empire
- Followed by: In High Places

Curious Notions is an alternate history novel by Harry Turtledove. It is a part of the Crosstime Traffic series. In Curious Notions, the Central Powers won World War I prior to the United States entering the war. Subsequently, the German Empire invaded and conquered the United States in the 1950s. The story is set 150 years later, in German-occupied San Francisco. The main plot deals with time travelers from our universe establishing an electronics shop in San Francisco, coming under the suspicion of both the German authorities and the Tongs while preventing the Germans from duplicating the time travel technology.

== Backstory leading up to the plot ==
The Central Powers win by managing to knock out France and the British Expeditionary Force in the west towards the beginning of the war. Then they defeat Russia before the United States can intervene. A few years later, the German Empire intervenes in the Russian Revolution and defeats the Bolsheviks, but the Russian Empire is mostly divided and therefore no longer a great power. Britain and France tried to stop Germany's power again in the late 1930s, but since the United States does not intervene, they lose and Germany gains control over Europe and its sphere of influence. Germany is also able to restore the monarchies of Brazil, China and Portugal.

Since Germany never persecuted the Jewish people of their country, they discovered the atomic bomb and gain further dominance. The United States was largely ignorant of the power of these bombs and as a result lost World War III when it broke out in 1956. It resulted in the nuclear destruction of most major cities in the United States. San Francisco, the setting, is intact because the United States was able to shoot some of the German bombers down before they could reach the city.

A side effect of the US being dominated by Germany is soccer becoming the most popular spectator sport in the American society, largely displacing baseball.

== Literary significance and reception ==
Roland J. Green reviewing for Booklist said that a "well-constructed world, superior characterization, and some serious analysis of the ethics of cross-time travel all make the yarn a winner."

== See also ==
- Uncle Alf, a short story that was also written by Turtledove with a similar point of divergence.
