= Gunpowder Empire =

2003 novel by Harry Turtledove

- First edition
- Author: Harry Turtledove
- Cover artist: Kazuhiko Sano
- Language: English
- Series: Crosstime Traffic
- Genre: Alternate history
- Publisher: Tor Books
- Publication date: December 5, 2003
- Publication place: United States
- Media type: Print (Hardback & Paperback)
- Pages: 288
- ISBN: 0-7653-0693-X
- OCLC: 52459857
- Dewey Decimal: 813/.54 21
- LC Class: PS3570.U76 G85 2003
- Followed by: Curious Notions

Gunpowder Empire is a 2003 alternate history novel by Harry Turtledove. It is the first part of the Crosstime Traffic series.

== Plot ==
In the novel, Jeremy and Amanda Solter are two teenagers living in the late 21st century. Their parents work for Crosstime Traffic, a trading company using time travel to go back and forth from parallel versions of Earth to trade for resources to help sustain their version of Earth. One summer, the children work with their parents, going to Polisso – in our timeline a village in Romania with the ancient Porolissum ruins nearby, in the alternate timeline a major city of a Roman Empire that never collapsed.

In the intervening centuries, the Romans advanced to the extent of inventing gunpowder – hence the title of the book – putting their armies on about 17th-century level. By 2100, they had not, however, gone through an Industrial Revolution and many of their social institutions, in particular slavery, remain much as they were in earlier Roman times. North of the Roman Empire, a rival Lietuvan Empire has grown up similar to a still surviving Polish–Lithuanian Commonwealth, with occasional wars breaking out between the two. It is said that most of these wars would end in an exchange of border provinces. Romans consider the Lietuvans "barbarians", though in fact the two have much the same level of technology and culture.

An important aspect of the book is that Christianity never became the Roman Empire's dominant religion, but remained one of the Empire's many religions. Persecution of Christians ceased due to a pragmatic compromise whereby Christians are obliged to burn incense "for the Emperor's health" but are not required to worship "pagan" gods. Christians are subdivided between "Imperial Christians" - mainly the richer ones - who perform this ceremony in order to advance their business interests, and more principled Christians who refuse to perform it and accept the resulting social disabilities. The rival Lietuvan Empire, dedicated to the worship of Perkunas, is actively intolerant and Christians who attempt missionary activity there face martyrdom.

When the youngsters' mother becomes sick, their father takes her back to their home time for treatment, expecting to come back in a few days – but the cross-time travel equipment suffers a break in link, stranding Jeremy and Amanda in Polisso just as the Lietuvan Army crosses the border, placing Polisso under siege. At the same time, the Roman authorities begin to grow suspicious of their trade mission and the origin of such items as watches and Swiss army knives which they offer for sale and which no artisan in the Empire can match.

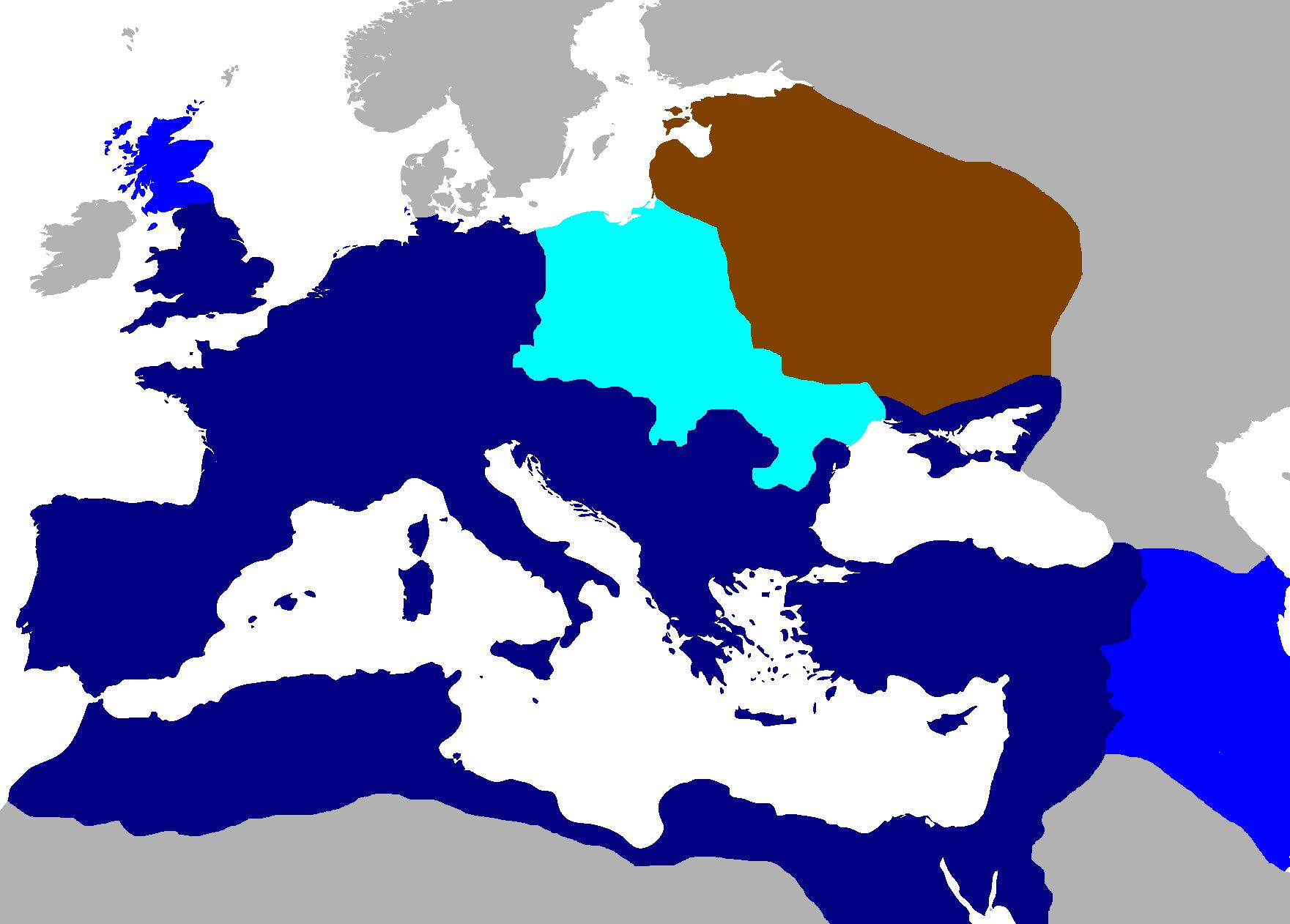
Map of Europe in 2100 CE in the book. Dark blue areas are areas under Roman control; blue areas are areas speculated to be under Roman control, but are not mentioned; brown areas are the Lietuvans; whereas light blue areas are contested areas between the Romans and Lietuvans

== Reception ==
Roland J. Green, reviewing for Booklist, said, "Seemingly a series opener intended to introduce the concept of parallel worlds and Turtledove's take on it, the book succeeds as an homage to parallelworlds pioneer Piper and a well-told, engaging tale." Peter Cannon, reviewing for Publishers Weekly, said, "Turtledove presents his teenaged heroes with a series of moral choices and dilemmas that will particularly resonate with younger fans. This is a rousing story that reminds us that "adventure" really is someone else in deep trouble a long way off." Don D'Ammassa, in his review for the Journal Chronicle, praised the novel, saying, "I really enjoyed this one, which had lively characters and events, and whose setting seemed much more interesting and better realized than that in the author's other recent novels."

The novel's name is derived from the concept of Gunpowder empires, referring to historical Muslim empires which remained stable over centuries due to their possession of gunpowder and artillery; in the novel, the surviving Roman Empire develops along similar lines.

== See also ==
- Agent of Byzantium
- Germanicus trilogy
- Lest Darkness Fall
- Roma Eterna
- Romanitas
- Warlords of Utopia
- Bread and Circuses (Star Trek: The Original Series)
- Gunpowder empires (actual historical empires)
