= Agent of Byzantium =

Collection of short stories by Harry Turtledove

- First edition cover
- Author: Harry Turtledove
- Cover artist: J. K. Potter
- Language: English
- Genre: Alternate history, spy fiction
- Publisher: Congdon & Weed
- Publication date: 1987
- Publication place: United States
- Media type: Print (Hardback and paperback)
- Pages: x + 244
- ISBN: 0-86553-183-8

Agent of Byzantium is a 1987 collection of short stories by Harry Turtledove, centered on the exploits of Basil Argyros, a Byzantine secret agent. The stories are set in an alternate 14th century, where Islam never existed and the great ancient empires of Byzantium (the Eastern Roman Empire) and Sassanid Persia survive.

== Setting ==
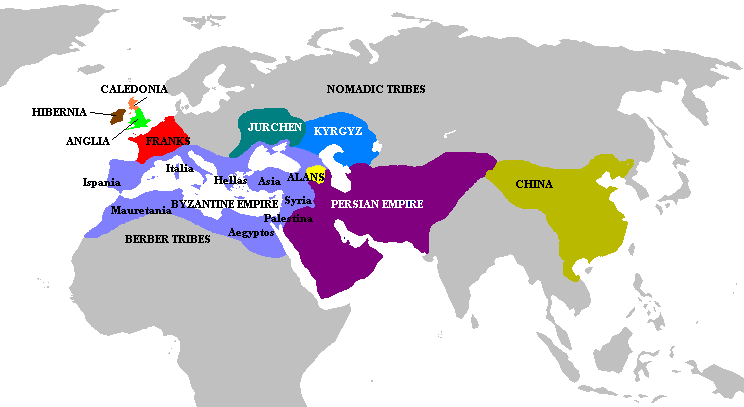
The world of the Agent of Byzantium series.

In this universe, the point of divergence occurs when the Prophet Muhammad (Mouamet), instead of developing Islam, converted to Christianity and became a celebrated prelate and saint. Without the Muslim conquests, the Eastern Roman Empire remained the pre-eminent power in the Mediterranean world. The Emperor Constans II subdued the Lombards in Italy, and the Iberian Peninsula (Ispania) and the southern coast of Gaul were also recovered. Most of Gaul, Britain and Germania are in "barbarian" hands, and have broken away from Byzantine orthodoxy, following the doctrine of filioque and a separate line of Popes. In the East, the Byzantines are still—as it was in our history up to the advent of Islam—involved in a never-ending cold war (occasionally flaring up into actual fighting) with its arch-enemy, the Sassanid Empire, represented in the series by the female spy Mirrane.

Argyros works as an army scout, and later as a magistrianos for the Master of Offices, under the (fictional) Emperor Nikephoros III, and as such is sent across the Empire to solve problems—sometimes as a spy, sometimes as a negotiator, and sometimes as a soldier. The cover of the 1994 re-issue compares Argyros to James Bond and Dominic Flandry.

The Jurchens - who in actual history played an important role in Chinese history and never showed an inclination to migrate westwards - did in this changed timeline move across Siberia, reach the borders of the Byzantine Empire and there pose a serious threat. Turtledove does not explain how Muhammad becoming Christian had this eventual drastic effect on the behavior of the Jurchens in the Far East.

== Stories and publication history ==
Stories in the Agent of Byzantium universe (in order written) are:

- "Unholy Trinity", first published in the July 1985 issue of Amazing Science Fiction Stories. It takes place on Etos Kosmou 6824 (AD 1315/16) in the Abbey of Saint Gall
- "Archetypes", first published in the November 1985 issue of Amazing Science Fiction Stories. It takes place on Etos Kosmou 6825 (AD 1316/17) in the frontier city of Dara
- "The Eyes of Argos", first published in the January 1986 issue of Amazing Science Fiction Stories. It takes place on Etos Kosmou 6814 (AD 1305/6), dealing with an invasion by nomadic Jurchens across the Danube frontier
- "Strange Eruptions", first published in the August 1986 issue of Isaac Asimov's Science Fiction Magazine. It takes place on Etos Kosmou 6816 (AD 1307/8), and is set during an epidemic in Constantinople
- "Superwine", first published in the March1987 issue of Isaac Asimov's Science Fiction Magazine. It takes place on Etos Kosmou 6829 (AD 1320/21), and takes place in Alania
- "Images", first published in the April 1987 issue of Isaac Asimov's Science Fiction Magazine. It takes place on Etos Kosmou 6826 (AD 1317/18) and is set in Constantinople during an ecumenical council dealing with the question of iconoclasm
- "Pillar of Cloud, Pillar of Fire", first published in the December 1989 issue of Isaac Asimov's Science Fiction Magazine. It takes place on Etos Kosmou 6818 (AD 1309/10), and takes place in Alexandria
- "Departures", first published in the January 1989 issue of Isaac Asimov's Science Fiction Magazine. It is the only story that does not feature Argyros, and instead focuses on the future St. Mouamet (formerly Muhammad) during his time in a monastery in Syria.

The first six stories comprise the first edition of Agent of Byzantium, published in 1987 by Congdon & Weed. "Pillar of Cloud, Pillar of Fire" and "Departures" were first published in the Departures collection in 1993. "Pillar of Cloud, Pillar of Fire" was included in the second edition of Agent of Byzantium, published in 1994 by Baen Books. "The Eyes of Argos" was also published in the There Will Be War IV: Guns of Darkness collection in 1987.

== Reception ==
Orson Scott Card praised Turtledove as "a very talented science fiction writer, with a gift for finding a way to present a fascinating idea through strong, believable characters."

== Differences ==
Turtledove, who has a PhD in Byzantine history, created a setting for the series in which the world of Late Antiquity is projected seven centuries into the future. In each story, several familiar inventions and social institutions crop up far ahead of schedule, and under very different circumstances than they did in our world. Among these are:

- The telescope, discovered among the shamans of the Jurchen nomads who threaten the Byzantine Empire from the north.
- Vaccination for smallpox, which is discovered during a terrible plague afflicting Constantinople itself.
- Trade unions and strikes, appearing first among the builders engaged in the dangerous rebuilding of a great lighthouse in Alexandria, Egypt (an Egyptian village, Deir el-Medina, is where the first recorded strike in history occurred in 1152 BC).
- Black powder, developed by the monks in the Abbey of St. Gall and used with great effect by the empire's Frankish enemies—until stolen by Argyros, with the help of agents from an Anglo-Saxon England which has known no Norman Conquest.
- Printing, invented by the Byzantine Empire's Persian enemies and used to foment sedition and dissension inside its borders, until this secret is also apprehended by Argyros.
- Distilling, invented by a wine-seller in Constantinople and purchased for the empire by Argyros.

== See also ==
- Germanicus trilogy
- Gunpowder Empire
- Lest Darkness Fall
- Roma Eterna
- Romanitas
- Warlords of Utopia
