= In High Places (Turtledove novel) =

2005 novel by Harry Turtledove

- First edition
- Author: Harry Turtledove
- Cover artist: Kazuhiko Sano
- Language: English
- Series: Crosstime Traffic
- Genre: Alternate history
- Publisher: Tor Books
- Publication date: December 27, 2005
- Publication place: United States
- Media type: Print (hardback and paperback)
- Pages: 272
- ISBN: 0-7653-0696-4
- OCLC: 60664336
- Dewey Decimal: 813/.54 22
- LC Class: PS3570.U76 I5 2006
- Preceded by: Curious Notions
- Followed by: The Disunited States of America

In High Places is an alternate history novel by Harry Turtledove. It is a part of the Crosstime Traffic series, and takes place in an alternate world where the Black Death was much more virulent, killing 80 percent of the European population, with the continent subsequently repopulated by Muslims.

The later part of the book takes place in another alternate world, where the Roman Empire was aborted at an early stage and where Spain is divided between Carthaginian colonies on the shores and Basque tribes in the interior.

== Plot summary ==
The book focuses on the relations between Christians and Muslims, as well as slaves and masters, in the medieval society through the eyes of Annette, an 18-year-old time traveller from the late 21st century who poses as the daughter of a Muslim merchant and who is captured and sold into slavery. It is also the first book in the series to concentrate more upon the late 21st-century origins of the Crosstime Traffic organization.

== Reception ==
Publishers Weekly in their review said "Turtledove convincingly portrays the conflict between Christians and Muslims, but takes less care in depicting male-and-female relationships. Didactic pronouncements on slavery notwithstanding, the book should satisfy its target audience of younger readers." Roland J. Green in his review for Booklist said that "although the last third is a bit jumbled, this is the best Crosstime Traffic yarn to date, featuring, besides two engaging protagonists, extensive exploration of the ethical issues of slavery."

== See also ==
- The Gate of Worlds
- The Years of Rice and Salt
