= The Gladiator (Turtledove novel) =

2007 novel by Harry Turtledove

- First edition
- Author: Harry Turtledove
- Cover artist: Scott M. Fischer
- Language: English
- Series: Crosstime Traffic
- Genre: Alternate history
- Publisher: Tor Books
- Publication date: May 2007
- Publication place: United States
- Media type: Print (Hardback and Paperback)
- ISBN: 076531486X
- OCLC: 84904009
- Dewey Decimal: 813/.54 22
- LC Class: PS3570.U76 G56 2007
- Preceded by: The Disunited States of America
- Followed by: The Valley-Westside War

The Gladiator is a novel for young adults by American writer Harry Turtledove, published in 2007. Part of the loose Crosstime Traffic family of books, it is set in a world in an alternate history in which the Soviet Union has won the Cold War. It tied with Jo Walton's Ha'penny for the 2008 Prometheus Award.

== Plot summary ==
The Gladiator follows the same concept as the other Crosstime Traffic novels. A parallel world similar in most respects to our own has discovered the technology to visit and trade with other parallels, spreading the notions of liberty and capitalism at the same time.

The plot of The Gladiator follows the same formula of the other books in the series with an imperiled company operative and local protagonists being used as guides to the parallel. In The Gladiator, it is indeed the capitalist West that has been consigned to the "dustbin of history" and the world has been remade in the image of the Soviet Union. The point of divergence from ours was in 1962. U.S. President John F. Kennedy decides to allow the Soviet missiles to remain in Cuba during the Cuban Missile Crisis and the complete withdrawal from the Vietnam War in 1968. Thus, communism spreads throughout Latin America and Southeast Asia giving the Soviet Union an upper hand in economic and military strength over the United States. Due to the embargo of the many countries that were integrated into the Soviet Sphere, the United States' economy collapses and goes bankrupt and loses its position as a superpower, and most European countries become communist afterward in the 1980s and 1990s, including France and Italy. A hundred years later, communism has taken over nearly every world country (including the United States itself). Capitalism at large has largely been killed off, though small ventures of capitalism had to be kept as a necessary evil. Religion, despite communism's taboo against it, has been relatively untouched in countries such as Italy, where even the staunchest Italian communist was known to attend a Catholic Mass.

The protagonists of the novel, Gianfranco and Annarita, are teenagers in the Italian People's Republic, now a satellite state of the USSR. Amidst the grey Soviet Brutalist tenements, they discover a strategy game shop that is disseminating capitalist ideas with the games they sell. The shop is a front for the Crosstime Traffic trading monopoly, as the protagonists discover when the shop is closed by the authorities and one of the clerks, Eduardo, turns to the protagonists for help.
