= Roma Eterna =

2003 novel by Robert Silverberg

- First edition
- Author: Robert Silverberg
- Cover artist: Chris Moore
- Language: English
- Genre: Science fiction, alternate history
- Publisher: Eos Books
- Publication date: 2003
- Publication place: United States
- Media type: Print (hardback & paperback)
- Pages: 416
- ISBN: 0-380-97859-8
- OCLC: 50774346
- Dewey Decimal: 813/.54 21
- LC Class: PS3569.I472 R6 2003

Roma Eterna is a science fiction fixup novel by American writer Robert Silverberg, published in 2003, which presents an alternative history in which the Roman Empire survives to the present day. Each of the ten chapters was first published as a short story, six of them in Asimov's Science Fiction, between 1989 and 2003.

== Plot introduction ==
The point of divergence is the failure of the Israelite Exodus from Egypt. Moses and many of the Israelites drowned, and the remnant, led by Aaron, were fetched back to slavery in Egypt, a traumatic event recorded for posterity in the Book of Aaron, an alternate version of the Bible. Later, the Hebrews were freed from bondage and remained a distinct religious-ethnic minority in Egypt, practicing a monotheistic religion, up to the equivalent of our 20th century (the 27th century of the Roman calendar).

Still, affairs of the larger world and the rise and fall of empires and cultures remained roughly the same as in our history until the division of the Roman Empire, which was never Christianised in this history. Mutual assistance between the Western and the Eastern Roman Empire against barbarian invasions preserved both from falling and kept Roman rule intact throughout the imperial dominions.

Despite the absence of Christianity, which, in our history, considerably influenced early Islam, Muhammad still started his prophetic career but was assassinated by a perceptive Roman agent, nipping Islam in the bud and thus precluding the spread of any monotheistic religion through the Roman Empire. Monotheism remained limited to the specific Hebrew sect in Egypt.

== Plot summary ==
The novel is presented as a series of vignettes over a period of about 1500 years, from Ab Urbe Condita 1282 (AD 529) to AUC 2723 (AD 1970). Most of the story-chapters involve Roman politics, either the competition between the Western and Eastern Empires to dominate the other or the violent creation of the Second Roman Republic in about AUC 2603 (AD 1850). Others describe the first Roman circumnavigation of the world and unsuccessful attempts to conquer Nova Roma (Central America).

Many features of our own history are repeated in this history, though under changed circumstances: the equivalent of the 16th and 17th centuries have bold navigators and adventurers, romanticised by later generations but unpleasantly brutal and ruthless when looked at closely; in the late 18th to mid-19th centuries, a decadent old order is overthrown by revolution followed by a reign of terror and the reemergence of Republicanism; though Italy remains a central part of the Roman Empire, the Latin dialect spoken there develops into a kind of Italian, and the name "Marcus" changes into "Marco"; though Vienna is a provincial capital which never had an Emperor of its own, its population dances the Waltz; by the 20th century, people travel by cars rather than carriages and by the second half of the century, space flight is achieved.

It concludes with the first story to be written, when a group of Hebrew citizens in Alexandria prepare to depart Earth in a rocket which explodes shortly after takeoff. But they will try again, still believing God chose them to inherit the Promised Land, just not on Rome-dominated Earth.

== Chapters ==
The book consists of a prologue and ten chapters (Gregorian calendar year):

- AUC 1203: Prologue (AD 450)
- AUC 1282: With Caesar in the Underworld (529)
- AUC 1365: A Hero of the Empire (612)
- AUC 1861: The Second Wave (1108)
- AUC 1951: Waiting for the End (1198)
- AUC 2206: An Outpost of the Realm (1453)
- AUC 2543: Getting to know the Dragon (1790)
- AUC 2568: The Reign of Terror (1815)
- AUC 2603: Via Roma (1850)
- AUC 2650: Tales from the Venia Woods (1897)
- AUC 2723: To the Promised Land (1970)

== Literary significance and reception ==
The book received a share of negative criticism. It was accused by Claude Lalumière in The Montreal Gazette of concentrating too much on the upper class and not drawing a detailed picture of Roman life and its change through the ages. The only story in the book to receive true praise from reviewer Alma A. Hromic of SFSite is the last chapter, To the Promised Land, which incidentally, does not deal with Romans or the upper class of the Empire.

Five of the stories in the series, "Waiting for the End," "Getting to Know the Dragon," "A Hero of the Empire," "With Caesar in the Underworld," and "The Reign of Terror" were nominated for the Sidewise Award for Alternate History upon their original publications, although none of the stories won.

== Publication history ==
=== As short stories ===
Original short stories first publication.

- "To the Promised Land" (Omni, May 1989)
- "Tales from the Venia Woods" (The Magazine of Fantasy & Science Fiction, October 1989)
- "An Outpost of the Empire" (Isaac Asimov's Science Fiction Magazine, November 1991)
- "Via Roma" (Asimov's Science Fiction, April 1994)
- "Waiting for the End" (Asimov's Science Fiction, October/November 1998)
- "Getting to Know the Dragon" (Far Horizons: All New Tales from the Greatest Worlds of Science Fiction, May 1999)
- "A Hero of the Empire" (The Magazine of Fantasy & Science Fiction, October–November 1999)
- "The Second Wave" (Asimov's Science Fiction, August 2002)
- "With Caesar in the Underworld" (Asimov's Science Fiction, October/November 2002)
- "The Reign of Terror" (Asimov's Science Fiction, April 2003)

=== As a single book ===
Hardback

- June 2003, publisher: Eos, ISBN 0-380-97859-8, United States edition
- August 2003, publisher: Gollancz, ISBN 0-575-07353-5, UK edition

Paperback

- April 2004, publisher: Eos, ISBN 0-380-81488-9, USA edition
- July 2004, publisher: Gollancz, ISBN 0-575-07556-2, UK edition

== See also ==
- Agent of Byzantium
- Germanicus trilogy
- Gunpowder Empire
- Lest Darkness Fall
- Romanitas/Rome Burning
- Warlords of Utopia
