= The Disunited States of America =

2006 novel by Harry Turtledove

- First edition
- Author: Harry Turtledove
- Cover artist: The Studio Dog and Harald Sund
- Language: English
- Series: Crosstime Traffic
- Genre: Alternate history
- Publisher: Tor Books
- Publication date: September 5, 2006
- Publication place: United States
- Media type: Print (Hardback & Paperback)
- Pages: 288
- ISBN: 0-7653-1485-1
- OCLC: 65302467
- Dewey Decimal: 813/.54 22
- LC Class: PS3570.U76 D58 2006
- Preceded by: In High Places
- Followed by: The Gladiator

The Disunited States of America is an alternate history novel by Harry Turtledove. It is a part of the Crosstime Traffic series, and takes place in an alternate world where the U.S. was never able to agree on a constitution and continued to govern under the Articles of Confederation. By the early 19th century, the nation dissolved with each state as a separate country. The states trade with each other, engage in diplomacy, and even go to war with each other. Other states exist which do not in our world, such as Boone.

== Plot summary ==
The story takes place in the 2090s and concerns two outsiders caught up in a war between Ohio and Virginia: a young girl from California visiting relatives with her grandmother, and a boy from our world's Crosstime Traffic trading firm.

== Development ==
One of the pre-publication title candidates was The Untied States of America.

== Literary significance and reception ==
Frieda Murray reviewing for Booklist said that this novel was "the best so far in this Turtledove series, with characters that you care about and action that, while grim, is plausible and engaging." Publishers Weekly in their review said "Turtledove delivers lessons on racism and diplomacy for a young adult audience."

== See also ==
- GURPS Infinite Worlds § Gallatin
- Russian Amerika
- The Forest of Time
