= Crosstime Traffic =

Sci-fi book series

The Crosstime Traffic Series
- First edition dust-jacket of Gunpowder Empire
- Gunpowder Empire (2003); Curious Notions (2004); In High Places (2005); The Disunited States of America (2006); The Gladiator (2007); The Valley-Westside War (2008)
- Author: Harry Turtledove
- Country: United States
- Language: English
- Genre: Science fiction
- Publisher: Tor Books
- Published: 2003-2008
- Media type: Print

Crosstime Traffic is a series of books by Harry Turtledove.

The central premise of the stories is an Earth that has discovered access to alternate universes where history proceeded differently. "Crosstime Traffic" is the name of the company with a global monopoly on the technology.

== Background ==
The background strongly resembles that of H. Beam Piper's Paratime series and Keith Laumer's Imperium Series. One tribute paid to Piper's series is the names of the inventors of temporal transposition: Ghaldron and Hesthor in Piper, Galbraith and Hester in Turtledove. In all of the series the "home timeline" was running low on resources, and it has used its knowledge of time to covertly import supplies from other Earths and save their civilization from collapse. The most important difference is the nature of the home timeline. Piper's world was inhabited by a culture which had been technologically advanced for thousands of years and was even more distantly related to our own. Laumer's series had a civilization that was less advanced than our own in almost every way except for their travel technology. Turtledove's world, although set in the 2090s, resembles the 2010s of the real world, with modest general advances in technology including the crosstime capability, as well as inflation resulting in US$100 (nicknamed 'franklins') having the same buying power as US$1 in the 2010s.

The books are young adult novels with teenage protagonists, who frequently become stranded in dangerous alternate worlds and must adapt to survive. Their adventures give them increased appreciation for the benefits of living in a civilized, high-tech society. Invariably, each book has two viewpoint characters, a boy and a girl—different ones in each book; in most books one of them is from the home timeline and the other from a visited alternate. Except for "Gunpowder Empire", where the protagonists are siblings, love interest developing between the protagonists is invariably part of the plot. In two books it ends with successful consummation, the protagonist from an Alternate timeline getting exceptional permission to come to the Home Timeline; in one book, lovers must say goodbye with a tearful heartbreak; and circumstances in one make it end with boy and girl becoming staunch foes, despite their mutual attraction.

While there is considerable violence, the language and plots are restricted by the intended audience. For instance, In High Places includes the prospect of an enslaved girl being sexually abused, but does not use the word "rape" (although the word is later used in The Valley-Westside War). This shows considerable restraint of the author Turtledove, who is famous for writing scenes of unfettered sexuality, violence and profanity in his adult novels such as the series of Worldwar, Southern Victory, and The War That Came Early.

== Novels ==
- Gunpowder Empire (2003): The first book in the series, it involves a pair of siblings stranded during a siege of an outpost of a Roman Empire that never collapsed.
- Curious Notions (2004): The second book in the series is about a teenager and his father who are running an electronics store in San Francisco in a world where Imperial Germany reigns supreme following its victories in all three World Wars during the first half of the twentieth century.
- In High Places (2005): Takes place in a world where the Black Death killed four-fifths of Europe's population, and the Moors still occupy Spain and southern France as well as Italy, and the Industrial Revolution never happened.
- The Disunited States of America (2006): This book concerns a pair of teenagers, one from the Crosstime civilization, one a native, who meet in a Virginia where the United States fell apart in the early 1800s due to the Constitutional Convention failing, in a North America torn by war between numerous independent states. The working title for this book was The Untied States of America.
- The Gladiator (2007): This novel is set in a world dominated by Communism after the Soviet Union won the Cold War in the late 20th century. In Italy, two teenagers chafe under the deadening rule of communism—until they discover the existence of Crosstime Traffic through a strategy gaming shop which is not as it seems.
- The Valley-Westside War (2008): The sixth book in the series, set in Los Angeles a world in which nuclear warfare took place in 1967. Los Angeles and the rest of the United States are split into numerous tiny republics, kingdoms, city states, and such, we are told a story of when the Kingdom of the Valley invaded the Democracy of Westside.

== See also ==
- GURPS Infinite Worlds
