= The Light Bearer =

1994 Novel by Donna Gillespie

- Author: Donna Gillespie
- Cover artist: Steve Assel
- Language: English
- Genre: Historical novel
- Publisher: The Berkley Publishing Group ISBN 0-425-14368-6 ("The Light Bearer," first US edition; Berkley, 1994, trade paperback) ISBN 0-340-60922-2 "The Light Bearer," first British edition, Hodder and Stoughton, 1994, trade paperback ISBN 3-8105-0887-X "Mondfeuer;" or Fire from the Moon; first German edition, translated by Manfred Ohl; S. Fischer, 1994, hardback ISBN 90-225-2066-8 "Auriane, Dochter van het Licht," or Auriane, Daughter of Light, first Dutch edition, translated by Ineke van Bronswijk; De Boekerij, 1996 hardback ISBN 978-88-7424-578-9 "La Luce del Nord," or Light of the North, first Italian edition, translated by Elisa Canuti; Aliberti Editore, 2010; trade paperback
- Publication date: Sept 1994
- Publication place: United States
- Media type: Print (Paperback)
- Pages: 788 pp
- OCLC: 59904503
- Followed by: Lady of the Light

The Light Bearer is a 1994 historical novel by Donna Gillespie set in first century Rome, during the reigns of the Emperors Nero and Domitian. The novel centers upon three historical events: the Emperor Domitian’s war with the Germanic Chattian tribe in 83 A.D.; the inauguration of the Colosseum, or Amphitheatrum Flavium; and the assassination of Domitian. In dramatizing the assassination, the author follows the details given by first-century Roman historian Suetonius.

== Plot summary ==
The fictional protagonists are a proto-Germanic tribeswoman, Auriane, daughter of a Chattian war leader; and Marcus Arrius Julianus, a Roman senator and imperial advisor whose character and circumstances are loosely based on the Roman philosopher Seneca, as well as another contemporary in the reign of Nero, Stoic philosopher and statesman Helvidius Priscus, a man known for his outspokenness in public life. Rome’s interference in tribal affairs compel Auriane to take the warrior’s oath and lead her father’s retinue after his death. In Rome, Stoic humanist Marcus Julianus reaches the highest levels of government, where he is taken into the confidence of the Emperor Domitian. Through political maneuvering, he attempts to check the excesses of the increasingly corrupt Emperor Domitian. Auriane is captured in Domitian's Chattian War and taken to Rome. As Domitian's reign of terror begins, Julianus orchestrates a plot to assassinate the Emperor; here the author has inserted a fictional character into a gap left by history. The Emperor Domitian, who according to Suetonius, was fond of pitting women against dwarfs in the arena, condemns Auriane to a gladiatorial school. Here Auriane discovers the tribesman who betrayed her people in war. As Julianus’ assassination plot reaches its conclusion, Auriane must carry out the tribal rite of vengeance in the Colosseum.

== Reception ==
The book has sold over 350,000 copies worldwide, and has been translated into German, Dutch, Russian and Italian. In 1994-95 it spent 18 weeks on Germany’s Buchreport bestseller list. In 2001, The Light Bearer was optioned by Hallmark Entertainment for a four-hour television miniseries that was not produced. In general, reviews were positive; it received a “starred” review in Publishers Weekly. On Dec. 1, 1994, Brian Jacomb of Washington Post Book World said of The Light Bearer:

Much has been written of the cold-blooded shenanigans of the Roman way of life, but Gillespie weaves her tale in a way that brings new color and excitement to the era … There are no flat passages in The Light Bearer, only a fast-flowing stream that erupts into a full-scale torrent in the book's conclusion."

On the other hand, Kirkus Reviews remarked, "Earnest ambitions, but essentially a protracted, middling love story."

== See also ==
- Chatti#In popular culture
- Nero in popular culture#Literature
- Fiction set in Ancient Rome
- Geoff Taylor
- Domitian#Literature
