= Romanitas (novel) =

2005 novel by Sophia McDougall

- Author: Sophia McDougall
- Language: English
- Genre: Alternate history novel
- Publisher: Orion Books
- Publication date: 2005
- Publication place: United Kingdom
- Media type: Print (Hardback & Paperback)
- Pages: 448 pp (first edition, hardback)
- ISBN: 0-7528-6078-X (first edition, hardback)
- OCLC: 58554243
- Followed by: Rome Burning

Romanitas is an alternate history novel by Sophia McDougall, published by Orion Books. It is the first of a trilogy of novels based on a world in which the Roman Empire survives in contemporary times and now dominates much of the world. The point of divergence is the assassination of Emperor Pertinax in 193; in this alternate timeline, the assassination plot is thwarted and Pertinax introduces a series of reforms that enable the Roman Empire to survive into the modern era.

Romanitas was nominated for the Sidewise Award for Alternate History in 2005.

== Plot summary ==
After attending his parents' funeral, Marcus Novius Faustus Leo, the teenage nephew of the emperor (and heir apparent since the death of his father), is informed by his father's secretary Varius that his father Leo and his mother were murdered by a conspiracy concerned about Leo's ambition to abolish slavery. While this is happening, Varius' wife eats sweets given to Marcus by his cousin Makaria and dies of poisoning. Varius promptly arranges for Marcus to flee to a hidden refuge in Spain, run by Delir, an anti-slavery activist and secret ally of Leo. Meanwhile, a British slave named Una, who has the ability to read minds, rescues her brother Sulien who has been falsely accused of rape and sentenced to crucifixion.

The three runaways meet in Gaul. Despite initial suspicion, they agree to help each other and travel to the refuge. However, Varius has been arrested and the conspirators force him to reveal the location of the refuge, as well as making him confess to the murder of Marcus's parents, as well as the murder of Marcus himself.

Upon discovering that Varius has confessed to murdering him and his parents, Marcus decides to go to Rome to reveal he is in fact still alive, planning to reveal the conspiracy in public so the conspirators will be unable to kill him. He runs away from the refuge and travels to Rome, evading the soldiers sent to capture him. Una and Sulien follow him, but are unable to find him in time to prevent him revealing himself. Marcus reveals himself but is captured and taken to a hospital. There he is injected with a hallucinogen by one of the conspirators so that when Emperor Faustus is taken to him, Marcus appears to be mad. As many of the Imperial family have succumbed to a hereditary madness in the past (including, apparently, Marcus' other uncle, Lucius), Faustus agrees to keep Marcus in seclusion.

The runaway slaves make it to Rome, and manage to rescue Marcus from the asylum where he is being held. Thereafter, Marcus succeeds in revealing the truth about Varius' innocence to the emperor, as well as the plot to kill him. Makaria manages to exculpate herself from any involvement in the conspiracy, pouring suspicion onto the emperor's current wife, Tulliola.

== See also ==
- Agent of Byzantium
- Germanicus trilogy
- Gunpowder Empire
- Lest Darkness Fall
- Roma Eterna
- Rome Burning
- Warlords of Utopia
