= Simon Turney =

English historical novelist

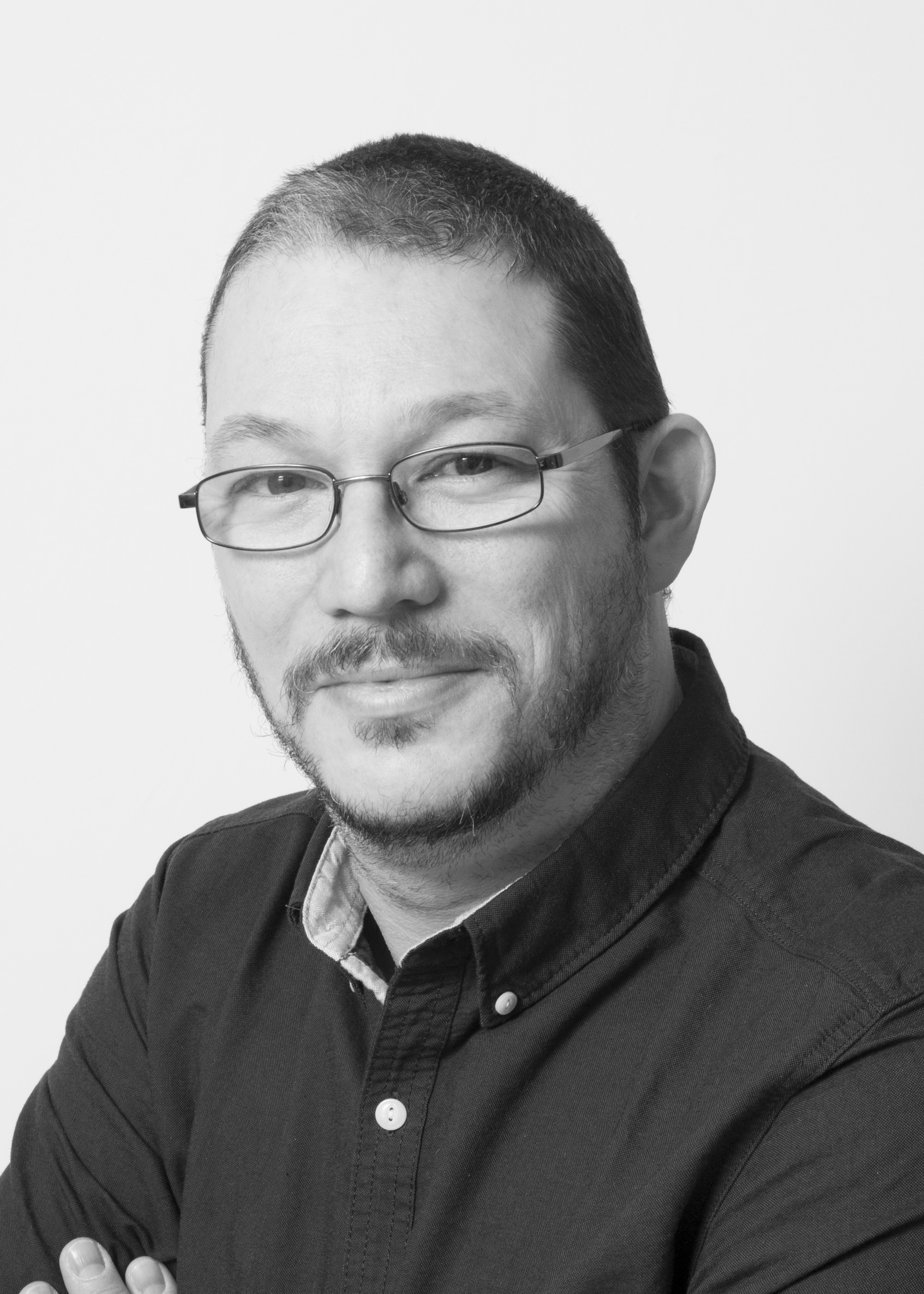
- Born: Ripon, England
- Occupation: Writer
- Writing career
- Period: 2010–present
- Genre: Historical novel
- Website: simonturney.com

Simon Turney is an English historical novelist with releases centered around Antiquity and Roman Times, the Knights Templar, and the early Ottoman Empire, writing often under the pseudonym SJA Turney.

== Biography ==
Turney worked in a variety of fields before returning to university to complete an honours degree in classical history through the Open University In his spare time, he wrote the first Marius' Mules novel, a tale based upon the Gallic Wars of Julius Caesar, and with it enjoyed initial self-published success before moving into mainstream releases. A former re-enactor with the Deva Victrix Roman group in Chester, Turney is also a Roman historian and public speaker on the classical world, with a biography of the general Gnaeus Julius Agricola due for release in 2021. Now, with in excess of 40 novels, Turney is a prolific author, spanning such genres as historical fantasy, historical mysteries and historical biography, as well as releasing novels both independently and through publishers like Canelo and Orion Publishing Group. He writes full-time and is represented by MMB Literary Agency. He lives with his wife, children, rabbits and dog in rural North Yorkshire.

== Bibliography ==
=== Series as "S J A Turney" ===
==== Marius' Mules ====
1. The Conquest of Gaul aka The Invasion of Gaul (2009)
2. The Belgae (2010)
3. Gallia Invicta (2011)
4. Conspiracy of Eagles (2012)
5. Hades' Gate (2013)
6. Caesar's Vow (2014)
7. The Great Revolt (2014)
8. Sons of Taranis (2015)
9. Pax Gallica (2016)
10. Fields of Mars (2017)
11. Tides of War (2018)
12. Sands of Egypt (2019)
13. Civil War (2020)
14. The Last Battle (2021)
15. The Ides of March (2023)
16. Sertorius’ Ghost (2025)

A short story, Prelude to War, set in 53-52 BC, was also released in 2014.

==== Tales of the Empire ====
- Emperor's Bane (2016)
1. Interregnum (2009)
2. Ironroot (2010)
3. Dark Empress (2011)
4. Insurgency (2016)
5. Invasion (2017)
6. Jade Empire (2017)

==== Ottoman Cycle ====
1. The Thief's Tale (2013)
2. The Priest's Tale (2013)
3. The Assassin's Tale (2014)
4. The Pasha's Tale (2015)

==== Praetorian ====
1. The Great Game (2015)
2. The Price of Treason (2015)
3. Eagles of Dacia (2017)
4. Lions of Rome (2019)
5. The Cleansing Fire (2020)
6. Blades of Antioch (2021)
7. The Nemesis Blade (2024)

==== Roman Adventure ====
1. Crocodile Legion (2016)
2. Pirate Legion (2017)

==== Knights Templar ====
1. Daughter of War (2018)
2. The Last Emir (2018)
3. City of God (2019)
4. The Winter Knight (2019)
5. The Crescent and the Cross (2020)
6. The Last Crusade (2021)

==== Wolves of Odin ====
1. Blood Feud (2022)
2. The Bear of Byzantium (2022)
3. Iron and Gold (2022)
4. Wolves Around the Throne (2023)
5. Loki Unbound (2024)
6. Kings of Stone and Ice (2025)

==== Damned Emperors ====
- as S.J.A. Turney
1. Domitian (2022)
2. Caracalla (2023)
- as Simon Turney
1. Caligula (2018)
2. Commodus (2019)

=== Series as "Simon Turney" ===
==== Agricola ====
1. Agricola: Invader (2024)
2. Agricola: Warrior (2025)
3. Agricola: Commander (2025)
4. Agricola: Conqueror (2026)

==== Rise of Emperors (with Gordon Doherty) ====
1. Sons of Rome (2020)
2. Masters of Rome (2021)
3. Gods of Rome (2021)

=== Standalone novels ===
- Para Bellum (2023)
- Terra Incognita (2024)
- A Year of Ravens (2015) (with Ruth Downie, Stephanie Dray, E Knight, Kate Quinn, Vicky Alvear Shecter and Russell Whitfield)
- A Song of War (2016) (with Christian Cameron, Libbie Hawker, Kate Quinn, Vicky Alvear Shecter, Stephanie Thornton and Russell Whitfield)

=== Non-fiction works ===
1. Agricola (2022)
2. The Roman Auxiliary Units of Britain (2024)
3. Child: Marcus Turney (2010)
