= Gordon Doherty =

Scottish novelist

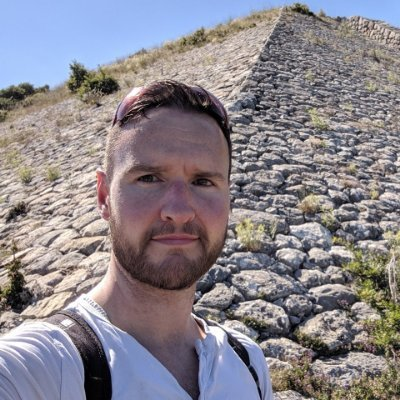
- Doherty at Hattusa in 2019
- Born: 20 February 1978 (age 48); Glasgow, UK
- Occupation: Novelist
- Writing career
- Period: 2011–present
- Website: gordondoherty.co.uk

Gordon Doherty is a Scottish historical novelist whose works centre mainly on classical antiquity.

== Biography ==
Graduating from university with a degree in physics, Gordon pursued a career in the science and technology sector. In his spare time, he studied history voraciously, and began working on his first Legionary novel - set in the late Roman Empire on the cusp of the Great Migration that would see many tribes including the Huns arrive at the empire's doorstep. Launched in 2011 during the self-publishing boom, Legionary proved to be a great success, and a launch pad for Gordon's writing career. He has gone on to write over twenty further novels, set in the Roman Empire, Byzantium, Classical Greece and the Bronze Age. These have been released worldwide both independently and through publishers like HarperCollins, Penguin, Head of Zeus, and Canelo, and his works have been translated into more than seventeen different languages along the way. Gordon now writes full-time and is represented by Watson, Little Ltd Literary Agency. He lives near the ruins of the Antonine Wall.

== Bibliography ==
=== Series ===
==== Legionary ====
- Eagles in the Desert (2020)
1. Legionary (2011)
2. Viper of the North (2012)
3. Land of the Sacred Fire (2013)
4. The Scourge of Thracia (2015)
5. Gods & Emperors (2015)
6. Empire of Shades (2017)
7. The Blood Road (2018)
8. Dark Eagle (2020)
9. The Emperor's Shield (2023)
10. Devotio (2025)

==== Strategos ====
1. Born in the Borderlands (2011)
2. Rise of the Golden Heart (2013)
3. Island in the Storm (2014)

==== Empires of Bronze ====
1. Son of Ishtar (2019)
2. Dawn of War (2020)
3. Thunder at Kadesh (2020)
4. The Crimson Throne (2021)
5. The Shadow of Troy (2021)
6. The Dark Earth (2022)

==== Age of Attila ====
1. The Eagle & the Wolf (2026)

==== Rise of Emperors ====
(with Simon Turney)

1. Sons of Rome (2020)
2. Masters of Rome (2021)
3. Gods of Rome (2021)

=== Series contributed to ===
==== Assassin's Creed ====
- Assassin's Creed Odyssey (2018)

==== HWA Short Story Collection ====
- Rubicon (2019) (with Nick Brown, Ruth Downie, Richard Foreman, Alison Morton, Anthony Riches, Antonia Senior, Peter Tonkin and L J Trafford)
