= Michael Curtis Ford =

American novelist

Michael Curtis Ford is an American historical novelist, writing novels about Ancient Rome and Ancient Greece. He has worked variously as a laborer, a ski patrolman, a musician, a consultant, a banker, a Latin teacher, and a translator. He holds degrees in Economics and Linguistics and lives in Oregon, where he and his wife homeschool their three children. He has also written numerous articles on ancient military themes.

Contrary to popular conception, he did not write the books: The Fire of Ares, Birth of a Warrior, and Legacy of Blood. On his website he states- "regarding the subject matter of my 'next book', The Fire of Ares: Spartan Quest: very sorry to disappoint, but that is not my next book! After some investigation, I have found that Fire of Ares is apparently a 'young adult'-level book written by a British author with a name disconcertingly similar to my own, Michael Ford."

== Novels ==
- The Ten Thousand: A Novel of Ancient Greece (2001)
- Gods and Legions: A Novel of the Roman Empire (2002)
- The Last King: Rome's Greatest Enemy (2004)
- The Sword of Attila: A Novel of the Last Years of Rome (2005)
- The Fall of Rome: A Novel of a World Lost (2007)
