= Warlords of Utopia =

2004 science fiction novel by Lance Parkin

- Author: Lance Parkin
- Cover artist: Steve Johnson
- Language: English
- Series: Faction Paradox
- Genre: Science fiction
- Publisher: Mad Norwegian Press
- Publication date: 2004
- Publication place: United States
- Media type: Print (Trade Paperback)
- Pages: 192 pp
- ISBN: 0-9725959-6-1
- OCLC: 149250339
- Preceded by: Of the City of the Saved...
- Followed by: Warring States

Warlords of Utopia is an original novel by Lance Parkin set in the Faction Paradox universe.

Parkin developed the idea for a Doctor Who book that was not published. The published version is his second attempt to write it for Faction Paradox. The first was turned down by editor Lawrence Miles.

== Plot introduction ==
The glorious Roman Empire has ruled for nearly 27 centuries when Marcus Americanius Scriptor acquires a strange bracelet from a mysterious stranger. With the bracelet, he finds that he is able to travel to alternate Romes in worlds where the course of history has diverged from the one with which he is familiar. Worlds he finds later have no Roman Empire at all, and a cruel new regime in Germania on a path of conquest. That leads to a conflict between all the parallel universes in which Rome never fell and all those in which the Nazis won World War II.

== See also ==
- Agent of Byzantium
- Germanicus trilogy
- Gunpowder Empire
- Lest Darkness Fall
- Roma Eterna
- Romanitas
