= The Two Georges =

1995 novel by Harry Turtledove and Richard Dreyfuss

- First edition (UK)
- Author: Harry Turtledove and Richard Dreyfuss
- Language: English
- Genre: Alternate History, Mystery, Steampunk
- Publisher: Hodder & Stoughton (UK); Tor Books (US)
- Publication date: 1995 (UK); March 1996 (US)
- Publication place: United Kingdom
- Media type: Print (Paperback and hardcover)
- Pages: 608
- ISBN: 0-340-62825-1

The Two Georges is an alternate history and detective thriller novel co-written by science fiction author Harry Turtledove and Oscar-winning actor Richard Dreyfuss. It was originally published in 1995 by Hodder & Stoughton in the United Kingdom, and in 1996 by Tor Books in the United States, and was nominated for the 1995 Sidewise Award for Alternate History.

== Background ==
The flag used in the world of The Two Georges resembles the US 'Continental Union Flag'. In the world of The Two Georges, it was retained permanently as the 'Jack and Stripes', the flag of the North American Union inside the British Empire

For more than two centuries, what would have become the continental United States and Canada has been the North American Union, a self-governing dominion within the British Empire; Alaska remains under the rule of Russia while Hawaii is a British protectorate. The title of the novel refers to a fictional Gainsborough painting that commemorates the agreement between George Washington and King George III in the 1760s, which peacefully averted the American Revolution, implied to be the result of George Grenville never becoming Prime Minister (and thus never implementing the Stamp Act). The painting itself has become a symbol of national unity.

Native Americans fared much better than in real-world history with tribes such as the Iroquois and the Cherokee managing to keep much of their land and have autonomy, their status comparable to that of the princely states in British India.

As the North American Union remained in the British Empire following peaceful negotiation, the French Revolution was suppressed at the storming of the Bastille by troops under the command of Napoleon Bonaparte in the service of Louis XVI, thus preserving the Bourbon monarchy. By the twentieth century, France and Spain exist in a French-dominated personal union, the Holy Alliance, which controls most of Latin America and Northern Africa and is ruled over by François IV.

The abolition of slavery in the British Empire in 1833 included slaves in North America. The emancipated blacks prospered, gained education and experienced a rapid upward social mobility, becoming a mainly middle class community by the 20th century. Conversely, the Irish-American community remained a predominantly poor, working class population, subsisting on hard physical labor such as the coal mining on which the North American Union depended for its energy. This created a feeling of bitter jealousy among the Irish, and many of them came to support the Sons of Liberty, a terrorist organization that wants to see America become independent from the British Empire and promotes a blatantly racist and xenophobic ideology.

In the twentieth century, the empires of Great Britain, the Holy Alliance and Russia are the world's major powers, with the Austrian Empire being a European land-based middle power coveting Balkan territory, and neither Germany nor Italy becoming unified nation-states.

As in the Mexican War of our history, the mid-nineteenth century saw Britain and the North American Union conquer a large portion of Nueva España (in this case, also including the Baja California peninsula) from the Holy Alliance. The city of Los Angeles was renamed New Liverpool and developed into one of the largest cities of the North American Union and the Province of Upper California.

== Plot ==
The Two Georges, being displayed in New Liverpool, is stolen while a crowd is distracted by the murder of 'Honest' Dick (a.k.a. 'Tricky' Dick), the Steamer King, a nationally known used car salesman. In its place is left a gramophone with a recording of the "Yankee Doodle," a notorious subversive song serving as the anthem of the Sons of Liberty.

Colonel Thomas Bushell of the Royal American Mounted Police leads the search for the painting, accompanied by its former curator (and his eventual love interest) Dr. Kathleen Flannery and Captain Samuel Stanley. Some days later, a ransom note is received from the Sons of Liberty. The Governor-General of the North American Union, Sir Martin Luther King, informs Bushell in confidence that the painting must be recovered before King-Emperor Charles III's state visit, or the government will have to pay the Sons' ransom demand of fifty million pounds.

The search takes Bushell, Flannery, and Stanley across the country via airship (an advanced form of dirigible), train, and steamer. They also meet many members of the Sons of Liberty, including sensationalist newspaper editor John F. Kennedy.

After chasing many false leads and the wrong suspects, Bushell and his associates arrive at Victoria (the nation's capital, on the south side of the Potomac River across from Georgetown, Maryland); during a reception at the Russian Embassy, Bushell encounters his ex-wife Irene, who had an affair with and subsequently married Sir David Clarke, Governor-General King's chief of staff. The Two Georges is found undamaged in a self-storage facility an hour before the King arrives. They also uncover the true culprits: the Holy Alliance and Bushell's superior officer and covert Sons of Liberty operative, Lieutenant General Sir Horace Bragg, who believed that emancipation was an injustice to his formerly slave-holding family. Bushell then thwarts Bragg's attempts to assassinate the King, first by gunfire then by a bomb concealed in the frame of The Two Georges. When Bragg is arrested and awaiting trial, he and Bushell argue over the outcomes of a potential war against the Holy Alliance and a resultant American separatist uprising caused by the theft of the painting. Later, Bushell and Stanley are both knighted by King Charles for their accomplishments.

== Reception ==
The Houston Chronicle listed The Two Georges as one of many pieces of fiction that have pictured African Americans as the head of the executive branch, in this case Sir Martin Luther King, Governor General of North America. Publishers Weekly praises the novel's "recognizable yet delightfully distorted" world where "engaging characters play out a suspenseful and satisfying story". School Library Journal described the novel as "a fast-paced and gripping story."

== Reviews ==
- Dragon

== Similar themes in other works ==
Washington's Dirigible, part of John Barnes' Timeline Wars series, has a similar theme: a resourceful time traveler manages to get Benjamin Franklin appointed as the tutor of the young George III – making him a liberal-minded King, well-disposed towards the North American colonists. The result, as in The Two Georges, is an alternate history timeline in which the American War of Independence is averted and North America remains part of the British Empire, although with a great deal of autonomy.
