= Sophia McDougall =

British writer

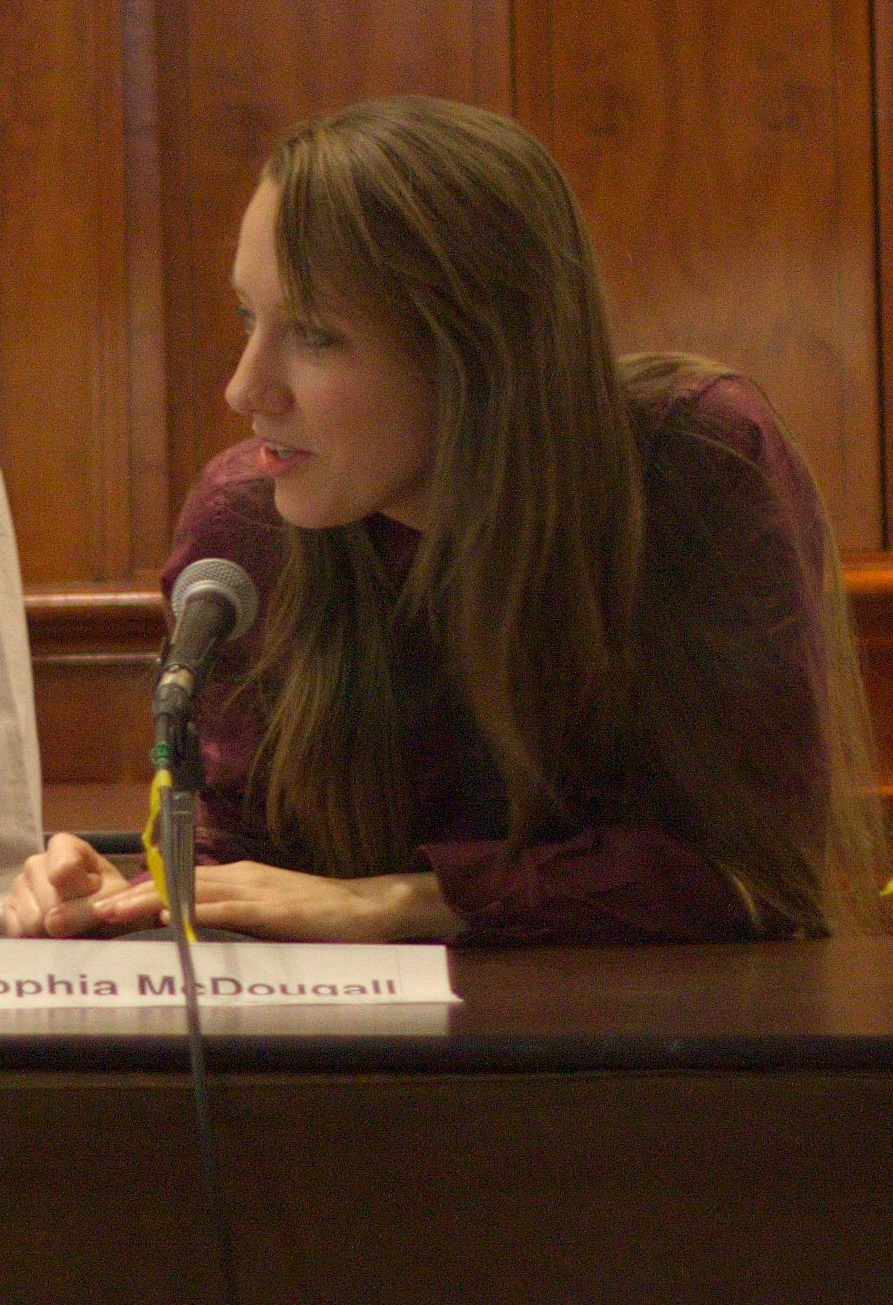
- at Eastercon 2012
- Born: London, England
- Occupation: Novelist
- Writing career
- Genres: Science fiction, Drama
- Website: sophia-mcdougall.com

Sophia McDougall is a British novelist, playwright, and poet. She is best known as the author of the Romanitas trilogy of alternate history novels, as well as the children's book Mars Evacuees. She has also written several widely cited essays on gender issues for New Statesman, including "The Rape of James Bond" and "I Hate Strong Female Characters".

== Life and career ==
McDougall is best known internationally as the author of alternate history novels published by Orion Publishing Group and based on the premise that the Roman Empire survived to contemporary times. She studied English at Oxford University and lives in Feltham in London.

== Books ==
=== Romanitas trilogy ===
- Romanitas (2005), Orion Books – ISBN 0-7528-6078-X
- Rome Burning (2007), Orion Books – ISBN 0-7528-6079-8
- Savage City (2010), Orion Books – ISBN 0-7528-6080-1

=== Other novels ===
- Mars Evacuees (2014), Egmont – ISBN 1-4052-6867-0
- Space Hostages (2017)
