= Kirk Mitchell =

American author (born 1950)

- Born: 1950 (age 75–76)
- Occupation: Author

Kirk Mitchell (born 1950) is an American author who is known for his time travel, alternate history, historical fiction, and adventure fiction novels. Mitchell has also created several novelizations of movies.

Earlier in his career, Mitchell worked as a law enforcement officer.

== Books ==
- A. D. Anno Domini (1984)
- The Delta Force (1986) (as Joel Norst - pseudonym)
- Lethal Weapon (1987) (as Joel Norst)
- Never the Twain (1987)
- Black Dragon (1988)
- Colors (1988) (as Joel Norst)
- Mississippi Burning (1989) (as Joel Norst)
- With Siberia Comes a Chill (1990)
- Backdraft (1991)
- Shadow on the Valley (1993)
- Blown Away (1994)
- High Desert Malice (1995)
- Deep Valley Malice (1996)
- Fredericksburg: A Novel of the Irish At Marye's Heights (1996)
- Cry Dance (1999)
- Spirit Sickness (2000)
- Ancient Ones (2001)
- Sky Woman Falling (2003)
- Dance of the Thunder Dogs (2004)
- Under the Killer Sun: A Death Valley Mystery (2011)

=== Alternate History ===
The Germanicus trilogy is a collection of books following the adventures of Roman Emperor Germanicus Julius Agricola Aztecus Caesar in an alternate universe where Rome never fell.

- Procurator (novel) (1984)
- The New Barbarians (1986)
- Cry Republic (1989)
