= Harry Turtledove =

American author (born 1949)

- Turtledove at Hugo Award 2026
- Born: June 14, 1949 (age 77); Los Angeles, California, U.S.
- Education: California Institute of Technology (dropped out); University of California, Los Angeles (BA, PhD)
- Occupations: Novelist; short story author; essayist; historian
- Writing career
- Pen name: Dan Chernenko, Eric G. Iverson, Mark Gordian, H. N. Turteltaub
- Period: 1979–present
- Genres: Science fiction, fantasy, alternate history, historical fiction, history
- Notable works: Southern Victory; Worldwar; Crosstime Traffic; The Guns of the South; The Two Georges
- Website: www.stevenhsilver.com/turtledove.html

Harry Norman Turtledove (born June 14, 1949) is an American historian and author who is best known for his work in the genres of alternate history, historical fiction, fantasy, science fiction, and mystery fiction. He lives in Southern California.

In addition to his birth name, Turtledove writes under a number of pen names: Eric Iverson, H. N. Turteltaub, Dan Chernenko, and Mark Gordian. He began publishing novels in the realm of fantasy starting in 1979 and continues to write in the 2020s.

== Early life ==
Turtledove was born in Los Angeles, California, on June 14, 1949, and grew up in Gardena, California. His paternal grandparents, who were Romanian Jews, had first emigrated to Winnipeg, Manitoba, before moving to California. He was educated in local public schools during his early life.

After dropping out during his freshman year at California Institute of Technology, Turtledove attended the University of California, Los Angeles, where he completed his undergraduate degree and received a PhD in Byzantine history in 1977. His dissertation was entitled The Immediate Successors of Justinian: A Study of the Persian Problem and of Continuity and Change in Internal Secular Affairs in the Later Roman Empire During the Reigns of Justin II and Tiberius II Constantine (AD 565–582).

== Career ==
Turtledove published his first two novels, Wereblood and Werenight, in 1979 under the pseudonym "Eric G. Iverson". He later explained that his editor at Belmont Tower did not think that people would believe the author's real name was "Turtledove" and came up with something more Nordic. He continued to use "Iverson" until 1985. Another early pseudonym was "Mark Gordian".

That year, he published Herbig-Haro and And So to Bed under his real name. In 1998, he began publishing historical novels under the pseudonym "H. N. Turteltaub" (Turteltaube means turtle dove in German). He published three books as "Dan Chernenko" (the Scepter of Mercy series).

He has written several works in collaboration, including The Two Georges with Richard Dreyfuss, "Death in Vesunna" with his first wife, Betty Turtledove (pen name: Elaine O'Byrne); Household Gods with Judith Tarr; and others with Susan Shwartz, S. M. Stirling, and Kevin R. Sandes.

Turtledove won the Homer Award for Short Story in 1990 for "Designated Hitter", the John Esten Cooke Award for Southern Fiction in 1993 for The Guns of the South, and the Hugo Award for Novella in 1994 for Down in the Bottomlands. Must and Shall was nominated for the 1996 Hugo Award and Nebula Award for Best Novelette and received an honorable mention for the 1995 Sidewise Award for Alternate History. The Two Georges also received an honorable mention for the 1995 Sidewise Award for Alternate History.

His Worldwar series received a Sidewise Award for Alternate History Honorable Mention in 1996. In 1998, his novel How Few Remain won the Sidewise Award for Alternate History. He won his second Sidewise Award in 2003 for his novel Ruled Britannia. He won his third Sidewise Award for his short story "Zigeuner” and his fourth for his short story "Christmas Truce".

Turtledove won the Prometheus Award for Best Novel in 1998 for The Gladiator.

On August 1, 1998, Turtledove was named honorary Kentucky Colonel as guest of honor at Rivercon XXIII in Louisville, Kentucky. His The Gladiator was the cowinner of the 2008 Prometheus Award.

Turtledove served as the toastmaster for Chicon 2000, the 58th World Science Fiction Convention.

Publishers Weekly dubbed Turtledove "The Master of Alternate History". Within the genre, he is known for creating original alternate history scenarios, such as survival of the Byzantine Empire or an alien invasion during the middle of the Second World War. In addition, he has been credited with giving original treatment to alternate themes that had been dealt with by many others, such as the victory of the South in the American Civil War or the victory of Nazi Germany during the Second World War. His novels have been credited with bringing alternate history into the mainstream.
