= Alternate history =

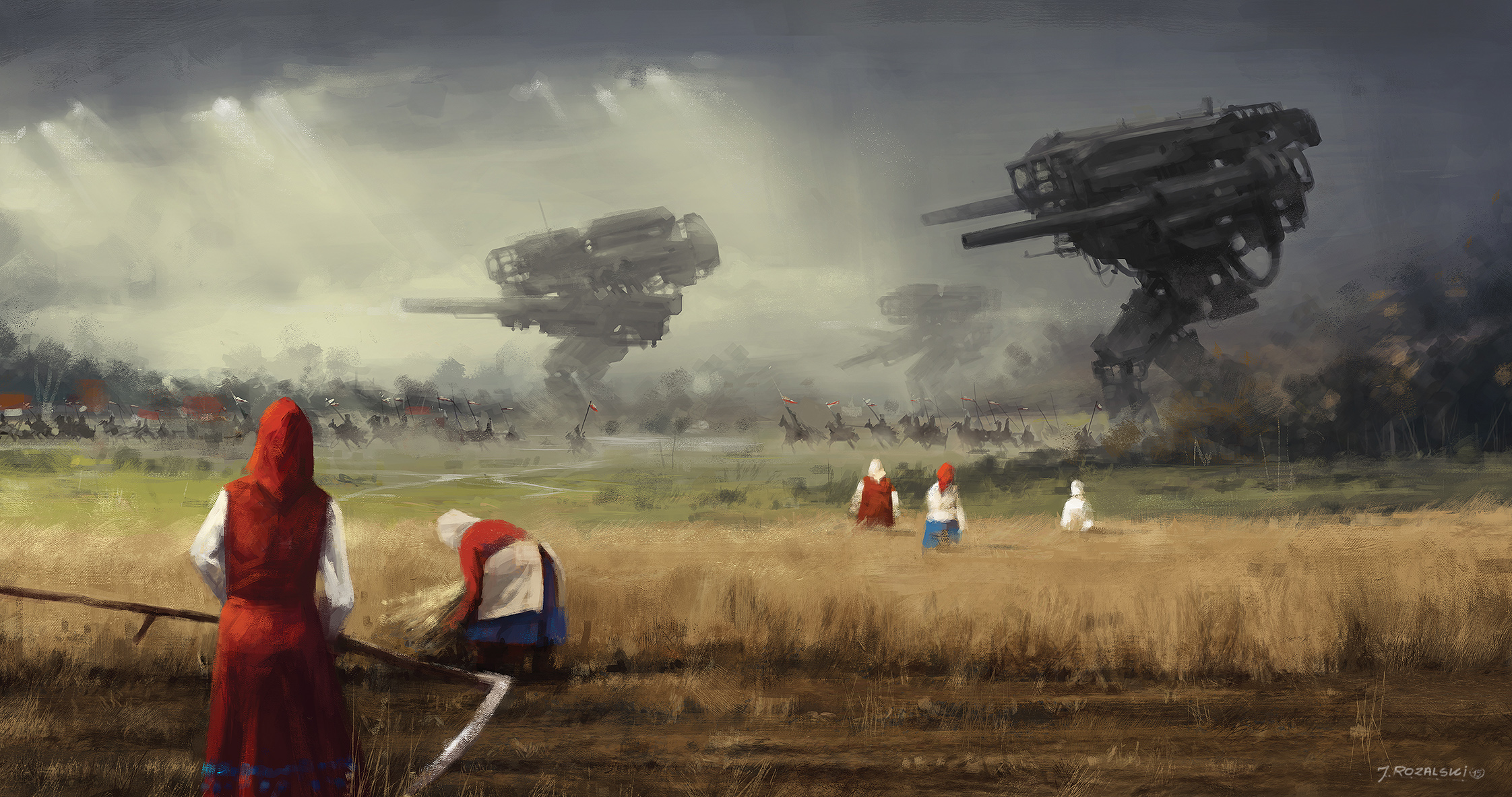
A painting by Jakub Różalski depicts an alternative history of the 1920s in Scythe, in which rural peasants must contend with giant mechanical walking tanks.

Alternate history (also alternative history, allohistory, althist, or simply A.H.) is a subgenre of speculative fiction in which one or more historical events happen differently than they did in reality.

As conjecture grounded in historical fact, alternate history stories explore "what if?" scenarios about pivotal events in human history and depict outcomes diverge significantly from the historical record. These works typically feature a point of divergence (POD) from recorded history, a change that alters the subsequent course of events, and the resulting ramifications. Some alternate histories are considered a subgenre of science fiction or historical fiction.

Since the 1950s, many works in the genre have incorporated tropes such as time travel between timelines, psychic awareness of parallel universes, or the splitting of history into separate timestreams.

== Definition ==
Alternate history (also called alternative history) is a genre of speculative fiction in which one or more historical events occur differently from how they did in actual history. The genre commonly explores "what if" scenarios involving pivotal points in human history.

An alternate history generally requires three elements:

- A point of divergence (often abbreviated as PoD) from the historical record, occurring at a time before the story is written;
- A change that would alter the subsequent course of history; and
- An examination of the consequences or ramifications of that divergence.

Works of fiction set in the past or present, but written before that time period - such as the novels 2001: A Space Odyssey (1968) by Arthur C. Clarke and 1984 (1949) by George Orwell, or the film 2012 (2009) - are sometimes mistakenly identified as alternate history. These works do not diverge from the historical record as it was known at the time of their creation.

Alternative history is similar to but distinct from secret history, which can be either fictional or non-fictional and recounts events that occurred in history (whether real or imagined) but which had no apparent effect on the recorded historical outcome. It is also thematically related to, but distinct from, counterfactual history, which is a form of historiography that explores what might have happened in order to better understand why events unfolded as they actually did.

== History of literature ==
=== Antiquity and medieval ===
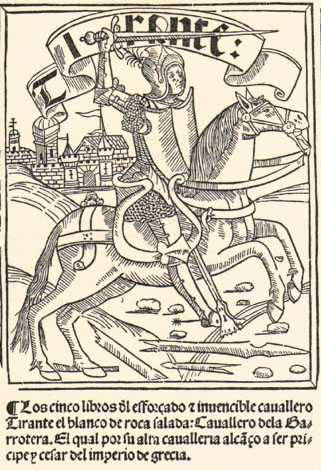
Title page of the first Spanish-language translation of Joanot Martorell's Tirant lo Blanch (originally in Catalan)

Speculative and counterfactual thinking about historical events appears in some of the earliest works of Western historiography. One of the earliest known examples is found in the Roman historian Livy's Ab Urbe Condita Libri (Book IX, sections 17–19). Livy contemplated an alternative 4th century BC in which Alexander the Great had survived to invade Europe as planned. He asks what would have happened if Rome had faced Alexander in war and concludes that the Romans would likely have defeated him.

An even earlier instance of speculative material appears in Herodotus's Histories.

In the 11th century, the theologian and Doctor of the Church Peter Damian explored a philosophical form of counterfactual speculation in his work De Divina Omnipotentia. While discussing the limits of God's omnipotence, he considered whether God could alter past events, such as making it so that Rome had never been founded.

One of the earliest works of fiction with clear alternate-history elements is Joanot Martorell's 1490 epic romance Tirant lo Blanch. Written when the fall of Constantinople to the Turks was still a recent and traumatic memory for Christian Europe, the novel depicts a Breton knight, Tirant, who aids the remnants of the Byzantine Empire and successfully repels the invading Ottoman forces of Mehmet II, preventing the city's fall to Islamic conquest.

=== 19th century ===
One of the earliest works of alternate history to reach a large audience was Louis Geoffroy's Histoire de la Monarchie universelle: Napoléon et la conquête du monde (1812–1832) (History of the Universal Monarchy: Napoleon and the Conquest of the World) (1836). The novel imagines Napoleon's First French Empire victorious in the French invasion of Russia (1812) and in an invasion of England in 1814, eventually unifying the world under Bonaparte's rule.

In English, the first known complete alternate history is Nathaniel Hawthorne's short story "P.'s Correspondence", published in 1845. It depicts a man deemed mad for perceiving a different 1845 in which long-dead figures, including poets Robert Burns, Lord Byron, Percy Bysshe Shelley, and John Keats, actor Edmund Kean, British politician George Canning, and Napoleon, are still alive.

The first novel-length alternate history in English is Castello Holford's Aristopia (1895). Unlike the nationalistic tone of Geoffroy's work, Aristopia portrays a utopian society: the earliest settlers in Virginia discover a reef of solid gold and are able to build a Utopian society in North America.

=== Early 20th century and the era of the pulps ===
In 1905, H. G. Wells published A Modern Utopia. As explicitly noted in the book itself, Wells's main aim in writing it was to set out his social and political ideas, the plot serving mainly as a vehicle to expound them. This book introduced the idea of a person being transported from a point in our familiar world to the precise geographical equivalent point in an alternate world in which history had gone differently. The protagonists undergo various adventures in the alternate world, and then are finally transported back to our world, again to the precise geographical equivalent point. Since then, that has become a staple of the alternate history genre.

A number of alternate history stories and novels appeared in the late 19th and early 20th centuries (see, for example, Joseph Edgar Chamberlin's The Ifs of History [1907] and Charles Petrie's If: A Jacobite Fantasy [1926]). In 1931, British historian Sir John Squire collected a series of essays from some of the leading historians of the period for his anthology If It Had Happened Otherwise. In that work, scholars from major universities, as well as important non-academic authors, turned their attention to such questions as "If the Moors in Spain Had Won" and "If Louis XVI Had Had an Atom of Firmness". The essays range from serious scholarly efforts to Hendrik Willem van Loon's fanciful and satiric portrayal of an independent 20th-century New Amsterdam, a Dutch city-state on the island of Manhattan. Among the authors included were Hilaire Belloc, André Maurois, and Winston Churchill.

One of the entries in Squire's volume was Churchill's "If Lee Had Not Won the Battle of Gettysburg", written from the viewpoint of a historian in a world in which the Confederacy had won the American Civil War. The entry considers what would have happened if the North had been victorious (in other words, a character from an alternate world imagines a world more like the real one we live in, although it is not identical in every detail). Speculative work that narrates from the point of view of an alternate history is variously known as "recursive alternate history", a "double-blind what-if", or an "alternate-alternate history". Churchill's essay was one of the influences behind Ward Moore's alternate history novel Bring the Jubilee in which General Robert E. Lee won the Battle of Gettysburg and paved the way for the eventual victory of the Confederacy in the American Civil War (named the "War of Southron Independence" in this timeline). The protagonist, the autodidact Hodgins Backmaker, travels back to the aforementioned battle and inadvertently changes history, which results in the emergence of our own timeline and the consequent victory of the Union instead.

The American humorist author James Thurber parodied alternate history stories about the American Civil War in his 1930 story "If Grant Had Been Drinking at Appomattox", which he accompanied with this very brief introduction: "Scribner's magazine is publishing a series of three articles: 'If Booth Had Missed Lincoln', 'If Lee Had Won the Battle of Gettysburg', and 'If Napoleon Had Escaped to America'. This is the fourth".

Another example of alternate history from this period (and arguably the first that explicitly posited cross-time travel from one universe to another as anything more than a visionary experience) is H.G. Wells' Men Like Gods (1923) in which the London-based journalist Mr. Barnstable, along with two cars and their passengers, is mysteriously teleported into "another world", which the "Earthlings" call Utopia. Being far more advanced than Earth, Utopia is some 3000 years ahead of humanity in its development. Wells describes a multiverse of alternative worlds, complete with the paratime travel machines that would later become popular with American pulp writers. However, since his hero experiences only a single alternate world, the story is not very different from conventional alternate history.

In the 1930s, alternate history moved into a new arena. The December 1933 issue of Astounding published Nat Schachner's "Ancestral Voices", which was quickly followed by Murray Leinster's "Sidewise in Time" (1934). While earlier alternate histories examined reasonably-straightforward divergences, Leinster attempted something completely different. In his "World gone mad", pieces of Earth traded places with their analogs from different timelines. The story follows Professor Minott and his students from a fictitious Robinson College as they wander through analogues of worlds that followed a different history. "Sidewise in Time" has been described as "the point at which the alternate history narrative first enters science fiction as a plot device" and is the story for which the Sidewise Award for Alternate History is named.

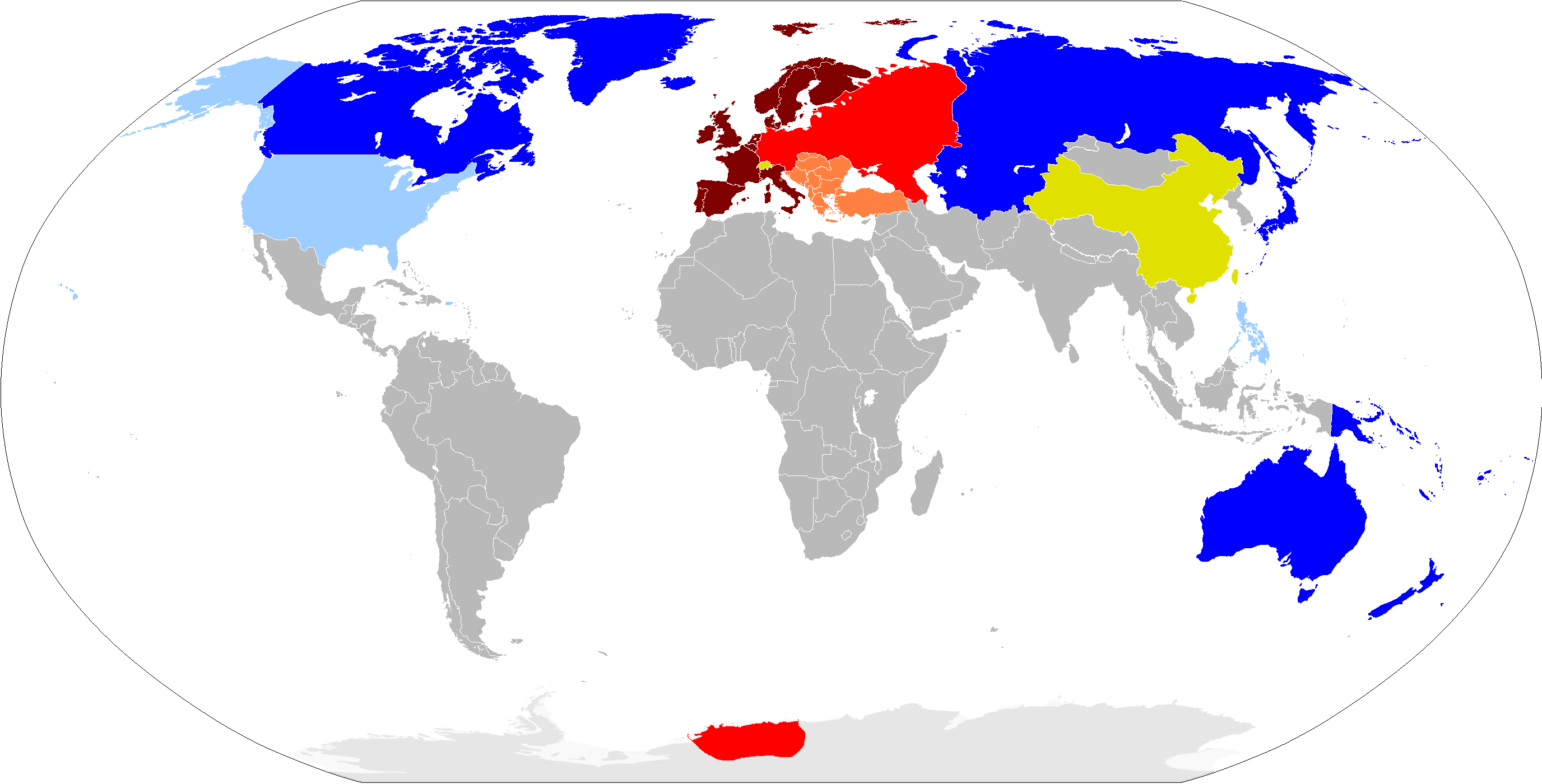
The world in 1964 in the novel Fatherland in which the Nazis won World War II. Germany and its sphere of influence are in red; the United States and its sphere of influence in blue; China and Switzerland in yellow

A somewhat similar approach was taken by Robert A. Heinlein in his 1941 novelette Elsewhen in which a professor trains his mind to move his body across timelines. He then hypnotizes his students so that they can explore more of them. Eventually, each settles into the reality that is most suitable for him or her. Some of the worlds they visit are mundane, some are very odd, and others follow science fiction or fantasy conventions.

World War II produced alternate history for propaganda: both British and American authors wrote works depicting Nazi invasions of their respective countries as cautionary tales.

==== Time travel to create historical divergences ====
The period around World War II also saw the publication of the time travel novel Lest Darkness Fall by L. Sprague de Camp in which an American academic travels to Italy at the time of the Byzantine invasion of the Ostrogoths. De Camp's time traveler, Martin Padway, is depicted as making permanent historical changes and implicitly forming a new time branch, thereby making the work an alternate history.

In William Tenn's short story Brooklyn Project (1948), a tyrannical US Government brushes aside the warnings of scientists about the dangers of time travel and goes on with a planned experiment - with the result that minor changes to the prehistoric past cause Humanity to never have existed, its place taken by tentacled underwater intelligent creatures - who also have a tyrannical government which also insists on experimenting with time-travel.

In Ray Bradbury's classic short story "A Sound of Thunder" (1952) a group of hunters travel to the Late Cretaceous to hunt dinosaurs whose death would not be considered consequential as they are about to die a natural death within two minutes of the encounter. To minimize risking changes history they are told to stay on a levitating antigravity path that touches nothing. However one of the hunters stumbles off the path, inadvertently crushing a butterfly. When the group returns they find that history became significantly harsher and a fascist is now President.

Time travel as the cause of a point of divergence (POD), which can denote either the bifurcation of a historical timeline or a simple replacement of the future that existed before the time-travelling event, has continued to be a popular theme. In Ward Moore's Bring the Jubilee (1953), the protagonist lives in an alternate history in which the Confederacy has won the American Civil War. He travels backward through time and brings about a Union victory at the Battle of Gettysburg.

When a story's assumptions about the nature of time travel lead to the complete replacement of the visited time's future, rather than just the creation of an additional time line, the device of a "time patrol" is often used where guardians move through time to preserve the "correct" history.

A more recent example is Making History by Stephen Fry in which a time machine is used to alter history so that Adolf Hitler was never born. That ironically results in a more competent leader of Nazi Germany and results in the country's ascendancy and longevity in the altered timeline.

==== Quantum theory of many worlds ====
While many justifications for alternate histories involve a multiverse, the "many world" theory would naturally involve many worlds, in fact a continually exploding array of universes. In quantum theory, new worlds would proliferate with every quantum event, and even if the writer uses human decisions, every decision that could be made differently would result in a different timeline. A writer's fictional multiverse may, in fact, preclude some decisions as humanly impossible, as when, in Night Watch, Terry Pratchett depicts a character informing Vimes that while anything that can happen, has happened, nevertheless there is no history whatsoever in which Vimes has ever murdered his wife. When the writer explicitly maintains that all possible decisions are made in all possible ways, one possible conclusion is that the characters were neither brave, nor clever, nor skilled, but simply lucky enough to happen on the universe in which they did not choose the cowardly route, take the stupid action, fumble the crucial activity, etc.; few writers focus on this idea, although it has been explored in stories such as Larry Niven's story All the Myriad Ways, where the reality of all possible universes leads to an epidemic of suicide and crime because people conclude their choices have no moral import.

In any case, even if it is true that every possible outcome occurs in some world, it can still be argued that traits such as bravery and intelligence might still affect the relative frequency of worlds in which better or worse outcomes occurred (even if the total number of worlds with each type of outcome is infinite, it is still possible to assign a different measure to different infinite sets). The physicist David Deutsch, a strong advocate of the many-worlds interpretation of quantum mechanics, has argued along these lines, saying that "By making good choices, doing the right thing, we thicken the stack of universes in which versions of us live reasonable lives. When you succeed, all the copies of you who made the same decision succeed too. What you do for the better increases the portion of the multiverse where good things happen." This view is perhaps somewhat too abstract to be explored directly in science fiction stories, but a few writers have tried, such as Greg Egan in his short story The Infinite Assassin, where an agent is trying to contain reality-scrambling "whirlpools" that form around users of a certain drug, and the agent is constantly trying to maximize the consistency of behavior among his alternate selves, attempting to compensate for events and thoughts he experiences, he guesses are of low measure relative to those experienced by most of his other selves.

Many writers—perhaps the majority—avoid the discussion entirely. In one novel of this type, H. Beam Piper's Lord Kalvan of Otherwhen, a Pennsylvania State Police officer, who knows how to make gunpowder, is transported from our world to an alternate universe where the recipe for gunpowder is a tightly held secret and saves a country that is about to be conquered by its neighbors. The paratime patrol members are warned against going into the timelines immediately surrounding it, where the country will be overrun, but the book never depicts the slaughter of the innocent thus entailed, remaining solely in the timeline where the country is saved.

The cross-time theme was further developed in the 1960s by Keith Laumer in the first three volumes of his Imperium sequence, which would be completed in Zone Yellow (1990). Piper's politically more sophisticated variant was adopted and adapted by Michael Kurland and Jack Chalker in the 1980s; Chalker's G.O.D. Inc trilogy (1987–89), featuring paratime detectives Sam and Brandy Horowitz, marks the first attempt at merging the paratime thriller with the police procedural. Kurland's Perchance (1988), the first volume of the never-completed "Chronicles of Elsewhen", presents a multiverse of secretive cross-time societies that utilize a variety of means for cross-time travel, ranging from high-tech capsules to mutant powers. Crosstime Traffic is a 6-book series written by Harry Turtledove aimed at teenagers featuring a variant of H. Beam Piper's paratime trading empire. While the home timeline appears to be the same in each of the books there is no overlap in characters or repetition of the alternative worlds.

==== Rival paratime worlds ====
The concept of a cross-time version of a world war, involving rival paratime empires, was developed in Fritz Leiber's Change War series, starting with the Hugo Award winning The Big Time (1958); followed by Richard C. Meredith's Timeliner trilogy in the 1970s, Michael McCollum's A Greater Infinity (1982) and John Barnes' Timeline Wars trilogy in the 1990s.

Such "paratime" stories may include speculation that the laws of nature can vary from one universe to the next, providing a science fictional explanation—or veneer—for what is normally fantasy. Aaron Allston's Doc Sidhe and Sidhe Devil take place between our world, the "grim world" and an alternate "fair world" where the Sidhe retreated to. Although technology is clearly present in both worlds, and the "fair world" parallels our history, about fifty years out of step, there is functional magic in the fair world. Even with such explanation, the more explicitly the alternate world resembles a normal fantasy world, the more likely the story is to be labelled fantasy, as in Poul Anderson's "House Rule" and "Loser's Night". In both science fiction and fantasy, whether a given parallel universe is an alternate history may not be clear. The writer might allude to a POD only to explain the existence and make no use of the concept, or may present the universe without explanation of its existence.

=== Major writers explore alternate histories ===
Isaac Asimov's short story "What If—" (1952) is about a couple who can explore alternate realities by means of a television-like device. This idea can also be found in Asimov's novel The End of Eternity (1955), in which the "Eternals" can change the realities of the world, without people being aware of it. Poul Anderson's Time Patrol stories feature conflicts between forces intent on changing history and the Patrol who work to preserve it. One story, Delenda Est, describes a world in which Carthage triumphed over the Roman Republic. The Big Time, by Fritz Leiber, describes a Change War ranging across all of history.

Keith Laumer's Worlds of the Imperium is one of the earliest alternate history novels; it was published by Fantastic Stories of the Imagination in 1961, in magazine form, and reprinted by Ace Books in 1962 as one half of an Ace Double. Besides our world, Laumer describes a world ruled by an Imperial aristocracy formed by the merger of European empires, in which the American Revolution never happened, and a third world in post-war chaos ruled by the protagonist's doppelganger.

A map of the United States as depicted in The Man in the High Castle TV series, based on Philip K. Dick's The Man in the High Castle

Philip K. Dick's novel, The Man in the High Castle (1962), is an alternate history in which Nazi Germany and Imperial Japan won World War II from Franklin D. Roosevelt being assassinated. This book contains an example of "alternate-alternate" history, in that one of its characters authored a book depicting a reality in which the Allies won the war, itself divergent from real-world history in several aspects. Several characters live within a divided United States, in which the Empire of Japan takes the Pacific states, governing them as a puppet nation, Nazi Germany takes the East Coast of the United States and parts of the Midwest, with the remnants of the old United States' government as the Neutral Zone, a buffer state between the two superpowers. The book has inspired an Amazon series of the same name.

Vladimir Nabokov's novel, Ada or Ardor: A Family Chronicle (1969), is a story of incest that takes place within an alternate North America settled in part by Czarist Russia and that borrows from Dick's idea of "alternate-alternate" history (the world of Nabokov's hero is wracked by rumors of a "counter-earth" that apparently is ours). Some critics believe that the references to a counter-earth suggest that the world portrayed in Ada is a delusion in the mind of the hero (another favorite theme of Dick's novels). Strikingly, the characters in Ada seem to acknowledge their own world as the copy or negative version, calling it "Anti-Terra", while its mythical twin is the real "Terra". Like history, science has followed a divergent path on Anti-Terra: it boasts all the same technology as our world, but all based on water instead of electricity; e.g., when a character in Ada makes a long-distance call, all the toilets in the house flush at once to provide hydraulic power.

Guido Morselli described the defeat of Italy (and subsequently France) in World War I in his novel, Past Conditional (1975; Contro-passato prossimo), wherein the static Alpine front line which divided Italy from Austria during that war collapses when the Germans and the Austrians forsake trench warfare and adopt blitzkrieg twenty years in advance.

Kingsley Amis set his novel, The Alteration (1976), in the 20th century, but major events in the Reformation did not take place, and Protestantism is limited to the breakaway Republic of New England. Martin Luther was reconciled to the Roman Catholic Church and later became Pope Germanian I.

In Nick Hancock and Chris England's 1997 book What Didn't Happen Next: An Alternative History of Football it is suggested that, had Gordon Banks been fit to play in the 1970 FIFA World Cup quarter-final, there would have been no Thatcherism and the post-war consensus would have continued indefinitely.

Kim Stanley Robinson's novel, The Years of Rice and Salt (2002), starts at the point of divergence with Timur turning his army away from Europe, and the Black Death has killed 99% of Europe's population, instead of only a third. Robinson explores world history from that point in AD 1405 (807 AH) to about AD 2045 (1467 AH). Rather than following the great man theory of history, focusing on leaders, wars, and major events, Robinson writes more about social history, similar to the Annales School of history theory and Marxist historiography, focusing on the lives of ordinary people living in their time and place.

Philip Roth's novel, The Plot Against America (2004), looks at an America where Franklin D. Roosevelt is defeated in 1940 in his bid for a third term as President of the United States, and Charles Lindbergh is elected, leading to a US that features increasing fascism and anti-Semitism.

Michael Chabon, occasionally an author of speculative fiction, contributed to the genre with his novel The Yiddish Policemen's Union (2007), which explores a world in which the State of Israel was destroyed in its infancy and many of the world's Jews instead live in a small strip of Alaska set aside by the US government for Jewish settlement. The story follows a Jewish detective solving a murder case in the Yiddish-speaking semi-autonomous city state of Sitka. Stylistically, Chabon borrows heavily from the noir and detective fiction genres, while exploring social issues related to Jewish history and culture. Apart from the alternate history of the Jews and Israel, Chabon also plays with other common tropes of alternate history fiction; in the book, Germany actually loses the war even harder than they did in reality, getting hit with a nuclear bomb instead of just simply losing a ground war (subverting the common "what if Germany won WWII?" trope).

=== Contemporary alternate history in popular literature ===
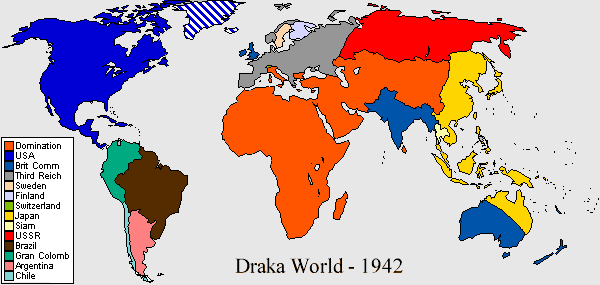
The world of 1942, as depicted at the start of S. M. Stirling's The Domination series

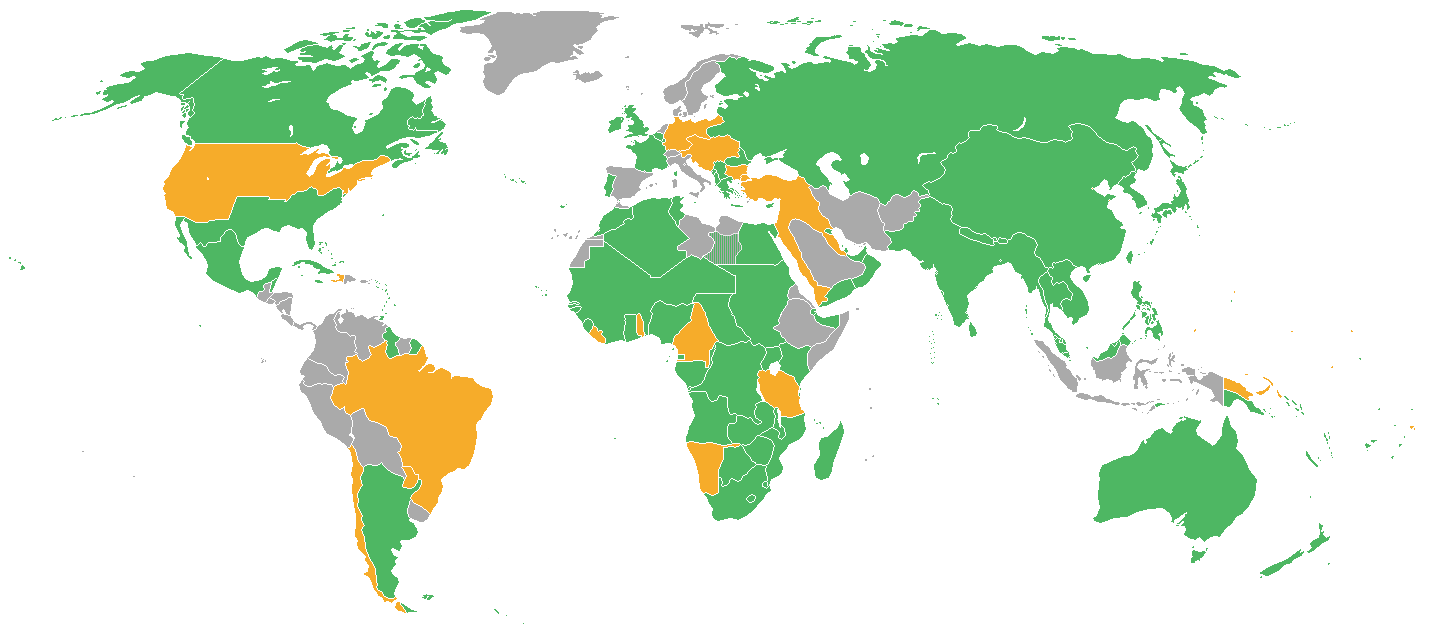
World War I from Harry Turtledove's Southern Victory ("Timeline 191") series

The late 1980s and the 1990s saw a boom in popular-fiction versions of alternate history, fueled by the emergence of the prolific alternate history author Harry Turtledove, as well as the development of the steampunk genre and two series of anthologies—the What Might Have Been series edited by Gregory Benford and the Alternate ... series edited by Mike Resnick. This period also saw alternate history works by S. M. Stirling, Kim Stanley Robinson, Harry Harrison, Howard Waldrop, Peter Tieryas, and others.

In 1986, a sixteen-part epic comic book series called Captain Confederacy began examining a world where the Confederate States of America won the American Civil War. In the series, the Captain and others heroes are staged government propaganda events featuring the feats of these superheroes.

Since the late 1990s, Harry Turtledove has been the most prolific practitioner of alternate history and has been given the title "Master of Alternate History" by some. His books include those of Timeline 191 (a.k.a. Southern Victory, also known as TL-191), in which, while the Confederate States of America won the American Civil War, the Union and Imperial Germany defeat the Entente Powers in the two "Great War"s of the 1910s and 1940s (with a Nazi-esque Confederate government attempting to exterminate its black population), and the Worldwar series, in which aliens invaded Earth during World War II. Other stories by Turtledove include A Different Flesh, in which the Americas were not populated from Asia during the last ice age; In the Presence of Mine Enemies, in which the Nazis won World War II; and Ruled Britannia, in which the Spanish Armada succeeded in conquering England in the Elizabethan era, with William Shakespeare being given the task of writing the play that will motivate the Britons to rise up against their Spanish conquerors. He also co-authored a book with actor Richard Dreyfuss, The Two Georges, in which the United Kingdom retained the American colonies, with George Washington and King George III making peace. He did a two-volume series in which the Japanese not only bombed Pearl Harbor but also invaded and occupied the Hawaiian Islands.

Perhaps the most incessantly explored theme in popular alternate history focuses on the aftermath of an Axis victory in World War II. In some versions, the Nazis and/or Axis powers win; or in others, they conquer most of the world but a "Fortress America" exists under siege; while in others, there is a Nazi/Japanese Cold War comparable to the US/Soviet equivalent in 'our' timeline. Fatherland (1992), by Robert Harris, is set in Europe following the Nazi victory. The novel Dominion by C.J. Sansom (2012) is similar in concept but is set in England, with Churchill the leader of an anti-German Resistance and other historic persons in various fictional roles. In the Mecha Samurai Empire series (2016), Peter Tieryas focuses on the Asian-American side of the alternate history, exploring an America ruled by the Japanese Empire while integrating elements of Asian pop culture like mechas and videogames.

Several writers have posited points of departure for such a world but then have injected time splitters from the future. For instance James P. Hogan's The Proteus Operation. Norman Spinrad wrote The Iron Dream in 1972, which is intended to be a science fiction novel written by Adolf Hitler after fleeing from Europe to North America in the 1920s.

In Jo Walton's "Small Change" series, the United Kingdom made peace with Hitler before the involvement of the United States in World War II, and slowly collapses due to severe economic depression. Former House Speaker Newt Gingrich and William R. Forstchen have written a novel, 1945, in which the US defeated Japan but not Germany in World War II, resulting in a Cold War with Germany rather than the Soviet Union. Gingrich and Forstchen neglected to write the promised sequel; instead, they wrote a trilogy about the American Civil War, starting with Gettysburg: A Novel of the Civil War, in which the Confederates win a victory at the Battle of Gettysburg - however, after Lincoln responds by bringing Grant and his forces to the eastern theater, the Army of Northern Virginia is soon trapped and destroyed in Maryland, and the war ends within weeks.

While World War II has been a common point of divergence in alternate history literature, several works have been based on other points of divergence. For example, Martin Cruz Smith, in his first novel, posited an independent American Indian nation following the defeat of Custer in The Indians Won (1970). Beginning with The Probability Broach in 1980, L. Neil Smith wrote several novels that postulated the disintegration of the US Federal Government after Albert Gallatin joins the Whiskey Rebellion in 1794 and eventually leads to the creation of a libertarian utopia. In the 2022 novel Poutine and Gin by Steve Rhinelander, the point of divergence is the Battle of the Plains of Abraham of the French and Indian War. That novel is a mystery set in 1940 of that time line.

A recent time traveling splitter variant involves entire communities being shifted elsewhere to become the unwitting creators of new time branches. These communities are transported from the present (or the near-future) to the past or to another timeline via a natural disaster, the action of technologically advanced aliens, or a human experiment gone wrong. S. M. Stirling wrote the Island in the Sea of Time trilogy, in which Nantucket Island and all its modern inhabitants are transported to Bronze Age times to become the world's first superpower. In Eric Flint's 1632 series, a small town in West Virginia is transported to 17th century central Europe and drastically changes the course of the Thirty Years' War, which was then underway. John Birmingham's Axis of Time trilogy deals with the culture shock when a United Nations naval task force from 2021 finds itself back in 1942 helping the Allies against the Empire of Japan and the Germans (and doing almost as much harm as good in spite of its advanced weapons). The series also explores the cultural impacts of people with 2021 ideals interacting with 1940s culture. Similarly, Robert Charles Wilson's Mysterium depicts a failed US government experiment which transports a small American town into an alternative version of the US run by Gnostics, who are engaged in a bitter war with the "Spanish" in Mexico (the chief scientist at the laboratory where the experiment occurred is described as a Gnostic, and references to Christian Gnosticism appear repeatedly in the book).

Although not dealing in physical time travel, in his alt-history novel Marx Returns, Jason Barker introduces anachronisms into the life and times of Karl Marx, such as when his wife Jenny sings a verse from the Sex Pistols's song "Anarchy in the U.K.", or in the games of chess she plays with the Marxes' housekeeper Helene Demuth, which on one occasion involves a Caro–Kann Defence. In her review of the novel, Nina Power writes of "Jenny's 'utopian' desire for an end to time", an attitude which, according to Power, is inspired by her husband's co-authored book The German Ideology. However, in keeping with the novel's anachronisms, the latter was not published until 1932. By contrast, the novel's timeline ends in 1871.

In the 2022 novel Hydrogen Wars: Atomic Sunrise by R.M. Christianson, a small change in post-war Japanese history leads to the election of General Douglas MacArthur as President of the United States. This minor change ultimately leads to all-out atomic war between the major Cold War powers.

Through crowdfunding on Kickstarter, Alan Jenkins and Gan Golan produced a graphic novel series called 1/6 depicting a dystopian alternate reality in which the January 6 United States Capitol attack was successful. What follows is the burning down of the Capitol building and the hanging of Vice President Mike Pence. Under Donald Trump's second term as president, a solid gold statue of him is erected and armed thugs patrol the streets of Washington, D.C. suppressing civilian resistance with brutal violence under the banner of the Confederate flag.

=== In fantasy genre ===
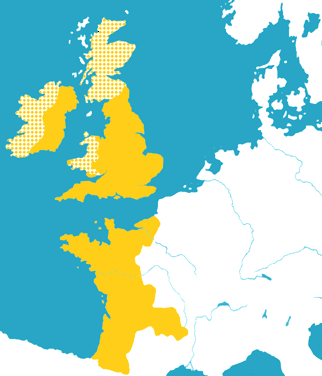
The Angevin Empire in 1172, before the point of divergence of Randall Garrett's Lord Darcy series

Many works of straight fantasy and science fantasy take place in historical settings, though with the addition of, for example, magic or mythological beasts. Some present a secret history in which the modern day world no longer believes that these elements ever existed. Many ambiguous alternate/secret histories are set in Renaissance or pre-Renaissance times, and may explicitly include a "retreat" from the world, which would explain the current absence of such phenomena. Other stories make plan a divergence of some kind.

In Poul Anderson's Three Hearts and Three Lions in which the Matter of France is history and the fairy folk are real and powerful. The same author's A Midsummer Tempest occurs in a world in which the plays of William Shakespeare (called here "the Great Historian"), presented the literal truth in every instance. The novel itself takes place in the era of Oliver Cromwell and Charles I. Here, the English Civil War had a different outcome, and the Industrial Revolution has occurred early.

Randall Garrett's "Lord Darcy" series presents a point of divergence: a monk systemizes magic rather than science, so the use of foxglove to treat heart disease is regarded as superstition. Another point of divergence occurs in 1199, when Richard the Lionheart survives the Siege of Chaluz and returns to England and makes the Angevin Empire so strong that it survives into the 20th century.

Jonathan Strange & Mr Norrell by Susanna Clarke takes place in an England where a separate Kingdom ruled by the Raven King and founded on magic existed in Northumbria for over 300 years. In Patricia Wrede's Regency fantasies, Great Britain has a Royal Society of Wizards.

The Tales of Alvin Maker series by Orson Scott Card (a parallel to the life of Joseph Smith, founder of the Latter Day Saint movement) takes place in an alternate America, beginning in the early 19th century. Prior to that time, a POD occurred: England, under the rule of Oliver Cromwell, had banished "makers", or anyone else demonstrating "knacks" (an ability to perform seemingly supernatural feats) to the North American continent. Thus the early American colonists embraced these gifts as perfectly ordinary, and counted on them as a part of their daily lives. The political division of the continent is considerably altered, with two large English colonies bookending a smaller "American" nation, one aligned with England, and the other governed by exiled Cavaliers. Actual historical figures are seen in a much different light: Ben Franklin is revered as the continent's finest "maker", George Washington was executed after being captured, and "Tom" Jefferson is the first president of "Appalachia", the result of a compromise between the Continentals and the British Crown.

On the other hand, when the "Old Ones" (fairies) still manifest themselves in England in Keith Roberts's Pavane, which takes place in a technologically backward world after a Spanish assassination of Elizabeth I allowed the Spanish Armada to conquer England, the possibility that the fairies were real but retreated from modern advances makes the POD possible: the fairies really were present all along, in a secret history.

Again, in the English Renaissance fantasy Armor of Light by Melissa Scott and Lisa A. Barnett, the magic used in the book, by Dr. John Dee and others, actually was practiced in the Renaissance; positing a secret history of effective magic makes this an alternate history with a point of departure. Sir Philip Sidney survives the Battle of Zutphen in 1586, and shortly thereafter saving the life of Christopher Marlowe.

When the magical version of our world's history is set in contemporary times, the distinction becomes clear between alternate history on the one hand and contemporary fantasy, using in effect a form of secret history (as when Josepha Sherman's Son of Darkness has an elf living in New York City, in disguise) on the other. In works such as Robert A. Heinlein's Magic, Incorporated where a construction company can use magic to rig up stands at a sporting event and Poul Anderson's Operation Chaos and its sequel Operation Luna, where djinns are serious weapons of war—with atomic bombs—the use of magic throughout the United States and other modern countries makes it clear that this is not secret history—although references in Operation Chaos to degaussing the effects of cold iron make it possible that it is the result of a POD. The sequel clarifies this as the result of a collaboration of Einstein and Planck in 1901, resulting in the theory of "rhea tics". Henry Moseley applies this theory to "degauss the effects of cold iron and release the goetic forces". This results in the suppression of ferromagnetism and the re-emergence of magic and magical creatures.

Alternate history shades off into other fantasy subgenres when the use of actual, though altered, history and geography decreases, although a culture may still be clearly the original source; Barry Hughart's Bridge of Birds and its sequels take place in a fantasy world, albeit one clearly based on China, and with allusions to actual Chinese history, such as the Empress Wu. Richard Garfinkle's Celestial Matters incorporates ancient Chinese physics and Greek Aristotelian physics, using them as if factual.

Alternate history has long been a staple of Japanese speculative fiction with such authors as Futaro Yamada and Ryō Hanmura writing novels set in recognizable historical settings with added supernatural or science fiction elements. Ryō Hanmura's 1973 Musubi no Yama Hiroku which recreated 400 years of Japan's history from the perspective of a secret magical family with psychic abilities. The novel has since come to be recognized as a masterpiece of Japanese speculative fiction. Twelve years later, author Hiroshi Aramata wrote the groundbreaking Teito Monogatari which reimagined the history of Tokyo across the 20th century in a world heavily influenced by the supernatural.

Disney's Pirates of the Caribbean series takes place in an alternate history. The filmmakers of The Curse of the Black Pearl made no secret about taking liberties with the time period in which their story takes place. Producer Jerry Bruckheimer explained that the film is a fantasy, but did want to be true to the overall feel of the era, paying particular attention to the years between 1720 and 1750 "in an effort to find an approximation". Director Gore Verbinski asserted that it takes place "roughly at the tail end of the Golden Age of Piracy, when the Morgans lived. Maybe the late 1720s." The crew went to great lengths to maintain authenticity, such as Jack Sparrow's sword being an original that dates from the 1750s. Ann C. Crispin knew about the Pirates universe being an alternate history writing the prequel novel The Price of Freedom, with Disney's instructions for Crispin being to "stick to historical fact, unless it conflicts with established Pirates of the Caribbean continuity". Crispin made a faithful effort to do this, having done plenty of research, with Under the Black Flag by David Cordingly being one of the four pirate-related books she found herself using the most consistently. According to production designer John Myhre, the filmmakers of the fourth film, On Stranger Tides, picked the date of 1750, or in the range of the mid-1700s. The film also featured Blackbeard, based on the historical figure and an element retained from the novel On Stranger Tides by Tim Powers. The history prior to On Stranger Tides is also slightly different from real-world history, with Blackbeard's death at Ocracoke Inlet in 1718 was considered a legend in the film, with Jack Sparrow saying he was beheaded, and that his headless body swam three times around his ship before climbing back on board. The fifth film, Dead Men Tell No Tales, also took place in the 1750s, with an early draft taking place sometime the Seven Years' War.

== Television ==
1983 is set on a world where the Iron Curtain never fell and the Cold War continues until the present (2003).

An Englishman's Castle tells the story of the writer of a soap opera in a 1970s England which lost World War II. England is run by a collaborator government which strains to maintain a normal appearance of British life. Slowly, however, the writer begins to uncover the truth.

The graphic novel and TV series, Chainsaw Man is set in an alternate timeline where the Soviet Union never dismantled and remains a global superpower.

In the Community episode "Remedial Chaos Theory", each of the six members of the study group rolls a die to decide who has to go downstairs to accept a pizza delivery for the group, creating 6 different alternative worlds. Characters from the worst universe, "darkest timeline", would later appear in the "prime universe".

Confederate was a planned HBO series set on a world where the south won the US Civil War. Social media backlash during pre-production led to the series being cancelled with no episodes produced.

Counterpart tells of a United Nations agency that is responsible for monitoring passage between alternative worlds. Two of the worlds, Alpha and Prime, are locked in a cold war.

The Court-Martial of George Armstrong Custer is a 1977 telemovie where George Custer survives the Battle of Little Bighorn and faces a court martial hearing over his incompetence.

C.S.A.: The Confederate States of America presents itself as a British TV documentary uncovering some of the dark secrets of the Confederacy on a world where the south won the US Civil War.

Dark Skies tells that much of history having been shaped since the 1940s by a government conspiracy with aliens. One race of aliens can take over humans, while those immune to the alien's control fight back.

Doctor Who's main character has visited two alternative worlds in the TV show and several in its spin off media. The Third Doctor visits a world with a fascist Great Britain on the brink of destruction in Inferno, while the Tenth Doctor visits a Britain that has a President and blimps are a common form of transportation beset by Cybermen in Rise of the Cybermen / The Age of Steel. The Seventh Doctor faces a threat from an alternative world in Battlefield, where magic is real and the alternative version of The Doctor is hinted to be that reality's Merlin.

The U.S. flag in the Fallout franchise

The Fallout franchise is set in a 1950s retro-futuristic world that suffers a global nuclear war which destroys much of the globe.

Fatherland is a TV movie set in a 1960 alternative world where US President Joseph Kennedy and Adolf Hitler have agreed to meet to discuss an end to their country's Cold War 15 years after the Axis victory in World War II. However, an American reporter has discovered proof of the long denied Final Solution threatens the meeting.

The anime Fena: Pirate Princess featured an alternate 18th century.

For All Mankind, and its spinoff series Star City, depicts an alternate timeline in which the Soviet crewed lunar program successfully lands on the Moon before the US Apollo program, resulting in a continued and intensified Space Race.

Fringe has the father of one of the main characters cross into another reality to steal that world's version of his son after his son dies. The second world has a slightly different history, with a few different states in the United States, such as only one Carolina and Upper Michigan as a state. In addition, the 9/11 attack didn't take down the Twin Towers but the White House. Also, several major DC Comics events are different, such as Superman not Supergirl dying during Crisis on Infinite Earths. The incursion to steal the son has many negative effects on that world, and while the realities start out as antagonist, they eventually work together to repair the damage.

The Man in the High Castle, an adaptation of the novel of the same name, showed a world where the Axis Powers won World War II via FDR being assassinated 17 days before his inauguration.

Motherland: Fort Salem explores a female-dominated world in which witchcraft is real. Its world diverged from our timeline when the Salem witch trials are resolved by an agreement between witches and ungifted humans.

Noughts + Crosses is a British TV show set on a world where a powerful West African empire colonizes Europe 700 years before the start of the series.

Parallels was a planned TV show whose pilot was later released as a Netflix movie. The plot concerns a building which can shift realities every 36 hours and those who use the building to travel to other realities.

The Plot Against America is an HBO miniseries where Charles Lindbergh wins the 1940 US presidential election as an anti-war candidate who moves the country toward fascism.

Primal features Spear and Fang from the Prehistoric encountering with Ancient Egypt and Vikings era, and in episode The Primal Theory where Charles Darwin is alive in 1890 instead of 1882.

The TV show Sliders explores different possible alternate realities by having the protagonist "slide" into different parallel dimensions of the same planet Earth.

The Great Martian War 1913-1917 is an alternate history mockumentary where giant martians with machines invaded the Earth during WW1, causing huge technological upgrades and the entente and central powers fighting alongside each other.

SS-GB shows a world where the Axis powers quickly win World War II, killing Churchill and installing a puppet government. However, British resistance fights back.

In the various Star Trek TV shows and spin off media a Mirror Universe has been encountered where Earth has an empire that subjugates other planets. Doppelgängers of the main cast of many the TV shows appear in that reality. In Star Trek's primary universe, there are references to alternative versions of historical events, and entirely alternative ones, such as the rise of Khan Noonien Singh in the fictional Eugenics Wars, from 1992 to 1996. Some of these alternative events have been explained as being effects of time travel.

The Watchmen series is set on a world where costumed heroes were initially welcomed but later outlawed. It is set 34 years after the events of the comic book on which the series shares a name.

The Marvel Cinematic Universe series, Loki (2021 and 2023), on Disney+, shows an agency which prevents alterations to the timeline. Alternate versions of Loki from various universes appear.

The Marvel Cinematic Universe series, What If...? (2021–2024), on Disney+, shows alternate universes that depict alternate events from the MCU films.

== Online ==
Fans of alternate history have made use of the internet from a very early point to showcase their own works and provide useful tools for those fans searching for anything alternate history, first in mailing lists and usenet groups, later in web databases and forums. The "Usenet Alternate History List" was first posted on 11 April 1991, to the Usenet newsgroup rec.arts.sf-lovers. In May 1995, the dedicated newsgroup soc.history.what-if was created for showcasing and discussing alternate histories. Its prominence declined with the general migration from unmoderated usenet to moderated web forums, most prominently AlternateHistory.com, the self-described "largest gathering of alternate history fans on the internet" with over 10,000 active members.

In addition to these discussion forums, in 1997 Uchronia: The Alternate History List was created as an online repository, now containing over 2,900 alternate history novels, stories, essays, and other printed materials in several different languages. Uchronia was selected as the Sci Fi Channel's "Sci Fi Site of the Week" twice.

== Uchronia ==
In Spanish, French, German, Portuguese, Italian, Catalan, and Galician, the words uchronie, ucronia, and ucronía are native versions of alternate history, from which comes the English loanword uchronia. The English term uchronia is a neologism that is sometimes used in its original meaning as a straightforward synonym for alternate history. However, it may also now refer to other concepts, namely an umbrella genre of fiction that encompasses alternate history, parallel universes in fiction, and fiction based in futuristic or non-temporal settings.

== See also ==
- 20th century in science fiction
- Alien space bats
- Alternative future
- American Civil War alternate histories
- Dieselpunk
- Dystopian
- Fictional universe
- Future history
- The Garden of Forking Paths
- Historical revisionism
- Hypothetical Axis victory in World War II
- Invasion literature
- Jonbar hinge
- List of alternate history fiction
- Possible worlds
- Pulp novels
- Ruritanian romance
