= Joseph Chamberlin =

Joseph Chamberlin may refer to:

- Joseph Conrad Chamberlin, American arachnologist
- Joseph Edgar Chamberlin, American journalist and editor
- Willard Joseph Chamberlin, known as Joe, American entomologist

== See also ==
- Joseph Chamberlain (disambiguation)
