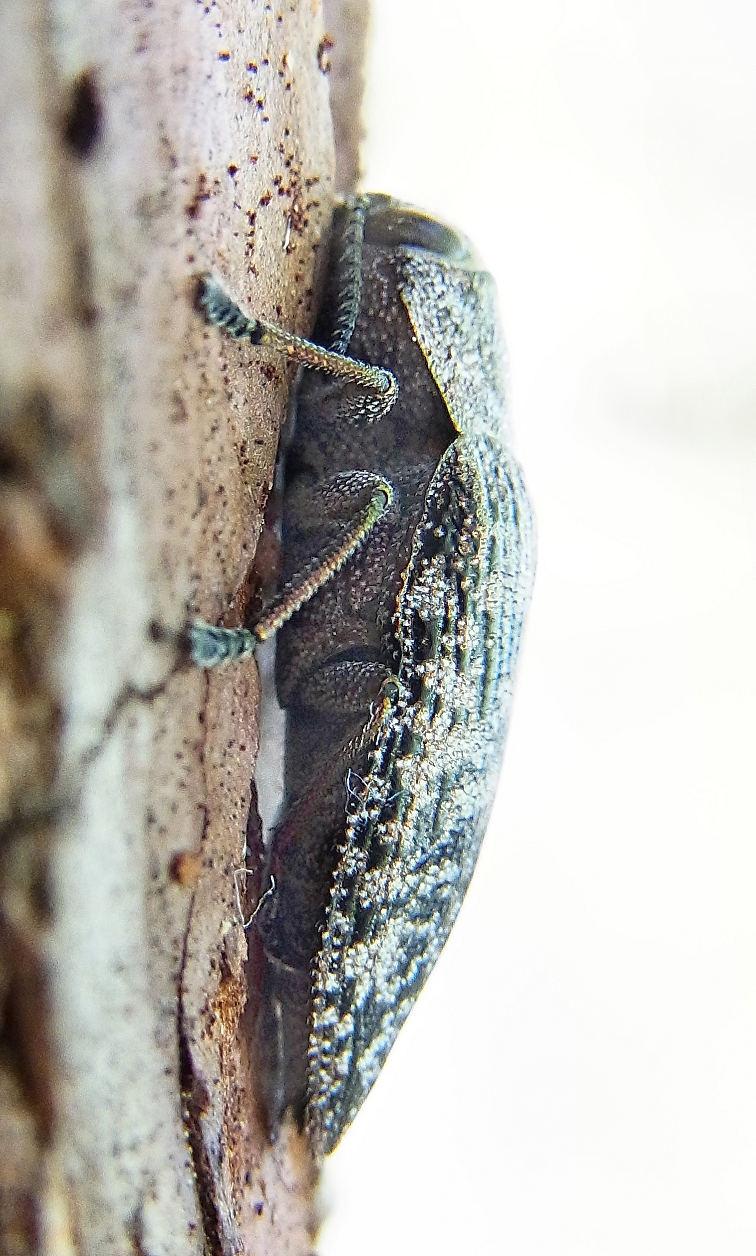
- Poecilonota variolosa

Scientific classification
- Kingdom: Animalia
- Phylum: Arthropoda
- Class: Insecta
- Order: Coleoptera
- Suborder: Polyphaga
- Infraorder: Elateriformia
- Family: Buprestidae
- Subfamily: Chrysochroinae
- Genus: Poecilonota; Eschscholtz, 1829

= Poecilonota =

Genus of beetles

Poecilonota is a genus of beetles in the family Buprestidae, containing the following species:

- Poecilonota bridwelli Van Dyke, 1918
- Poecilonota californica Chamberlin, 1922
- Poecilonota cyanipes (Say, 1823)
- Poecilonota ferrea (Melsheimer, 1845)
- Poecilonota fraseri Chamberlin, 1922
- Poecilonota montana Chamberlin, 1922
- Poecilonota plebeja (Fabricius, 1777)
- Poecilonota salixi Chamberlin, 1925
- Poecilonota semenovi Obenberger, 1934
- Poecilonota thureura (Say, 1832)
- Poecilonota variolosa (Paykull, 1799)
- Poecilonota viridicyanea Nelson, 1997
