= Poecilonota thureura =

Scientific classification
- Domain: Eukaryota
- Kingdom: Animalia
- Phylum: Arthropoda
- Class: Insecta
- Order: Coleoptera
- Suborder: Polyphaga
- Infraorder: Elateriformia
- Family: Buprestidae
- Genus: Poecilonota
- Species: P. thureura

Binomial name
- Poecilonota thureura (Say, 1832)

Synonyms
- Poecilonota costicollis (Gory, 1841)

Species of beetle

Poecilonota thureura is a species of metallic wood-boring beetle in the family Buprestidae. It is found in North America.
