= Poecilonota californica =

Scientific classification
- Domain: Eukaryota
- Kingdom: Animalia
- Phylum: Arthropoda
- Class: Insecta
- Order: Coleoptera
- Suborder: Polyphaga
- Infraorder: Elateriformia
- Family: Buprestidae
- Genus: Poecilonota
- Species: P. californica

Binomial name
- Poecilonota californica Chamberlin, 1922

Species of beetle

Poecilonota californica, the western poplar buprestid, is a species of metallic wood-boring beetle in the family Buprestidae. It is found in North America.
