= Joseph Chamberlain (disambiguation) =

Joseph Chamberlain (1836–1914) was a British politician and statesman, first a radical Liberal then a leading imperialist.

Joseph Chamberlain may also refer to:

- Sir Joseph Austen Chamberlain (1863–1937), British statesman
- Joseph Conrad Chamberlin (1898–1962), American arachnologist
- Willard Joseph Chamberlin (1890–1971), American entomologist and WWI pilot, known as Joe
- Joe Chamberlain (Australian politician) (1900–1984)
- Joe Chamberlain (baseball) (1910–1983), Major League Baseball player
- Joseph Chamberlain (planetarium director) (1923–2011), former director of the Adler Planetarium
- Joseph W. Chamberlain (1928–2004), atmospheric scientist and 1961 winner of the Helen B. Warner Prize for Astronomy
- Joseph Chamberlain (DC Comics), fictional character from DC Comics

== See also ==
- Chamberlain (surname)
- Joseph Chamberlain Sixth Form College, Highgate, Birmingham, England
