= Poecilonota ferrea =

Scientific classification
- Domain: Eukaryota
- Kingdom: Animalia
- Phylum: Arthropoda
- Class: Insecta
- Order: Coleoptera
- Suborder: Polyphaga
- Infraorder: Elateriformia
- Family: Buprestidae
- Genus: Poecilonota
- Species: P. ferrea

Binomial name
- Poecilonota ferrea (Melsheimer, 1845)

Species of beetle

Poecilonota ferrea is a species of metallic wood-boring beetle in the family Buprestidae. It is found in North America.
