= Brave New World =

1932 dystopian novel by Aldous Huxley

- First edition
- Author: Aldous Huxley
- Cover artist: Leslie Holland
- Genre: Science fiction, dystopian fiction
- Publisher: Chatto & Windus
- Publication date: February 1932
- Publication place: United Kingdom
- Pages: 311 (1932 ed.); 63,766 words
- Awards: Le Monde's 100 Books of the Century
- OCLC: 20156268
- Text: Brave New World online

Brave New World is a dystopian novel by English author Aldous Huxley, written in 1931, and published in 1932. Largely set in a futuristic World State, whose citizens are environmentally engineered into an intelligence-based social hierarchy, the novel anticipates huge scientific advancements in reproductive technology, sleep-learning, psychological manipulation, and classical conditioning that are combined to make a seemingly utopian society which is challenged by an outsider character, John the Savage. Huxley followed this book with a reassessment in essay form, Brave New World Revisited (1958), and with his final novel, Island (1962), the utopian counterpart. This novel is often used as a companion piece or inversion counterpart to George Orwell's Nineteen Eighty-Four (1949).

In 1998 and 1999, the Modern Library ranked Brave New World at number 5 on its list of the 100 Best Novels in English of the 20th century. In 2003, Robert McCrum, writing for The Observer, included Brave New World chronologically at number 53 in "the top 100 greatest novels of all time", and the novel was listed at number 87 on The Big Read survey by the BBC. Brave New World has frequently been banned and challenged since its original publication. It has landed on the American Library Association list of top 100 banned and challenged books of the decade since the association began the list in 1990.

== Title ==
The title Brave New World derives from William Shakespeare's The Tempest, Act V, Scene I, Miranda's speech:

O wonder!
How many goodly creatures are there here!
How beauteous mankind is! O brave new world,
That has such people in 't.

— William Shakespeare, The Tempest, Act V, Scene I, ll. 203–206

Shakespeare's use of the phrase is intended ironically, as the speaker is failing to recognise the evil nature of the island's visitors because of her innocence. Indeed, the next speaker—Miranda's father Prospero—replies to her innocent observation with the statement "'Tis new to thee".

Translations of the title often allude to similar expressions used in domestic works of literature: the French edition of the work is entitled Le Meilleur des mondes (The Best of All Worlds), an allusion to an expression used by the philosopher Gottfried Leibniz and satirised in Candide, Ou l'Optimisme by Voltaire (1759). The first Standard Chinese translation, done by novelist Lily Hsueh and Aaron Jen-wang Hsueh in 1974, is entitled "美麗新世界" (Pinyin: Měilì Xīn Shìjiè, literally "Beautiful New World"), quoting the Chinese translation of The Tempest.

== History ==
Huxley wrote Brave New World while living in Sanary-sur-Mer, France, in the four months from May to August 1931. By this time, Huxley had established himself as a writer and social satirist. He was a contributor to Vanity Fair and Vogue magazines and had published a collection of his poetry (The Burning Wheel, 1916) and four satirical novels, Crome Yellow (1921), Antic Hay (1923), Those Barren Leaves (1925) and Point Counter Point (1928). Brave New World was Huxley's fifth novel and first dystopian work.

A short passage in Crome Yellow foreshadows Brave New World, showing that Huxley had such a future in mind already in 1921. Mr Scogan, one of the earlier book's characters, describes an "impersonal generation" of the future that will "take the place of Nature's hideous system. In vast state incubators, rows upon rows of gravid bottles will supply the world with the population it requires. The family system will disappear; society, sapped at its very base, will have to find new foundations; and Eros, beautifully and irresponsibly free, will flit like a gay butterfly from flower to flower through a sunlit world".

Huxley said that Brave New World was inspired by the utopian novels of H. G. Wells, including A Modern Utopia (1905), and as a parody of Men Like Gods (1923). Wells' hopeful vision of the future gave Huxley the idea to begin writing a parody of the novels, which became Brave New World. He wrote in a letter to Mrs. Arthur Goldsmith, an American acquaintance, that he had "been having a little fun pulling the leg of H. G. Wells" but then he "got caught up in the excitement of [his] own ideas". Unlike the most popular optimistic utopian novels of the time, Huxley sought to provide a frightening vision of the future. Huxley referred to Brave New World as a "negative utopia", somewhat influenced by Wells's own The Sleeper Awakes (dealing with subjects like corporate tyranny and behavioural conditioning) and the works of D. H. Lawrence.

For his part, Wells published, two years after Brave New World, his utopian Shape of Things to Come. Seeking to rebut the argument of Huxley's Mustapha Mond—that moronic underclasses were a necessary "social gyroscope" and that a society composed solely of intelligent, assertive "Alphas" would inevitably disintegrate in internecine struggle—Wells depicted a stable egalitarian society emerging after several generations of a reforming elite having complete control of education throughout the world. In the future depicted in Wells's book, posterity remembers Huxley as "a reactionary writer". The scientific futurism in Brave New World is believed to be appropriated from Daedalus by J. B. S. Haldane.

The events of the Great Depression in Great Britain in 1931, with its mass unemployment and the abandonment of the gold standard, persuaded Huxley to assert that stability was the "primal and ultimate need" if civilisation was to survive the present crisis. The Brave New World character Mustapha Mond, Resident World Controller of Western Europe, is named after Sir Alfred Mond. Shortly before writing the novel, Huxley visited the Billingham Manufacturing Plant, Mond's technologically advanced factory near Billingham, north-east England, and it made a great impression on him.

Huxley used the setting and characters in his science fiction novel to express widely felt anxieties, particularly the fear of losing individual identity in the fast-paced world of the future. An early trip to the United States gave Brave New World much of its character. Huxley was outraged by the culture of youth, commercial cheeriness, sexual promiscuity and the inward-looking nature of many Americans; he had also found the book My Life and Work by Henry Ford on the boat to North America and he saw the book's principles applied in everything he encountered after leaving San Francisco.

== Plot ==
The novel opens in the World State city of London in AF (After Ford) 632 (AD 2540 in the Gregorian calendar), where citizens are engineered through artificial wombs and childhood indoctrination programmes into predetermined castes based on intelligence and labour. Embryos in different bottles are treated with chemicals to suit them for their planned roles; those for the higher classes get chemicals to optimise them, and those of the lower classes are made increasingly imperfect. The classes are Alpha (planned leaders), Beta, Gamma, Delta, and Epsilon (menial labourers of limited intelligence). Each caste is indoctrinated, largely by sleep-conditioning, to prefer their own class—epsilons are happy that they do not have the intellectual burden of alphas—and wears a uniform colour of clothing for easy identification: Alphas wear grey, Betas mulberry, Gammas green, Deltas khaki and Epsilons black. Sleep-teaching (hypnopaedia) trains children to accept their caste. In chapter 2, a recording tells Beta children that Alphas work harder because they are "frightfully clever". The child is glad to be a Beta because he does not "work so hard". The same recording calls Gammas and Deltas worse than Betas, and says that Epsilons cannot read or write.

Lenina Crowne, a hatchery worker, is popular and sexually desirable, but Bernard Marx, a psychologist, is not. He is shorter in stature than the average member of his high alpha caste, which gives him an inferiority complex. His work with sleep-learning allows him to understand, and disapprove of, his society's methods of keeping its citizens peaceful, which includes their constant consumption of a soothing, happiness-producing drug called "soma". Courting disaster, Bernard is vocal and arrogant about his criticisms, and his boss contemplates exiling him to Iceland because of his nonconformity. His only friend is Helmholtz Watson, a gifted writer who finds it difficult to use his talents creatively in their pain-free society. Bernard takes a holiday with Lenina outside the World State to a "Savage Reservation" in New Mexico, in which the two observe natural-born people, disease, the ageing process, other languages, and religious lifestyles for the first time. The culture of the village folk resembles the contemporary Native American groups of the region, descendants of the Anasazi, including the Puebloan peoples of Hopi and Zuni. Bernard and Lenina witness a violent public ritual and then encounter Linda, a woman originally from the World State who is living on the reservation with her son John, now a young man. She, too, visited the reservation on a holiday many years ago, but became separated from her group and was left behind. She had meanwhile become pregnant by a fellow holidaymaker (who is revealed to be Bernard's boss, the Director of Hatcheries and Conditioning). She did not try to return to the World State, because of her shame at her pregnancy. Despite spending his whole life in the reservation, John has never been accepted by the villagers, and his and Linda's lives have been hard and unpleasant. Linda has taught John to read, although from the only book in her possession—a scientific manual—and another book left behind by a local resident named Popé: the complete works of Shakespeare. Ostracised by the villagers, John is able to articulate his feelings only in terms of Shakespearean drama, quoting often from The Tempest, King Lear, Othello, Romeo and Juliet and Hamlet. Linda now wants to return to London, and John, too, wants to see this "brave new world" that his mother so often praised. Bernard sees an opportunity to thwart plans to exile him, and gets permission to take Linda and John back. On their return to London, John meets the Director and calls him his "father", a vulgarity which causes a roar of laughter. The humiliated Director resigns in shame before he can follow through with exiling Bernard.

Bernard, as "custodian" of the "savage" John who is now treated as a celebrity, is fawned on by the highest members of society and revels in attention he once scorned. Bernard's popularity is fleeting, though, and he becomes envious that John only really bonds with the literary-minded Helmholtz. Considered hideous and friendless, Linda spends all her time using soma, which she craved for so long, while John refuses to attend social events organised by Bernard, appalled by what he perceives to be an empty society. Lenina and John are physically attracted to each other, but John's view of courtship and romance, based on Shakespeare's writings, is utterly incompatible with Lenina's freewheeling attitude to sex. She tries to seduce him, but he attacks her, before suddenly being informed that his mother is on her deathbed. He rushes to Linda's bedside, causing a scandal, as this is not the "correct" attitude to death. Some children who enter the ward for "death-conditioning" come across as disrespectful to John, and he attacks one physically. He then tries to break up a distribution of soma to a lower-caste group, telling them that he is freeing them. Helmholtz and Bernard rush in to stop the ensuing riot, which the police quell by spraying soma vapour into the crowd.

Bernard, Helmholtz, and John are all brought before Mustapha Mond, the "Resident World Controller for Western Europe", who tells Bernard and Helmholtz that they are to be exiled to islands for antisocial activity. Bernard pleads for a second chance, but Helmholtz welcomes the opportunity to be a true individual, and chooses the Falkland Islands as his destination, believing that their bad weather will inspire his writing. Mond tells Helmholtz that exile is actually a reward. The islands are full of the most interesting people in the world, individuals who did not fit into the social model of the World State. Mond outlines for John the events that led to the present society and his arguments for a caste system and social control. John rejects Mond's arguments, and Mond sums up John's views by claiming that John demands "the right to be unhappy". John asks if he may go to the islands as well, but Mond refuses, saying he wishes to see what happens to John next.

Jaded with his new life, John moves to an abandoned hilltop lighthouse, near the village of Puttenham, where he intends to adopt a solitary ascetic lifestyle in order to purify himself of civilisation, practising self-flagellation. This draws reporters and eventually hundreds of amazed sightseers, hoping to witness his bizarre behaviour.

For a while, it seems that John might be left alone, after the public's attention is drawn to other diversions, but a documentary-maker has secretly filmed John's self-flagellation from a distance, and when released, the documentary causes an international sensation. Helicopters arrive with more journalists. Crowds of people descend on John's retreat, demanding that he perform his whipping ritual for them. From one helicopter a young woman emerges who is implied to be Lenina. John, at the sight of a woman he both adores and loathes, whips at her in a fury and then turns the whip on himself, exciting the crowd, whose wild behaviour transforms into a soma-fuelled orgy. The next morning, John awakes on the ground and is consumed by remorse over his participation in the orgy.

That evening, a swarm of helicopters appear on the horizon, with the story of last night's orgy having been in all the newspapers. The first onlookers and reporters to arrive find that John is dead, having hanged himself.

== Characters ==
Bernard Marx, a sleep-learning specialist at the Central London Hatchery and Conditioning Centre. Although Bernard is an Alpha-Plus (the upper class of the society), he is a misfit. He is unusually short for an Alpha; an alleged accident with alcohol in Bernard's blood-surrogate before his decanting has left him slightly stunted. Unlike his fellow utopians, Bernard is often angry, resentful, and jealous. At times, he is also cowardly and hypocritical. His conditioning is clearly incomplete. He does not enjoy communal sports, solidarity services, or promiscuous sex. He does not particularly enjoy soma. Bernard is in love with Lenina and does not like her sleeping with other men, even though "everyone belongs to everyone else". Bernard's triumphant return to utopian civilisation with John the Savage from the Reservation precipitates the downfall of the Director, who had been planning to exile him. Bernard's triumph is short-lived; he is ultimately banished to an island for his non-conformist behaviour.

John, the illicit son of the Director and Linda, born and reared on the Savage Reservation ("Malpais") after Linda was unwittingly left behind by her errant lover. John ("the Savage" or "Mr Savage", as he is often called) is an outsider both on the Reservation—where the natives still practise marriage, natural birth, family life and religion—and the ostensibly civilised World State, based on principles of stability and happiness. He has read nothing but the complete works of William Shakespeare, which he quotes extensively, and, for the most part, aptly, though his allusion to the "Brave New World" (Miranda's words in The Tempest) takes on a darker and bitterly ironic resonance as the novel unfolds. John is intensely moral according to a code that he has been taught by Shakespeare and life in Malpais but is also naïve: his views are as imported into his own consciousness as are the hypnopedic messages of World State citizens. The admonishments of the men of Malpais taught him to regard his mother as a whore; but he cannot grasp that these were the same men who continually sought her out despite their supposedly sacred pledges of monogamy. Because he is unwanted in Malpais, he accepts the invitation to travel back to London and is initially astonished by the comforts of the World State. He remains committed to values that exist only in his poetry. He first spurns Lenina for failing to live up to his Shakespearean ideal and then the entire utopian society: he asserts that its technological wonders and consumerism are poor substitutes for individual freedom, human dignity and personal integrity. After his mother's death, he becomes deeply distressed with grief, surprising onlookers in the hospital. He then withdraws himself from society and attempts to purify himself of "sin" (desire), but is unable to do so. His unusual behaviour eventually attracts the attention of reporters and, later, huge amounts of people, who arrive in helicopters and make John furious with their behaviour. Excited by his fury, people start an orgy, which he cannot resist joining. After waking up the next morning, John is horrified by his actions and hangs himself.

Helmholtz Watson, a handsome and successful Alpha-Plus lecturer at the College of Emotional Engineering and a friend of Bernard. He feels unfulfilled writing endless propaganda doggerel, and the stifling conformism and philistinism of the World State make him restive. Helmholtz is ultimately exiled to the Falkland Islands—a cold asylum for disaffected Alpha-Plus non-conformists—after reading a heretical poem to his students on the virtues of solitude and helping John destroy some Deltas' rations of soma following Linda's death. Unlike Bernard, he takes his exile in his stride and comes to view it as an opportunity for inspiration in his writing. His first name derives from the German physicist Hermann von Helmholtz.

Lenina Crowne, a young, beautiful foetus technician at the Central London Hatchery and Conditioning Centre. Lenina Crowne is a Beta who enjoys being a Beta. She is a vaccination worker with beliefs and values that are in line with a citizen of the World State. She is part of the 30% of the female population that are not freemartins (sterile women). Lenina is promiscuous and popular but somewhat quirky in her society: she had a four-month relation with Henry Foster, choosing not to have sex with anyone but him for a period of time. She is basically happy and well-conditioned, using soma to suppress unwelcome emotions, as is expected. Lenina has a date with Bernard, to whom she feels ambivalently attracted, and she goes to the Reservation with him. On returning to civilisation, she tries and fails to seduce John the Savage. John loves and desires Lenina but he is repelled by her forwardness and the prospect of pre-marital sex, rejecting her as an "impudent strumpet". Lenina visits John at the lighthouse but he attacks her with a whip, unwittingly inciting onlookers to do the same. Her exact fate is left unspecified.

Mustapha Mond, Resident World Controller of Western Europe, "His Fordship" Mustapha Mond presides over one of the ten zones of the World State, the global government set up after the cataclysmic Nine Years' War and great Economic Collapse. Sophisticated and good-natured, Mond is an urbane and hyperintelligent advocate of the World State and its ethos of "Community, Identity, Stability". Among the novel's characters, he is uniquely aware of the precise nature of the society he oversees and what it has given up to accomplish its gains. Mond argues that art, literature, and scientific freedom must be sacrificed to secure the ultimate utilitarian goal of maximising societal happiness. He defends the caste system, behavioural conditioning, and the lack of personal freedom in the World State: these, he says, are a price worth paying for achieving social stability, the highest social virtue because it leads to lasting happiness.

Fanny Crowne, Lenina Crowne's friend (they have the same last name because only ten thousand last names are in use in a World State comprising two billion people). Fanny voices the conventional values of her caste and society, particularly the importance of promiscuity: she advises Lenina that she should have more than one man in her life because it is unseemly to concentrate on just one. Fanny then warns Lenina away from a new lover whom she considers undeserving, yet she is ultimately supportive of the young woman's attraction to the savage John.

Henry Foster, one of Lenina's many lovers, is a perfectly conventional Alpha male, casually discussing Lenina's body with his coworkers. His success with Lenina, and his casual attitude about it, infuriate the jealous Bernard. Henry ultimately proves himself every bit the ideal World State citizen, finding no courage to defend Lenina from John's assaults despite having maintained an uncommonly longstanding sexual relationship with her.

Benito Hoover, another of Lenina's lovers. She remembers that he is particularly hairy when he takes his clothes off.

The Director of Hatcheries and Conditioning (DHC), also known as Thomas "Tomakin", is the administrator of the Central London Hatchery and Conditioning Centre, where he is a threatening figure who intends to exile Bernard to Iceland. His plans take an unexpected turn when Bernard returns from the Reservation with Linda (see below) and John, a child they both realise is actually his. This fact, scandalous and obscene in the World State, not because it was extramarital (which all sexual acts are), but because it was procreative, leads the Director to resign his post in shame.

Linda, John's mother, decanted as a Beta-Minus in the World State, originally worked in the DHC's Fertilizing Room, and subsequently lost during a storm while visiting the New Mexico Savage Reservation with the Director many years before the events of the novel. Despite following her usual precautions, Linda became pregnant with the Director's son during their time together and was therefore unable to return to the World State by the time that she found her way to Malpais. Having been conditioned to the promiscuous social norms of the World State, Linda finds herself at once popular with every man in the pueblo (because she is open to all sexual advances) and also reviled for the same reason, seen as a whore by the wives of the men who visit her and by the men themselves (who come to her nonetheless). Her only comforts there are mescal brought by Popé as well as peyotl. Linda is desperate to return to the World State and to soma, wanting nothing more from her remaining life than comfort until death.

The Arch-Community-Songster, the secular equivalent of the Archbishop of Canterbury in the World State society. He takes personal offense when John refuses to attend Bernard's party.

The Director of Crematoria and Phosphorus Reclamation, one of the many disappointed, important figures to attend Bernard's party.

The Warden, an Alpha-Minus, the talkative chief administrator for the New Mexico Savage Reservation. He is blond, short, broad-shouldered, and has a booming voice.

Darwin Bonaparte, a "big game photographer" (i.e., filmmaker) who films John flogging himself. Darwin Bonaparte became known for two works: "feely of the gorillas' wedding", and "Sperm Whale's Love-life". He had already made a name for himself but still seeks more. He renews his fame by filming the savage, John, in his newest release "The Savage of Surrey". His name alludes to Charles Darwin and Napoleon Bonaparte.

Dr. Shaw, Bernard Marx's physician who consequently becomes the physician of both Linda and John. He prescribes a lethal dose of soma to Linda, which will stop her respiratory system from functioning in a span of one to two months, at her own behest but not without protest from John. Ultimately, they all agree that it is for the best, since denying her this request would cause more trouble for Society and Linda herself.

Dr. Gaffney, Provost of Eton, an Upper School for high-caste individuals. He shows Bernard and John around the classrooms, and the Hypnopaedic Control Room (used for behavioural conditioning through sleep learning). John asks if the students read Shakespeare but the Provost says the library contains only reference books because solitary activities, such as reading, are discouraged.

Miss Keate, Head Mistress of Eton Upper School. Bernard fancies her, and arranges an assignation with her.

=== Others ===
- Freemartins, women who have been deliberately made sterile by exposure to male hormones during foetal development but are still physically normal except for "the slightest tendency to grow beards". In the book, government policy requires freemartins to form 70% of the female population.

=== Of Malpais ===
- Popé, a native of Malpais. Although he reinforces the behaviour that causes hatred for Linda in Malpais by sleeping with her and bringing her mescal, he still holds the traditional beliefs of his tribe. In his early years John attempted to kill him, but Popé brushed off his attempt and sent him fleeing. He gave Linda a copy of the Complete Works of Shakespeare. (Historically, Popé or Po'pay was a Tewa religious leader who led the Pueblo Revolt in 1680 against Spanish colonial rule.)
- Mitsima, an elder tribal shaman who also teaches John survival skills such as rudimentary ceramics (specifically coil pots, which were traditional to Native American tribes) and bow-making.
- Kiakimé, a native girl whom John fell in love with, but is instead eventually wed to another boy from Malpais.
- Kothlu, a native boy with whom Kiakimé is wed.

=== Background figures ===
These are non-fictional and factual characters who lived before the events in this book, but are of note in the novel:

- Henry Ford, who has become a messianic figure to the World State. "Our Ford" is used in place of "Our Lord", as a credit to popularising the use of the assembly line.
- Sigmund Freud, "Our Freud" is sometimes said in place of "Our Ford" because Freud's psychoanalytic method depends implicitly upon the rules of classical conditioning, and because Freud popularised the idea that sexual activity is essential to human happiness. (It is also strongly implied that citizens of the World State believe Freud and Ford to be the same person.)
- H. G. Wells, "Dr. Wells", British writer and utopian socialist, whose book Men Like Gods was a motivation for Brave New World. "All's well that ends Wells", wrote Huxley in his letters, criticising Wells for anthropological assumptions Huxley found unrealistic.
- Ivan Pavlov, whose conditioning techniques are used to train infants.
- William Shakespeare, whose banned works are quoted throughout the novel by John, "the Savage". The plays quoted include Macbeth, The Tempest, Romeo and Juliet, Hamlet, King Lear, Troilus and Cressida, Measure for Measure and Othello. Mustapha Mond also knows them because as a World Controller he has access to a selection of books from throughout history, including the Bible.
- Thomas Robert Malthus, 19th century British economist, believed the people of the Earth would eventually be threatened by their inability to raise enough food to feed the population. In the novel, the eponymous character devises the contraceptive techniques (Malthusian belt) that are practiced by women of the World State.
- John Henry Newman, 19th century Catholic theologian and educator, believed university education the critical element in advancing post-industrial Western civilization. Mustapha Mond and The Savage discuss a passage from one of Newman's books.
- Alfred Mond, British industrialist, financier and politician. He is the namesake of Mustapha Mond.
- Mustafa Kemal Atatürk, the founder and first President of Republic of Turkey. Naming Mond after Atatürk links up with their characteristics; he reigned during the time Brave New World was written and revolutionised the 'old' Ottoman state into a new nation.

=== Sources of names and references ===
The limited number of names that the World State assigned to its bottle-grown citizens can be traced to political and cultural figures who contributed to the bureaucratic, economic, and technological systems of Huxley's age, and presumably those systems in Brave New World.

- Soma: Huxley took the name for the drug used by the state to control the population after the Vedic ritual drink Soma, inspired by his interest in Indian mysticism.
- Malthusian belt: A contraceptive device worn by women. When Huxley was writing Brave New World, organizations such as the Malthusian League had spread throughout Europe, advocating contraception. Although the controversial economic theory of Malthusianism was derived from an essay by Thomas Malthus about the economic effects of population growth, Malthus himself was an advocate of abstinence rather than contraception.
- Bokanovsky's Process: A scientific process used in the World State to mass-produce human beings. Specifically, the "Bokanovsky Process" is a method of producing multiple embryos from a single fertilized egg, creating up to 96 identical individuals. This technique is central to the society's efforts to maintain social stability and control, as it allows for the creation of a standardized, docile workforce. It's part of the larger theme in the novel of dehumanization and the reduction of individuality in the pursuit of a controlled, stable society. It is thought that the process's name is a reference to Maurice Bokanowski, a French Bureaucrat who believed strongly in the idea of governmental and social efficiency. Complementing this, Podsnap's Technique accelerates the maturation of human eggs, enabling the rapid production of thousands of nearly identical individuals. Together, these methods facilitate the creation of a large, standardized population, eliminating natural reproduction and traditional family structures, thereby reinforcing the World State's control over its citizens.

== Reception ==
Upon its publication, Rebecca West praised Brave New World as "The most accomplished novel Huxley has yet written", Joseph Needham lauded it as "Mr Huxley's remarkable book", and Bertrand Russell also praised it, stating, "Mr Aldous Huxley has shown his usual masterly skill in Brave New World." Brave New World also received negative responses from other contemporary critics, although his work was later embraced.

In an article in the 4 May 1935 issue of the Illustrated London News, G. K. Chesterton explained that Huxley was revolting against the "Age of Utopias". Much of the discourse on man's future before 1914 was based on the thesis that humanity would solve all economic and social issues. In the decade following the war the discourse shifted to an examination of the causes of the catastrophe. The works of H. G. Wells and George Bernard Shaw on the promises of socialism and a World State were then viewed as the ideas of naive optimists. Chesterton wrote:

After the Age of Utopias came what we may call the American Age, lasting as long as the Boom. Men like Ford or Mond seemed to many to have solved the social riddle and made capitalism the common good. But it was not native to us; it went with a buoyant, not to say blatant optimism, which is not our negligent or negative optimism. Much more than Victorian righteousness, or even Victorian self-righteousness, that optimism has driven people into pessimism. For the Slump brought even more disillusionment than the War. A new bitterness, and a new bewilderment, ran through all social life, and was reflected in all literature and art. It was contemptuous, not only of the old Capitalism, but of the old Socialism. Brave New World is more of a revolution against Utopia than against Victoria.

Similarly, in 1944 economist Ludwig von Mises described Brave New World as a satire of utopian predictions of socialism: "Aldous Huxley was even courageous enough to make socialism's dreamed paradise the target of his sardonic irony."

=== Common misunderstandings ===
Various authors assume that the book was first and foremost a cautionary tale regarding human genetic enhancement, indeed about—as a report of Bush associate Leon Kass states—"producing improved [...] perfect or post-human" people. In fact, the title itself has become a mere stand-in used to "evoke the general idea of a futuristic dystopia". Geneticist Derek So suggests that this is a misunderstanding, however. According to him, a 'more careful reading of the text' shows that:

there does not seem to be any genetic testing in Brave New World, and most of the methods described involve hormones and chemicals rather than heritable interventions. Although Huxley wrote that "eugenics and dysgenics were practiced systematically", this seems to refer only to selective breeding and not to any kind of direct manipulation on the genetic level. (The Bokanovsky process does represent a form of cloning, but this is not ethically equivalent to germline genome editing, and references to Brave New World may lead some readers to confuse the two technologies.) [...] While it's true that the upper castes in Brave New World are smarter than the others, this is more because of the deliberate impairment of the lower castes than because the upper castes are "perfect". Rather than reducing the number of individuals born with genetic disorders or handicaps, Huxley's dystopia involves dramatically increasing their number. [...] Quite the opposite: Huxley thought that Brave New World might come about if we didn't start selecting better children.

Overall, Derek So notes that "Huxley was much more worried about totalitarianism than about the new biotechnologies per se that he alluded to in Brave New World." Despite claims to the contrary then, Huxley remained a committed eugenicist all throughout his life, much like his comparably famous brother Julian, and one just as keen on stressing its humanistic underpinnings.

== The World State and Fordism ==
The World State is built upon the principles of Henry Ford's assembly line: mass production, homogeneity, predictability, and consumption of disposable consumer goods. While the World State lacks any supernatural-based religions, Ford himself is revered as the creator of their society but not as a deity, and characters celebrate Ford Day and swear oaths by his name (e.g., "By Ford!"). In this sense, some fragments of traditional religion are present, such as Christian crosses, which had their tops cut off to be changed to a "T", representing the Ford Model T. In England, there is an Arch-Community-Songster of Canterbury, obviously continuing the Archbishop of Canterbury, and in America The Christian Science Monitor continues publication as The Fordian Science Monitor. The World State calendar numbers years in the "AF" era—"After Ford"—with the calendar beginning in AD 1908, the year in which Ford's first Model T rolled off his assembly line. The novel's Gregorian calendar year is AD 2540, but it is referred to in the book as AF 632.

From birth, members of every class are indoctrinated by recorded voices repeating slogans while they sleep (called "hypnopædia" in the book) to believe that membership of their own class is preferable, but that the other classes perform needed functions. Any residual unhappiness is resolved by an antidepressant and hallucinogenic drug called soma. Hypnopedia is described in the book as having developed in this form when a child (Reuben Rabinovitch) memorised foreign-language speeches while sleeping and subsequent experiments showed that social attitudes were more readily instilled than factual information via sleep-learning.

The biological techniques used to control the populace in Brave New World do not include genetic engineering; Huxley wrote the book before the structure of DNA was known. However, Gregor Mendel's work with inheritance patterns in peas had been rediscovered in 1900 and the eugenics movement, based on artificial selection, was well established. Huxley's family included a number of prominent biologists including Thomas Huxley, half-brother and Nobel Laureate Andrew Huxley, and his brother Julian Huxley who was a biologist and involved in the eugenics movement. Nonetheless, Huxley emphasises conditioning over breeding (nurture versus nature); human embryos and fetuses are conditioned through a carefully designed regimen of chemical (such as exposure to hormones and toxins), thermal (exposure to intense heat or cold, as one's future career would dictate), and other environmental stimuli, although there is an element of selective breeding as well.

== Comparisons with George Orwell's Nineteen Eighty-Four ==
In a letter to George Orwell about Nineteen Eighty-Four, Huxley wrote "Whether in actual fact the policy of the boot-on-the-face can go on indefinitely seems doubtful. My own belief is that the ruling oligarchy will find less arduous and wasteful ways of governing and of satisfying its lust for power, and these ways will resemble those which I described in Brave New World." He went on to write "Within the next generation I believe that the world's rulers will discover that infant conditioning and narco-hypnosis are more efficient, as instruments of government, than clubs and prisons, and that the lust for power can be just as completely satisfied by suggesting people into loving their servitude as by flogging and kicking them into obedience."

Social critic Neil Postman contrasted the worlds of Nineteen Eighty-Four and Brave New World in the foreword of his 1985 book Amusing Ourselves to Death. He writes:

What Orwell feared were those who would ban books. What Huxley feared was that there would be no reason to ban a book, for there would be no one who wanted to read one. Orwell feared those who would deprive us of information. Huxley feared those who would give us so much that we would be reduced to passivity and egoism. Orwell feared that the truth would be concealed from us. Huxley feared the truth would be drowned in a sea of irrelevance. Orwell feared we would become a captive culture. Huxley feared we would become a trivial culture, preoccupied with some equivalent of the feelies, the orgy porgy, and the centrifugal bumblepuppy. As Huxley remarked in Brave New World Revisited, the civil libertarians and rationalists who are ever on the alert to oppose tyranny "failed to take into account man's almost infinite appetite for distractions." In 1984, Huxley added, people are controlled by inflicting pain. In Brave New World, they are controlled by inflicting pleasure. In short, Orwell feared that what we hate will ruin us. Huxley feared that what we love will ruin us.

The writer Christopher Hitchens, who published several articles on Huxley and a book on Orwell, noted the difference between the two texts in the introduction to his 1999 article "Why Americans Are Not Taught History",

We dwell in a present-tense culture that somehow, significantly, decided to employ the telling expression "You're history" as a choice reprobation or insult, and thus elected to speak forgotten volumes about itself. By that standard, the forbidding dystopia of George Orwell's Nineteen Eighty-Four already belongs, both as a text and as a date, with Ur and Mycenae, while the hedonist nihilism of Huxley still beckons toward a painless, amusement-sodden, and stress-free consensus. Orwell's was a house of horrors. He seemed to strain credulity because he posited a regime that would go to any lengths to own and possess history, to rewrite and construct it, and to inculcate it by means of coercion. Whereas Huxley ... rightly foresaw that any such regime could break because it could not bend. In 1988, four years after 1984, the Soviet Union scrapped its official history curriculum and announced that a newly authorized version was somewhere in the works. This was the precise moment when the regime conceded its own extinction. For true blissed-out and vacant servitude, though, you need an otherwise sophisticated society where no serious history is taught.

== Brave New World Revisited ==
In 1946, Huxley wrote in the foreword of the new edition of Brave New World:

If I were now to rewrite the book, I would offer the Savage a third alternative. Between the Utopian and primitive horns of his dilemma would lie the possibility of sanity... In this community economics would be decentralist and Henry-Georgian, politics Kropotkinesque and co-operative. Science and technology would be used as though, like the Sabbath, they had been made for man, not (as at present and still more so in the Brave New World) as though man were to be adapted and enslaved to them. Religion would be the conscious and intelligent pursuit of man's Final End, the unitive knowledge of immanent Tao or Logos, the transcendent Godhead or Brahman. And the prevailing philosophy of life would be a kind of Higher Utilitarianism, in which the Greatest Happiness principle would be secondary to the Final End principle—the first question to be asked and answered in every contingency of life being: "How will this thought or action contribute to, or interfere with, the achievement, by me and the greatest possible number of other individuals, of man's Final End?"

First UK edition

Brave New World Revisited (Harper & Brothers, US, 1958; Chatto & Windus, UK, 1959), written by Huxley almost thirty years after Brave New World, is a non-fiction work in which Huxley considered whether the world had moved toward or away from his vision of the future from the 1930s. He believed when he wrote the original novel that it was a reasonable guess as to where the world might go in the future. In Brave New World Revisited, he concluded that the world was becoming like Brave New World much faster than he originally thought.

Huxley analysed the causes of this, such as overpopulation, as well as all the means by which populations can be controlled. He was particularly interested in the effects of drugs and subliminal suggestion. Brave New World Revisited is different in tone because of Huxley's evolving thought, as well as his conversion to Hindu Vedanta in the interim between the two books.

The last chapter of the book aims to propose action which could be taken to prevent a democracy from turning into the totalitarian world described in Brave New World. In Huxley's last novel, Island, he again expounds similar ideas to describe a utopian nation, which is generally viewed as a counterpart to Brave New World.

== Censorship ==
According to American Library Association, Brave New World has frequently been challenged in the United States due to insensitivity, offensive language, nudity, racism, drug use, conflict with a religious viewpoint, and being sexually explicit. It landed on the list of the top ten most challenged books in 2010 (3) and 2011 (7). The book also secured a spot on the association's list of the top one hundred challenged books for 1990–1999 (54), 2000–2009 (36), and 2010–2019 (26).

The following include specific instances of when the book has been censored, banned, or challenged:

- In 1932, the book was banned in Ireland for its language, and for supposedly being anti-family and anti-religion.
- In 1965, a Maryland English teacher alleged that he was fired for assigning Brave New World to students. The teacher sued for violation of First Amendment rights but lost both his case and the appeal, with the appeals court ruling that the assignment of the book was not the reason for his firing.
- The book was banned in India in 1967, with Huxley accused of being a "pornographer".
- In 1980, it was removed from classrooms in Miller, Missouri, among other challenges.
- The version of Brave New World Revisited published in China lacks explicit mentions of China itself.

== Influences and allegations of plagiarism ==
The English writer Rose Macaulay published What Not: A Prophetic Comedy in 1918. What Not depicts a dystopian future where people are ranked by intelligence, the government mandates mind training for all citizens, and procreation is regulated by the state. Macaulay and Huxley shared the same literary circles and he attended her weekly literary salons.

Bertrand Russell felt Brave New World borrowed from his 1931 book The Scientific Outlook, and wrote in a letter to his publisher that Huxley's novel was "merely an expansion of the two penultimate chapters of 'The Scientific Outlook.'"

H. G. Wells' novel The First Men in the Moon (1901) used concepts that Huxley added to his story. Both novels introduce a society (in Wells' case, that of the Lunar natives) consisting of a specialized caste system, in which new generations are produced in vessels, where their designated caste is decided before birth by tampering with the fetus' development, and individuals are drugged down when they are not needed.

George Orwell believed that Brave New World must have been partly derived from the 1921 novel We by Russian author Yevgeny Zamyatin. However, in a 1962 letter to Christopher Collins, Huxley says that he wrote Brave New World long before he had heard of We. According to We translator Natasha Randall, Orwell believed that Huxley was lying. Kurt Vonnegut said that in writing Player Piano (1952), he "cheerfully ripped off the plot of Brave New World, whose plot had been cheerfully ripped off from Yevgeny Zamyatin's We".

In 1982, Polish author Antoni Smuszkiewicz, in his analysis of Polish science-fiction Zaczarowana gra ("The Magic Game"), presented accusations of plagiarism against Huxley. Smuszkiewicz showed similarities between Brave New World and two science fiction novels written earlier by Polish author Mieczysław Smolarski, namely Miasto światłości ("The City of Light", 1924) and Podróż poślubna pana Hamiltona ("Mr Hamilton's Honeymoon Trip", 1928). Smuszkiewicz wrote in his open letter to Huxley: "This work of a great author, both in the general depiction of the world as well as countless details, is so similar to two of my novels that in my opinion there is no possibility of accidental analogy."

Kate Lohnes, writing for Encyclopædia Britannica, notes similarities between Brave New World and other novels of the era could be seen as expressing "common fears surrounding the rapid advancement of technology and of the shared feelings of many tech-skeptics during the early 20th century". Other dystopian novels followed Huxley's work, including C.S. Lewis's That Hideous Strength (1945) and Orwell's Nineteen Eighty-Four (1949).

== Legacy ==
In 1998–1999, the Modern Library ranked Brave New World fifth on its list of the 100 Best Novels in English of the 20th century. In 2003, Robert McCrum writing for The Observer included Brave New World chronologically at number 53 in "the top 100 greatest novels of all time", and the novel was listed at number 87 on the BBC's survey The Big Read.

On 5 November 2019, BBC News listed Brave New World on its list of the 100 Most Inspiring Novels. In 2021, Brave New World was one of six classic science fiction novels by British authors selected by Royal Mail to feature on a series of UK postage stamps.

== Adaptations ==
=== Theatre ===
- Brave New World (opened 4 September 2015) in co-production by Royal & Derngate, Northampton and Touring Consortium Theatre Company which toured the UK. The adaptation was by Dawn King, composed by These New Puritans and directed by James Dacre.

=== Radio ===
- Brave New World (radio broadcast) CBS Radio Workshop (27 January and 3 February 1956): music composed and conducted by Bernard Herrmann. Adapted for radio by William Froug. Introduced by William Conrad and narrated by Aldous Huxley. Featuring the voices of Joseph Kearns, Bill Idelson, Gloria Henry, Charlotte Lawrence, Byron Kane, Sam Edwards, Jack Kruschen, Vic Perrin, Lurene Tuttle, Herb Butterfield, Doris Singleton.
- Brave New World (radio broadcast) BBC Radio 4 (May 2013)
- Brave New World (radio broadcast) BBC Radio 4 (22, 29 May 2016)

=== Film ===
- Brave New World (1980), a television film directed by Burt Brinckerhoff
- Brave New World (1998), a television film directed by Leslie Libman and Larry Williams
- The 1993 film Demolition Man, starring Sylvester Stallone and Sandra Bullock, is said to draw heavily from the novel.

=== Television ===
- Brave New World (2010), miniseries directed by Leonard Menchiari
- Brave New World (2020), series created by David Wiener
  In May 2015, The Hollywood Reporter reported that Steven Spielberg's Amblin Television would bring Brave New World to Syfy network as a scripted series, adapted by Les Bohem. The adaptation was eventually written by David Wiener with Grant Morrison and Brian Taylor, with the series ordered to air on USA Network in February 2019. The series eventually moved to the Peacock streaming service and premiered on 15 July 2020. In October 2020, the series was cancelled after one season.

=== Comic ===
- Fred Fordham adapted the complete novel into a graphic novel, published in April 2022 by Harper.

== See also ==
- Alpha (ethology)
- Anti-nationalism
- Anti-theism
- Anthem
- Brain–computer interface
- Demolition Man
- The Glass Fortress (2016 film)
