= Poecilonota cyanipes =

Scientific classification
- Domain: Eukaryota
- Kingdom: Animalia
- Phylum: Arthropoda
- Class: Insecta
- Order: Coleoptera
- Suborder: Polyphaga
- Infraorder: Elateriformia
- Family: Buprestidae
- Genus: Poecilonota
- Species: P. cyanipes

Binomial name
- Poecilonota cyanipes (Say, 1823)

Synonyms
- Poecilonota apicilla Obenberger, 1928; Poecilonota collaris Obenberger, 1928; Poecilonota cupripes Casey, 1909; Poecilonota cyanipennis Hamilton, 1895; Poecilonota debilis LeConte, 1860; Poecilonota erecta (Gory, 1841); Poecilonota parviceps Casey, 1909

Species of beetle

Poecilonota cyanipes, the eastern poplar buprestid, is a species of metallic wood-boring beetle in the family Buprestidae. It is found in North America.
