= Poecilonota bridwelli =

Scientific classification
- Domain: Eukaryota
- Kingdom: Animalia
- Phylum: Arthropoda
- Class: Insecta
- Order: Coleoptera
- Suborder: Polyphaga
- Infraorder: Elateriformia
- Family: Buprestidae
- Genus: Poecilonota
- Species: P. bridwelli

Binomial name
- Poecilonota bridwelli Van Dyke, 1918

Species of beetle

Poecilonota bridwelli is a species of metallic wood-boring beetle in the family Buprestidae. It is found in Central America and North America.
