= A Modern Utopia =

1905 novel by English writer H. G. Wells

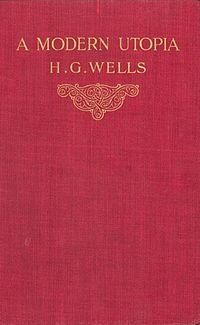
- Cover of the first edition
- Author: H. G. Wells
- Language: English
- Genre: Novel
- Publisher: Chapman and Hall
- Publication date: April 1905 (serialized in the Fortnightly Review, October 1904 – April 1905)
- Publication place: England
- Media type: Print
- Pages: 393

A Modern Utopia is a 1905 novel by H. G. Wells.

Because of the complexity and sophistication of its narrative structure, A Modern Utopia has been called "not so much a modern as a postmodern utopia." The novel is best known for its notion that a voluntary order of nobility known as the Samurai could effectively rule a "kinetic and not static" world state so as to solve "the problem of combining progress with political stability".

== Conception of the work ==
In his preface Wells forecasts (incorrectly) that A Modern Utopia would be the last of a series of volumes on social problems that he began in 1901 with Anticipations and that included Mankind in the Making (1903). Unlike those non-fictional works, A Modern Utopia is presented as a tale told by a sketchily described character known only as the Owner of the Voice, who, Wells warns the reader, "is not to be taken as the Voice of the ostensible author who fathers these pages." He is accompanied by another character known as "the botanist." Interspersed into the narrative are discursive remarks on various matters, creating what Wells calls in his preface "a sort of shot-silk texture between philosophical discussion on the one hand and imaginative narrative on the other." In addition, there are frequent comparisons to and discussions of previous utopian works.

In his Experiment in Autobiography (1934) Wells wrote that A Modern Utopia "was the first approach I made to the dialogue form," and that "the trend towards dialogue, like the basal notion of the Samurai, marks my debt to Plato. A Modern Utopia, quite as much as that of More, derives frankly from the Republic."

The premise of the novel is that there is a planet (for "No less than a planet will serve the purpose of a modern Utopia") exactly like Earth, with the same geography and biology. Moreover, on that planet "all the men and women that you know and I" exist "in duplicate." They have, however, "different habits, different traditions, different knowledge, different ideas, different clothing, and different appliances." (Not however, a different language: "Indeed, should we be in Utopia at all, if we could not talk to everyone?").

== Plot ==
To this planet "out beyond Sirius" the Owner of the Voice and the botanist are translated, imaginatively, "in the twinkling of an eye . . . We should scarcely note the change. Not a cloud would have gone from the sky." Their point of entry is on the slopes of the Piz Lucendro in the Swiss Alps.

The adventures of these two characters are traced through eleven chapters. Little by little they discover how Utopia is organized. It is a world with "no positive compulsions at all . . . for the adult Utopian—unless they fall upon him as penalties incurred."

The Owner of the Voice and the botanist are soon required to account for their presence. When their thumbprints are checked against records in "the central index housed in a vast series of buildings at or near Paris," both discover they have doubles in Utopia. They journey to London to meet them, and the Owner of the Voice's double is a member of the Samurai, a voluntary order of nobility that rules Utopia. "These samurai form the real body of the State."

Running through the novel as a foil to the main narrative is the botanist's obsession with an unhappy love affair back on Earth. The Owner of the Voice is annoyed at this undignified and unworthy insertion of earthly affairs in Utopia, but when the botanist meets the double of his beloved in Utopia the violence of his reaction bursts the imaginative bubble that has sustained the narrative and the two men find themselves back in early twentieth-century London.

== Utopian economics ==
The world shares the same language, coinage, customs, and laws, and freedom of movement is general. Some personal property is allowed, but "all natural sources of force, and indeed all strictly natural products" are "inalienably vested in the local authorities" occupying "areas as large sometimes as half England." The World State is "the sole landowner of the earth." Units of currency are based on units of energy, so that "employment would constantly shift into the areas where energy was cheap." Humanity has been almost entirely liberated from the need for physical labor: "There appears to be no limit to the invasion of life by the machine."

== The samurai and Utopian society ==
The narrator's double describes the ascetic Rule by which the samurai live: it includes a ban on alcohol and drugs, and a mandatory annual one-week solitary ramble in the wilderness. He also explains the social theory of Utopia, which distinguished four "main classes of mind": The Poietic, the Kinetic, the Dull, and the Base. Poietic minds are creative or inventive; kinetic minds are able but not particularly inventive; the Dull have "inadequate imagination," and the Base are mired in egotism and lack "moral sense."

== The relations of the sexes ==
There is extensive discussion of gender roles in A Modern Utopia, but no recognition of the existence of homosexuality. A chapter entitled "Women in a Modern Utopia" makes it clear that women are to be as free as men. Motherhood is subsidized by the state. Only those who can support themselves can marry, women at 21 and men at 26 or 27. Marriages that remain childless "expire" after a term of three to five years, but the partners may marry again if they choose.

== Race in Utopia ==
A Modern Utopia is also notable for Chapter 10 ("Race in Utopia"), an enlightened discussion of race. Contemporary racialist discourse is condemned as crude, ignorant, and extravagant. "For my own part I am disposed to discount all adverse judgments and all statements of insurmountable differences between race and race."

== Meat ==
The narrator is told, "In all the round world of Utopia there is no meat. There used to be. But now we cannot stand the thought of slaughter-houses. And, in a population that is all educated, and at about the same level of physical refinement, it is practically impossible to find anyone who will hew a dead ox or pig. We never settled the hygienic question of meat-eating at all. This other aspect decided us. I can still remember, as a boy, the rejoicings over the closing of the last slaughter-house." Members of the Utopian society still consume fish, however, and no rational explanation is offered for the discrepancy.

== Cats, dogs and horses ==
It is noted that the Utopian society embarked on "a systematic world-wide attempt to destroy for ever a great number of contagious and infectious diseases." This involved not only the elimination of rats and mice, but also – "for a time at any rate" – "a stringent suppression of the free movement of familiar animals," i.e.: "the race of cats and dogs – providing, as it does, living fastnesses to which such diseases as plague, influenza, catarrhs and the like, can retreat to sally forth again – must pass for a time out of freedom, and the filth made by horses and the other brutes of the highway vanish from the face of the earth." There are no cats or dogs to be seen anywhere in the Utopian cities. It is not specified what happened to the dogs, cats and horses living in the world when this change took place and whether some of them are still preserved in a location completely segregated from human society, to be reintroduced at some future date.

== Marriage ==
A central principle of the Utopian regime depicted by Wells is that not all people are allowed to get married. Marriage is a privilege granted only to people who pass certain criteria set by the regime. Wells does not refer to the obvious issue that people who are not allowed to get married may still engage in sex and have children. Such "unauthorized" children would evidently not benefit from the state-run child care and educational system described in detail in the novel. That, however, would tend to create an underclass of impoverished, uneducated vagrants - of which the book makes no reference.

== Exile islands ==
Misfits who do not fit into the Utopian society are regularly exiled to islands and there left to their own devices. They may perpetuate institutions and social behaviors considered long obsolete elsewhere. For example, they may erect Customs barriers and impose customs duties on goods imported to their islands, while the rest of the world has long since become a single economic zone.

This concept of "islands of exile" was later taken up by Aldus Huxley in Brave New World – but with a reversed value judgement. Where Wells presented a positive Utopian society exiling incorrigible reactionaries, Huxley had a Dystopian regime exiling creative people who rebel against its stifling rule.

== Origins ==
The work was partly inspired by a trip to the Alps Wells made with his friend Graham Wallas, a prominent member of the Fabian Society.

== Reception ==
Several Samurai societies were formed in response to A Modern Utopia, and Wells met members of one of them in April 1907 at the New Reform Club.

At a memorial service at the Royal Institution on 30 October 1946, two and a half months after Wells's death, William Beveridge read passages from the book and called it the work that had influenced him the most.

According to Vincent Brome, Wells's first comprehensive biographer after his death, it was widely read by university students and "released hundreds of young people into sexual adventure." W. Warren Wagar praised it, describing it and Wells's other utopian novels (Men Like Gods and The Shape of Things to Come) as "landmarks in that extraordinarily difficult genre." Indeed, The Shape of Things to Come takes up many themes of the earlier book, also depicting a self-appointed elite conducting massive social engineering and remaking of the world.

Joseph Conrad complained to Wells that he did not "take sufficient account of human imbecility, which is cunning and perfidious."

E. M. Forster satirised what he regarded as the book's unhealthy conformism in his science-fiction story "The Machine Stops", first published only four years later, in 1909.

Marie-Louise Berneri was also critical of the book, stating that "Wells commits the faults of his forerunners by introducing a vast amount of legislation into his utopia" and that "Wells's conception of freedom turns out to be a very narrow one." Wells's biographer Michael Sherborne criticizes the book for depicting "an undemocratic one-party state" in which truth is established not by critical discussion but by shared faith.

== Bibliography ==
- Deery, June. "H.G. Wells's A Modern Utopia as a Work in Progress." Extrapolation (Kent State University Press). 34.3 (1993): 216–229. EBSCO Host. Salem State College Library Databases. Salem, Massachusetts. 18 April 2008.
- "H.G. Wells." The Literature Network. 1 2000–2008. 18 April 2008.
- McLean, Steven. ""The Fertilising Conflict of Individualities": H. G. Wells's A Modern Utopia, John Stuart Mill's on Liberty, and the..." Papers on Language and Literature. 2 2007. 166. eLibrary. Proquest CSA. Salem State College Library Databases. Salem, Massachusetts. 18 April 2008.
- Review: [untitled], by A. W. S. The American Journal of Sociology, Vol. 11, No. 3 (November 1905), pp. 430–431. Published by: The University of Chicago Press. JSTOR. Salem State College Library Databases. Salem, Massachusetts. 18 April 2008.
- Review: [untitled], by C. M. H. The Journal of Political Economy, Vol. 14, No. 9 (November 1906), pp. 581–582. Published by: The University of Chicago Press. JSTOR. Salem State College Library Databases. Salem, Massachusetts. 18 April 2008.
- Wells, H.G. A Modern Utopia. New York, New York: Penguin Group, 2005.
