= Men Like Gods =

1923 novel by Herbert George Wells

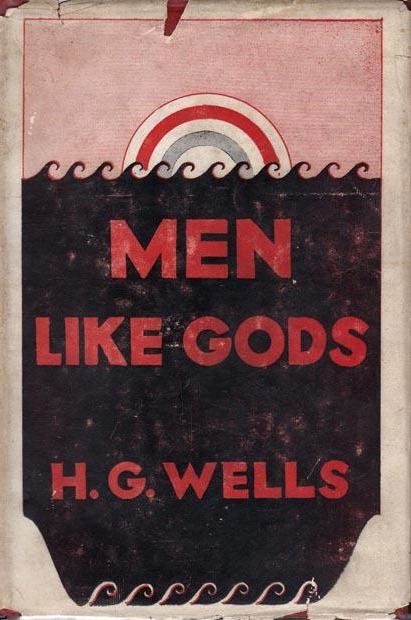
- First US edition
- Author: H. G. Wells
- Language: English
- Genre: Fiction
- Published: 1923
- Publisher: Cassell (UK); Macmillan (US)
- Publication place: United Kingdom
- Media type: Print (hardback)

Men Like Gods is a 1923 novel, referred to by the author as a "scientific fantasy", by English writer H. G. Wells. It features a utopia located in a parallel universe.

== Plot summary ==
Men Like Gods is set in the summer of 1921. Its protagonist is Mr. Barnstaple (his first name is either Alfred or William), a journalist working in London and living in Sydenham. He has grown dispirited at a newspaper called The Liberal and resolves to take a holiday. Taking leave of his wife and family, his plans are disrupted when his and two other automobiles are accidentally transported with their passengers into "another world," which the "Earthlings" call Utopia.

A sort of advanced Earth, Utopia is some three thousand years ahead of humanity in its development. For the 200,000,000 Utopians who inhabit this world, the "Days of Confusion" are a distant period studied in history books, but their past resembles humanity's in its essentials, differing only in incidental details: their Christ, for example, died on the wheel, not on the cross. Utopia lacks any world government and functions as a successfully realised anarchy. "Our education is our government," a Utopian named Lion says. Sectarian religion, like politics, has died away, and advanced scientific research flourishes. Life in Utopia is governed by "the Five Principles of Liberty", which are privacy, free movement, unlimited knowledge, truthfulness, and free discussion (allowing criticism).

Men Like Gods is divided into three books. Details of life in Utopia are given in Books I and III. In Book II, the Earthlings are quarantined on a rocky crag after infections they have brought cause a brief epidemic in Utopia. There they begin to plot the conquest of Utopia, despite Mr. Barnstaple's protests. He betrays them when his fellows try to take two Utopians hostage, forcing Mr. Barnstaple to escape execution for treason by fleeing perilously.

In Book III, Mr. Barnstaple longs to stay, but when he asks how he can best serve Utopia, he is told that he can do this "by returning to your own world". Regretfully he accepts and ends his month-long stay in Utopia. But he brings with him back to Earth a renewed determination to contribute to the effort to make a terrestrial Utopia: "[H]e belonged now soul and body to the Revolution, to the Great Revolution that is afoot on Earth; that marches and will never desist nor rest again until old Earth is one city and Utopia set up therein. He knew clearly that this Revolution is life, and that all other living is a trafficking of life with death."

== Critical response ==
Contemporary reviews of the novel were largely positive, though some found the story weakly plotted. As is often the case in his later fiction, Wells's utopian enthusiasm exceeded his interest in scientific romance or fantasy (his own terms for what is now called science fiction). The novel was yet another vehicle for Wells to propagate ideas of a possible better future society, also attempted in several other works, notably in A Modern Utopia (1905). Men Like Gods and other novels like it provoked Aldous Huxley to write Brave New World (1932), a parody and critique of Wellsian utopian ideas.

Wells himself later commented on the novel: "It did not horrify or frighten, was not much of a success, and by that time, I had tired of talking in playful parables to a world engaged in destroying itself."

== Themes ==
Several characters in the novel are directly taken from the politics of the 1920s. Rupert Catskill probably represents Winston Churchill, as he was seen at that time: a reckless adventurer. Catskill is depicted as a reactionary ideologue, criticises Utopia for its apparent decadence, and leads the attempted conquest of Utopia. Wells had once been a political ally of Churchill, who admired his novels and was a social reformer earlier in his career, and had endorsed Churchill in the 1908 Manchester North West by-election. By 1923 he had become disillusioned with Churchill over his role in the Dardanelles Campaign and the Allied intervention in the Russian Civil War.

Men Like Gods is notable for a number of set pieces: a description of telepathy, which has become the standard means of communication among Utopians and which enables them to communicate in the languages of the Earthlings (English and French); a meditation on mortality; a reflection on the continuing distinctions between the races in Utopia, there being little interbreeding as a matter of individual choice, although social intercourse is free; a description of how society could function without money; a denunciation of Marxism; a description of a wireless communication device; and several discussions of multiple universes.

== See also ==
- Communalism (political philosophy)
- Utopia

== Bibliography ==
- Rose, Jonathan (2014). The Literary Churchill. London: Yale University Press. ISBN 978-0-300-20407-0.
