= Michael McCollum =

American novelist

- Born: 1946 (age 79–80); Phoenix, Arizona, U.S.
- Education: Arizona State University
- Occupations: Author, aerospace engineer
- Writing career
- Pen name: Michael McCollum
- Period: 1979 to present
- Genre: Science fiction
- Website: www.scifi-az.com

Michael Allen McCollum (born 1946 in Phoenix, Arizona) is an American science fiction author and aerospace engineer. He graduated from Arizona State University, where he studied aerospace propulsion and nuclear engineering. He is employed by Honeywell in Tempe, Arizona. In 1997, he founded Sci Fi - Arizona, one of the first author-owned-and-operated virtual bookstores on the Internet. He also conducts writers workshops. Most of his novels have been published as audio books by Audible Inc. They have also been translated into German.

== Bibliography ==
=== Makers series ===
- Life Probe (1983, Del Rey, ISBN 0-345-30295-8)
- Procyon's Promise (1985, Del Rey, ISBN 0-345-30296-6)

=== Antares series ===
- Antares Dawn (1986, Del Rey, ISBN 0-345-32313-0)
- Antares Passage (1987, Del Rey, ISBN 0-345-32314-9)
- Antares Victory (2002, SciFi Arizona, ISBN 1-929381-09-3)

=== Gibraltar series ===
- Gibraltar Earth (1999, SciFi Arizona, ISBN 1-929381-25-5)
- Gibraltar Sun (2006, SciFi Arizona, ISBN 1-932657-55-X)
- Gibraltar Stars (2009, SciFi Arizona, ISBN 978-1-934805-29-9)

=== Standalone novels ===
- A Greater Infinity (1982, Del Rey, ISBN 0-345-30167-6)
- Thunderstrike (1989, Del Rey, ISBN 0-345-35352-8)
- The Clouds of Saturn (1991, Del Rey, ISBN 0-345-36412-0)
- The Sails of Tau Ceti (1992, Del Rey, ISBN 0-345-37108-9)
- Euclid's Wall (2012, SciFi Arizona, ISBN 978-1-934805-63-3)
- Lost Earth (2020, SciFi - Arizona) ISBN 9781947483194

=== Collections and short stories ===
- Gridlock and Other Stories (1998, SciFi Arizona, ISBN 1-929381-16-6)

=== Non-fiction ===
- The Art of Writing, Volume 1 (2000) ISBN 978-1-929381-29-6
- The Art of Writing, Volume 2 (2000) ISBN 978-1-932657-31-9
- The Art of Science Fiction, Volume 1 (2000) ISBN 978-1-929381-21-0
- The Art of Science Fiction, Volume 2 (2000) ISBN 978-1-932657-23-4
- The Astrogator's Handbook (2000) ISBN 1-929381-42-5
