= The Big Time (novel) =

1958 novel by Fritz Leiber

- 1961 Ace Double Edition Cover
- Author: Fritz Leiber
- Cover artist: Ed Emshwiller
- Language: English
- Series: Change War
- Genre: Science fiction
- Publisher: Ace Books (1961 book edition), Gregg Press (1976 first hardback edition)
- Publication date: 1958 (as a serial), 1961 (as a novel)
- Publication place: United States
- Media type: Print (hardback & paperback)
- Award: Hugo Award for Best Novel or Novelette (1958)

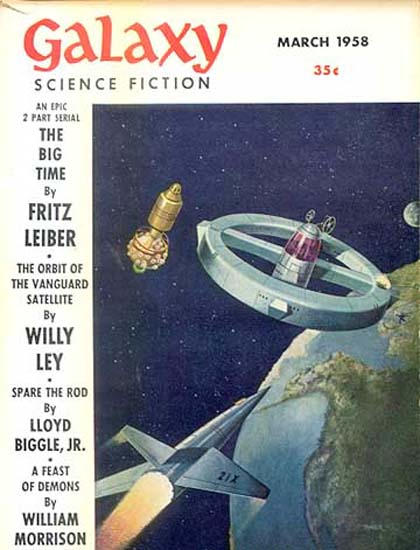
The Big Time was serialized in Galaxy Science Fiction in 1958

The Big Time is a short science fiction novel by American writer Fritz Leiber. Awarded the Hugo Award for Best Novel or Novelette in 1958, The Big Time was published originally in two parts in Galaxy Magazine's March and April 1958 issues, illustrated by Virgil Finlay. It was subsequently reprinted in book form several times. The Big Time is a story involving only a few characters, but with a vast, cosmic backstory.

== Plot summary ==
=== Premise ===
Two factions, the Spiders and the Snakes, are both capable of time travel. They are engaged in a long-term conflict called "The Change War". Their method of battle involves changing the outcomes of events throughout history (temporal war). The true forms or identities of the Spiders and the Snakes, how those nicknames were chosen, or whether they are in any way descriptive are all unknown.

New Spiders and Snakes are recruited from various places and times to become participants in the Change War. Characters include: Cretan Amazons, Roman legionnaires, Hussars, Wehrmacht Landsers, American GIs, and Space Commandos. Non-human participants include Lunans and Venusians, recruited from billions of years in the past and future. Soldiers from the armies of Alexander the Great, Genghis Khan, Napoleon, and Stalin may find themselves fighting side by side or on opposing sides. Likewise, medical staff and entertainers are inducted into the temporal war to provide medical treatment, rest, and relaxation for injured and weary combatants.

Within the context of the story, the Change War is fought primarily in a timeline known as the Little Time. The story takes place inside a Recuperation Station, which is located within an artificially-created bubble of spacetime outside of the Universe, run on the Big Time.

One of the effects of the Change War was causing an Axis victory in World War II. However devastating this development is to 20th century humanity, now doomed to live under the worldwide oppressive and genocidal rule of Nazi Germany, in the context of the overall Spider-Snake cosmic conflict, this change was incidental and of only marginal importance.

=== Plot ===
The narrator of the novel is Greta, a young human female from the early 20th century employed at a Recuperation Station known as the Place. Greta is an Entertainer: part prostitute, part nurse, part psychotherapist. Her companions include Sidney Lessingham, the boss of the Place; Lillian Foster, another Entertainer; Doc Beauvis, an alcoholic physician; and Maud, an older nurse. They are visited by a group of soldiers including British RAF soldier Bruce Marchant, Wehrmacht officer Erich von Emmelmann, Cretan Amazon Kaby, Roman soldier Mark, Venusian Sevensee, and Lunan Illy. The soldiers bring an atomic bomb into the Place, intending to use it in a future battle.

The characters discuss their participation in various aspects of the Change War, which seems to be shifting against the Spiders. Lillian and Bruce rekindle their romantic relationship, which began prior to their recruitment into the Spiders. Bruce attempts to convince his fellow soldiers to abandon the war and fight for peace. He is strongly opposed by Erich. During this discussion, the Maintainer disappears; this machine keeps the Place situated within the Big Time and separate from the main timeline. Lillian tries to convince everyone that they should remain in their pocket universe indefinitely.

Erich primes the atomic bomb and threatens to kill everyone if they are not returned to the main timeline. Greta finds that Lillian has hidden the Maintainer in the art gallery, disguised as a sculpture. The Maintainer is restored. Bruce disarms the bomb. Everyone agrees to keep silent about Bruce's proposed mutiny, since every character has something to hide from the incident.

Greta and Illy discuss the future of the Change War. Illy concludes that it represents the next phase in the evolution of the universe, much as animals represented a "step up" from plants.

== Reception ==
Algis Budrys praised The Big Time (which he categorized as a play, not a novel) as evidence that Leiber was the only science fiction writer of his generation "who as a matter of course and conviction saw through the mores and circumstances which are now proving nonviable not only in commercial literature but in what we can call life as well", and a precursor to Roger Zelazny and Samuel R. Delany. In February 1968 he named the book the "Best Thing All Year". In 2012, it was selected for inclusion in the Library of America's two-volume compilation American Science Fiction: Nine Classic Novels of the 1950s.

== Legacy ==
Leiber followed up The Big Time with seven short stories set in the same universe:

- "Try and Change the Past" (Astounding Science Fiction, 1958)
- "A Deskful of Girls" (The Magazine of Fantasy & Science Fiction, 1958)
- "Damnation Morning" (Fantastic, 1959)
- "No Great Magic" (Galaxy, 1960)
- "The Oldest Soldier" (The Magazine of Fantasy & Science Fiction, 1960)
- "When the Change-Winds Blow" (The Magazine of Fantasy & Science Fiction, 1964)
- "Knight to Move" (Broadside, 1965)

All seven stories were collected in Changewar (Ace, 1983).

Poul Anderson employed the same basic theme - a war between two powerful factions, who confront each other throughout time and use people plucked from various periods as their soldiers - in his novel The Corridors of Time (1965).
