= Joseph Edgar Chamberlin =

American journalist

Joseph Edgar "J. E." or "Ed" Chamberlin (August 6, 1851 – July 6, 1935) was an American journalist, columnist, essayist, and editor whose work appeared in newspapers in Chicago, Boston, and New York, as well as in national magazines and journals, beginning in 1871 and continuing until his death in 1935. Beginning in the late 1880s, he wrote a popular column for the Boston Evening Transcript called "The Listener" and thus became known throughout New England as "The Listener of the Transcript." He was a friend and mentor to many aspiring writers, photographers, musicians, and artists, and maintained a close friendship with Helen Keller and her teacher Anne Sullivan for over 40 years. He died in South Hanson, Massachusetts in 1935 and is buried in his birthplace of Newbury, Vermont.

== Early life ==
Chamberlin was born in Newbury, Vermont, the youngest child of Abner and Mary (Haseltine) Chamberlin. The Chamberlins were descendants of one of Newbury's founding families. Joseph Edgar's early years were spent in Spring Prairie, Wisconsin, where his father, a farmer, moved in 1857. The Chamberlins were staunch and vocal abolitionists, frequently housing itinerant abolitionist speakers and politicians at their home. Young "Ed" was educated in a one-room schoolhouse, and though he wanted to attend college, the family could not afford it, so he was forced to find a trade. He followed his older brother, Everett Chamberlin, already established in the newspaper business, to Chicago in 1868. While there, he provided himself with what he called a "classical" education by reading extensively at the nearby Chicago Public Library.

== Career ==
Chamberlin began his newspaper career as a seventeen-year-old proofreader for the Chicago Evening Post, where his brother Everett was employed. In October 1871, he was one of the first eyewitnesses on the scene of the Great Chicago Fire and his reports were some of the first to go out to the world. He then worked for a short time in Indianapolis for the Indianapolis Daily Journal before returning to Chicago and work for the Chicago Times in 1873. He rose to a managing role at the Times before resigning and moving east in 1880.

He worked briefly as an editor for the Daily Herald in Newport, Rhode Island and the Daily News in Fall River, Massachusetts before moving to Boston in 1884. There, he was the first editor of the Evening Record, and then an editor for the Daily Advertiser. He joined the Boston Evening Transcript in 1886 as an editorial and general writer.

In 1887, Chamberlin began writing a daily column for the Transcript called "The Listener," and subsequently became known throughout New England as "The Listener of the Transcript." He was also attached to The Youth's Companion as editor and writer.

He moved to New York in 1901 and worked for the New York Evening Mail and New York Evening Post. While at the Mail, he worked alongside C. L. Edson and Rube Goldberg.

Over the course of his career, he also authored several books. He wrote two companion books, The Listener in the Town and The Listener in the Country (Copeland and Day, 1896), John Brown (Beacon, 1899), an alternate history book titled The Ifs of History (1907), and Nomads and Listeners (Riverside, 1937). In 1921, he published a limited edition tribute to his son Raymond, killed in action during World War I in Marcheville, France, called The Only Thing for a Man to Do.

He also wrote for national magazines such as Vanity Fair, Harper's Weekly, and The Sunday Magazine. In 1930, he edited The Boston Evening Transcript: A history of its first hundred years.

== Family and friendships ==
In 1873, Chamberlin married Ida Elizabeth Atwood, the daughter of Charles Atwood, a colleague of his at the Chicago Times. Together they had five children and one adopted son. Several of their children died in infancy or childhood.

In 1888, through his Transcript writing and advocacy for the Perkins School for the Blind, Chamberlin began a friendship with Helen Keller and her teacher Anne Sullivan. Keller and Sullivan began visiting Chamberlin and his family at their home called Red Farm in Wrentham, Massachusetts when Helen was nine years old. She often spent weekends and holidays with the Chamberlins and lived with them for a year in 1896–97. Early in the friendship, she began calling Chamberlin "Uncle Ed," which she did until his death more than 40 years later.

Red Farm, the Chamberlins' home on the shores of what was then called King Phillip's Pond, was a gathering place for literary, political, and artistic figures of the day. Notables such as Edward Everett Hale, Louise Imogen Guiney, F. Luis Mora, F. Holland Day, Mary Wilkins Freeman, Bliss Carman, Bradford Torrey, Hamlin Garland, Charles W. Chesnutt, and Native American women artists Zitkala-Sa and Angel de Cora congregated at Red Farm and they, along with Keller and Sullivan, have left archival material that illuminates Chamberlin's career, home, and family life.

His career brought him into contact with many notables of the day. It was said that he interviewed every president of the U.S. from Ulysses S. Grant to Calvin Coolidge. William Dean Howells and Edward Everett Hale both sent congratulatory letters to be read at an event in Boston celebrating the publication of his Listener books in 1896.

== Later years and death ==
Chamberlin's career as a writer and editor spanned more than 60 years. His first wife Ida Atwood Chamberlin died in 1914. Chamberlin married Leonilda Farness (b. Farnese) in 1915. She died in 1923. He married Jenny LeRoyer Chamberlin in 1926. Chamberlin continued to write for the Transcript until his death in South Hanson, Massachusetts on July 6, 1935. He is buried in the Oxbow Cemetery in Newbury, Vermont. Upon his death, tributes were written in publications that included Editor and Publisher magazine and the New York Herald Tribune. The former described Chamberlin as "the dean of Boston editors," and added that the Herald-Tribune said "he was one of the most widely recognized staff writers of his times." He was survived by his daughters Helen Chamberlin Dodd, Elisabeth Chamberlin Darling, Eleanor Chamberlin Boshco, and adopted son Phillip Chamberlin.
