= Willard Joseph Chamberlin =

American entomologist

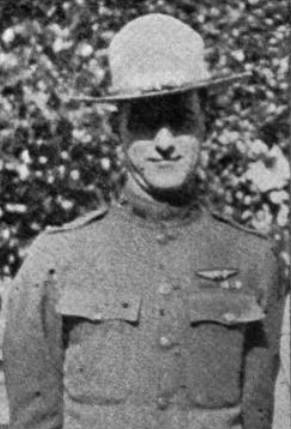
- Chamberlin, circa 1918
- Education: Oregon State College B.S. (1915), MS. (1921); Stanford University Ph.D. (1930)
- Scientific career
- Fields: Entomology
- Workplaces: Oregon State College
- Thesis: A study of the buprestidae of the north Pacific coast region (1930)
- Doctoral advisor: J. O. Snyder
- Military career
- Allegiance: United States of America
- Branch: Army Air Service/Army Air Forces
- Service years: 1918–1919; 1941–?
- Rank: Major
- Awards: Croix de Guerre

Willard Joseph Chamberlin (1890–1971) was an American entomologist and professor at Oregon State College who specialized in jewel beetles and bark beetles. He was also a pilot in World War I who received the French Cross of War (Croix de Guerre) and was recommended for the U.S. Distinguished Service Cross.

== Early life and military service ==
Chamberlin earned a Bachelor of Science at Oregon Agricultural College (now Oregon State University) in 1915, and graduated from the School of Military Aeronautics at University of California, Berkeley, on August 1, 1917. He passed Reserve Military Aviator's test on October 20, 1917, and was commissioned First Lieutenant in January 1918, with 141st Aero Squadron. During World War I he served in England, France, and Italy. He twice flew the English Channel delivering planes from Paris to London. He performed reconnaissance and photography work during the St. Miheil and Argonne offensives. In the second day of the St. Miheil drive with his observer, under great difficulties, carried out the longest reconnaissance over German territory of any American aviators. As a volunteer for a mission for flying at low altitude over enemy lines for certain information, he received the Cross of War from the French. He brought down three enemy planes and attempted to deliver messages to the famous Lost Battalion in the Meuse-Argonne Offensive, France. He was recommended three different times for the Distinguished Service Cross. He was discharged from active duty in February 1919 and became a professor at Oregon State.

Chamberlin was recalled up to the military in May 1941, with the rank of Major, and stationed in charge of a training film preparation unit at Lowry Field in Denver, Colorado. In February 1942, he reported for duty at Sheppard Field in Texas, where he directed technical training at the Army Air Forces Technical School.

== Entomology ==
Chamberlin specialized in jewel beetles (family Buprestidae) and bark beetles (subfamily Scotylinae). He earned his PhD from Stanford University in 1930 with a dissertation on jewel beetles of the north Pacific coast. His works include The Buprestidae of North America, exclusive of Mexico (1926) and The Bark and Timber Beetles of North America north of Mexico (1939), as well as the text book An Introduction to Forest Entomology and Entomological Nomenclature and Literature. In 1950, he sold his beetle collection to the California Academy of Sciences.

== Family ==
Chamberlin's daughter Hope Chamberlin (1918–1974) was a journalist and author whose book A Minority of Members won the 1974 Christopher Award for adult nonfiction.
