= Walter H. Taylor =

Confederate Army officer

Walter Herron Taylor
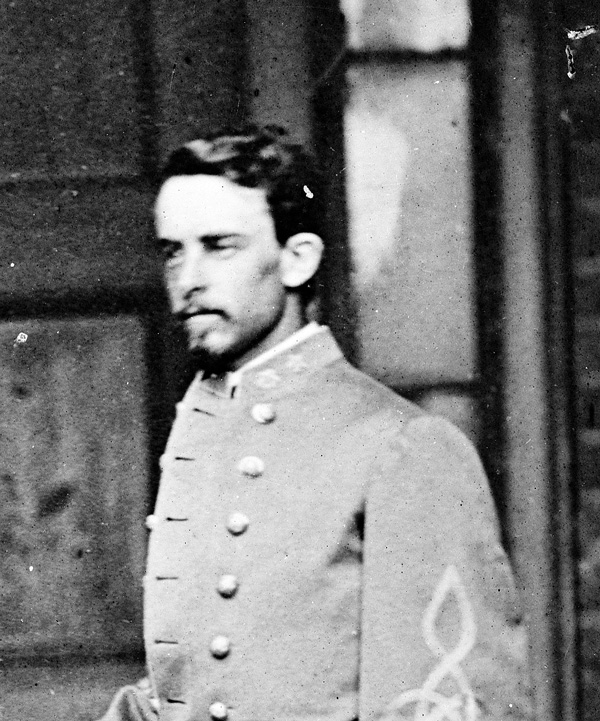
- Lt. Col. Walter H. Taylor, Lee's aide-de-camp

Member of the Virginia Senate from the Norfolk, Virginia district
- In office 1869–1873

Personal details
- Born: June 13, 1838 Norfolk, Virginia, US
- Died: March 1, 1916 (aged 77) Norfolk, Virginia, US
- Resting place: Elmwood Cemetery, Norfolk, Virginia
- Party: Conservative
- Education: Virginia Military Institute

Military service
- Allegiance: Confederate States
- Branch/service: Confederate States Army
- Years of service: 1861–1865
- Rank: Colonel
- Commands: Assistant Adjutant General, Army of Northern Virginia
- Battles/wars: American Civil War

Walter Herron Taylor (June 13, 1838 – March 1, 1916) was an American banker, lawyer, soldier, politician, author, and railroad executive from Norfolk, Virginia. During the American Civil War, he fought with the Confederate States Army, became a key aide to General Robert E. Lee and rose to the rank of Colonel. After the war, Taylor became a senator in the Virginia General Assembly, and attorney for the Norfolk and Western Railway and later the Virginian Railway.

== Early life ==
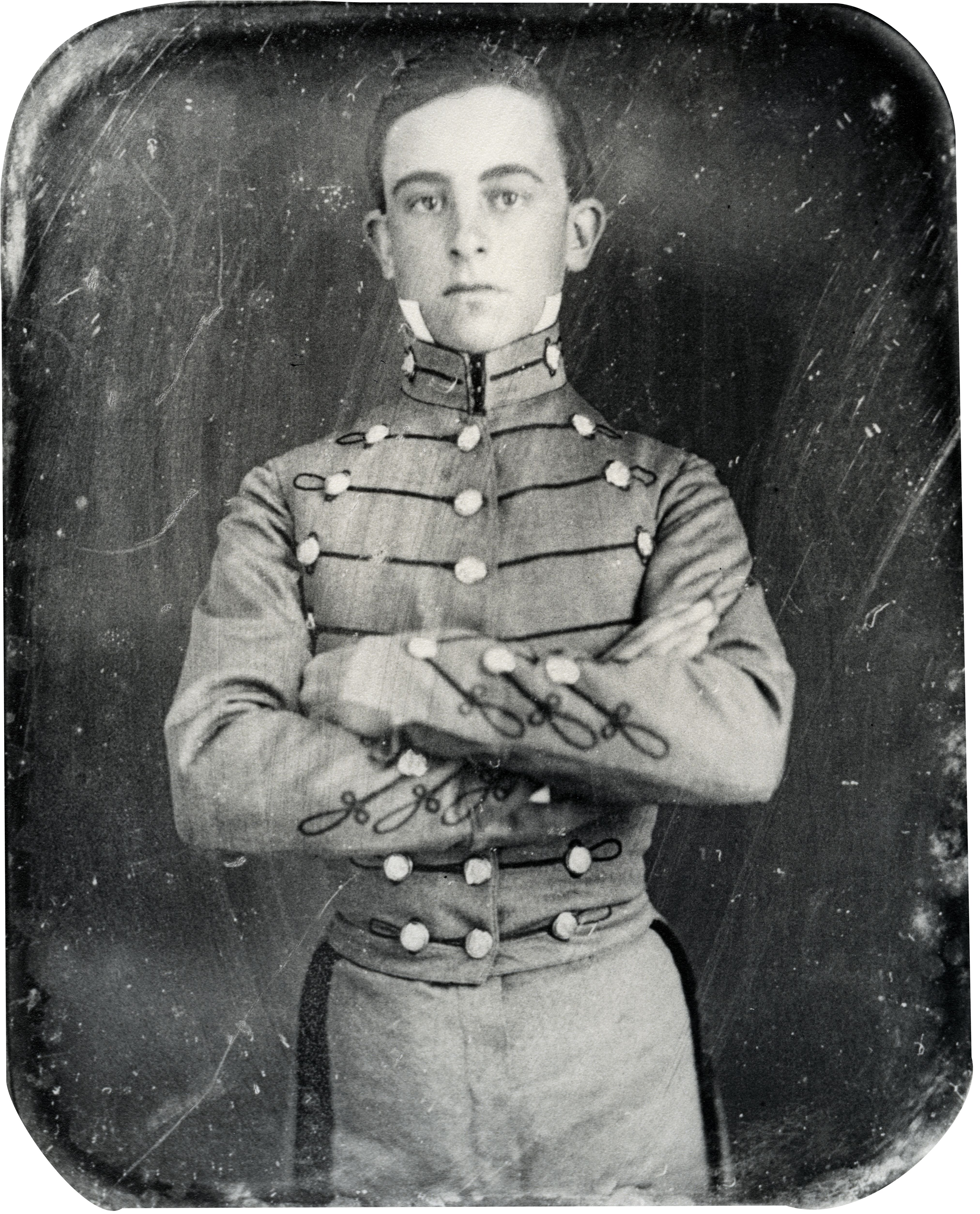
Taylor as a VMI cadet

Taylor was born on June 13, 1838, in Norfolk, Virginia. He was descended from the First Families of Virginia, being of entirely English descent. At least one of his paternal great-grandfathers, Capt. John Calvert, had fought for the Patriot cause in the American Revolutionary War. His maternal grandfather, Dr. Jonathan Cowdery, had been taken captive by pirates in Tripoli before the War of 1812 and lived to be the eldest officer in the U.S. Navy. He was a direct descendent of Richard Taylor an English politician who sat in the House of Commons in the 1660s as well as his father also named Richard Taylor who served in the House of Commons in the 1620s. Other ancestors included colonial era migrants William Farrar and Richard Cocke as well as English colonist Adam Thoroughgood and his wife Sarah. Throughgood (1604–1640) rose from buying his passage across the Atlantic Ocean by becoming an indentured servant, to become an early colonial leader (and militia captain) in Norfolk County. He helped name various areas in Norfolk County, particularly near the Lynnhaven River where he settled in the 17th century.

Following a local private education suitable for his class, including at Norfolk Academy, and despite his father's death, Walter Taylor went to Lexington, Virginia for higher studies. Walter H. Taylor Sr. probably owned 4 slaves during this Walter's youth. Cadet Taylor graduated from Virginia Military Institute (VMI) in 1857. He became a railroad clerk, and later a banker in Norfolk.

== American Civil War ==
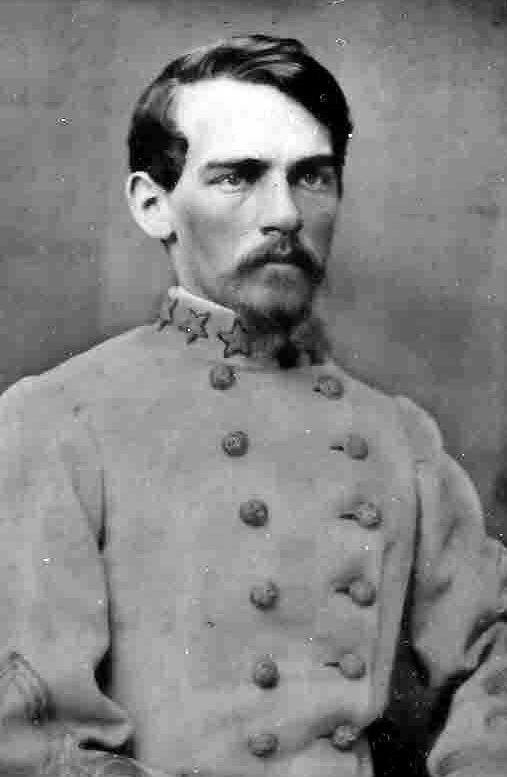
Colonel Taylor, c. 1864

After John Brown's raid on Harpers Ferry in 1859, Taylor joined a local militia company. After Virginia voters approved secession in April 1861 during the early days of the American Civil War, Taylor joined the Confederate States Army, as did others in his militia company and his elder brother, Richard Cornelius Taylor (1835-1917; who would become a Major before the war's end).

Walter Taylor was soon assigned to the staff of General Robert E. Lee, shortly after the General was given command of Confederate forces. Taylor became no ordinary staff officer, but effectively the chief aide-de-camp to General Lee throughout the war. Since Lee was noted for his small, over-worked staff, the exceedingly capable and tireless Taylor had many responsibilities. He wrote dispatches and orders for Lee, performed personal reconnaissance, and often carried messages in person to corps and division commanders. (He verbally transmitted the famous "if practicable" order from Lee to General Richard S. Ewell below Cemetery Hill during the Battle of Gettysburg.) Taylor greeted all people who came to see Lee, and usually decided whether they would be announced to the General. When General Lee assumed command of the Army of Northern Virginia in June 1862, during the Peninsula Campaign, Taylor became that army's assistant adjutant general. Taylor eventually attained a rank almost commensurate with his great staff responsibilities, being promoted to lieutenant colonel on December 12, 1863.

Ltc. Taylor accompanied General Lee during the surrender at Appomattox Court House. (In postbellum writings, he is generally referred to as "colonel", a customary abbreviated title.)

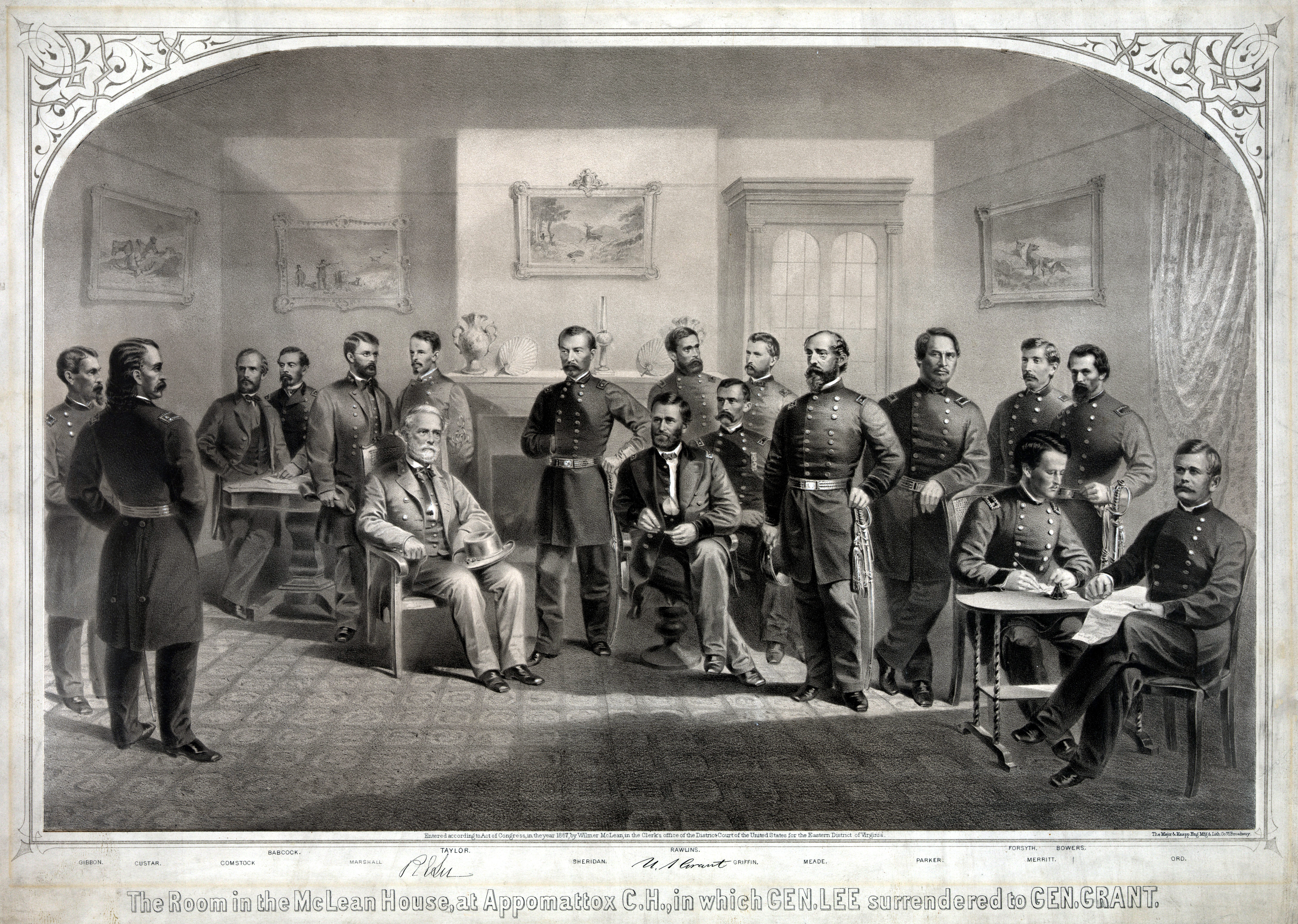
Lithograph of Lee's Surrender, with Taylor standing behind General Lee. (Zoom)

== Personal life ==
Taylor's fiancée was Elizabeth Selden "Bettie" Saunders, daughter of United States Navy Captain John Loyall Saunders and Mrs. Martha Bland Selden Saunders. During the war Miss Saunders lived with the family of Lewis D. Crenshaw in Richmond, Virginia, where she worked in the Confederate Mint and for the Surgeon General in the Confederate Medical Department.

In the last few days of the Siege of Petersburg, as Lee and his staff realized that Petersburg was lost and Richmond should be evacuated, General Lee gave the 26-year-old Taylor special permission to go to Richmond to give Miss Saunders "the protection of his name". A messenger sent ahead to Richmond advised his bride-to-be, who made arrangements with Reverend Dr. Charles Minnigerode, the rector of St. Paul's Episcopal Church.

After midnight, in the wee hours of April 3, 1865, just before evacuating Confederates set fire to the city and looters ran wild in its streets, Taylor and Miss Saunders were married in the Crenshaw house parlor. Afterward, Lewis Crenshaw accompanied Taylor as far back toward the Confederate lines as safety permitted. One week after the surrender at Appomattox Court House, Taylor returned to Richmond with General Lee, picked up his bride, and drove her back to Norfolk in a buggy.

They would have at least two daughters and three sons who reached adulthood.

== Postwar career ==
After the war, Taylor resumed his banking career in Norfolk, and also worked as an attorney, particularly for railroads which were rebuilding and consolidating after the war. He quickly received a pardon, then was elected to municipal offices and to the Virginia General Assembly as a Conservative (in the same election as adopted a new state Constitution which forbad slavery). Taylor served as a State Senator from 1869 until 1873, vehemently opposing the Readjuster Party.

On April 30, 1870, General Lee paid his last visit to the Norfolk area, accompanied by his daughter, Agnes Lee. He arrived in Portsmouth via railroad from North Carolina. Colonel Taylor met and escorted him through the waiting crowds to Norfolk, then to the Elizabeth River ferry. Lee would die less than five months later. In 1870, Taylor began his first term on the VMI Board of Visitors (serving until 1873); he would again serve on the VMI board from 1914 until his death.

In 1877, Taylor became president of the Marine Bank, where he would remain for 39 years. He later also served on the board of directors of the Norfolk and Western Railway. Near the end of the 19th century, Taylor helped develop the Ocean View area, located along the south shore of the Chesapeake Bay in Norfolk County. The project had been surveyed and laid out before the American Civil War by William Mahone, who also later became a Confederate General (serving under General Lee and then with the Readjusters whom Taylor had opposed after the war). Served by a narrow gauge railroad from Norfolk, which operated a steam locomotive named the "Walter H. Taylor", Ocean View blossomed as both a popular resort area and streetcar suburb of the City of Norfolk, which annexed the area in 1923.

In April 1907, while Taylor was the attorney for the new Virginian Railway, then under construction, he met the founder, millionaire industrialist Henry Huttleston Rogers and humorist Mark Twain when they arrived in Hampton Roads aboard Rogers' steam yacht Kanawha. They were in Norfolk to attend the opening ceremonies of the Jamestown Exposition held at Sewell's Point. According to published newspaper reports of the day, Twain drove off with Taylor in an "infernal machine," better known in modern times as an automobile.

== "Lost Cause" proponent ==
Taylor devoted a considerable portion of his postwar years to defending General Lee's reputation (which developed into the Lost Cause historiography), as well as settling controversies related to the Army of Northern Virginia. Although less vehement than the notoriously irascible former General Jubal Early, Taylor worked with the Louisiana-based Southern Historical Society. He was a member of several Confederate veterans organizations, including the Association of the Army of Northern Virginia and the United Confederate Veterans.

Former generals from both sides of the war made Taylor an unofficial court of last resort in settling disputes about their wartime reputations. Many generals petitioned him for information, so Taylor decided to write a book to set the record straight. He asked for permission from the U.S. government to view the national archives related to the Army of the Potomac and became the first Confederate granted such a privilege. Thus in 1877, he published Four Years with General Lee, which contained dozens of anecdotes about the former General. Because it contained much from the National Archives, it read more like a situation report than a novel, and was not widely popular at the time. Former Confederate General James Longstreet in particular claimed that if Col. Taylor ever wrote another book about the war, he hoped it would tell the "rest of the story." (Many former Confederates vilified Longstreet for not only his actions at Gettysburg, but also his postwar accommodation with the Republicans.) Col. Taylor did write another book, Robert E. Lee, His Campaign in Virginia, 1861–1865 (1906). Although it contained the same statistical information as his previous work, it read more like a novel, and quickly became a best seller.

== Death and legacy ==
Walter H. Taylor died of cancer on March 1, 1916. Walter H. Taylor Elementary School of the Norfolk City Public Schools is named in his honor.

== In popular media ==
Taylor is a character in the novel "The Killer Angels" (1974) by Michael Shaara, which won the Pulitzer Prize for Fiction in 1975. He is portrayed by Bo Brinkman in the novel's film adaption Gettysburg, and in the prequel Gods and Generals.

Taylor is a character in the following alternate history novels:

- The Guns of the South (1992) by Harry Turtledove
- "Gettysburg: A Novel of the Civil War" (2003), "Grant Comes East" (2004), and "Never Call Retreat" (2005) by Newt Gingrich and William R. Forstchen.

== Works by Taylor ==
Media related to Walter H. Taylor at Wikimedia Commons
Taylor, Walter H., Belmont, John S., Tower, R. Lockwood, Lee's Adjutant: The Wartime Letters of Colonel Walter Herron Taylor, 1862–1865, University of South Carolina Press, 1995, ISBN 1-57003-021-9.
