= Days of Infamy =

Days of Infamy may refer to one of two alternate history novels about the Japanese attack on Pearl Harbor, which brought the United States of America into World War II. The title alludes to President Franklin Roosevelt's speech to Congress asking for a declaration of war, which began, "Yesterday, December 7th, 1941 – a date which will live in infamy ...".

- Days of Infamy (2004) – the first of two books in the Days of Infamy series by Harry Turtledove.
- Days of Infamy (2008) – the second book in the Pacific War series by Newt Gingrich, William R. Forstchen, and Albert S. Hanser.
