= Henry Jackson Hunt =

American general and artillery tactician (1819–1889)

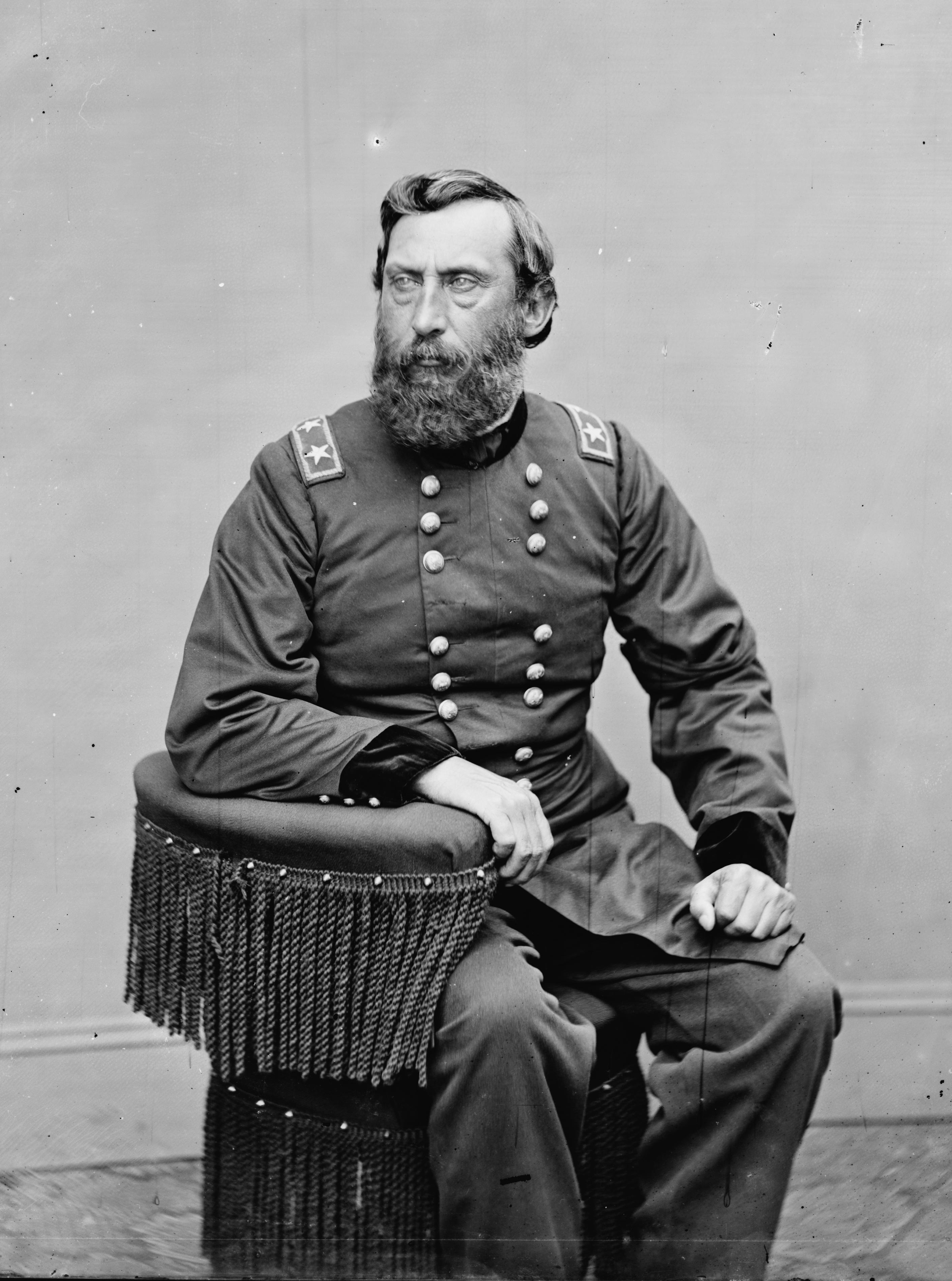
- Hunt c. 1860–1865
- Born: September 14, 1819; Detroit, Michigan, US
- Died: February 11, 1889 (aged 69); Washington, D.C., US
- Burial place: Soldiers' Home National Cemetery
- Military career
- Allegiance: United States; Union
- Branch: United States Army; Union Army
- Service years: 1839–1883
- Rank: Brigadier General; Brevet Major General
- Commands: Chief of Artillery; Army of the Potomac; 5th U.S. Artillery
- Conflicts: Mexican–American War; Battle of Chapultepec; Utah War; American Civil War; First Battle of Bull Run; Battle of Malvern Hill; Battle of Antietam; Battle of Fredericksburg; Battle of Gettysburg; Siege of Petersburg

Henry Jackson Hunt (September 14, 1819 – February 11, 1889) was Chief of Artillery in the Army of the Potomac during the American Civil War. Considered by his contemporaries the greatest artillery tactician and strategist of the war, he was a master of the science of gunnery and rewrote the manual on the organization and use of artillery in early modern armies. His courage and tactics affected the outcome of some of the most significant battles in the war, including Malvern Hill, Antietam, Fredericksburg, and most notably at Gettysburg, where his operational decisions regarding strategic cannon placement and conservation of ammunition for the Confederate main assault, contributed greatly to the defeat of Pickett's Charge.

== Early life and family ==
Hunt was born in the frontier outpost of Detroit to Samuel Wellington Hunt, an Army infantry officer who entered West Point in 1814 and died in 1829. He was named after his uncle, Henry Jackson Hunt, who was the second mayor of Detroit. His grandfather was Colonel Thomas Hunt, who served with distinction in the Continental Army throughout the American Revolution and served in the United States Army after the war until his death in 1808. Thus, Hunt was a hereditary member of the Massachusetts Society of the Cincinnati by right of his grandfather's service.

As a child in 1827, he accompanied his father on the expedition to the future Kansas Territory that founded Fort Leavenworth.

His brother, Lewis Cass Hunt, served throughout the Civil War in the infantry, becoming a brigadier general of volunteers in 1862, and brevet brigadier general in the Regular Army in 1865.

== Career ==
=== Mexican-American War and Instructions for Field Artillery ===
He graduated from the United States Military Academy in 1839 as a brevet second lieutenant in the 2nd U.S. Artillery. He served in the Mexican War under Winfield Scott, and was appointed a brevet captain for gallantry at Contreras and Churubusco and to major at Chapultepec. Hunt was a veteran member of the Aztec Club of 1847 and a First Class Companion of the Military Order of the Loyal Legion of the United States which were military societies of United States officers who had served in the Mexican War and Civil War respectively.

On October 5, 1856, Brevet Major Hunt commanded Company M, 2nd U.S. Artillery from Fort Leavenworth, that protected the polls at Eaton, Kansas, during the territorial legislature elections. Hunt served with the same unit during the Utah War in 1857 against the Mormons. His permanent (regular army) promotions to captain and major were in 1852 and 1861, respectively.

In 1856 Hunt was a member of a three-man board that revised field artillery drill and tactics for the army. The Instructions for Field Artillery manual written by the three (Hunt, William H. French, and William F. Barry) was published by the War Department in 1861 and was the "bible" of Northern field artillerists during the war. He was a principal proponent of the organizational doctrine that allowed infantry brigades to retain artillery batteries for close-in support, but that moved batteries formerly assigned to divisions and corps to an Artillery Reserve at the army level for more strategic control.

=== Civil War ===
==== First Bull Run through Chancellorsville ====
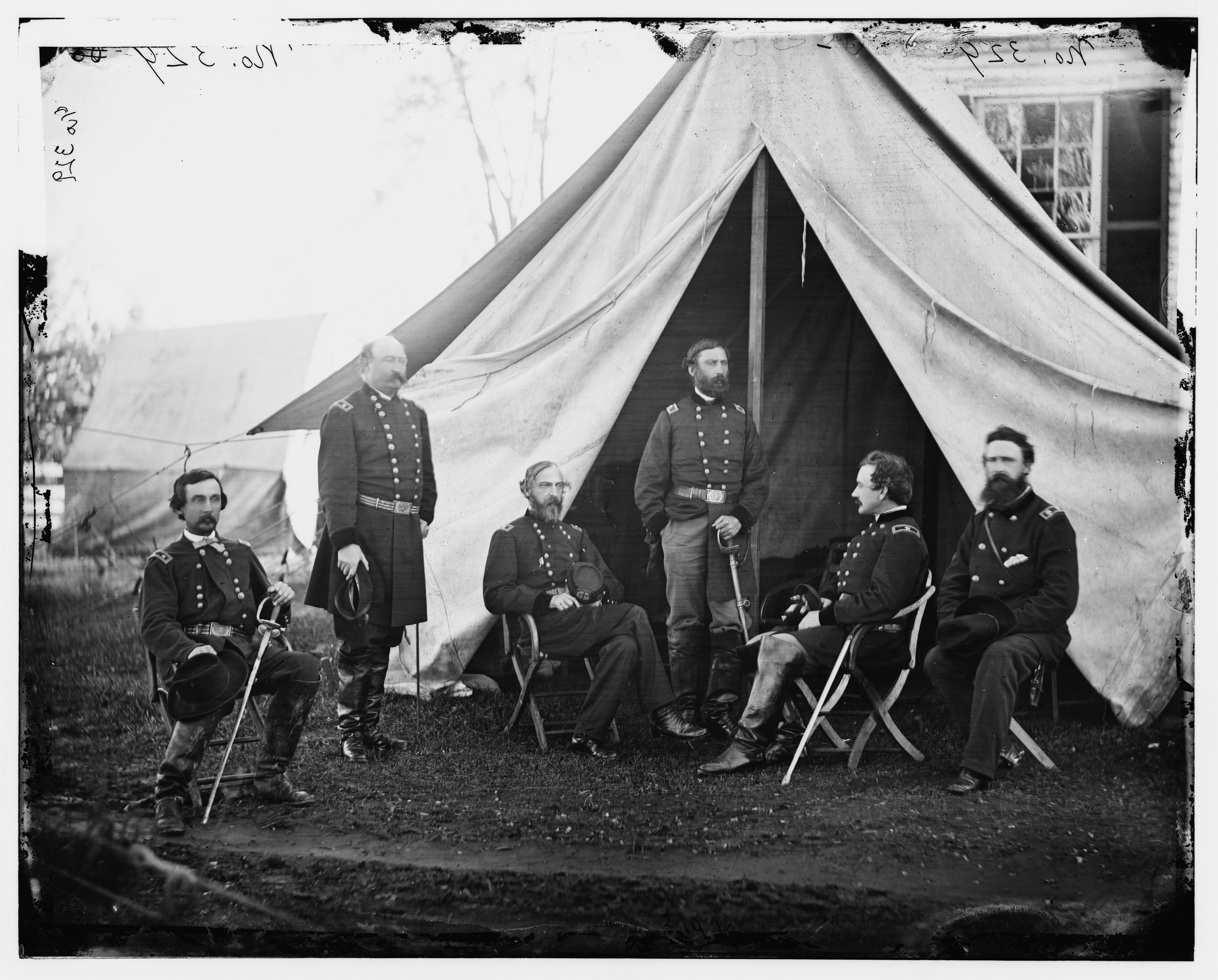
Commanders of the Army of the Potomac, Gouverneur K. Warren, William H. French, George G. Meade, Henry J. Hunt, Andrew A. Humphreys and George Sykes in September 1863.

Hunt achieved some fame in the First Battle of Bull Run in 1861, when his four-gun battery covered the retreat of a Union force with a close-in artillery duel. He soon afterward became chief of artillery in the Department of Northeast Virginia, defending Washington, D.C.

As a colonel on the staff of Maj. Gen. George B. McClellan, Hunt organized and trained the artillery reserve of the Army of the Potomac and fought with it in the Peninsula Campaign. Throughout the war he contributed more than any officer to the effective employment of the artillery arm. With the artillery reserve at the Battle of Malvern Hill, his 250 guns repelled repeated Confederate infantry assaults with such gruesome efficiency that the Union infantry had little to do. He personally commanded a group of 60 guns that he employed as if they were a single battery (usually Union batteries contained six guns).

On September 15, 1862, the day after the Battle of South Mountain, Hunt was promoted to brigadier general of volunteers and McClellan assigned him as chief of artillery in the Army of the Potomac for the imminent Battle of Antietam, where he deployed the Artillery Reserve to great effect. At the Battle of Fredericksburg in December, his gun emplacements on Stafford Heights effectively eliminated any possibility that Gen. Robert E. Lee could counterattack Union forces across the Rappahannock River.

In the run-up to the Battle of Chancellorsville in May 1863, Hunt fell out of favor of Army of the Potomac commander Maj. Gen. Joseph Hooker and lost direct command of the Artillery Reserve, reducing him in effect to an administrative staff role. The lack of coordination of the artillery forces that resulted from this snub were well recognized as a contributing factor in the embarrassing Union defeat. Although Hooker restored Hunt's command after three days of battle, it was too late to affect the outcome.

Hunt was also a proponent of artillery practices that reflected his conservative nature. Although acknowledging the power of massed batteries to repel infantry assaults (such as at Malvern Hill or against Pickett's Charge in the Battle of Gettysburg), he urged his gun crews to fire slowly and deliberately and reprimanded them if they exceeded an average of one shot per minute. He believed that faster rates impaired accurate targeting and depleted ammunition faster than could be replenished. A story often told about Hunt was when he exclaimed to a gunner of a fast-firing gun, "Young man, are you aware that every round you fire costs $2.67?" Fast firing also implied to him that the gun crew was not brave enough to stand fast on the battlefield, wanting to get back behind the lines for resupply.

==== Success at Gettysburg ====
Hunt's most famous service in the war was at the Battle of Gettysburg in July 1863. His new commander, Maj. Gen. George G. Meade, had considerably more respect for Hunt than Hooker did and not only gave him great latitude in directing the artillery, but also used him on occasion as his personal representative. For example, on July 2, Meade sent Hunt to visit III Corps commander Maj. Gen. Daniel E. Sickles in an attempt to get his defensive lines to conform to orders. (Sickles' insubordinate movement from Cemetery Ridge, where he had been ordered to defend, to the Peach Orchard caused considerable difficulty for the entire Union defense.) Hunt was unable to influence the irascible political general, but his masterful analysis of terrain and placement of batteries on the ridge were important factors in the Union's eventual success on the second day.

His handling of the artillery was conspicuous in the repulse of Pickett's Charge on July 3. During a morning inspection, Hunt observed activity in the Confederate lines and rightly concluded an assault was being readied. Later, with the Union line on Cemetery Ridge under massive bombardment from Longstreet's corps artillery chief, Col. Edward Porter Alexander, Hunt was able to resist command pressure from fiery II Corps commander Maj. Gen. Winfield S. Hancock who had demanded Union fire to lift the spirits of the infantrymen pinned down under Alexander's bombardment. Hunt ordered a stop to that counter-battery fire to conserve ammunition, reserving sufficient amounts for anti-personnel fire in the attack he knew was coming. Hunt also directed his cannons to cease fire slowly to create the illusion that they were being destroyed one by one, which fooled the Confederates into thinking his batteries were destroyed and triggered their disastrous charge. His concealed placement of Lt. Col. Freeman McGilvery's batteries north of Little Round Top caused massive casualties in the infantry assault. Hunt was rewarded for his service with the brevet of colonel in the Regular Army. Hunt reported in detail on the artillery's role at Gettysburg. He always maintained that the Confederate attack would never have happened had he been allowed to do what he'd intended—conserve his long-range ammunition during the initial southern bombardment, then hit them with everything he had when they lined up for their advance.

In addition to Instructions for Field Artillery, Hunt was the author of papers on Gettysburg in the Battles and Leaders series.

==== Siege of Petersburg ====
The rest of the war was an anticlimax for Hunt. He served in Virginia to the end of the war, managing the siege operations of Petersburg in 1864 and 1865. He was breveted major general both in the volunteers and in the Regular Army.

=== Postwar ===
When the U.S. Army was reorganized in 1866, Hunt became colonel of the 5th U.S. Artillery. He served as commanding officer of Fort Adams in Newport, Rhode Island, from May 20, 1869, until November 10, 1875, and as president of the permanent Artillery Board. Hunt held various commands until retirement from the Army in 1883.

== Later life ==
Upon retirement in 1883, Hunt become governor of the Soldiers' Home in Washington, D.C. He died in 1889 and is buried in the Soldiers' Home National Cemetery. Fort Hunt Park in Northern Virginia is named after Hunt.

== In popular media ==
Hunt is featured prominently in the alternate history novel Gettysburg: A Novel of the Civil War by Newt Gingrich and William R. Forstchen. He also appears in the sequel novels of the series, Grant Comes East and Never Call Retreat: Lee and Grant: The Final Victory.

== See also ==
- List of American Civil War generals (Union)
