= Terrible Swift Sword =

Terrible swift sword is a phrase from "The Battle Hymn of the Republic" by Julia Ward Howe.

Terrible Swift Sword may also refer to:

- Terrible Swift Sword (game), a 1976 board wargame that simulates the Battle of Gettysburg
- Terrible Swift Sword (The 4400), an episode of The 4400
- Terrible Swift Sword (The Lost Regiment), the third book in William R. Forstchen's The Lost Regiment science fiction book series
- Terrible Swift Sword, the second volume of Bruce Catton's Centennial History of the Civil War
