= Pacific War series =

Alternate history novel series

The Pacific War is a series of alternate history novels written by Newt Gingrich and William R. Forstchen with Albert S. Hanser. The series deals with the Pacific War between the United States of America and the Empire of Japan. The point of divergence is the decision of Admiral Isoroku Yamamoto, commander-in-chief of the Japanese Combined Fleet, to take personal command of the 1st Air Fleet for the attack on Pearl Harbor, rather than delegate it to Adm. Chūichi Nagumo.

== Pearl Harbor ==
Pearl Harbor: A Novel of December 8th
- First edition
- Author: Newt Gingrich; William R. Forstchen
- Language: English
- Genre: Alternate history novel
- Publisher: Thomas Dunne Books
- Publication date: May 15, 2007
- Publication place: United States
- Media type: Print (Hardback)
- Pages: 384
- ISBN: 0-312-36350-8
- OCLC: 85830772
- Dewey Decimal: 813/.54 22
- LC Class: PS3557.I4945 P43 2007
- Followed by: Days Of Infamy

The first novel, Pearl Harbor: A Novel of December 8th, covers the background up through the attack on the United States Navy base at Pearl Harbor, Hawaii. ("December 8th" is the date in Japan, on the west side of the International Date Line; the local time was December 7.)

The novel begins in Japan in 1934 where Lieutenant Commander James Watson of the US Navy and his equally-ranked friend Cecil Stanford of the British Royal Navy are guests of the Etajima Naval Academy, witnessing the harsh, aggressive training of recruits. They meet friendly young Lieutenant Mitsuo Fuchida of the Imperial Japanese Navy and the three discuss the growing military strength of Japan and the increasing political tensions across the Pacific.

In 1936, Stanford makes his report of his impressions of Japanese culture and their military & political ambitions to Winston Churchill. Back in Japan, Fuchida and Commander Genda Minoru formulate the new naval doctrines in which air-power will supersede the battleship as the prime weapon of the Imperial Fleet.

In December 1937, Watson is on board the US Navy gunboat USS Panay on the Yangtze River near Shanghai when it is strafed and sunk by Japanese aircraft despite the vessel clearly displaying the American flag. A few days later, Stanford, now a journalist, has the misfortune to witness, and narrowly escape (with the assistance of German businessman John Rabe), the brutal atrocities committed on the Chinese civilian population of Nanjing by the Imperial Japanese Army. Fuchida and Stanford meet in China but the latter's anger and disgust over recent events causes a falling-out between the two friends.

In September 1940, Genda, now a naval attaché in London, watches the Battle of Britain being fought over the English capital and he later gives his critical appraisal of the Campaign to USAAC Colonel Carl Spaatz.

January 1941. Watson, having lost one of his hands when the Panay sank and now living in Hawaii as a civilian, is recalled to duty as an Intelligence officer in the US Navy. He and his new friend and colleague Captain Tom Collingwood are assigned the task of deciphering Japanese coded communications. It proves to be a frustrating and laborious task.

February 1941. Admiral Yamamoto is advised by Genda on the crucial importance of naval airpower in the coming war with the West that seems inevitable.

June–September 1941. Fuchida strives to develop new techniques in attacking vessels in shallow-water harbors whilst Japanese Prime-Minister Konoye, with little authority over his country's armed forces, reluctantly submits plans for military expansion to the Emperor for approval. Stanford is in Hanoi when he hears the news of the Japanese decision to occupy French Indochina, signalling that the Japanese are prepared to openly provoke the West. The US begins an embargo on oil supplies to Japan and Emperor Hirohito secretly approves plans for military action.

October–November 1941. Genda manages to convince Yamamoto to personally command the naval task force assigned to mount a surprise attack on the US naval base at Pearl Harbor on Oahu in the Hawaiian Islands. Genda and Fuchida both feel that the original choice of commander, Admiral Nagumo, a ‘Battleship Admiral’ of the old school, lacks both conviction and a proper understanding of the new carrier tactics. Stanford is reassigned to Singapore by the now Prime-Minister Winston Churchill to report on the growing threat in the East. The Japanese carrier fleet sets sail from Japan on November 26 (Tokyo time), bound for Hawaii. On November 28, the US carrier USS Enterprise, Admiral William Halsey commanding, departs Pearl Harbor, bound for Wake Island with a cargo of fighter aircraft.

December 7, 1941 (December 8, Tokyo Time). The first and second waves of Japanese aircraft launched from the six fleet carriers of Yamamoto's Imperial Task Force located north of Hawaii attack Pearl Harbor and US Naval & Army airfields on Oahu. Watson witnesses at close hand the destruction of Battleship Row on Ford Island including the terrible losses of the battleships Arizona and Oklahoma. Fuchida, personally leading the attack, notes, as the second wave departs, that many of the harbor facilities including the main dry dock and the oil storage tanks along with all of the US submarines are still intact. Upon return to the flagship Akagi, Fuchida advises Yamamoto to launch a third strike, as does Genda. The Admiral agrees but decides to send only half the available bombers, retaining the rest as a reserve in case the so far un-located US carriers should appear.

Shortly before 3pm local time, the third wave arrives over Pearl Harbor. This time, the defences are on alert, putting up a dense anti-aircraft barrage which inflicts severe losses, the strike force losing a third of its aircraft. But the attackers cause heavy damage nonetheless, destroying No 1 dry-dock, the oil tank farms and the headquarters of the Pacific Fleet, killing the Commander-in-Chief Admiral Kimmel. In addition, a number of ships left intact after the earlier attacks are sunk or damaged, including all of the submarines still moored in the harbor. Fuchida, his aircraft badly damaged, barely makes it back to his carrier. The novel ends with Admiral Yamamoto grimly resolved to remain in Hawaiian waters until the battle is brought to a decisive conclusion and Admiral Halsey on board the USS Enterprise, less than a day's sail from Pearl Hearbor, mounting a search for the enemy fleet that he has vowed vengeance upon.

== Days of Infamy ==
Days Of Infamy
- First edition
- Author: Newt Gingrich; William R. Forstchen
- Language: English
- Genre: Alternate history novel
- Publisher: Thomas Dunne Books
- Publication date: April 29, 2008
- Publication place: United States
- Media type: Print (Hardback)
- Pages: 384
- ISBN: 978-0-312-36351-2
- Preceded by: Pearl Harbor

The novel begins where the previous book left off.

1800hrs on December 7, 1941, the Japanese carrier fleet is still 150 miles north of Oahu. The three air strikes that Yamamoto has dispatched to Oahu has cost him over 80 aircraft, leaving the fleet with just under 300 planes still airworthy. Yamamoto is grimly pleased with the results thus far but he is troubled by reports that the Japanese Foreign Ministry failed in their mission to deliver a formal declaration of war to the US prior to the air attacks, thus allowing the Americans to brand them as ‘sneak attacks’, igniting their anger and righteous indignation.

Yamamoto knows that the US Navy possesses at least three aircraft-carriers in the Pacific theatre. He dispatches two of his battleships, the Hiei and the Kirishima, to mount a nocturnal bombardment of Pearl Harbor, hoping to provoke a counter-strike by the US carriers, thus exposing the location of the latter. Chief-of-Staff Rear Admiral Kusaka expresses his grave reservations about the risks of using the battleships as bait.

Midnight, December 8 (local time). James Watson, his arm injured by shrapnel during the earlier attacks, has made his way home to his half-Japanese wife Margaret and his mother-in-law ‘Nan’ who is a Nisei, a first-generation Japanese immigrant to Hawaii of whom there are many thousands living on the islands. Watson has to quickly evacuate his family when the sudden enemy bombardment of Oahu begins, causing severe damage to both the harbor and Honolulu and provoking confused return fire by US coastal batteries, ‘friendly fire’ adding to the casualty toll. South-west of Oahu, Admiral Halsey, furious at this latest attack, immediately orders the Enterprise to move in closer in order to launch a counter-strike.

0100hrs. The US Navy manages to deliver its first return blow when a small force of warships led by Rear-Admiral Draemel on board the destroyer USS Ward, engages the Japanese battleships off the coast of Oahu. The gallant American force suffers heavy losses, including the Ward, taking Draemel with her along with the cruiser USS Minneapolis but they manage to score a torpedo hit on the Hiei, crippling the large battleship.

0200hrs. Having lost a full squadron of dive-bombers the previous day at Pearl Harbor, Halsey has only 56 aircraft remaining on the Enterprise with which to engage the entire Japanese fleet. He commits half of his available bombers to a full-out search for the enemy carriers. Meanwhile, Yamamoto has divided his carriers, despatching the Hiryu and Soryu, commanded by Admiral Ozawa, closer to Oahu to cover the crippled Hiei and guard against attacks from the south-east whilst the rest of the carriers are north-west of the islands, covering the west flank. The Japanese launch scout-planes to find the US carriers. On Oahu, Watson, Captain Collingwood and assistant Dianne St Clair desperately try to re-organise communications to co-ordinate the groups of US warships that are scattered throughout the Pacific and now converging on Hawaii.

0630hrs. As President Roosevelt delivers his famous Day of Infamy speech in Washington, US aircraft from the Enterprise attack the Hiei, further crippling her. One of Yamamoto's scout planes locates Halsey's task-force.

0730hrs. Aircraft from the IJN carriers Soryu and Hiryu attack Halsey's force, sinking the cruiser USS Salt Lake City and badly damaging the Enterprise, leaving her still able to launch but not recover her planes. The Enterprise launches what aircraft she has left-a mere two dozen-in a counter-strike against the Japanese flat-tops.

0945hrs. The Enterprise's attack is successful, scoring two hits on the carrier Soryu, leaving her temporarily out of action, but only seven planes survive to head to Oahu, including F4F pilot Lieutenant Dellacroce and dive-bomber pilot Lieutenant Dan Struble.

1100hrs. The Enterprise is attacked again by a second wave from Ozawa's force, the Japanese pilots believing it to be a second US carrier as Halsey's crew had extinguished the fires from the previous strike. Struck by bombs and torpedoes, the US carrier is desperately injured, perhaps mortally. In Washington, President Roosevelt confers with Admiral Stark and General Marshall, deciding that available resources need to be concentrated on defending Hawaii and that it is virtually impossible to relieve the embattled US forces defending the Philippines which have been invaded by the Imperial army.

1400hrs. US Task Force 12, comprising the carrier USS Lexington and her escorts, led by Admiral Newton, now enters the fray, having returned from Midway atoll where she had ferried aircraft prior to the Japanese attack.

1630hrs. A tiny force of sixteen aircraft, consisting of the surviving Enterprise planes and the last handful of flyable US Army aircraft at Hickam airfield on Oahu, makes a gallant attack on Yamamoto's main carrier force. Meeting heavy resistance, the motley flight is all but wiped out but Lt Dan Struble, dying and his aircraft afire, crash-dives into Yamamoto's flagship carrier, the Akagi. Lt Dave Dellacroce's F4F is one of only four planes to escape.

1730hrs. The atmosphere on Oahu is fearful, tense and angry with rumours and mis-information circulating everywhere. The National Guard are enforcing martial law. Groggy with pain and fatigue, Watson is driven home by Dianne who has just learnt her boyfriend, an Army pilot, was killed the previous day. There is a tense episode when Dianne meets Watson's Japanese wife & mother-in-law.

1750hrs. The crippled Hiei, now 30 miles south-west of Oahu, is torpedoed and sunk by the submarine USS Gudgeon.

1915hrs. The severely damaged Enterprise, thanks to a superhuman effort on the part of her crew, has managed to stay afloat and is commencing a slow, dangerous crawl to the safety of the West Coast of the US mainland.

0550hrs. December 9 (local time). A Japanese scout plane sights the location of Task Force 12. Shortly afterwards, a US submarine signals the location of Yamamoto's main force. Both sides launch air-strikes, the groups passing within sight of each other on the way to their respective targets. The Lexington is sunk, as is the already damaged Akagi. Newton and Yamamoto abandon their respective flagships. Yamamoto orders his fleet to withdraw.

1000hrs. An angry, drunken lynch-mob threaten to execute a young Japanese boy in the street where Watson's family are staying. Margaret is attacked by a would-be rapist but Dianne, armed with a pistol, keeps the mob at bay until National Guardsmen arrive to restore order.

Evening, December 10. Yamamoto receives a summons to appear before the Emperor, most likely to account for the losses his fleet has suffered. Although his fleet has inflicted severe damage on the Americans, the decisive victory that he yearned for has not occurred. Both sides resign themselves to a long, bitter conflict.

== Historical figures ==
- Franklin D. Roosevelt — U.S. President
- Milo F. Draemel — U.S. admiral
- William Halsey — U.S. admiral commanding Enterprise task force
- John H. Newton — U.S. admiral commanding Lexington task force
- Husband E Kimmel — U.S. admiral, C-in-C US Pacific Fleet
- Harold R Stark — U.S. admiral, chief of Naval Operations
- George C Marshall — U.S. general, chief-of-staff of the US Army
- Douglas Macarthur — U.S. Lt-general, commander US Army Forces Far East
- Carl Spaatz — US army air corps colonel
- Frederick C. Sherman- Captain, USS Lexington
- George D. Murray — Captain, USS Enterprise
- Winston Churchill — Cabinet Minister, later Prime Minister of the United Kingdom
- Joseph Grew — American diplomat, US ambassador to Japan 1932-1941
- John Rabe — German businessman living in Nanjing, 1937
- Isoroku Yamamoto — Japanese admiral
- Mitsuo Fuchida — Japanese naval aviator
- Minoru Genda — Japanese naval aviator
- Masatake Okumiya — Japanese naval aviator
- Ryunosuke Kusaka — Japanese rear-admiral & chief-of-staff
- Jisaburo Ozawa — Japanese vice-admiral
- Chuichi Nagumo — Japanese admiral
- Nishida Maseo — Captain of the IJN Battleship Hiei
- Fumimaro Konoe — Prime-Minister of Japan 1937-1941
- Kōki Hirota — Japanese foreign minister
- Hirohito — Emperor of Japan

== Historical warships ==
Although the sinkings of the USS Panay, USS Arizona and USS Oklahoma occurred in factual history as described in these alternate history novels, other warships that are damaged or sunk in the Pacific War series had, of course, different careers in real-life.

- USS Minneapolis — A New Orleans-class heavy cruiser commissioned 1934. Fought at the battles of Coral Sea, Midway, the Philippine Sea & Leyte Gulf. She was badly damaged at the Battle of Tassafaronga, November 1942. Survived war, decommissioned in 1947, scrapped in 1959.
- USS Salt Lake City — Pensacola-class heavy cruiser commissioned 1929. Escorted the Doolittle Mission to Tokyo and was involved with the Coral Sea and Midway battles. Fought at the Battles of Cape Esperance in October 1942 and Komandorski Islands in March 1943 and sustained damage in both. Survived war, decommissioned in 1947, used as a target-hull for gunnery practice and sunk in 1948.
- USS Ward — Wickes-class destroyer commissioned 1918. Had the distinction of firing the first American shot of the Pacific War when on the early morning of December 7, 1941, she shelled and sank a Japanese midget submarine attempting to enter Pearl Harbor. Converted to a Fast Transport in 1942, she saw active duty as an escort and a transport 1943–44. She was sunk by Kamikaze attack near Omac Bay, Leyte on December 7, 1944.
- USS Lexington — Early US aircraft carrier, commissioned in 1927. The ship was despatched on an abortive attempt to relieve the besieged Wake Island in December 1941. She was employed in mounting air-strikes against Japanese forces in Rabaul and New Guinea in February 1942. She later fought in the Battle of Coral Sea where she was sunk by Japanese aircraft from the IJN carriers Zuikaku and Shōkaku on May 8, 1942.
- USS Enterprise — The sixth US carrier to be constructed, she was commissioned in 1938. She fought in every major naval battle of the Pacific War involving carriers except Coral Sea. Escorted the USS Hornet on the Doolittle mission to Tokyo. Fought at the Battle of Midway in June 1942 where her aircraft sank the IJN carriers Akagi, Kaga and Hiryū. Fought at the Battles of the Eastern Solomons in August 1942 and Santa Cruz Islands in October 1942 and was badly damaged in both. Was involved in the battles of the Philippine Sea and Leyte Gulf in 1944. Participated in the Okinawa invasion and was twice damaged by Kamikazes in April & May 1945. Decommissioned in 1947 and, despite efforts to have her preserved as a museum, was scrapped in 1958.
- Akagi — Converted from an Amagi-class battlecruiser, the carrier was commissioned in 1927. Was the flagship of the carrier fleet that attacked Pearl Harbor on December 7, 1941. Her aircraft participated in air-strikes against Allied forces in Rabaul, northern Australia and Ceylon. Fought at the Battle of Midway. Attacked and set aflame by dive-bombers from USS Enterprise on June 4, 1942. Scuttled in the early hours of June 5.
- Soryu — One of the first Japanese carriers to be designed from the keel up as an aircraft-carrier, she was commissioned in 1937. Participated in the Pearl Harbor operation and later was responsible for air strikes against Wake Island, northern Australia and Ceylon. Fought at the Battle of Midway. She was dive-bombed by aircraft from the USS Yorktown on the morning of June 4, 1942 and, mortally damaged, was scuttled that evening.
- Hiei — One of the Kongō-class battleships, was commissioned in 1914. After Pearl Harbor, she remained as an escort for the Japanese carrier fleet on the latter's operations in the first half of 1942. Participated in the Midway campaign and in the early actions of the Solomons campaign. Fought at the First Naval Battle of Guadalcanal on November 13, 1942, and was badly damaged. Attempting to withdraw the following day, she was subjected to multiple attacks by both US army and naval aircraft until she was abandoned and sunk on the evening of November 14.

== See also ==
- Days of Infamy series by Harry Turtledove
- Gettysburg: A Novel of the Civil War
