= The Lost Regiment =

Science fiction novel series by William R. Forstchen

The Lost Regiment is a series of eight science fiction novels written by William R. Forstchen.

== Plot ==
The plot revolves around a Union Army regiment and an artillery battery from the American Civil War, which got transported to an alien world. The 35th Maine Infantry Regiment and the 44th New York Light Artillery Battery travelled to a different world when a portal emerged from a mysterious electrical storm and their transport ship, the Ogunquit, passed through. The alien world was populated by descendants of medieval Russians (or "Rus"), who still lived at a medieval level of technology. They learned that there were various civilizations on this world made up of descendants of people from various eras of Earth's history.

The Union soldiers eventually discovered that the Russians had been hiding the existence of the Tugar from them. The Tugars were ten-foot-tall aliens with a brutal nomadic culture and technology similar to that of the Earth's late Bronze to early Iron Age. They rode a never-ending circuit around the planet and subjugated the human population in their territory for food. The Tugars visited each human society once a generation and culled part of the population for food so that the humans stay docile, compliant and never advanced enough to challenge them. The Union men were horrified by this revelation and kill the Tugars advanced scouts. They supported a peasant rebellion against the Tugar-appointed lords and begin modernizing Russian society. When the Tugars arrived, they encountered a semi-modern army equipped with cannons and smoothbore muskets. In a hard-fought battle, the humans managed to prevail, weakening the Tugars forever.

The next several books take up the story a few years later. The Russians had begun to explore the possibilities of a union with the Roum, descendants of Romans who lived next to their territory and were spared from the Tugar depredation by the Russian victory. Meanwhile, they faced a renewed threat from the Merki, members of the same alien race as the Tugars. The Merki make the same circumnavigation of the globe as the Tugars do but in a zone further south. Once the Merki learn of the Tugar's weakening, they seek to take advantage of the Russians, realizing the disastrous effects that would come from an industrialized enemy. They seek to maintain their racial dominance over the humans through the annihilation of those who have learned the secrets of gunpowder and industrialization. The Merki are aided by a group of Union sailors who fled the Tugar war on the ship which brought the Union soldiers to this world. In exchange for their survival, the humans help the Merki develop firearms and other technology. The Merki attack is more successful than the Tugar one and forces the humans to abandon the Russian territory in a scorched earth campaign, but eventually, they win with their use of airships, trains, rocket artillery, and one very effective telescopic sniper rifle.

Several years later, the expanding human Republic faces a new threat in the form of the Bantag. The Bantag are a Horde from even further south. They are led by a member of their race who arrived from another world that has a mid 20th-century level of technology. This alien, a soldier in his own world, assumes a messianic role among the Bantag and modernizes their society to surpass that of the humans. He is familiar with atomic reactors as well as centerfire rifles and tanks. The Bantag scavenge engines from decaying cities abandoned by their people millennia ago and use them to power airships. The reader learns that the people of the Bantag had once been a technologically advanced star-faring race, visiting many different planets and seeding teleportation devices across them. The Bantag homeworld collapsed in a nuclear war but the teleportation devices remained sporadically active and ended up transporting various humans to the planet Valennia (the location of the novel), though Valennia was not the homeworld of the Tugar, Merki, and Bantag Hordes. Using their advanced technology, the Bantag attacked the new human Republic, introducing steampunk tanks and 20th-century mortars to the world of Valennia. However, the humans developed their own steampunk tanks, steam-powered gatling guns, and armor piercing artillery shells and organized a counterattack. Ultimately, it was not an arms race but instead it was the Republic fomenting revolution amongst the Chin, people descended from ancient China, that defeated the Bantag Horde.

The final book in the series, Down to the Sea, takes place a generation after the arrival of the Union soldiers. With the children of the original regiment members reaching adulthood, they face a new threat from across the southern sea, the Kazan Empire, who have an early 20th-century level of technology and who also have a selectively bred slave race of human assassins, warriors, and spies called the Shiv. The Shiv are controlled by a nihilistic religious Order that seeks to control the mysterious Portals of their ancestors. The book ends as if a tenth novel was planned but never written and/or published.

== Titles ==
1. Rally Cry (1990)
2. Union Forever (1991)
3. Terrible Swift Sword (1992)
4. Fateful Lightning (1992)
5. Battle Hymn (1997)
6. Never Sound Retreat (1998)
7. A Band of Brothers (1999)
8. Men of War (1999)
9. Down to the Sea (2000)

== 35th Maine ==
The 35th Regiment, Maine Volunteer Infantry is a fictional volunteer regiment (Maine really raised 32 Infantry regiments) during the American Civil War in William Forstchen's The Lost Regiment series. (The regiment is based on Joshua Chamberlain's 20th Maine Infantry.)

Before the series Andrew Lawrence Keane is a lieutenant who assumed command when a superior officer was KIA at Antietam. Keane's leadership under the guidance of his sergeant, Hans Schuder, made them ripe for promotion as they progressed through Fredericksburg, Cold Harbor and Gettysburg.

At the start of the series, Keane is promoted to colonel after losing his arm at Gettysburg. Hans Schuder was recently promoted to sergeant major. In the world of Valennia, the 35th becomes essentially a vassal force to Boyar Ivor of the "Rus" people, who appear to be derived from early Russian peoples earlier transported to Valennia. When Ivor is overthrown, it becomes the core of the anti-Tugar resistance, with Keane filling as a military dictator. As time goes on, the men of the 35th are rapidly promoted to fill the officer corps of the Rus Army and train the Rus forces. When all hope seemed lost, the Rus broke ranks in the Tugar War, the 35th reformed and made a desperate last defense.

After the Tugar War, the 35th becomes the most respected regiment, on which the Army of Russia is centered. Analogous to the United States Military Academy at West Point, the 35th is the best that Rus has to offer and provides a place to train new officers for the Army of the Republic. Even some men from the original 35th remain in the regiment when they could otherwise be high-ranking officers.

Men from the original 35th include (in progress):

- Andrew Keane (Colonel)
- Hans Schuder (Sergeant Major)
- Barry (Sergeant)
- Tim Kindred
- Hank Petracci
- Chuck Ferguson
- Gates
- Vincent Hawthorne
- Jim Hinsen
- John Mina
- Emil Weiss (regimental surgeon)

== See also ==
- Destroyermen
- Ranks of Bronze
- The Excalibur Alternative
