= Bantag =

Bantag may refer to:

- Gerald Bantag, former Director-General of the Bureau of Corrections in the Philippines
- Bantag, a fictional entity in The Lost Regiment novels by William R. Forstchen
