= Rally Cry =

Rally Cry may refer to:

- Rally Cry (album) by Arkells, 2018
- Rally Cry (novel) by William R. Forstchen, 1990
