= One Second After =

2009 novel by William R. Forstchen

- First edition cover
- Author: William R. Forstchen
- Language: English
- Genre: Post-apocalyptic
- Publisher: Forge
- Publication date: March 17, 2009
- Publication place: United States
- Media type: Print (hardcover and trade paperback) and audiobook (audio-CD)
- Pages: 350 pages
- ISBN: 0-7653-1758-3
- OCLC: 243544624
- Dewey Decimal: 813/.54 22
- LC Class: PS3556.O7418 O54 2009

One Second After is a 2009 science fiction novel by American writer William R. Forstchen. The novel deals with an unexpected electromagnetic pulse attack on the United States as it affects the people living in and around the small American town of Black Mountain, North Carolina.

Released in March 2009, One Second After was ranked as number 11 on the New York Times Best Seller list in fiction in May 2009. A trade paperback edition was released in November 2009.

== Plot ==
John Matherson is a professor of history at the local Montreat Christian College. A retired U.S. Army colonel and Gulf War veteran, he had moved to Black Mountain with his family when his late wife Mary, a native of the town, was dying from cancer. He is now the widowed father of two daughters, Elizabeth and Jennifer.

At 4:50 p.m. (16:50) Eastern Daylight Time on the second Tuesday of May, the first day described in the book's narration, the phone lines in the town suddenly go dead, along with all the electrical appliances. Within hours it becomes clear that this is no ordinary blackout. Every modern electrical device is disabled, destroyed by what Matherson is beginning to suspect was an electromagnetic pulse (EMP) attack on the United States.

The United States has effectively been returned to the 18th century, with few 21st-century people able to deal with such conditions. Matherson later remarks that survivors have had to rely on the technology of the early 16th century. His immediate concern is his twelve-year-old daughter, Jennifer, who has Type 1 diabetes. Without a constant supply of insulin, which requires refrigeration, she will die.

The book explores how the whole community responds, as many others face similar crises. Matherson's experience and character help him with the town's residents. Hundreds of motorists are stranded when their vehicles stop. They get into town, making the residents feel threatened by the numbers of people needing help. An immediate concern is food. No refrigerators or freezers are running, nor are grocery stores receiving supplies.

Residents of the nursing home in town, where Matherson's elderly cancer-stricken father-in-law is being cared for, are at risk. The elderly and frail need refrigerated medicines, and many require constant nursing care. The EMP has disabled the nursing home's generator. There are no AM/FM radio broadcasts, no television, no Internet, and thus, no communication with anyone outside the town is possible. It takes two months before a working antique telephone can connect Black Mountain with the nearby town of Swannanoa.

Matherson's in-laws are car collectors who happen to own a 1959 Edsel, and a Mustang. These are not affected by the EMP as they have no sensitive electronics. Similarly a resident's vintage airplane is newly useful, because it has no vulnerable electronics.

Without modern sanitation and supplies, diseases surge. Minor wounds become seriously infected, and the community has soon exhausted its supply of antibiotics. The social order in Black Mountain begins to break down. It is too late in the year to plant and harvest crops. Suddenly, skills not needed in several generations have become critically necessary. The town organizes its young and able-bodied to defend against a marauding band of cannibals. When they attack, there is a violent and deadly battle with high fatalities.

Matherson leads several battalions of college students into battle against the marauding Posse. The college's resource officer is killed and two-thirds of the students die. After the battle the Posse leader is captured and hanged on the interstate. Matherson releases several remaining Posse members, saying that they were not going to do any more harm.

After a while, the extreme shortages of food require rationing. Increasingly, Matherson assumes a growing leadership role as the situation deteriorates. He and other leaders struggle with the multiple issues and moral choices. Matherson's daughter, Jennifer, eventually dies due to a lack of insulin and is buried near the family home.

One year later, the U.S. military arrives to rebuild and aid the town. It is learned that the EMP was generated by three nuclear missiles launched from offshore container ships. One was launched from the Gulf of Mexico and detonated in the upper atmosphere over Utah, Kansas, and Ohio. The container ship was sunk by an explosion immediately after the missile launch; no one knows who was responsible for the attacks. Another missile was fired from off the Icelandic coast and detonated over East Europe and Russia. This launch affected major cities such as St. Petersburg and Moscow and everything in between. Another nuclear missile was detonated over South Korea and Japan.

The U.S. government believed that an alliance between North Korea and Iran conducted the attacks, and retaliated by striking both countries with nuclear weapons. The U.S. withdrew all of its overseas military forces to aid in rebuilding and humanitarian work at home. The EMP attack brought down Air Force One, and the U.S. president died upon impact.

One year after the EMP attack, the United States is described as having 30 million survivors, down ninety percent from a pre-attack population of 300 million. The People's Republic of China is occupying the U.S. west coast with a 500,000-strong occupation force, and Mexico occupies its former territory of the American Southwest and Texas, as a protectorate against China.

The book also explores the increasingly intimate relationship Matherson develops with Makala Turner, a single, childless nurse among those stranded by the pulse.

== Characters ==
- John Matherson – A widowed professor of history at the local Montreat Christian College and retired U.S. Army colonel, who rises to a position of responsibility as the crisis in his community develops.
- Elizabeth Matherson – John's sixteen-year-old daughter.
- Jennifer Matherson – John's twelve-year-old daughter, who has Type 1 diabetes.
- Jen – The mother of John's deceased wife, Mary. Jenny is a gentle Southern matriarch who is very close with John and his daughters.
- Makala Turner – A supervising nurse for a cardiac surgical unit from Charlotte, North Carolina who is stranded in Black Mountain on her way to a medical conference in Asheville on the day of the EMP strike.
- Charlie Fuller – John Matherson's close friend and Black Mountain's Director of Public Safety, in charge of the town's fire and police departments.
- Washington Parker – A retired Marine sergeant major who is Head of Campus Security at Montreat Christian College.
- Dan Hunt – The well-respected president of Montreat Christian College, whose life Bob Scales saved during the Vietnam War.
- Jim Bartlett – John's eccentric neighbor who owns the local Volkswagen repair shop and supplies the town with working vehicles after the EMP attack.
- Doc Kellor – Black Mountain's local doctor.
- Tom Barker – Black Mountain's chief of police.
- Don Barber – Owner of a functioning Aeronca L-3 who provides crucial intelligence to the community, especially regarding the advance of the Posse, through his reconnaissance flights.
- Kate Lindsey – Black Mountain's mayor at the time of the EMP attack.
- Ben Johnson – Elizabeth Matherson's boyfriend and later fiancé.
- Bob Scales – John's friend, a high-ranking worker at the Pentagon who acts as the girls' godfather, got John his position at the college, and saved Dan Hunt's life in the Vietnam War.

== Non-fiction afterword ==
The book contains a brief non-fiction afterword by U.S. Navy Captain William Sanders, regarding EMPs, which includes references to the reports of the United States EMP Commission and the book The Effects of Nuclear Weapons by Samuel Glasstone and Philip J. Dolan, published by the United States Department of Defense, which is a technical description based on early nuclear tests.

== Reception ==
One Second After was released on March 17, 2009, and a trade paperback edition was released on November 24, 2009. The book reached the number 11 position on The New York Times best-seller list in fiction on May 3, 2009.

== Adaptation ==
The option for the film rights to One Second After was initially sold to Warner Bros., but has subsequently expired. As of August 2011, a new option was being negotiated with another unknown studio.

In November 2021 the TV rights for the book series were licensed MPI Original Films. J. Michael Straczynski is involved with the production and will be writing the pilot. Filming is set to begin in Bulgaria in September 2025. Scott Rogers is directing the picture, with Forstchen serving as an executive producer.

== Sequels ==
A sequel, One Year After: A John Matherson Novel, was released on September 15, 2015. The plot premise is: "One Second After was a dire warning of what might be our future...and our end. Now, One Year After returns to the small town of Black Mountain, and the man who struggled so hard to rebuild it in the wake of devastation-John Matherson. It is a thrilling follow-up and should delight fans in every way."

The third book in the series, The Final Day: A John Matherson Novel, was released on January 3, 2017. In this book, it is revealed that only 30 million Americans survived up to this time. A fourth book in the series, ‘’Five Years After: A John Matherson Novel’’, was released on August 22, 2023.

== See also ==
- Lucifer's Hammer
- Alas, Babylon
