= 1945 (Gingrich and Forstchen novel) =

1995 novel by Newt Gingrich and William R. Forstchen

- First edition
- Author: Newt Gingrich; William R. Forstchen
- Language: English
- Genre: Alternate history
- Publisher: Baen Books
- Publication date: August 1, 1995
- Publication place: United States
- Media type: Print (hardback & paperback)
- Pages: 400 pp
- ISBN: 978-0-671-87739-2
- OCLC: 35717489
- Dewey Decimal: 813.54
- LC Class: PS3557.I4945

1945 is an alternate history novel written by Newt Gingrich and William R. Forstchen in 1995 that described the period immediately after World War II in which the United States had fought only against Japan, which allowed Nazi Germany to force a truce with the Soviet Union, and the two victors confront each other in a Cold War, which swiftly turns hot.

== Plot ==
At the start of the novel, the United States, having defeated the Empire of Japan, is in no mood to enter a new war, and Americans accept the fait accompli of German domination over most of Europe. A Cold War seems in the offing, and even the British, with a German-dominated Europe at their doorstep, squander much of their resources on a colonial war in the former French Indochina.

US President Andrew Harrison (a fictional character) has a summit with Adolf Hitler in Reykjavík, Iceland. The meeting goes badly, both leaders sharply confront each other, and Hitler secretly decides to accelerate preparations for a surprise attack on both the United States and the United Kingdom. As part of the preparations, a beautiful German spy seduces and suborns the White House Chief of Staff and makes him a key German spy.

The book's protagonist, Lieutenant Commander James Martel, at the incipient Head of Naval Intelligence at the American embassy in Berlin, is one of the few who suspects the gathering storm by watching the new weapons displayed at the parade commemorating Germany's victory over the Soviet Union and encountering the well-known commando Otto Skorzeny, who is his main opponent throughout the book.

Skorzeny makes meticulous secret preparations for raids to destroy the American atomic bomb programs at Oak Ridge National Laboratory and Los Alamos National Laboratory. (During the book's war with Japan, the Manhattan Project was put on the back burner, making the 1945 United States far from already possessing a nuclear bomb.) The bulk of the book is devoted to Martel, who was back in the United States, getting a glimmer of the threatened attack and unsuccessfully trying to sound a warning.

The German raid takes place, and though the Germans are eventually beaten back – Tennessee's Alvin York shows up, and, despite being no longer young, gives a good account of himself – the raid causes great damage by killing key scientists and setting the American nuclear program behind Germany's. The Germans also seize the uranium mines in the Congo region while they launch an all-out war against the United Kingdom.

The book ends with a cliffhanger. Erwin Rommel invades Scotland, the British face a desperate fight, and British Prime Minister Winston Churchill implores the Americans to "come quickly, this is much worse than 1940."

A promised sequel has failed to appear as of 2025.

== Reception ==
A review in the Chicago Tribune said, "The story isn't the biggest problem; it's the pages of putrid prose that make the book so tough to stomach." A 1996 review in The Washington Post commented that "for every 100 copies that his hopeful publisher sent forth into the world, 81 came back, unsold." It also noted good reviews in the National Review, the Atlanta Journal-Constitution and Asimov's Science Fiction.

== See also ==
- Axis victory in World War II
