= Never Call Retreat =

2005 novel by Newt Gingrich and William R. Forstchen

Never Call Retreat: Lee and Grant: The Final Victory
- First edition
- Author: Newt Gingrich; William R. Forstchen; Albert S. Hanser
- Cover artist: Wanda Tinasky
- Language: English
- Genre: Alternate history novel
- Publisher: Thomas Dunne Books
- Publication date: June 18, 2005
- Publication place: United States
- Media type: Print (Hardcover & Paperback)
- Pages: 496 pp (1st edition)
- ISBN: 0-312-34298-5 (1st edition)
- OCLC: 58422529
- Dewey Decimal: 813/.6 22
- LC Class: PS3557.I4945 N48 2005
- Preceded by: Grant Comes East

Never Call Retreat: Lee and Grant: The Final Victory is the conclusion of an alternate history trilogy by former Speaker of the U.S. House of Representatives Newt Gingrich, William R. Forstchen, and Albert S. Hanser. It was published in 2005 by Thomas Dunne Books. The other two books are Grant Comes East and Gettysburg: A Novel of the Civil War. The novel is illustrated with actual photographs of the Civil War, taken somewhat out of context.

== Plot ==
General Lee's army has defeated the Army of the Potomac at Gunpowder River. General Grant, having transported his army from the west and refitting it in Harrisburg, Pennsylvania, makes the first move. As the newly minted Army of the Susquehanna, his troops match southward down the Cumberland Valley toward Virginia. General George Armstrong Custer learns of Lee's movement of the pontoon train from a loyal Union railroad man. Custer decides it is an important enough prize that he must abandon his current mission, leaving General Darius N. Couch without proper screening forces.

The novel goes into extensive detail regarding battle plans, troop movements, and military strategies over a period of three days. In the end, Grant wins, but barely. After Lee's surrender, Grant paroles Lee and his army, and declares a 30-day, unilateral truce, ostensibly to give the paroled Confederates time to return home, but more so to give Confederate President Jefferson Davis time to "come to his senses" and realize the war has been lost. Without an army, Davis is left with no choice but to surrender, ending the war.

== Reception ==
Kirkus Reviews said that this novel was "reasonably well-written and plausible, with excellent period photographs as a bonus. Still, there's so much good Civil War history to read that this what-if exercise seems more than a touch unnecessary." Brad Hooper in his review for Booklist said that "as in the previous volumes in the trilogy, the authors' research is impeccable, and their presentation brings events down to a personal level, and, as in any good alternative vision of history, the reader is left believing it could really have happened this way."

== Historical figures ==
- Judah Benjamin, Confederate secretary of state
- George Armstrong Custer, U.S. general
- Jefferson Davis, Confederate president
- Ulysses S. Grant, U.S. general
- Winfield Scott Hancock, U.S. general
- Robert E. Lee, Confederate general
- Abraham Lincoln, U.S. president
- James Longstreet, Confederate general
- James B. McPherson, U.S. general
- Phillip Sheridan, U.S. general
- George Sykes, U.S. general
- Elihu B. Washburne, U.S. congressman
- Henry Jackson Hunt, U.S. chief of artillery
- Ely S. Parker, U. S. colonel, aide to General Grant.
