= Days of Infamy series =

Novel by Harry Turtledove

Days of Infamy is a two-novel alternate history of the initial stages of the Pacific War by Harry Turtledove.

The major difference is that the Empire of Japan not only attacks Pearl Harbor, but follows it up with the landing and occupation of Hawaii.

== Days of Infamy ==
Days of Infamy
- First edition cover
- Author: Harry Turtledove
- Cover artist: Steve Stone
- Language: English
- Genre: Alternate history
- Publisher: New American Library
- Publication date: November 2, 2004
- Publication place: United States
- Media type: Print (hardback & paperback)
- Pages: 448 pp (first edition)
- ISBN: 0-451-21307-6 (first edition)
- OCLC: 55054913
- Dewey Decimal: 813/.54 22
- LC Class: PS3570.U76 D395 2004

In Days of Infamy, the logic of how the battle could have developed in Oahu is that the point of divergence occurs at a conference in March 1941, when Commander Minoru Genda and Admiral Yamamoto manage to convince the Imperial Japanese Army to follow up the Pearl Harbor air attack with an invasion to capture Hawaii whereas in reality, they did not.

As is usual in Turtledove novels, the action occurs from several points of view, including historical figures such as Minoru Genda and Mitsuo Fuchida. Besides these historical figures, viewpoint characters include a corporal in the Japanese Army, a surfer (who invents the sailboard so he can fish once Honolulu is occupied), a pair of 20-something Nisei brothers caught between the warring cultures, prisoners of war, and others.

The way that control of the islands is established is that after a third wave of the Japanese air attack on Pearl Harbor (instead of two in reality) destroys the American naval fuel depots, army barracks, and all airfields on Oahu thus establishing air superiority, an amphibious landing is carried out on December 8, 1941 on the northern shores of the island and drive what little U.S. forces remain towards Honolulu. In the meantime, the Imperial Japanese Navy destroys U.S. Admiral William F. Halsey's fleet by sinking the American carriers USS Enterprise and Lexington while they fruitlessly try to counterattack. (It is implied that Halsey himself is killed.) After weeks of fierce fighting and nowhere to retreat, U.S. forces on Oahu (led by Admiral Kimmel and General Short) surrender and the Territory of Hawaii is annexed to Japan.

With the United States' main forward base in the Pacific conquered and much of its fleet crippled beyond repair, this allows Japan to dominate much of the southern Pacific Ocean almost unopposed from successfully defeating the British in the Indian Ocean, occupying all of New Guinea and the Dutch East Indies, attacking Australia, capturing Wake and Midway Islands, and having the ability to launch bombing raids on the West Coast of the United States. But there is a version of the Doolittle Raid that is also featured, where it is remembered as when America struck back at Hawaii, and not Japan in reality, but doing little damage.

In June 1942, there is a reverse version of the Battle of Midway where an American task force attempting to invade Oahu is defeated when the Japanese make use of captured American radar systems on the island, and the carriers USS Yorktown and Saratoga are lost while the USS Hornet is badly damaged.

The novel ends when, as was common in their other occupied territories, the Japanese create a puppet government which is the revived Kingdom of Hawaii, ruling through a member of the Hawaiian Royal Family installed as King in the Iolani Palace; The Americans back on the mainland, humiliated by their losses to the Japanese, swear revenge and begin a massive military buildup that sets the stage for the second novel.

== End of the Beginning ==
End of the Beginning
- First edition
- Author: Harry Turtledove
- Cover artist: Steve Stone
- Language: English
- Genre: Alternate history
- Publisher: New American Library
- Publication date: November 1, 2005
- Publication place: United States
- Media type: Print (hardback & paperback)
- Pages: 448 pp (first edition)
- ISBN: 0-451-21668-7 (first edition)

End of the Beginning carries the story forward through the rest of the occupation. By mid-1943, Japanese occupation of Hawaii has brought a toll of strict food rationing, severe martial law, and American prisoners (military and civilian) suffer abuses from their occupiers. However, the occupation has also affected Japan's military presence on the island chain as the nation has to forgo their war efforts in bringing supplies to the islands; their military conquests in Asia and the Pacific Rim have overstretched their resources, and suffer severe reductions in supplies due to frequent American submarine raids on Japanese supply ships. As a result, the Japanese forces on the Sandwich Islands, commanded by Admiral Sanji Iwabuchi and General Tomoyuki Yamashita (the historical leaders of Japanese forces during the Philippines Liberation of 1944-1945), are left without any military support.

In the United States, the Americans have amassed the ships and troops to retake Hawaii, and launch another, but larger, invasion attempt. The Americans quickly gain the upper hand, torpedoing the Japanese carrier Zuikaku from a submarine, and sinking the carriers Akagi and Shōkaku in aerial attacks at the loss of only one escort carrier. The Americans, greatly aided by their new F6F Hellcat fighter, quickly gain control of the air, and gradually defeat the Japanese on Oahu. Most important, Japanese officials and their Hawaiian collaborators escape on a submarine as Honolulu falls, but Minoru Genda and the King and Queen of Hawaii choose to commit suicide. Following the American victory, Hawaii became the staging point for the American war effort in the Pacific Theater, as it was in the actual war, albeit longer.

What happens outside Hawaii is sparsely referred to in the two novels of the series. The projected invasion of Port Moresby succeeded, so New Guinea was entirely under Japanese control from mid-1942 onward. The Battle of Stalingrad took place and was a Soviet victory, but there were no landings in French North Africa. Instead, the US shipped a massive army around Africa, possibly larger than the British and Commonwealth forces present for the historical Battle of El Alamein. The buildup of American naval forces for the second attempt to take Hawaii would need a faster buildup of ships than is historical, implying that much more industrial effort was put into this buildup, leaving less for Europe. The implication is that the Allies would not prevail in Europe, with no Sicilian or Italian campaign in 1943, and no Normandy landings in 1944. By the end of the novel, it appears that there will be no major Nisei combat forces, and that most ethnic Japanese will be shipped from Hawaii to join those in relocation centers in the United States, a blow to civil rights in postwar America.

== Characters ==
Viewpoint characters are identified with (vp). Historical characters are identified with (h)

Fletcher "Fletch" Armitage (vp) — Army first lieutenant stationed in Hawaii; later, a P.O.W.

Jane Armitage (vp) — Estranged wife of Fletch, third grade teacher, later enslaved as a comfort woman.

Jim Peterson (vp) — Grumman F4F Wildcat pilot flying off the USS Enterprise who is shot down on the first day of the war. With no plane to fly, he joins the US Army as a private and fights as an infantryman until the surrender.

Joe Crosetti (vp) — Son of a San Francisco fisherman who enlists after Pearl Harbor and eventually flies a Grumman F6F Hellcat fighter.

Orson Sharp — A Mormon from Salt Lake City who becomes Joe Crosetti's friend in flight training and goes on to serve with him in the same fighter squadron.

Lester Dillon (vp) — Crusty Marine Platoon Sergeant, in the Corps since 1918. Dillon is familiar with the islands from his peacetime service, so he provides not only a view of the fighting when the US retakes Oahu but insights into the prewar period.

Isoroku Yamamoto (h) — Notorious in the U.S. for planning the Pearl Harbor attack, Yamamoto was killed in April 1943 in real history.

Tomoyuki Yamashita (h)—In real history, Yamashita led the brilliant campaign that drove Britain from Malaya, and captured Singapore in less than three months against forces that outnumbered his own by more than two to one. In the series, he leads the troops that invade Oahu and stays in the Islands after the conquest.

Minoru Genda (vp,h)— Main planner of the Pearl Harbor attack. Both Yamamoto and Genda wanted to invade Hawaii, but in actual history were not able to persuade the Japanese Army to allocate troops.

Stanley Owana Laanui — The puppet "King of Hawaii" the Japanese set up during their occupation.

Cynthia Laanui — King Stanley's red-headed queen, and eventually Minoru Genda's lover.

Jiro Takahashi (vp) — Born in Japan and still a Japanese citizen (it was impossible for Japanese-born aliens to become US citizens in this era), Jiro has in fact lived in Hawaii most of his life, and owns his own fishing boat, the sampan Oshima Maru, named after the county in Japan where he was born. His sons Kenzo (Ken) and Hitoshi (Hank) do not share in his unshakeable Japanese patriotism.

Kenzo Takahashi (vp) — Born in Hawaii and, thus, a U.S. citizen, Ken sees Japan as enemy nation, especially after his mother is killed by a Japanese air raid on Honolulu.

Elsie Sundberg — Ken's haole girlfriend.

Oscar van der Kirk (vp) — An early convert to surfing culture who never went home after a Hawaiian vacation. He gets to invent sailboarding in order to catch more fish as food becomes hard to get in Hawaii, especially for non-Japanese civilians.

Charlie Kaapu — Oscar's best bud and fellow surfer. After getting caught sleeping with the mistress of a Japanese Officer, Charlie gets to join Jim Peterson and other POWs being worked to death digging a tunnel.

Susie Higgins — Oscar's latest girl, another divorcee from the mainland, caught by the invasion.

== See also ==
- 1942 (novel)
- Pacific War series
