= The Excalibur Alternative =

2002 novel by David Weber

- Author: David Weber
- Language: English
- Genre: Science fiction
- Publisher: Baen Books
- Publication date: 2002
- Publication place: United States
- Media type: Print (Hardback & Paperback)
- ISBN: 0-671-31860-8
- OCLC: 47930663
- Dewey Decimal: 813/.54 21
- LC Class: PS3573.E217 E93 2002

The Excalibur Alternative is a science fiction novel by American writer David Weber, published by Baen Books in 2002. It is one of several novels based on the premise of David Drake's 1986 novel Ranks of Bronze. This novel is based on the short story "Sir George and the Dragon", which appeared in the 2001 anthology Foreign Legions.

== Plot summary ==
The story begins when a 14th-century English army is abducted by aliens of the Galactic Federation to serve as mercenaries on planets where only low-tech weaponry is legal. The aliens are bound by a Galactic Federation law that states that advanced weapons can not be used on primitive worlds. Another Guild had previously abducted a legion from the Roman Empire and used it to obtain victory in many confrontations and thereby increase its commercial empire. Other aliens were inspired to try the same tactics and came to Earth to find their own army to fight for them. As the plot progresses, the English army continues to fight for the aliens, until the Baron in charge of the English is approached by a dragon-like alien under the heel of the Guild Aliens. The dragon-like creature tells the Baron the story of the Federation.

The Galactic Federation was originally started over one hundred fifty thousand years ago by 3 races, with membership of the council requiring development of a form of faster-than-light (FTL) drive. Over the course of their long history, the Federation strayed from its values. It now has 22 races on the council (of which only 1 is an original founder) and when it discovers new races it invades them so it can freeze their technological development and force them to become a protectorate.

The dragon-like creature is from one of these worlds, saying that the Federation came during his world's nuclear age. The creature says that all the other races are different than humanity because of the rate at which it develops. This is shown when the Guild Alien makes a comment about how humanity would have developed gunpowder in 1000 years from the time he took the English from the 14th century, instead of the 200 years it actually took. The dragon-creature and the Baron eventually succeed in a mutiny and take over the ship, but they decide that they can not go back to Earth because the Federation would find them too fast.

The story then moves forward to the 22nd century, on Earth, now under the single Solar government, where humanity has become capable of building vast ships in space and has developed an FTL drive. However, the Federation considers their fast development a threat to its stability and has dispatched a fleet to wipe humanity from the universe.

As the massive Federation battleships are about to destroy the comparably tiny human ships, larger spaceships appear and destroy the Federation ships easily. The rescuers of Earth are the Avalon Empire, the civilization founded by the English who have grown in numbers and, using the technology found on the captured Guild ship, have advanced far beyond the Federation. For centuries, they have prepared and lay in hiding so could return at the moment of Earth's greatest need (similar to the sword Excalibur in the legend of King Arthur, which gives rise to the title of the book).

The English reveal themselves to Earth and offer an alliance to take on the Federation, but the fight will be far from easy. The Federation has over fifteen hundred worlds, with an average population of 11 billion on each world, while humanity only has the Avalon empire, who has grown to live across 20 some worlds, and Earth. But, with the technical superiority of the Avalon empire and a carefully planned series of rebellions on "protected" worlds in the Federation, humanity at least stands a chance.

== Literary significance and reception ==
Publishers Weekly praised Weber's "apt characterization" and knowledge of medieval weaponry and tactics, but found the emphasis on action meant that subplots were neglected.

The book was reviewed for the Polish fanzine Esensja by Beatrycze Nowicka.

The premise of The Excalibur Alternative bears marked similarity to Poul Anderson's popular 1960 novel The High Crusade.

== Allusions to actual history, geography and current science ==
David Weber says, "I'd say that I come from a historian's perspective on all of the science fiction that I write." However, he admits that he "cheated" while writing The Excalibur Alternative when it came time to write actual historical fiction:

I started out before the Battle of Crécy and the Battle of Agincourt, but then I took them out of that matrix. And so I took an historical entity in the form of the English troops and threw it into a science fiction environment. By the time I brought them back to Earth, Earth had been developing long enough the Earth was a science-fiction environment, as well. So it's not like 1633 or 1632 would have been.
