= Rally Cry (novel) =

1990 novel by William R. Forstchen

- First edition cover
- Author: William Forstchen
- Language: English
- Series: The Lost Regiment
- Genre: Science fiction
- Publisher: Penguin Books
- Publication date: 1990
- Publication place: United States
- Media type: Print (Paperback, audio-CD)
- Pages: 416 (first edition, paperback)
- ISBN: 0-451-45007-8 (first edition, paperback)
- OCLC: 21654499
- Followed by: Union Forever

Rally Cry is a science fiction novel by American writer William Forstchen, first published in 1990. It is the first book in Forstchen's Lost Regiment series. Its plot follows the Union Army's 35th Maine Volunteer Infantry and 44th New York Light Artillery as they board a transport ship, the Ogunquit, in City Point, Virginia, on January 2, 1865. Their mission is to take place in the amphibious assault of Fort Fisher, the Confederate fort defending Wilmington, North Carolina.

Caught in a strong storm soon after entering the Atlantic Ocean, they are fighting for their lives 400 miles (640 km) southwest of Bermuda (in or near the Bermuda Triangle) when a blinding light appears, swells, and envelops the ship while rendering the men aboard unconscious. They awake to find themselves transported to a different world. They quickly find friends and enemies in this new world where past civilizations from Earth were transported including feudal Russians, ancient Romans and Carthaginians, Zulus and others.

The planet has many animals, some megafauna of the Earth’s Ice Age and others from totally alien worlds. In addition—as the soldiers of the 35th Maine rapidly discover—humans are not the dominant form of life on this planet, which is called Valennia. Rather, humans are the enemies and sometime cattle of nine-foot-tall alien nomads. Valennia, additionally, is smaller than the Earth. There are fewer and smaller freshwater oceans, gravity is lighter, and most of the land masses are contiguous.

Rally Cry is divided into two parts. The first describes the 35th Maine's initial voyage and passage into Valennia via a "tunnel of light". In the second half, Keane and his men prepare for the coming of the Tugars, the northernmost group of Horde aliens.

== Plot summary ==
=== Revolution ===
The 35th Maine sets up a camp inside the land of Rus, outside a boyar's city, Suzdal. They are thrown into an intricate network of political feuds where the boyar, Ivor, struggles against the church for power. Both sides wish to exploit Keane and his men. The men of the 35th befriend peasants and the ideas of liberty, democracy, and freedom spread. Most of the 35th are ardent supporters of Lincoln and many abolitionists among them wish to change the order of the feudal society.

The men learn of the human-eating enemies called Tugars, seeing them depicted in a church. Keane allows for a vote to either stay and fight with Rus or to leave and try and mass strength elsewhere while avoiding the horde. The church's prelate, Rasnar, convinces Ivor to attack Keane and steal the guns on the night of the vote. The peasants revolt and are led particularly by one man, Kalencka (Kal), who befriends the Maine men and becomes an interpreter for Ivor. On the night Ivor masses his armies to crush Keane, Kal starts the rebellion. As the peasants are crushed, Keane calls off the vote instead letting the men place their votes by choosing whether or not to march to the aid of the peasants. Keane manages to come to the aid of peasants in time, and shortly after Rasnar and Ivor kill each other. The peasants are now free, but trouble looms.

=== Tugar race ===
The Tugars are a horde of alien humanoids that devour humans as "cattle", circling the world and devouring one-fifth of the people in each city-state roughly every 20 years. However the men of the 35th have a substantial advantage over the beings of this world in that they have guns.

The Tugars are biologically very similar to humans, and can contract some of the same diseases. They evolved on another world and resemble humans due to convergent evolution. They spread from world to world by "tunnels of light", which are wormholes their ancestors built. They are proportioned like humans, but are eight- to ten-feet (2.4–3.0m) tall. Their bodies and almost noseless faces are covered with short hair and they have large canine teeth. Though their faces are somewhat apelike and in other ways resemble the wolfman, their bodies are Herculean in build and of handsome appearance. They ride horses of very large breed due to their stature. Tugar society is ruled by males with their females taking no significant social, political, or military role, quite unlike human nomads. They are very good mounted archers, shooting four-foot-long (1.2m) arrows. It is revealed that the Tugars are a fallen race that once had a great interstellar civilization. The Tugars no longer understand how their ancestors invented the "tunnels of light", of which Earth seems to have several that operate sporadically. One Tugar in the series jokes to a human that he will show him the location of one, "for a price." There are other hordes of the same aliens, called the Merki and Bantag. Many humans just call all the aliens "Tugars" by definition.

They received their horses and perhaps some of their nomad culture from the Earth. The Tugars say that in the past they have visited the Earth, and they vaguely resemble the Bigfoot. The Tugars do not understand why Colonel Keane wants to fight them; in a conference the Tugar ruler told Keane that they protected the "cattle" when they first were settled on Valennia, and in any event the Tugars eat only 20% of the humans before they move on. The Tugars rely on humans for all the food and manufactured goods to maintain their nomadic way of life. Human "pets" follow the Tugar hordes, and are expected to eat what their masters do, and fight alongside their masters while seeing men, women, and children butchered and devoured as a routine matter. Most Tugars think that humans are simply inferior and have no souls, and cannot imagine that they would revolt rather than accept the status quo.

The Tugars are very conservative. They know they rely on the human "cattle" for all their needs, make nothing by themselves and are far outnumbered by humans. Some think their dependence on the human "cattle" threatens them with eventual extinction, but the rank-and-file Tugar would rather keep matters exactly as they are. The Tugars have encountered at least two other alien races on Valennia, brought there via the tunnels of light. One was a human-sized, Tugar-like hairy humanoid, and became "cattle" like humans; the other was non-humanoid with very advanced weapons. Once the Tugars destroyed the advanced aliens by force of numbers they refused to copy their weapons and threw them into the sea. The Tugars also encountered two human pirate ships brought through the tunnel of light. They captured one and said "they killed many Tugars before we feasted on them" but likewise refused to copy the pirate's guns.

=== War for Freedom ===
In the second half of the book, Keane and his men prepare for the coming of the Tugars. Kal estimates that there are hundreds of thousands compared to only one regiment of the 35th. They estimate years before the Tugars arrive, but unknown to them, the Tugars are force-marching across the northern lands because a smallpox epidemic is killing off their "cattle". The Maine men, being of many skills and crafts, set about trying to create a modern industry in only a year or so. They work to train and arm Rus soldiers and militia. Factories are created and a railroad is built. They fortify the city, but soon the Tugars come.

A Tugar agent, called the "Namer of Time" is the first alien leader to show up, with his escort and some Rus "pets" who have not seen their homes for twenty years. He knows about the Yankees and demands they disarm and provide 20% of their men as food. He tells them that other humans in the past have revolted, only to be totally exterminated. A confrontation ensues in which a Union soldier and Tugar warrior are killed. Keane tells the Namer of Time that the only tribute he will pay will be in lead.

They defeat an advance force of Tugars by setting up an ambush, but the bulk of the army is not far behind. The 35th and their Rus counterparts are battling for their lives. Many men sacrifice themselves, particularly the train conductor, Malady, who blows himself up taking hundreds of Tugars with him. The Tugar losses are staggering but they begin to overwhelm the city. The Qar Qarth of the Tugars, Muzta, faces opposition within his horde so he does not listen to the advice of his advisor Qubata to draw out the attack and starve the Yankees into submission. They make a suicidal charge, which begins to work as they break into the city. With little hope left, some of the men abandon the rest on the Ogunquit and sail away.

By now Keane finds that the Tugars have become a little less conservative and are forcing their human pets and slaves to make guns for them. However, the Tugars themselves still will do no labor of any kind and remain warriors.

The remaining men of the 35th Maine form near the center of the city. Keane prepares his men for the onslaught as they had at Gettysburg. They fix bayonets and prepare to charge. At the last minute, Keane's protegee, Vincent Hawthorne, commandeers their scouting balloon and daringly flies it to the dam the men constructed. Hawthorne sets the dam to blow and Qubata sees Hawthorne's intent and tries to stop him. Qubata is blown away in the explosion trying to save the horde, but it is futile. A torrent of water envelopes the city and drowns the horde. The remaining Tugars are captured or retreat. What is left of Suzdal is saved and the Tugar horde is decimated, a skeleton of its former self. The Tugar horde makes peace with the Union soldiers and rides away.

== Characters ==
Andrew Lawrence Keane
A Colonel in the Union Army. He leads the 35th Maine volunteer regiment. Keane was a college history professor before volunteering. Keane's first command was at Antietam. He lost his left arm at Gettysburg.

Hans Schuder
Keane's German mentor. Hans guided Keane at Antietam and let Keane develop from there on. Hans is a hard-ass, though he is very respected among the 35th. He is wise and humble, trying to turn down a commission as General of Suzdal forces that Keane offers.

Pat O'Donald
The commander of the 44th New York, an artillery command. O'Donald and Keane quickly become friends on the Ogunquit, and they develop a mutual respect for each other. O'Donald is hotheaded and quick to anger. His men have a reputation for getting drunk and starting fights.

Tobias Cromwell
The captain of the Ogunquit. He was aboard one of the wooden ships that encounter the CSS Virginia (the Merrimack), and rumored to have abandoned ship before the order was given. Cromwell is constantly at odds with Keane. He is a stanch Democrat where most of the rest of the men are Republicans, and does not object at all to their slavery. Cromwell leads the camp that wishes to escape the Tugars before the Suzdal Revolution, and he flees leaving the men of the 35th to die when the Tugars break into Suzdal.

Vincent Hawthorne
A young Quaker who joins the 35th to end slavery despite that he despises killing. Hawthorne becomes a favorite of Keane, and he quickly rises through the ranks getting a command of his own.

Kalencka
Originally a minstrel for the Boyar Ivor. Kal is very intelligent, but hides it for fear of being persecuted. He becomes an interpreter, and a leader in the revolution of the peasants. He is widely admired and can always rally the common people behind him. He is also referred to as "The Mouse" and uses it as a rally cry for the peasants to join him.

Muzta
Qar Qarth of the Tugar horde. He is a rational though distressed leader. Factions within the Tugar horde are just short of challenging his claim as leader. Many of his decisions are made with that taken into account, even if they may not be the wisest. His mentor is the old warrior that fought with his father, Qubata. Muzta cares for his people, though usually takes the quick temporary fix rather than taking long term consequences into account.

Qubata
The leader of the Tugar armies. He is also one of the oldest warriors, and one of the few who treats Keane like a real adversary rather than just "cattle." He is often shunned because the Tugar thought that cattle are not equal to Tugars. Qubata led the horde to victory at the famous battle of Orki defeating their rival horde the Merki in an epic battle. He guides and advises Muzta as a friend and mentor, though Muzta does not always listen.

Ivor
The boyar of Suzdal. He wishes to unite the lands of Rus under his rule. He is constantly at odds with the church prelate, Rasnar, who wishes to take his power away. Ivor also has to compete with his bastard half-brother Mikhail, who is a puppet of Rasnar.

Rasnar
The corrupt prelate of the church. His power was taken away by Ivor's father and he hopes to get it back. The ruling system was set up by the Tugars placing the church and the boyars at odds, and Rasnar hopes to use the Tugars to help him. Rasnar is corrupt and only thinks about furthering his own goals.

Casmar
The leader of the church after Rasnar. Casmar furthers the revolution in Suzdal by tricking the nobleman against each other. After Rasnar's death, Casmar leads the church and tries to mend the damage Rasnar gave it.

== See also ==
- William R. Forstchen
