= Gettysburg: A Novel of the Civil War =

Alternate history novel

Gettysburg
- First edition
- Author: Newt Gingrich; William R. Forstchen
- Language: English
- Genre: Alternate history novel
- Publisher: Thomas Dunne Books
- Publication date: June 12, 2003
- Publication place: United States
- Media type: Print (Hardback & Paperback)
- Pages: 384 (1st edition)
- ISBN: 978-0-312-30935-0 (1st edition)
- OCLC: 51559226
- Dewey Decimal: 813/.6 21
- LC Class: PS3557.I4945 G48 2003
- Followed by: Grant Comes East

Gettysburg: A Novel of the Civil War is an alternate history novel written by Newt Gingrich and William R. Forstchen. It was published in 2003. It is the first part in a trilogy in which the next books are respectively Grant Comes East and Never Call Retreat.

== Plot summary ==
In 1863, Robert E. Lee and the Army of Northern Virginia are victorious at the Battle of Gettysburg (not the United States' Union Army, which won in reality). Instead of attacking the Union line on July 2, 1863, Lee conducts a broad turning movement and forces the Army of the Potomac to attack him in a favorable position. Gettysburg becomes something of a footnote in the main battle, which takes place at Union Mills in Maryland. The defeat at Union Mills is a grave setback to the Union Army, but it alone does not end the war or determine its outcome.

The book brings an opposing view to Bring the Jubilee, published fifty years earlier in 1953, which assumes that a Union defeat in Gettysburg would have led to a complete defeat and catastrophic collapse of the North.

== Historical figures ==
=== Union ===
- President Abraham Lincoln
- Secretary of War Edwin Stanton
- General-in-Chief Henry Halleck
- Commanding General George Meade
- General Winfield Scott Hancock
- General John Buford †
- General William Gamble (POW)
- General Herman Haupt
- General Henry Jackson Hunt
- General Daniel Butterfield
- General Daniel Sickles
- General John Reynolds †
- General Adelbert Ames †
- General Oliver O. Howard
- General Gouverneur K. Warren
- General Strong Vincent †
- General Carl Schurz
- General Abner Doubleday (POW)
- Colonel Hiram Berdan
- Colonel Joshua Chamberlain (POW)
- Captain Hubert Dilger

=== Confederacy ===
- Commanding General Robert E. Lee
- General James Longstreet
- General Richard S. Ewell
- General Jubal Early
- General Bradley Johnson
- General A. P. Hill
- General John Bell Hood
- General J. E. B. Stuart
- General Henry Heth
- General Jerome B. Robertson
- General George Pickett
- General Lewis Armistead
- General George T. Anderson
- General Evander M. Law
- General Isaac R. Trimble †
- General Robert E. Rodes †
- Colonel Edward Porter Alexander
- Major Walter H. Taylor
- Major Jedediah Hotchkiss
- Major John Williamson

== See also ==
- American Civil War alternate histories
