= Ranks of Bronze =

1986 science fiction novel by David Drake

- First edition
- Author: David Drake
- Cover artist: Alan Gutierrez
- Language: English
- Genre: Science fiction
- Publisher: Baen Books
- Publication date: May 1986
- Publication place: United States
- Media type: Print (paperback)
- Pages: 314
- ISBN: 0-671-65568-X (Paperback edition 1986) ISBN 0-671-31833-0 (Paperback edition 2001)
- OCLC: 13785437

Ranks of Bronze is a science fiction novel by American writer David Drake.

== Plot summary ==
A defeated Roman legion is sold into slavery to alien traders seeking low tech soldiers to be used in conflicts to secure trading rights on alien planets. Their new masters soon learn that the Romans are the best low tech fighters that can be found. Given their worth as soldiers and success on the battlefield, the Romans' alien masters provide them with everything, including near immortality. However, the Romans want only one thing, and that is to go home.

== Sequels ==
- Foreign Legions (2002) short stories edited by Drake
- The Excalibur Alternative (2002), David Weber

== Release details ==
- Paperback edition 1986 ISBN 0-671-65568-X
- Paperback edition 2001 ISBN 0-671-31833-0
