= Grant Comes East =

2004 novel by William R. Forstchen

- First edition
- Author: Newt Gingrich; William R. Forstchen; Albert S. Hanser
- Translator: German
- Cover artist: Don Troiani
- Language: English
- Genre: Alternate history novel
- Publisher: Thomas Dunne Books
- Publication date: June 1, 2004
- Publication place: United States
- Media type: Print (Hardback & Paperback)
- Pages: 404 pp (1st edition)
- ISBN: 0-312-30937-6 (1st edition)
- OCLC: 54426344
- Dewey Decimal: 813/.54 22
- LC Class: PS3557.I4945 G73 2004
- Preceded by: Gettysburg
- Followed by: Never Call Retreat

Grant Comes East: A Novel of the Civil War (2004) is an alternate history novel written by Newt Gingrich, William R. Forstchen, and Albert S. Hanser. It is the second of a trilogy, following Gettysburg: A Novel of the Civil War and preceding Never Call Retreat: Lee and Grant: The Final Victory. Published in 2005, the novel includes illustrations and historic photographs of the Civil War. It was featured on The New York Times bestseller list.

== Plot summary ==
Subsequent to the battle that began at Gettysburg ended on July 4, 1863 (at the same time as the fall of Vicksburg) with a decisive but costly Confederate victory, General Robert E. Lee and his troops march on Washington, D.C. They launch an assault, hoping that if they can take the capital, they can win the war.

Meanwhile, President Abraham Lincoln has appointed Major General Ulysses S. Grant, the victor of Vicksburg, as commander of all Union forces and ordered him to attack Lee. Grant masses his forces (the newly minted Army of the Susquehanna) at Harrisburg, Pennsylvania, while Maj. Gen. Daniel E. Sickles gains control (through his violent pacification of the New York Draft Riots) of the Army of the Potomac.

Sickles has his eye on the White House, but he needs to defeat Lee in order to win the Civil War for the War Democrats. Violating orders from Grant, Sickles mobilizes his troops to meet Lee's army alone. A sidebar shows Napoleon III planning to have France invade the United States through its client state, the Second Mexican Empire.

Repulsed at Fort Stevens outside Washington (where the black troops of the 54th Massachusetts Infantry regiment played a decisive role), Lee turns on Baltimore. Abandoned by the Union, Baltimore descends into chaos; Lee, sickened by the violence, orders the provost guard in force to end it. Using Baltimore to threaten Washington, D.C., Lee turns his entire army upon the advancing Sickles, facing off at the former site of Joppa along the Gunpowder River northeast of Baltimore.

Lee destroys the Army of the Potomac in a rout, with Sickles losing a leg in the process (as he did historically in the Battle of Gettysburg). The battle pens Lee up in Maryland, however. Generals Grant and William T. Sherman converge on Virginia via Pennsylvania and Georgia. Lee scrambles to meet Grant's threat.

== Historical figures ==
- Judah Benjamin, Confederate secretary of state
- Jefferson Davis, Confederate president
- Ulysses S. Grant, US general
- Herman Haupt, US general
- Robert E. Lee, Confederate general
- Abraham Lincoln, US President
- James Longstreet, Confederate general
- Daniel Sickles, US general (WIA)
- Elihu B. Washburne, US congressman
- Ely S. Parker, Grant's secretary
- John B. Hood, Confederate general
- Wade Hampton III, Confederate general †
- David B. Birney, Union general
- Lewis Armistead, Confederate general
- P.G.T. Beauregard, Confederate general
- George Pickett, Confederate general
- Lafayette McLaws, Confederate general (WIA)
- William T. Sherman, Union general
- J.E.B. Stuart, Confederate general
- Robert Gould Shaw, Union colonel
- Walt Whitman, Union nurse
- James B. McPherson, Union general
- Edward O. C. Ord, Union general
- Ambrose Burnside, Union general
- Horatio Seymour, Democratic New York governor
- William "Boss" Tweed, New York political boss
- George Sykes, Union general
- Gouverneur K. Warren, Union general
- Edwin Stanton, Union Secretary of War
- Gideon Welles, Union Secretary of the Navy
