= William R. Forstchen =

American historian and author (born 1950)

- Born: October 11, 1950 (age 75); Millburn, New Jersey, U.S.
- Education: Hightstown High School; Purdue University
- Occupations: Historian, novelist
- Title: Professor

William R. Forstchen (born October 11, 1950) is an American historian and author. A professor of History and Faculty Fellow at Montreat College, in Montreat, North Carolina, he received his doctorate from Purdue University.

He has published numerous popular novels and works about military and alternative history, thrillers, and speculative events. His three alternate novels of the Civil War were co-written with politician Newt Gingrich; two also had the participation of writer Albert S. Hanser. He and the other two men have also written three novels about General George Washington during the American Revolutionary War.

== Early life and education ==
Forstchen was born and grew up in Millburn, New Jersey. He attended Hightstown High School. He completed his doctorate at Purdue University, studying under the historian Gunther E. Rothenberg. He specialized in Military History, the American Civil War, and the History of Technology. His doctoral dissertation was The 28th USCTs: Indiana's African-Americans Go to War, 1863–1865.

Fortschen has been a resident of Hightstown, New Jersey.

== Writing ==
In addition to academic writing, Forstchen has written articles, published in such venues as Boys' Life, and novels for both adults and young adults. He has published nearly fifty books. His young adult novel, We Look Like Men of War, is about an African-American regiment that fought in the Civil War at the Battle of the Crater. It is based on material he originally developed for his dissertation.

Since the late 20th century, Forstchen has shifted toward writing historical fiction and alternate history. In non-fiction he has concentrated on history and technological issues.

=== John Matherson series ===
Dr. Forstchen's novel, One Second After (2009, Tor/Forge/St. Martin's books) reached the New York Times best seller list; it was on the list for twelve weeks. The sequel, One Year After, was released in 2015. The next work of the series, The Final Day, was released on January 4, 2017. The first three of the books in what is now called The John Matherson Series achieved NYT best seller status.

Forstchen based his research for One Second After on the 2004 bipartisan Congressional study of the potential threat to the continental United States from an EMP attack: Report of the Commission to Assess the Threat to the United States from Electromagnetic Pulse (EMP) Attack. Drawing on this and other government and private studies, Forstchen explores in his novel what might happen in a "typical" American town in the wake of an attack with electro-magnetic pulse (EMP) weapons. Forstchen has been invited to make presentations regarding the threat of EMP before members of Congress, and at STRATCOM, Sandia Labs, and NASA.

=== Other works ===
Forstchen's novel Pillar to the Sky (2014) explores the concept of a Space Elevator. The tower would rise from the equator to geostationary orbit and beyond in order to revolutionize space transportation in the 21st century. Forstchen's thesis is that the building of such a permanent transportation system to high Earth orbit would reignite America's economic and technological prominence in the 21st century. He promoted the idea that such a tower could be used to "hot wire” limitless non-polluting energy from solar panels deployed in space and free peoples on Earth from dependence on greenhouse gas-emitting energy production.

Forstchen has self-published two novellas. Day of Wrath (2014) is about an ISIS-inspired attack on United States public schools. Twin Flame (2017), co-authored with author Nora D'Ecclesis, is a "biographical novella". He explores the history of his relationship with his former wife Robin.

== Bibliography ==
=== Magic: The Gathering ===
1. Arena (1994)

=== The Lost Regiment Series ===
1. Rally Cry (1990)
2. Union Forever (1991)
3. Terrible Swift Sword (1992)
4. Fateful Lightning (1992)
5. Battle Hymn (1997)
6. Never Sound Retreat (1998)
7. A Band of Brothers (1999)
8. Men of War (1999)
9. Down to the Sea (2000)

=== Ice Prophet series ===
1. Ice Prophet (1983)
2. The Flame Upon the Ice (1984)
3. A Darkness upon the Ice (1985)

=== Wing Commander series ===
- Wing Commander: End Run (1993)
- Wing Commander: Fleet Action (1994)
- Wing Commander: Heart of the Tiger (1995) (along with Andrew Keith)
- Action Stations (1998)

=== Star Voyager Academy series ===
- Star Voyager Academy (1994)
- Article 23 (1998)
- Prometheus (1999)

=== Civil War alternate history trilogy ===
With Newt Gingrich and Albert S. Hanser.

1. Gettysburg: A Novel of the Civil War (2003)
2. Grant Comes East (2004)
3. Never Call Retreat: Lee and Grant: The Final Victory (2005)

=== Pacific War series ===
Along with Newt Gingrich.

1. Pearl Harbor (2007)
2. Days of Infamy (2008)

=== Legends of the Riftwar ===
With Raymond E. Feist.

1. Honoured Enemy (2001)

=== Historical fiction ===
- We Look Like Men of War (2003)
- The Battle of the Crater: A Novel (2011) (with Newt Gingrich and Albert S. Hanser)

=== George Washington series ===
With Newt Gingrich and Albert S. Hanser.

- To Try Men's Souls: A Novel of George Washington and the Fight for American Freedom (2009)
- Valley Forge: George Washington and the Crucible of Victory (2010)
- Victory at Yorktown (2012)

=== Star Trek: The Next Generation ===
- The Forgotten War (1999)

=== Shattered Light series ===
- Catseye (1999) (along with Jaki Demarest)

=== Gamester Wars trilogy ===
- The Alexandrian Ring (1987)
- The Assassin Gambit (1988)
- The Napoleon Wager (1993)

=== Non-fiction ===
- Hot Shots: An Oral History of the Air Force Combat Pilots of the Korean War (2000) (with Jennie E. Chancey)
- Hot Shots: America's First Jet Aces (2002) ( with Jennie E. Chancey)
- Honor Untarnished: A West Point Graduate's Memoir of World War II (2003) (wrote introduction)
- It Seemed Like a Good Idea...: A Compendium of Great Historical Fiascoes (2009)

=== Crystal series ===
With Greg Morrison.

- The Crystal Warriors (1988)
- The Crystal Sorcerers (1991)

=== John Matherson series ===
- One Second After (2009)
- One Year After (2015)
- The Final Day (2017)
- 5 Years After (August 2023)

=== Stand-alone ===
- Into the Sea of Stars (1986)
- 1945 (1995) (along with Newt Gingrich)
- The Four Magics (1996) (along with Larry Segriff)
- Doctors of the Night (2011)
- Pillar to the Sky (2014)
- Day of Wrath (2014)
- Twin Flame (2017)
- 48 Hours (2019)

=== Short stories and novellas ===
- "A Hard Day for Mother", collected in Harry Turtledove's anthology Alternate Generals (1998)
- "Lee's Victory at Gettysburg... and Then What?", Alternate Gettysburgs (2002)
